= List of Tokyo Metro stations =

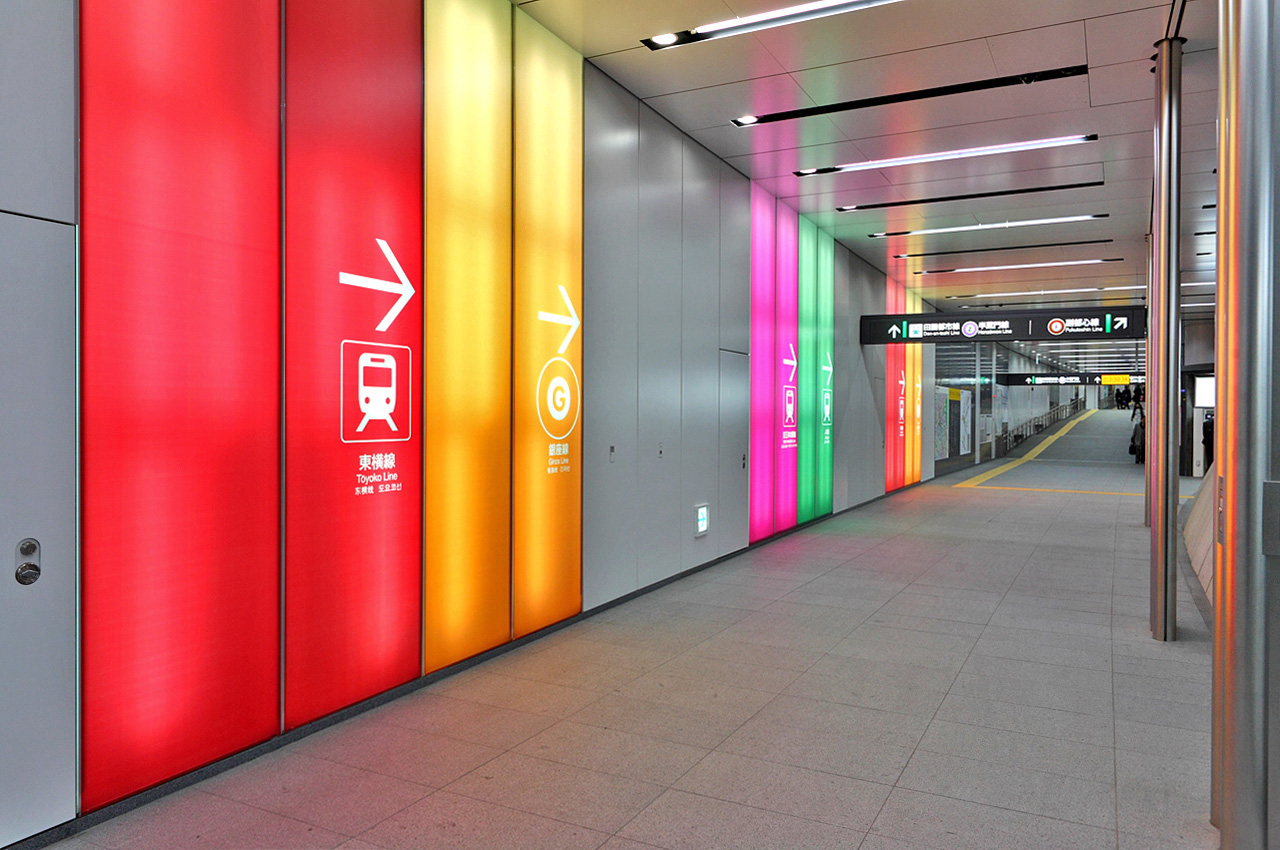
Color-coded wall paneling helps passengers inside the Tokyo Metro Fukutoshin Line's Shibuya Station to navigate passages to connecting rail lines. Shibuya is the fourth busiest station on the Tokyo Metro network and a major interchange with Tōkyū, Keiō, and JR East trains.

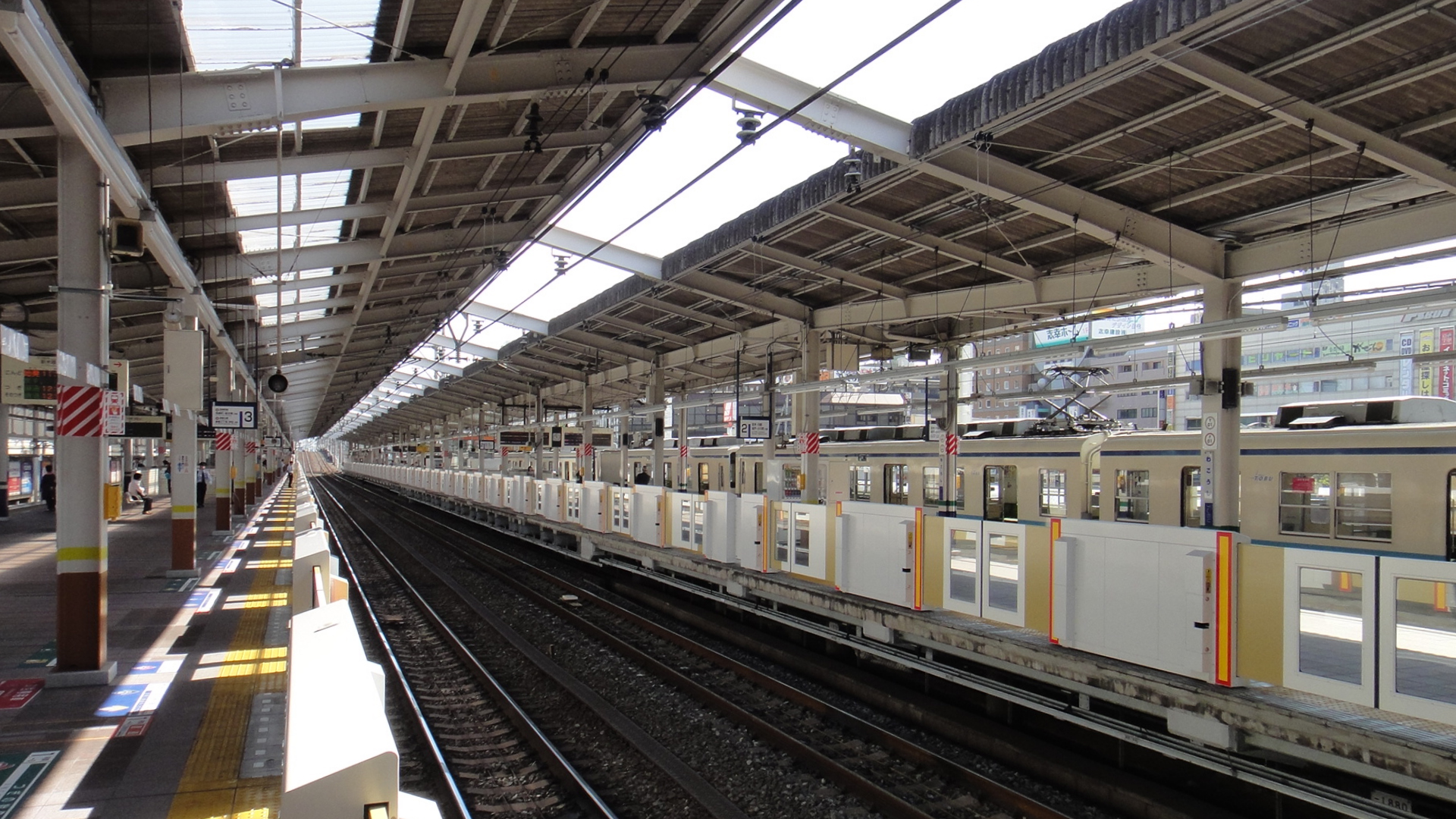
Interface stations like Wakōshi Station are designed to facilitate through-service between Tokyo Metro and other railways, in this case between the Tōbu Tōjō Line and the Tokyo Metro Yūrakuchō and Fukutoshin Lines. In addition to passengers passing through faregates to or from Tokyo Metro trains, ridership reported for these stations also includes passengers entering or exiting the Tokyo Metro system inside through-servicing trains, as well as passengers making cross-platform transfers between Tokyo Metro trains and other railways' trains.

List of Tokyo Metro stations lists stations on the Tokyo Metro, including lines serving the station, station location (ward or city), opening date, design (underground, at-grade, or elevated), and daily ridership.

== Summary ==
There are a total of 142 unique stations (i.e., counting stations served by multiple lines only once) on the Tokyo Metro network, or 179 total stations if each station on each line counts as one station. Tokyo Metro considers Kokkai-gijidō-mae and Tameike-Sannō as a single interchange station, despite the two stations having different names. If these are treated as separate stations, there are a total of 143 unique stations and 180 total stations, respectively. Most stations are located within the 23 special wards and fall inside the Yamanote Line loop—some wards such as Setagaya and Ōta have no stations (or only a limited number of stations), as rail service in these areas has historically been provided by the Toei Subway or any of the various.

In general, the reported daily ridership is the total of faregate entries and exits at each station, and excludes in-system transfers. However, Tokyo Metro reports ridership separately for stations directly shared with other railways—e.g., Shirokanedai and other Namboku Line stations shared with the Toei Mita Line—or "interface" stations that allow for through-servicing and transfers with other railways without exiting the station's paid area—e.g., Ayase on the Chiyoda Line. For stations directly shared with other railways, the daily ridership only considers people using Tokyo Metro trains (or through-servicing trains owned by other railways operating as Tokyo Metro trains). For interface stations, the daily ridership also includes cross-company passengers on through-servicing trains (as part of trackage rights agreements) or transferring from other railways' trains without passing through faregates.

Because of Tokyo Metro's reporting method, stations served by multiple lines that qualify both as shared or interface stations and as "regular" (i.e., not shared and non-interface) stations generally have their ridership separated out by station type. Examples include Shibuya, where ridership for the interconnected Hanzōmon Line and Fukutoshin Line stations (which are interface stations for the Tōkyū Den-en-toshi Line and Tōkyū Tōyoko Line, respectively) is separated out from ridership at the Shibuya terminal station of the Ginza Line, which does not have through-service arrangements with any other railways.

== Stations ==
=== Subway stations ===
Station	Japanese	Photo	Lines	Opening date	Design	Ward or City	Daily ridership (FY2025)
Ikebukuro	池袋		Marunouchi Line Yūrakuchō Line (Tokyo Metro) Fukutoshin Line	Jan 1954; 30 Oct 1974; 7 Dec 1994	Underground	Toshima	529,947
Ōtemachi	大手町		Marunouchi Line Tōzai Line (Tokyo Metro) Chiyoda Line Hanzōmon Line	Jul 1956; 1 Oct 1969; Dec 1969; 26 Jan 1989	Underground	Chiyoda	350,993
Kita-Senju	北千住		Chiyoda Line	Dec 1969	Underground	Adachi	246,410
Ginza	銀座		Ginza Line Marunouchi Line Hibiya Line	3 Mar 1934; Dec 1957; 29 Aug 1964	Underground	Chūō	233,901
Toyosu	豊洲		Yūrakuchō Line (Tokyo Metro)	8 Jun 1988	Underground	Kōtō	215,423
Shimbashi	新橋		Ginza Line	21 Jun 1934	Underground	Minato	209,360
Tōkyō	東京		Marunouchi Line	20 Jul 1956	Underground	Chiyoda	209,216
Shinjuku	新宿		Marunouchi Line	Mar 1959	Underground	Shinjuku	201,609
Shibuya	渋谷		Ginza Line	Dec 1938	Elevated	Shibuya	196,339
Ueno	上野		Ginza Line Hibiya Line	30 Dec 1927; 28 Mar 1961	Underground	Taitō	191,804
Takadanobaba	高田馬場		Tōzai Line (Tokyo Metro)	29 Mar 1969	Underground	Shinjuku	181,109
Nihombashi	日本橋		Ginza Line Tōzai Line (Tokyo Metro)	24 Dec 1932; 14 Sep 1967	Underground	Chūō	181,982
Omotesandō	表参道		Ginza Line Chiyoda Line Hanzōmon Line	18 Nov 1938; 20 Oct 1972; 1 Aug 1978	Underground	Minato	178,572
Iidabashi	飯田橋		Tōzai Line (Tokyo Metro) Yūrakuchō Line (Tokyo Metro) Namboku Line (Tokyo Metro)	23 Dec 1964; 30 Oct 1974; 26 Mar 1996	Underground	Chiyoda; Shinjuku	164,232
Nishi-Nippori	西日暮里		Chiyoda Line	20 Dec 1969	Underground	Arakawa	157,202
Shinjuku Sanchōme	新宿三丁目		Marunouchi Line Fukutoshin Line	15 Mar 1959; 14 Jun 2008	Underground	Shinjuku	159,057
Yūrakuchō	有楽町		Yūrakuchō Line (Tokyo Metro)	30 Oct 1974	Underground	Chiyoda	141,461
Ichigaya	市ヶ谷		Yūrakuchō Line (Tokyo Metro) Namboku Line (Tokyo Metro)	30 Oct 1974; 26 Mar 1996	Underground	Shinjuku	138,047
Kasumigaseki	霞が関		Marunouchi Line Hibiya Line Chiyoda Line	15 Oct 1958; 25 Mar 1964; 20 Mar 1971	Underground	Chiyoda	136,303
Kokkai Gijidō-mae; Tameike-Sannō	国会議事堂前 溜池山王		Marunouchi Line Chiyoda Line Ginza Line Namboku Line (Tokyo Metro)	15 Mar 1959; 20 Oct 1972; 30 Sep 1997; 30 Sep 1997	Underground	Chiyoda	131,557
Yotsuya	四ツ谷		Marunouchi Line Namboku Line (Tokyo Metro)	15 Mar 1959; 26 Mar 1996	Elevated; Underground	Shinjuku	122,461
Mitsukoshimae	三越前		Ginza Line Hanzōmon Line	29 Apr 1932; 26 Jan 1989	Underground	Chūō	121,017
Tōyōchō	東陽町		Tōzai Line (Tokyo Metro)	14 Sep 1967	Underground	Kōtō	116,365
Kayabachō	茅場町		Hibiya Line Tōzai Line (Tokyo Metro)	28 Feb 1963; 14 Sep 1967	Underground	Chūō	115,870
Akihabara	秋葉原		Hibiya Line	31 May 1962	Underground	Chiyoda	114,436
Roppongi	六本木		Hibiya Line	25 Mar 1964	Underground	Minato	111,150
Monzen-Nakachō	門前仲町		Tōzai Line (Tokyo Metro)	14 Sep 1967	Underground	Kōtō	112,155
Asakusa	浅草		Ginza Line	30 Dec 1927	Underground	Taitō	108,997
Kamiyachō	神谷町		Hibiya Line	25 Mar 1964	Underground	Minato	114,275
Meiji-Jingūmae	明治神宮前		Chiyoda Line Fukutoshin Line	20 Oct 1972; 14 Jun 2008	Underground	Shibuya	109,891
Kōrakuen	後楽園		Marunouchi Line Namboku Line (Tokyo Metro)	20 Jan 1954; 26 Mar 1996	Elevated; Underground	Bunkyō	107,604
Ebisu	恵比寿		Hibiya Line	25 Mar 1964	Underground	Shibuya	108,073
Kinshichō	錦糸町		Hanzōmon Line	19 Mar 2003	Underground	Kōtō	108,419
Hatchōbori	八丁堀		Hibiya Line	28 Feb 1963	Underground	Chūō	104,411
Aoyama-Itchōme	青山一丁目		Ginza Line Hanzōmon Line	18 Nov 1938; 1 Aug 1978	Underground	Minato	101,540
Kasai	葛西		Tōzai Line (Tokyo Metro)	29 Mar 1969	Elevated	Edogawa	100,966
Nishi-Kasai	西葛西		Tōzai Line (Tokyo Metro)	1 Oct 1979	Elevated	Edogawa	96,965
Toranomon	虎ノ門		Ginza Line	18 Nov 1938	Underground	Minato	100,524
Shin-Kiba	新木場		Yūrakuchō Line (Tokyo Metro)	8 Jun 1988	Elevated	Kōtō	97,258
Hibiya	日比谷		Hibiya Line Chiyoda Line	29 Aug 1964; 20 Mar 1971	Underground	Chiyoda	97,965
Akasaka Mitsuke	赤坂見附		Ginza Line Marunouchi Line	18 Nov 1938; 15 Mar 1959	Underground	Minato	91,399
Shin-Ochanomizu	新御茶ノ水		Chiyoda Line	20 Dec 1969	Underground	Chiyoda	90,708
Ogikubo	荻窪		Marunouchi Line	23 Jan 1962	Underground	Suginami	88,136
Jimbōchō	神保町		Hanzōmon Line	26 Jan 1989	Underground	Chiyoda	88,450
Nishi-Shinjuku	西新宿		Marunouchi Line	28 May 1996	Underground	Shinjuku	89,464
Higashi-Ginza	東銀座		Hibiya Line	28 Feb 1963	Underground	Chūō	85,379
Waseda	早稲田		Tōzai Line (Tokyo Metro)	23 Dec 1964	Underground	Shinjuku	82,301
Urayasu	浦安		Tōzai Line (Tokyo Metro)	29 Mar 1969	Elevated	Urayasu (Chiba)	79,767
Myōgadani	茗荷谷		Marunouchi Line	20 Jan 1954	Underground (Open-air)	Bunkyō	79,948
Akasaka	赤坂		Chiyoda Line	20 Oct 1972	Underground	Minato	80,453
Nagatachō	永田町		Yūrakuchō Line (Tokyo Metro) Hanzōmon Line Namboku Line (Tokyo Metro)	30 Oct 1974; 21 Sep 1979; 30 Sep 1997	Underground	Chiyoda	78,114
Gaienmae	外苑前		Ginza Line	18 Nov 1938	Underground	Minato	75,483
Suitengūmae	水天宮前		Hanzōmon Line	28 Nov 1990	Underground	Chūō	65,487
Roppongi-Itchōme	六本木一丁目		Namboku Line (Tokyo Metro)	26 Sep 2000	Underground	Minato	79,259
Hanzōmon	半蔵門		Hanzōmon Line	9 Dec 1982	Underground	Chiyoda	76,148
Nakano Sakaue	中野坂上		Marunouchi Line	8 Feb 1961	Underground	Nakano	75,213
Kiba	木場		Tōzai Line (Tokyo Metro)	14 Sep 1967	Underground	Kōtō	74,055
Tsukishima	月島		Yūrakuchō Line (Tokyo Metro)	8 Jun 1988	Underground	Chūō	71,329
Ningyōchō	人形町		Hibiya Line	31 May 1962	Underground	Chūō	80,742
Machiya	町屋		Chiyoda Line	20 Dec 1969	Underground	Arakawa	62,749
Ōji	王子		Namboku Line (Tokyo Metro)	29 Nov 1991	Underground	Kita	62,460
Minami-Sunamachi	南砂町		Tōzai Line (Tokyo Metro)	29 Mar 1969	Underground	Kōtō	59,106
Tsukiji	築地		Hibiya Line	28 Feb 1963	Underground	Chūō	59,809
Kiyosumi-Shirakawa	清澄白河		Hanzōmon Line	19 Mar 2003	Underground	Kōtō	59,952
Hiroo	広尾		Hibiya Line	25 Mar 1964	Underground	Minato	59,210
Awajichō	淡路町		Marunouchi Line	20 Mar 1956	Underground	Chiyoda	60,085
Toranomon Hills	虎ノ門ヒルズ		Hibiya Line	6 Jun 2020	Underground	Minato	64,929
Kanda	神田		Ginza Line	21 Nov 1931	Underground	Chiyoda	56,868
Kōjimachi	麹町		Yūrakuchō Line (Tokyo Metro)	30 Oct 1974	Underground	Chiyoda	58,359
Kyōbashi	京橋		Ginza Line	24 Dec 1932	Underground	Chūō	59,920
Sumiyoshi	住吉		Hanzōmon Line	19 Mar 2003	Underground	Kōtō	55,930
Gyōtoku	行徳		Tōzai Line (Tokyo Metro)	29 Mar 1969	Elevated	Ichikawa (Chiba)	56,188
Ochanomizu	御茶ノ水		Marunouchi Line	20 Jan 1954	Underground	Bunkyō	57,221
Hongō-Sanchōme	本郷三丁目		Marunouchi Line	20 Jan 1954	Underground	Bunkyō	52,058
Minami-Gyōtoku	南行徳		Tōzai Line (Tokyo Metro)	27 Mar 1981	Elevated	Ichikawa (Chiba)	52,692
Chikatetsu Narimasu	地下鉄成増		Yūrakuchō Line (Tokyo Metro) Fukutoshin Line	24 Jun 1983	Underground	Itabashi	52,661
Myōden	妙典		Tōzai Line (Tokyo Metro)	22 Jan 2000	Elevated	Ichikawa (Chiba)	51,919
Edogawabashi	江戸川橋		Yūrakuchō Line (Tokyo Metro)	30 Oct 1974	Underground	Bunkyō	50,264
Shinjuku-gyoemmae	新宿御苑前		Marunouchi Line	15 Mar 1959	Underground	Shinjuku	49,258
Minowa	三ノ輪		Hibiya Line	28 Mar 1961	Underground	Taitō	48,558
Higashi-Ikebukuro	東池袋		Yūrakuchō Line (Tokyo Metro)	30 Oct 1974	Underground	Toshima	46,605
Kita-Ayase	北綾瀬		Chiyoda Line	20 Dec 1979	Elevated	Adachi	46,718
Azabu-Jūban	麻布十番		Namboku Line (Tokyo Metro)	26 Sep 2000	Underground	Minato	43,785
Heiwadai	平和台		Yūrakuchō Line (Tokyo Metro) Fukutoshin Line	24 Jun 1983	Underground	Nerima	43,482
Yotsuya-Sanchōme	四谷三丁目		Marunouchi Line	15 Mar 1959	Underground	Shinjuku	42,902
Takebashi	竹橋		Tōzai Line (Tokyo Metro)	16 Mar 1966	Underground	Chiyoda	43,426
Naka-Okachimachi	仲御徒町		Hibiya Line	28 Mar 1961	Underground	Taitō	43,402
Kanamechō	要町		Yūrakuchō Line (Tokyo Metro) Fukutoshin Line	24 Jun 1983	Underground	Toshima	41,717
Gokokuji	護国寺		Yūrakuchō Line (Tokyo Metro)	30 Oct 1974	Underground	Bunkyō	41,077
Higashi-Shinjuku	東新宿		Fukutoshin Line	14 Jun 2008	Underground	Shinjuku	41,170
Hōnanchō	方南町		Marunouchi Line	23 Mar 1962	Underground	Suginami	42,420
Kagurazaka	神楽坂		Tōzai Line (Tokyo Metro)	23 Dec 1964	Underground	Shinjuku	41,072
Chikatetsu Akatsuka	地下鉄赤塚		Yūrakuchō Line (Tokyo Metro) Fukutoshin Line	24 Jun 1983	Underground	Nerima	41,038
Nogizaka	乃木坂		Chiyoda Line	20 Oct 1972	Underground	Minato	39,057
Senkawa	千川		Yūrakuchō Line (Tokyo Metro) Fukutoshin Line	24 Jun 1983	Underground	Toshima	40,286
Iriya	入谷		Hibiya Line	28 Mar 1961	Underground	Taitō	39,427
Hikawadai	氷川台		Yūrakuchō Line (Tokyo Metro) Fukutoshin Line	24 Jun 1983	Underground	Nerima	38,725
Yushima	湯島		Chiyoda Line	20 Dec 1969	Underground	Bunkyō	39,704
Komagome	駒込		Namboku Line (Tokyo Metro)	29 Nov 1991	Underground	Toshima	38,684
Nishi-Waseda	西早稲田		Fukutoshin Line	14 Jun 2008	Underground	Shinjuku	38,451
Tawaramachi	田原町		Ginza Line	30 Dec 1927	Underground	Taitō	38,874
Shintomichō	新富町		Yūrakuchō Line (Tokyo Metro)	27 Mar 1980	Underground	Chūō	37,006
Ōji-Kamiya	王子神谷		Namboku Line (Tokyo Metro)	29 Nov 1991	Underground	Kita	37,603
Kodenmachō	小伝馬町		Hibiya Line	31 May 1962	Underground	Chūō	36,133
Nijūbashimae	二重橋前		Chiyoda Line	20 Mar 1971	Underground	Chiyoda	38,065
Shin-Kōenji	新高円寺		Marunouchi Line	1 Nov 1961	Underground	Suginami	36,351
Ginza-itchōme	銀座一丁目		Yūrakuchō Line (Tokyo Metro)	30 Oct 1974	Underground	Chūō	34,705
Shin-Nakano	新中野		Marunouchi Line	8 Feb 1961	Underground	Nakano	34,323
Higashi-Kōenji	東高円寺		Marunouchi Line	18 Sep 1964	Underground	Suginami	33,926
Minami-Senju	南千住		Hibiya Line	28 Mar 1961	Elevated	Arakawa	33,585
Yoyogi-Kōen	代々木公園		Chiyoda Line	20 Oct 1972	Underground	Shibuya	29,488
Sendagi	千駄木		Chiyoda Line	20 Dec 1969	Underground	Bunkyō	29,307
Nezu	根津		Chiyoda Line	20 Dec 1969	Underground	Bunkyō	28,781
Suehirochō	末広町		Ginza Line	1 Jan 1930	Underground	Chiyoda	27,833
Tatsumi	辰巳		Yūrakuchō Line (Tokyo Metro)	8 Jun 1988	Underground	Kōtō	28,280
Minami-Asagaya	南阿佐ヶ谷		Marunouchi Line	1 Nov 1961	Underground	Suginami	28,277
Tōdai-mae	東大前		Namboku Line (Tokyo Metro)	26 Mar 1996	Underground	Bunkyō	28,284
Baraki-Nakayama	原木中山		Tōzai Line (Tokyo Metro)	29 Mar 1969	Elevated	Funabashi (Chiba)	28,037
Ochiai	落合		Tōzai Line (Tokyo Metro)	16 Mar 1966	Underground	Shinjuku	27,730
Shin-Ōtsuka	新大塚		Marunouchi Line	20 Jan 1954	Underground	Bunkyō	26,076
Ueno-Hirokōji	上野広小路		Ginza Line	1 Jan 1930	Underground	Taitō	26,319
Kita-Sandō	北参道		Fukutoshin Line	14 Jun 2008	Underground	Shibuya	24,586
Hon-Komagome	本駒込		Namboku Line (Tokyo Metro)	26 Mar 1996	Underground	Bunkyō	21,690
Nakano-Shimbashi	中野新橋		Marunouchi Line	8 Feb 1961	Underground	Nakano	21,004
Zōshigaya	雑司が谷		Fukutoshin Line	14 Jun 2008	Underground	Toshima	19,807
Nakano-Fujimichō	中野富士見町		Marunouchi Line	4 Feb 1961	Underground	Nakano	19,968
Inarichō	稲荷町		Ginza Line	30 Dec 1927	Underground	Taitō	19,729
Shimo	志茂		Namboku Line (Tokyo Metro)	29 Nov 1991	Underground	Kita	16,136
Sakuradamon	桜田門		Yūrakuchō Line (Tokyo Metro)	30 Oct 1974	Underground	Chiyoda	13,160
Nishigahara	西ヶ原		Namboku Line (Tokyo Metro)	29 Nov 1991	Underground	Kita	9,014

=== Stations with Metro and commuter rail connections ===
Station	Japanese	Photo	Lines	Opening date	Design	City	Daily ridership (FY2025)
Shibuya	渋谷		Hanzōmon Line Fukutoshin Line	7 Apr 1977; Jun 2008	Underground	Shibuya	779,659
Ayase	綾瀬		Chiyoda Line	Apr 1971	Elevated	Adachi	392,964
Yoyogi-Uehara	代々木上原		Chiyoda Line	31 Mar 1978	Elevated	Shibuya	292,260
Kita-Senju	北千住		Hibiya Line	31 May 1962	At-grade, elevated	Adachi	283,105
Nishi-Funabashi	西船橋		Tōzai Line (Tokyo Metro)	29 Mar 1969	At-grade	Funabashi (Chiba)	272,840
Naka-Meguro	中目黒		Hibiya Line	22 Jul 1964	Elevated	Meguro	211,234
Oshiage	押上		Hanzōmon Line	Mar 2003	Underground	Sumida	189,638
Kotake-Mukaihara	小竹向原		Yūrakuchō Line (Tokyo Metro) Fukutoshin Line	24 Jul 1983	Underground	Nerima	184,844
Wakōshi	和光市		Yūrakuchō Line (Tokyo Metro) Fukutoshin Line	25 Aug 1987	Elevated	Wakō (Saitama)	182,075
Kudanshita	九段下		Tōzai Line (Tokyo Metro) Hanzōmon Line	23 Dec 1964; 26 Jan 1989	Underground	Chiyoda	170,345
Nakano	中野		Tōzai Line (Tokyo Metro)	Mar 1966	Elevated	Nakano	147,113
Meguro	目黒		Namboku Line (Tokyo Metro)	26 Sep 2000	Underground	Shinagawa	112,491
Akabane Iwabuchi	赤羽岩淵		Namboku Line (Tokyo Metro)	29 Nov 1991	Underground	Kita	99,276
Shirokane-Takanawa	白金高輪		Namboku Line (Tokyo Metro)	26 Sep 2000	Underground	Minato	37,807
Shirokanedai	白金台		Namboku Line (Tokyo Metro)	26 Sep 2000	Underground	Minato	16,970

== Stations under construction ==
Station	Japanese	Lines	Opening date
Sumiyoshi	住吉	(Y)	Mid-2030s (planned)
Sengoku (provisional)	千石	(Y)	Mid-2030s (planned)
Toyocho	東陽町	(Y)	Mid-2030s (planned)
Edagawa (provisional)	枝川	(Y)	Mid-2030s (planned)
Shinagawa	品川	(N)	Mid-2030s (planned)

== Closed stations ==
=== Stations closed to the public ===
Station	Japanese	Line	Opening date	Closing date
Manseibashi	万世橋 (萬世橋)	(G)	January 1, 1930	November 21, 1931

=== Merged stations ===
Station	Japanese	Line	Opening date	Closing date	Note
Jingūmae	神宮前	(G)	November, 1938	1976	Merged with Omote-sando; its platforms now serve as a materials storage area

== Renamed stations ==
Former name		New Name	Line	Renaming date	Opening date
English	Japanese	New Name	Line	Renaming date	Opening date
Aoyama-Yonchome	青山四丁目	Gaiemmae	(G)	September 16, 1939	November 18, 1938
Aoyama-Rokuchome	青山六丁目	Jingumae	(G)	September 16, 1939	November 18, 1938
Nishiginza	西銀座	Ginza	(M)	August 29, 1964	December 15, 1957
Eidan-narimasu	営団成増	Chikatetsu-narimasu	(Y)	April 1, 2004	June 24, 1983
Eidan-akatsuka	営団赤塚	Chikatetsu-akatsuka	(Y)	April 1, 2004	June 24, 1983

== See also ==
- List of Toei Subway stations
