= Hikarigaoka (Nerima Ward) =

Neighborhood in Nerima Ward, Tokyo

Hikarigaoka 光が丘
- Neighborhood (町丁)
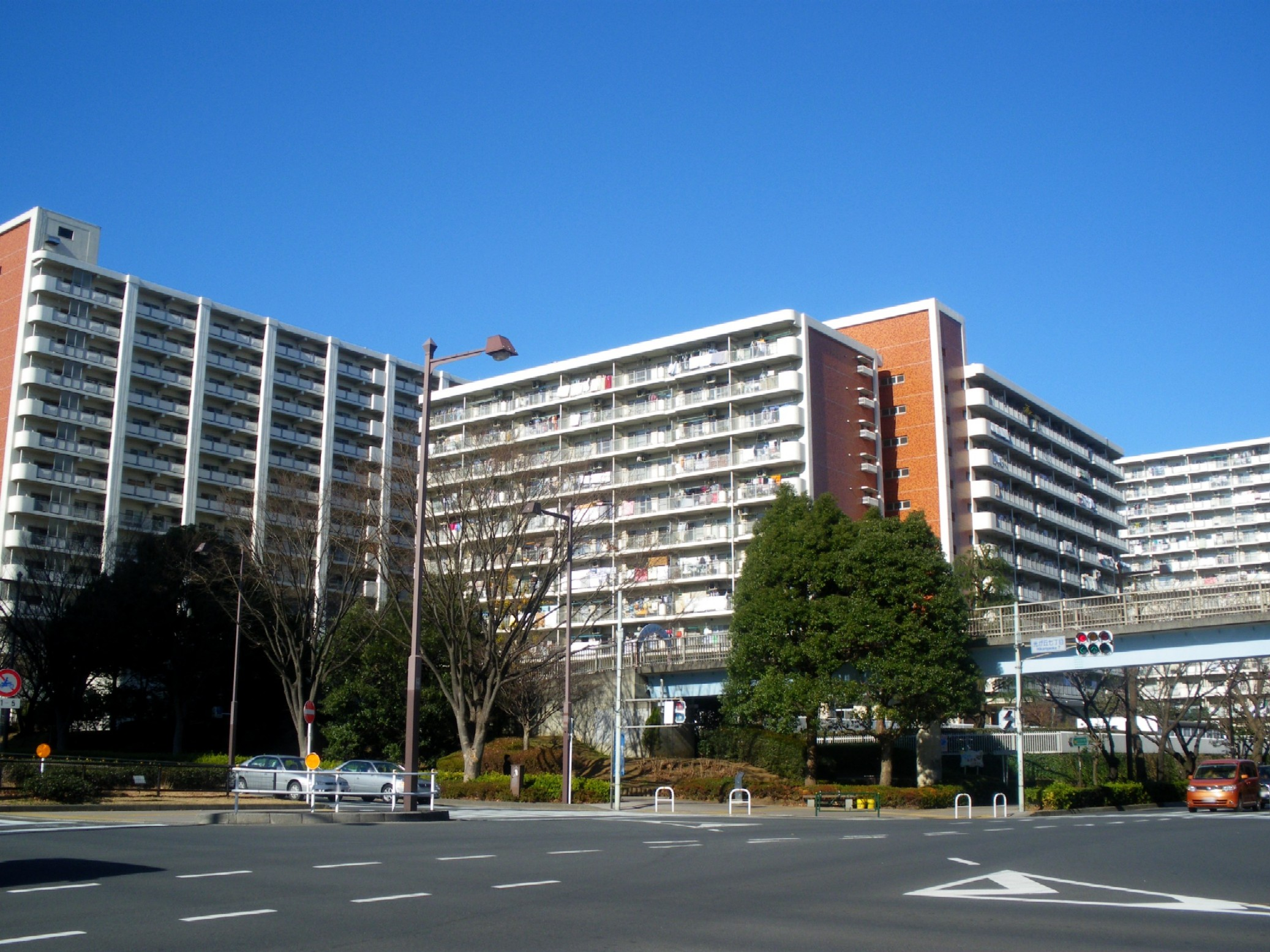
- Hikarigaoka Park Town (Hikarigaoka Danchi) in Hikarigaoka 6th Street.

- Location of Hikarigaoka within the Wards Area of Tokyo
- Coordinates: 35°45′30.79″N 139°37′43.40″E
- Country: Japan
- Region: Kantō
- Metropolis: Tōkyō
- Ward: Nerima

Area
  - Total: 1.671 km^{2} (0.645 sq mi)

Population (April 1, 2025)
  - Total: 26,125
- Time zone: UTC+9 (JST)
- Postal code: 179-0072
- Area code: 03

Hikarigaoka (光が丘) is a neighborhood of Nerima Ward in Tokyo, Japan. The residential address system has been implemented since 1983, and the current administrative names go from Hikarigaoka 1st Street to 7th Street (丁目, chōme).

== Geography ==
Hikarigaoka consists primarily of Hikarigaoka Park Town (Hikarigaoka Danchi), a planned residential complex and park town developed on the 186-hectare site of the former Grant Heights military housing complex following its return to Japan. The master plan allocated the entire neighborhood's land area to public housing complexes constructed by the Urban Renaissance Agency (UR) and the Tokyo Metropolitan Housing Supply Corporation (JKK Tokyo), educational institutions, and public parkland.

At the core of the neighborhood lies Hikarigaoka Park, a 60-hectare metropolitan park with athletic fields, a public library, tennis courts, and a baseball stadium. Next to Hikarigaoka Station is Hikarigaoka IMA, the neighborhood's primary commercial center housing department stores, supermarkets, and a food hall.

It borders with the Asahichō, Takamatsu, Kasugachō, and Tagara neighborhoods in Nerima Ward, and with the Akatsuka-Shinmachi neighborhood in Itabashi Ward.

== History ==
Originally, the area spanned Tagara, Takamatsu, and Shimo-Doshida village in Toshima County, Musashi Province, and was a vast agricultural area.

In the center of the district, near the current Nerima Hikarigaoka Hospital of the Association for Regional Medical Promotion, the Tagara River (called the Doshida River in the Edo period) and the Tagara Irrigation Canal (which splits off from the Tagara River at a diversion weir near the current Hikarigaoka Second Apartments) flow from west to east, with rice paddies in the eastern part of the basin and Nerima daikon fields in parts of the north and south. The northwest part of the district (around Fureai Bridge) was once the domain of the Morioka Domain and was home to a farm mountain known as Nanbuyama. This rural area, with winding farm roads and forests dotted with residential areas, was home to approximately 80 households just before the construction of Narimasu Airport.

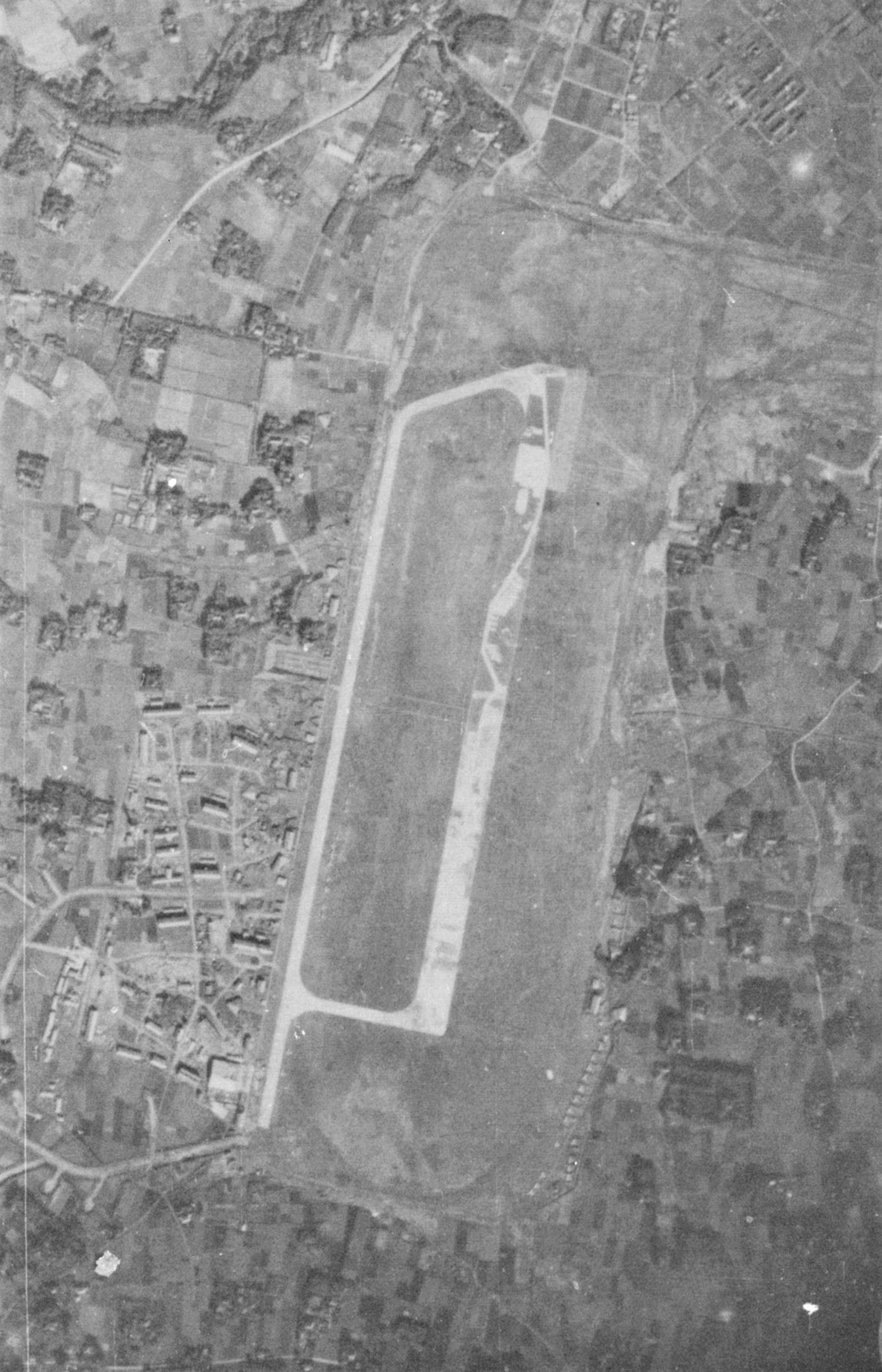
The Imperial Japanese Army's Narimasu Airfield in October, 1944

During the Second World War, the Imperial Japanese Army built and operated Narimasu Airfield in 1943 in the area as a base for the capital's air defense. At its peak, the earthworks were rushed, with 3,000 people working in day and night shifts each day. The Imperial Japanese Army's 47th Air Squadron, 43rd Airfield Battalion, and the Narimasu Detachment Maintenance Unit of the Tachikawa Branch of the Air Arsenal were based there. Towards the end of the war, it became a place for the Southern Operation Squadron to regain its fighting strength, and the 48th and 231st Shinbu Special Attack Units were stationed here and used it as a training ground. In addition, the 101st, 102nd, and 103rd Air Squadrons were also relocated there.

During the occupation of Japan, the occupying Allied forces renamed the former Narimasu Airfield to Grant Heights on March 3, 1947. On April 5, the construction of family quarters for the United States Army Air Forces began, and was finished in June, 1948.

The land was returned to Japan in 1973, after which redevelopment began to convert the former military housing into Hikarigaoka Park and a high-density urban housing complex known as Hikarigaoka Park Town. Remnants of its wartime infrastructure can still be seen today, including former runway paths incorporated into local thoroughfares.

== Transportation ==
- Subway: Hikarigaoka Station is the northern terminal station of the Toei Oedo Line, operated by the Tokyo Metropolitan Bureau of Transportation. Opened in December 1991, the station provides direct subway service to major Tokyo hubs including Shinjuku, Roppongi, and Daimon.
- Bus: Local bus transit is operated primarily by Seibu Bus and Kokusai Kogyo Bus, providing routes that connect Hikarigaoka Station to Narimasu Station, Ikebukuro Station, and nearby municipal routes, as well as Nerima Ward's "Midori Bus" community services.

=== Historical transit ===
From 1946 to 1959, the area was served by the Tōbu Keishi Line (東武啓志線, Tōbu Keishi-sen), also known as the KC Line (ケーシー線). Operated by Tōbu Railway, the 6.3-kilometer military freight and passenger line ran from Kami-Itabashi Station on the Tōbu Tōjō Line to transport fuel, supplies, and personnel to the U.S. military complex at Grant Heights. Its terminus, KC Station (Keishi Station), was situated just north of present-day Hikarigaoka Akinoyo Primary School.

== In popular culture ==
- Hikarigaoka features as a prominent location in the 1999 anime series Digimon Adventure. It serves as the setting for the prequel film to the series and is established as the former residence of the Chosen Children before they moved to Odaiba. Hikarigaoka is also featured in several episodes of the sequel series, Digimon Adventure 02. In the English dub of the series, the location was localized as Highton View Terrace.
- Hikarigaoka Park Town and Hikarigaoka Park are frequently used as outdoor filming locations for Japanese tokusatsu television productions, including the Super Sentai and Kamen Rider franchises.
