= Chikatetsu-akatsuka Station =

Metro station in Tokyo, Japan

Coordinates: 35.769945°N 139.644052°E

Chikatetsu-akatsuka Station 地下鉄赤塚駅

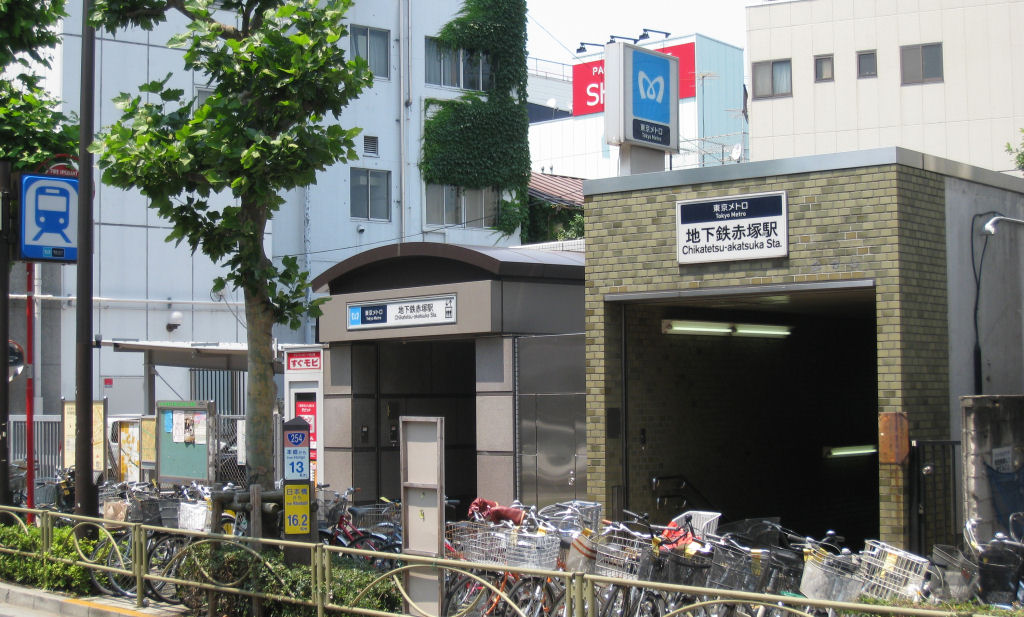
- No. 3 entrance, June 2008

Japanese name
- Shinjitai: 地下鉄赤塚駅
- Kyūjitai: 地下銕赤塚驛
- Hiragana: ちかてつあかつかえき

General information
- Location: 8-37-16 Kitamachi, Nerima City, Tokyo; Japan
- Operator: Tokyo Metro
- Lines: Yūrakuchō Line; Fukutoshin Line
- Platforms: 1 island platform
- Tracks: 2

Construction
- Structure type: Underground

Other information
- Station code: F-03, Y-03

History
- Opened: 24 June 1983; 43 years ago
- Former names: Eidan-Akatsuka (until 2004)

Services
Preceding station	Tokyo Metro	Following station
Chikatetsu-narimasu towards Wakoshi	Yūrakuchō Line	Heiwadai towards Shin-kiba
Chikatetsu-narimasu towards Wakoshi	Fukutoshin Line Commuter Express Local	Heiwadai towards Shibuya
Location
- Location within Special wards of Tokyo Location within Tokyo Bay and Bōsō Peninsula Location within Tokyo Location within Japan

Chikatetsu-akatsuka Station (地下鉄赤塚駅, Chikatetsu-akatsuka-eki) is a subway station in Nerima, Tokyo, Japan, operated by Tokyo Metro.

== Lines ==
Chikatetsu-Akatsuka Station is served by the Tokyo Metro Yūrakuchō Line (station Y-03) and Tokyo Metro Fukutoshin Line (station F-03), and is located 3.6 km from the terminus of the two lines at Wakōshi.

== Station layout ==
The station consists of an island platform serving two tracks. The platforms are equipped with waist-height platform edge doors.

=== Platforms ===
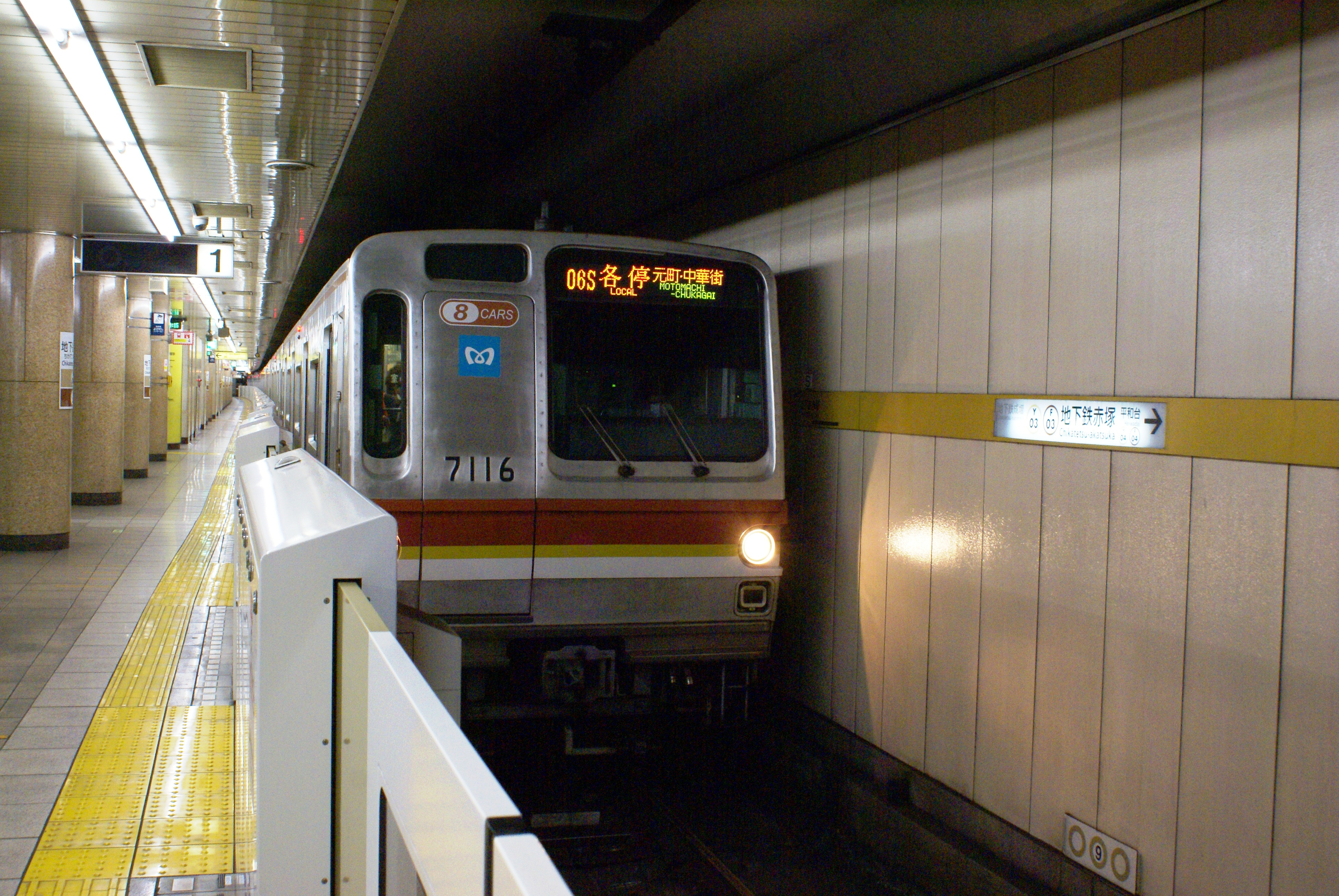
A Motomachi-Chukagai-bound train approaches the platform, 2013

1
Yūrakuchō Line
for Kotake-mukaihara, Ikebukuro, Yūrakuchō, and Shin-Kiba
Fukutoshin Line
- for Kotake-mukaihara, Ikebukuro, Shinjuku-sanchōme, and Shibuya
- Tōyoko Line for Yokohama
- Minatomirai Line for Motomachi-Chukagai
- Sōtetsu Izumino Line for Shōnandai via Shin-yokohama Line
2
Yūrakuchō Line
for Wakōshi
Tobu Tojo Line for Shiki, Kawagoeshi, and Shinrinkōen
Fukutoshin Line
for Wakōshi
Tobu Tojo Line for Shiki, Kawagoeshi, and Shinrinkōen

== History ==
The station opened on 24 June 1983 as Eidan-Akatsuka Station. It was renamed Chikatetsu-Akatsuka on 1 April 2004, coinciding with the privatization of Teito Rapid Transit Authority (TRTA).

Waist-height platform edge doors were installed in September 2010.

== Surrounding area ==
- Shimo-Akatsuka Station (on the Tōbu Tōjō Line)
- Jōrenji Temple
- Hikarigaoka Park
