= Heiwadai Station (Tokyo) =

Metro station in Tokyo, Japan

Coordinates: 35.757744°N 139.653955°E

Heiwadai Station 平和台駅

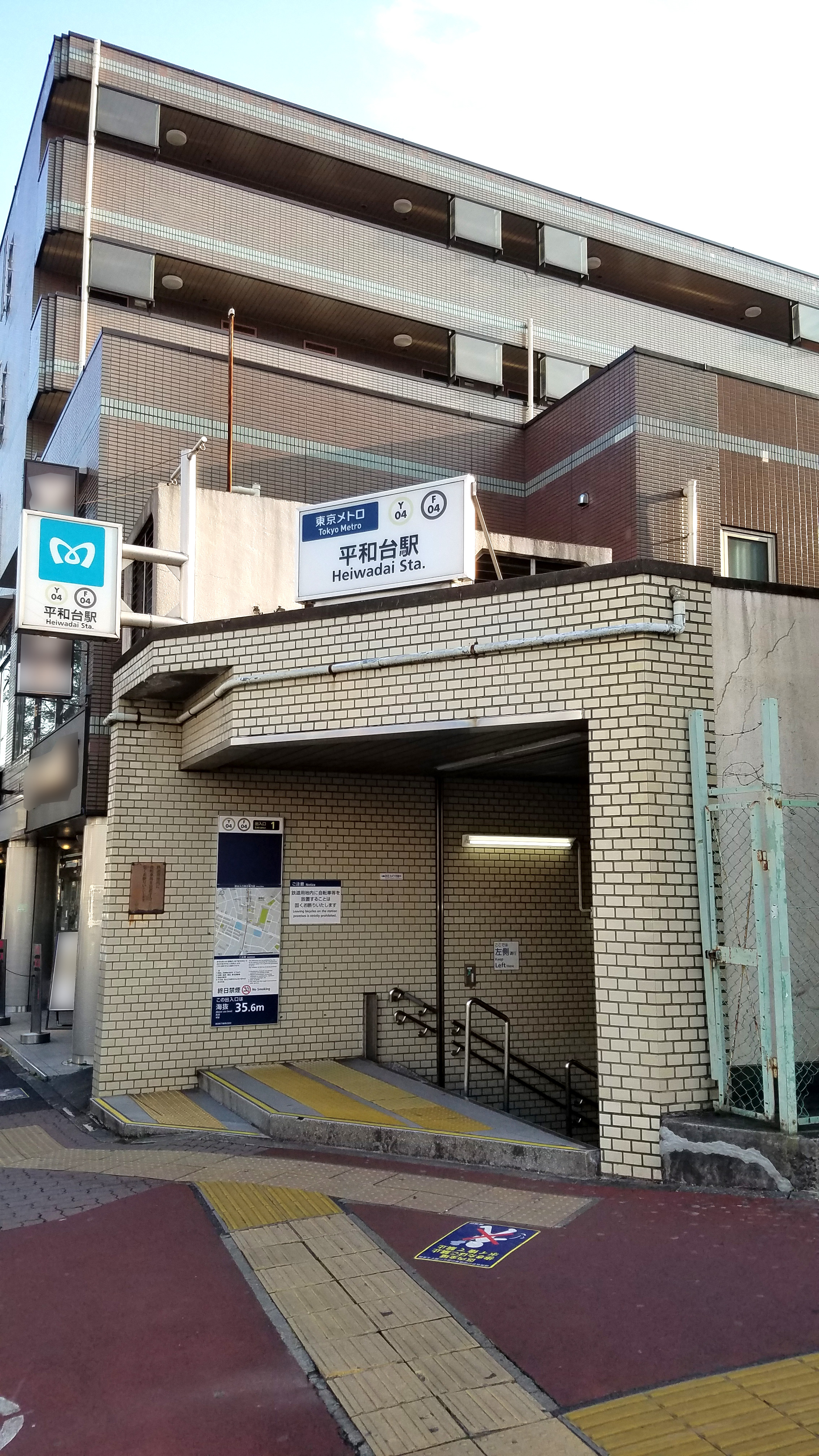
- The no.1 entrance to the station in December 2021

General information
- Location: 2-17-48 Hayamiya, Nerima, Tokyo （東京都練馬区早宮2-17-48） Japan
- Operator: Tokyo Metro
- Lines: Yūrakuchō Line; Fukutoshin Line
- Platforms: 1 island platform
- Tracks: 2

Construction
- Structure type: Underground

Other information
- Station code: F-04, Y-04

History
- Opened: 24 June 1983; 43 years ago

Services
| Preceding station | Tokyo Metro | Following station |
|---|---|---|
| Chikatetsu-akatsuka towards Wakoshi | Yūrakuchō Line | Hikawadai towards Shin-kiba |
| Chikatetsu-akatsuka towards Wakoshi | Fukutoshin Line Commuter Express Local | Hikawadai towards Shibuya |
Location
- Location within Special wards of Tokyo Location within Tokyo Bay and Bōsō Peninsula Location within Tokyo Location within Japan

Heiwadai Station (平和台駅, Heiwadai-eki) is a subway station in Nerima, Tokyo, Japan, operated by Tokyo Metro.

== Lines ==
Heiwadai Station is served by the Tokyo Metro Yūrakuchō Line (station Y-04) and Tokyo Metro Fukutoshin Line (station F-04), and is located 5.4 km from the terminus of the two lines at Wakōshi.

== Station layout ==
The station consists of an island platform serving two tracks. The platforms are equipped with waist-height platform edge doors.

=== Platforms ===
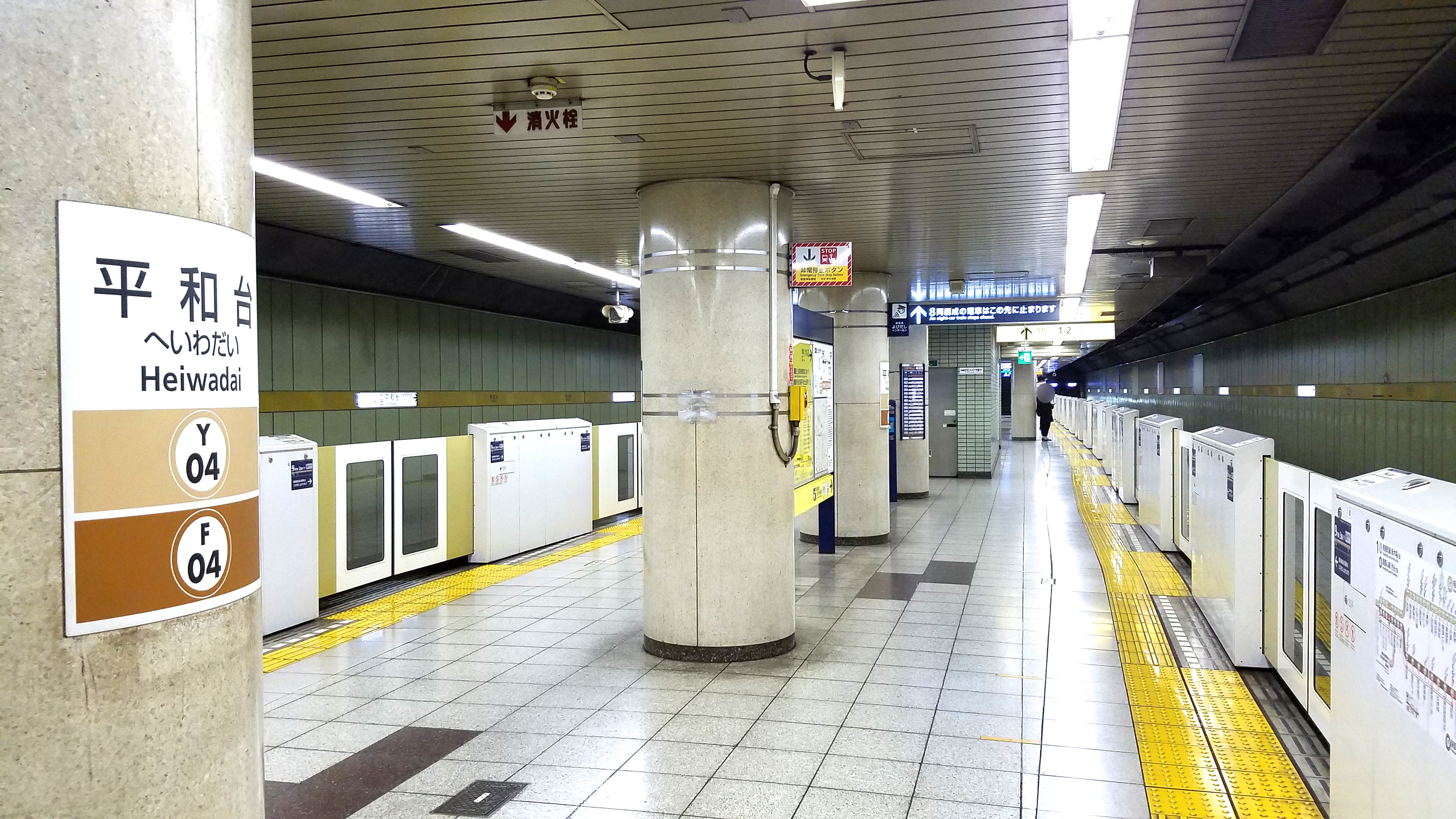
The platform in December 2021

1
Yūrakuchō Line
for Kotake-mukaihara, Ikebukuro, Yūrakuchō, and Shin-Kiba
Fukutoshin Line
- for Kotake-mukaihara, Ikebukuro, Shinjuku-sanchōme, and Shibuya
- Tōyoko Line for Yokohama
- Minatomirai Line for Motomachi-Chukagai
- Sōtetsu Izumino Line for Shōnandai via Shin-yokohama Line
2
Yūrakuchō Line
for Wakōshi
Tobu Tojo Line for Shiki, Kawagoeshi, and Shinrinkōen
Fukutoshin Line
for Wakōshi
Tobu Tojo Line for Shiki, Kawagoeshi, and Shinrinkōen

== History ==
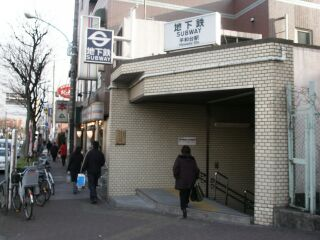
Station entrance before privatization

Heiwadai Station opened on 24 June 1983, on the Yūrakuchō Line.

The station facilities were inherited by Tokyo Metro after the privatization of the Teito Rapid Transit Authority (TRTA) in 2004.

Fukutoshin Line services commenced on 14 June 2008.

Waist-height platform edge doors were installed in September 2010.

== Surrounding area ==
- Japanese Ground Self Defense Force Camp Nerima
- Nerima-kasugachō Station (on the Toei Ōedo Line)
