= Hikarigaoka Park =

Park in Nerima and Itabashi, Tokyo, Japan

- 光が丘公園
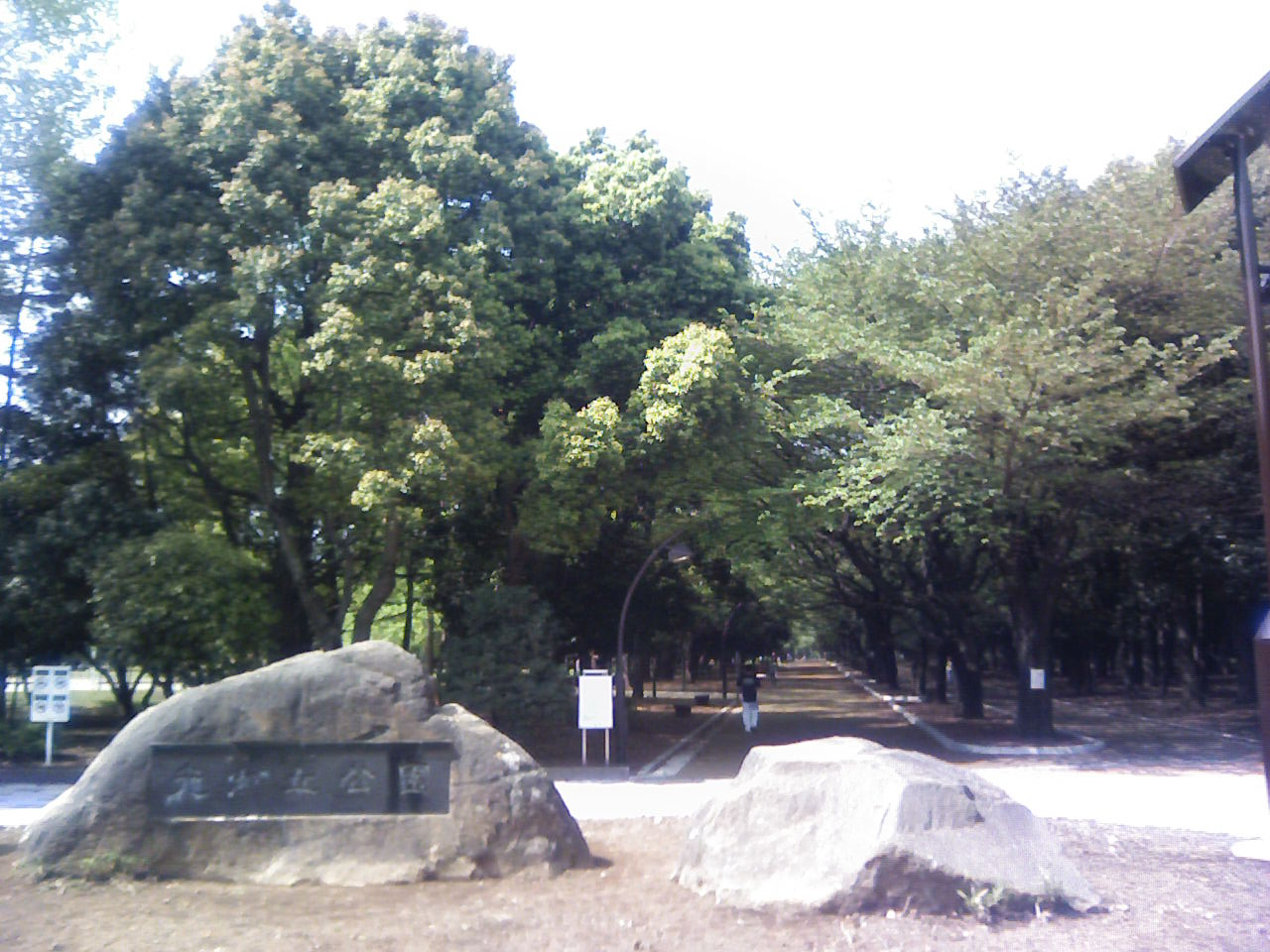
- Looking southwest from the Akatsuka Exit
- Interactive map of Hikarigaoka Park
- Type: Metropolitan park
- Location: Nerima Ward and Itabashi Ward, Tokyo, Japan
- Coordinates: 35.763789°N 139.628211°E
- Area: 607,823 square metres (150.196 acres)
- Created: 11 March 1974
- Public transit: Hikarigaoka Station

Hikarigaoka Park (光が丘公園, Hikarigaoka Kōen) is a metropolitan park located in the Hikarigaoka and Asahichō areas of Nerima Ward and the Akatsuka-shinmachi area of Itabashi Ward in Tokyo, Japan. Over 98% of the park lies within Nerima Ward, with only the north-eastern corner extending into Itabashi Ward. With an area of 607,823 square metres (150.196 acres), it is one of the largest metropolitan parks in Tokyo.

The park opened on 11 March 1974 on land that had previously been used as the U.S. military housing complex known as Grant Heights following World War II.

== Facilities ==
- Baseball fields (4)
- Athletics field (400 m track, dirt surface)
- Tennis courts (8, artificial grass)
- Monument Arch of Light (光のアーチ, Hikari no Āchi)
- Fountain
- Day campground (reservation required)
- Barbecue area (reservation required)
- Gateball field
- Youth soccer field
- Kyūdō hall (90 m range)
- Bird sanctuary
- Tennis practice wall
- Children's play area
- Hikarigaoka Library
- Hikarigaoka Gymnasium

== Events ==
The park hosts a variety of public events throughout the year. During Golden Week, the Mongolian cultural festival Hawarin Bayar (meaning "Spring Festival" in Mongolian) is held in the park and is one of the largest Mongolian cultural events in Japan.

== Access ==
=== By train ===
- Toei Oedo Line: Hikarigaoka Station (8 minutes' walk)
- Tokyo Metro Yurakucho Line / Fukutoshin Line: Chikatetsu-Akatsuka Station (13 minutes' walk)
- Tokyo Metro Yurakucho Line / Fukutoshin Line: Chikatetsu-Narimasu Station (15 minutes' walk)

=== By bus ===
From Narimasu Station on the Tobu Tojo Line, take the Seibu Bus toward Hikarigaoka Station and get off at Hikarigaoka Park North (less than one minute's walk).

=== By car ===
Parking spaces: 234. Price: 300 yen for the first hour, 100 yen every 30 minutes thereafter.

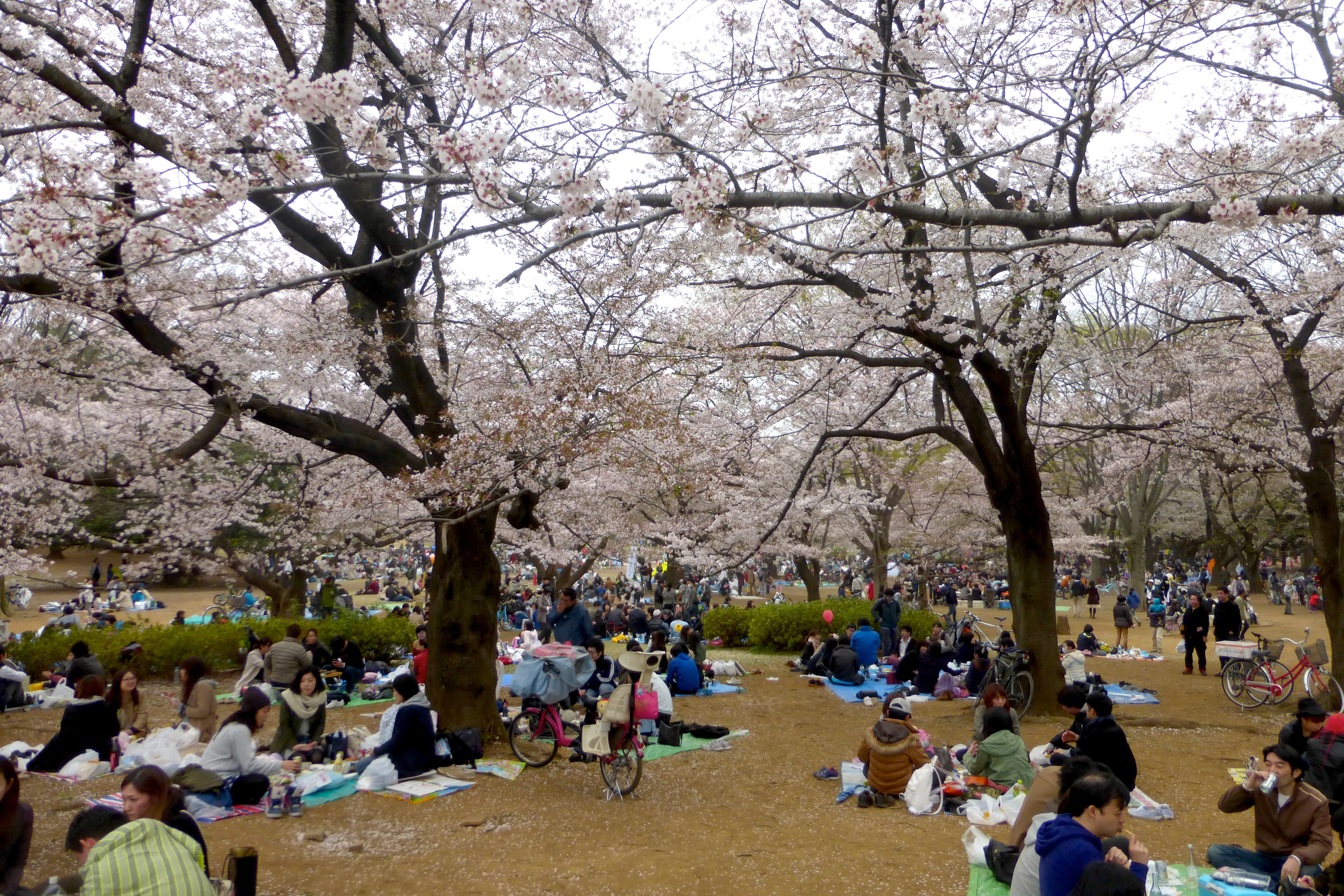
Cherry blossom viewing (hanami)

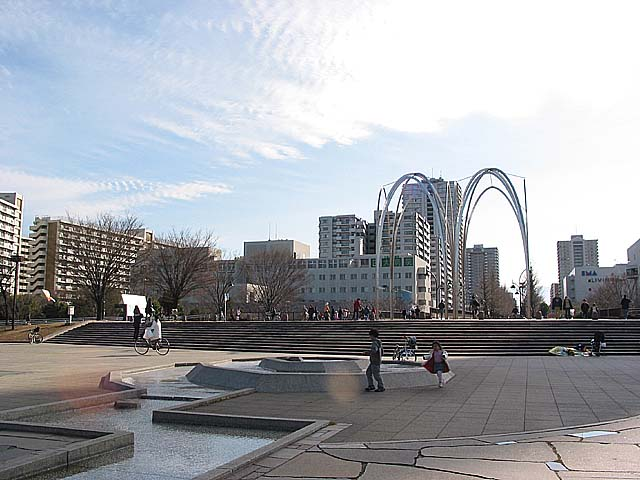
Fountain and monument "Arch of Light"

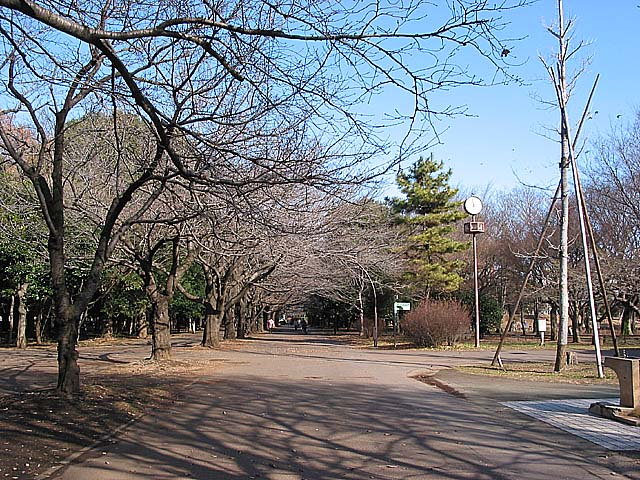
Large clock and wooded area

== See also ==
- Parks and gardens in Tokyo
- National Parks of Japan

== Sources ==
- "Hikarigaoka Park". Tokyo Metropolitan Park Association.
- "Hikarigaoka Park". Tokyo Convention & Visitors Bureau.
