= Hikawadai Station =

Metro station in Tokyo, Japan

Coordinates: 35.749782°N 139.665102°E

Hikawadai Station 氷川台駅

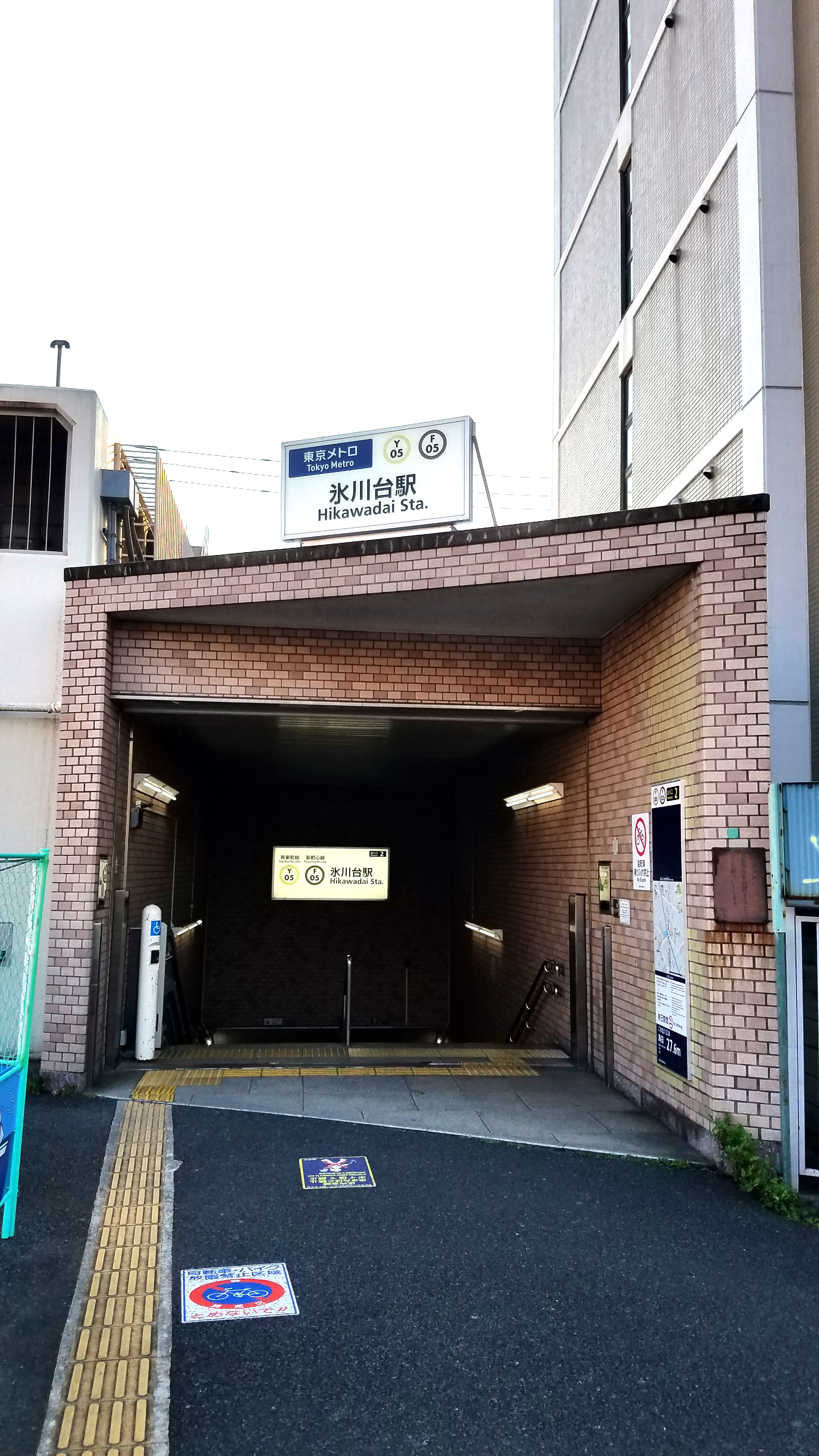
- The no.2 entrance in December 2021

Japanese name
- Shinjitai: 氷川台駅
- Kyūjitai: 冰川臺驛
- Hiragana: ひかわだいえき

General information
- Location: 3-38-18 Hikawadai, Nerima City, Tokyo; Japan
- Operator: Tokyo Metro
- Lines: Yūrakuchō Line; Fukutoshin Line
- Distance: 6.8 km (4.2 mi) from Wakoshi
- Platforms: 2 side platforms
- Tracks: 2

Construction
- Structure type: Underground

Other information
- Station code: F-05, Y-05

History
- Opened: 24 June 1983; 43 years ago

Services
Preceding station	Tokyo Metro	Following station
Heiwadai towards Wakoshi	Yūrakuchō Line	Kotake-mukaihara towards Shin-kiba
Heiwadai towards Wakoshi	Fukutoshin Line Commuter Express Local	Kotake-mukaihara towards Shibuya
Location
- Location within Special wards of Tokyo Location within Tokyo Bay and Bōsō Peninsula Location within Tokyo Location within Japan

Hikawadai Station (氷川台駅, Hikawadai-eki) is a subway station in Nerima, Tokyo, Japan, operated by the Tokyo subway operator Tokyo Metro.

== Lines ==
Hikawadai Station is served by the Tokyo Metro Yūrakuchō Line (station Y-05) and Tokyo Metro Fukutoshin Line (station F-05), and it is located 6.8 km from the starting point of the two lines at Wakōshi.

== Station layout ==
The station consists of two opposed side platforms serving two tracks shared by both Yurakucho Line and Fukutoshin Line services. The platforms are equipped with chest-height platform edge doors.

=== Platforms ===
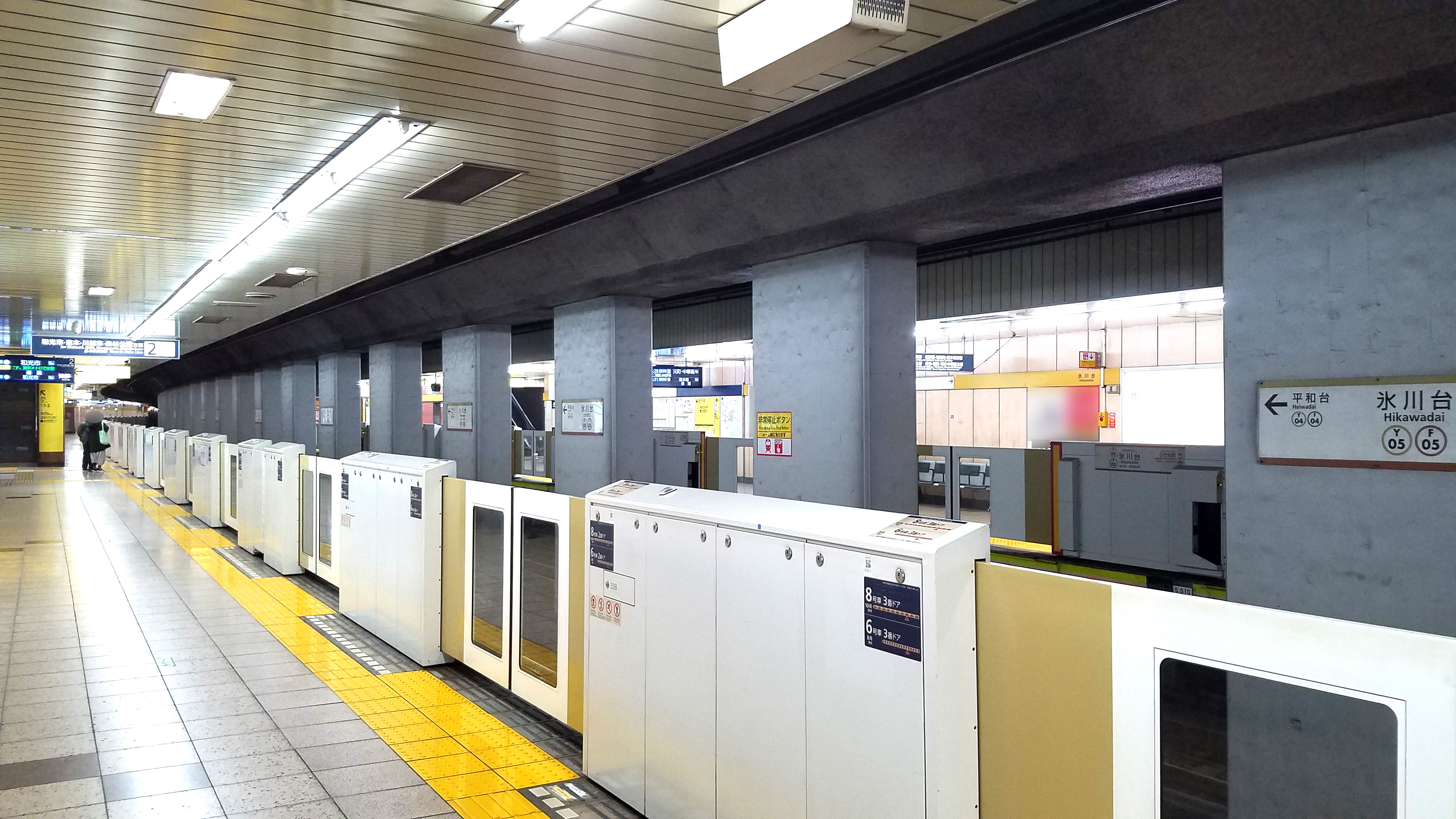
View from platform 2 in December 2021

1
Yūrakuchō Line
for Kotake-mukaihara, Ikebukuro, Yūrakuchō, and Shin-Kiba
Fukutoshin Line
- for Kotake-mukaihara, Ikebukuro, Shinjuku-sanchōme, and Shibuya
- Tōyoko Line for Yokohama
- Minatomirai Line for Motomachi-Chukagai
- Sōtetsu Izumino Line for Shōnandai via Shin-yokohama Line
2
Yūrakuchō Line
for Wakōshi
Tobu Tojo Line for Shiki, Kawagoeshi, and Shinrinkōen
Fukutoshin Line
for Wakōshi
Tobu Tojo Line for Shiki, Kawagoeshi, and Shinrinkōen

== History ==
The station opened on 24 June 1983, on the Yūrakuchō Line. Fukutoshin Line services commenced on 14 June 2008.

The station facilities were inherited by Tokyo Metro after the privatization of the Teito Rapid Transit Authority (TRTA) in 2004.

Chest-height platform edge doors were installed in August 2010.

In 2026 Hikawadai station is planned to have the first Tokyo Metro "Thrilling Elevator" designed to provide a more immersive elevator experience.

== Surrounding area ==
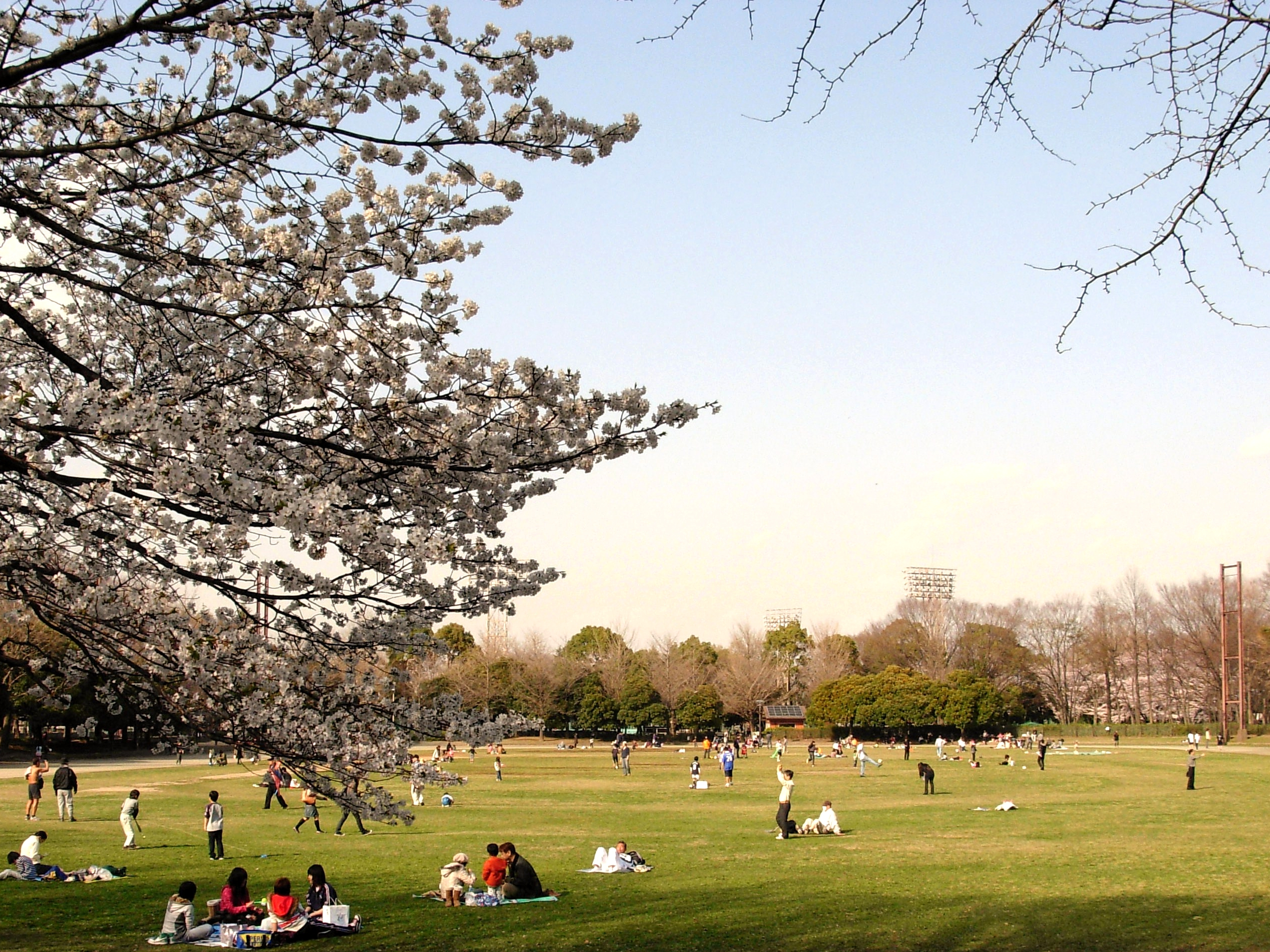
Johoku-Chuo Park in April 2010

- Shakujii River
- Hikawa Shrine
- Johoku-Chuo Park
- Tokyo Oyama High School

== See also ==
- List of railway stations in Japan
