= Chikatetsu-narimasu Station =

Metro station in Tokyo, Japan

Coordinates: 35.776557°N 139.63151°E

Chikatetsu-narimasu Station 地下鉄成増駅

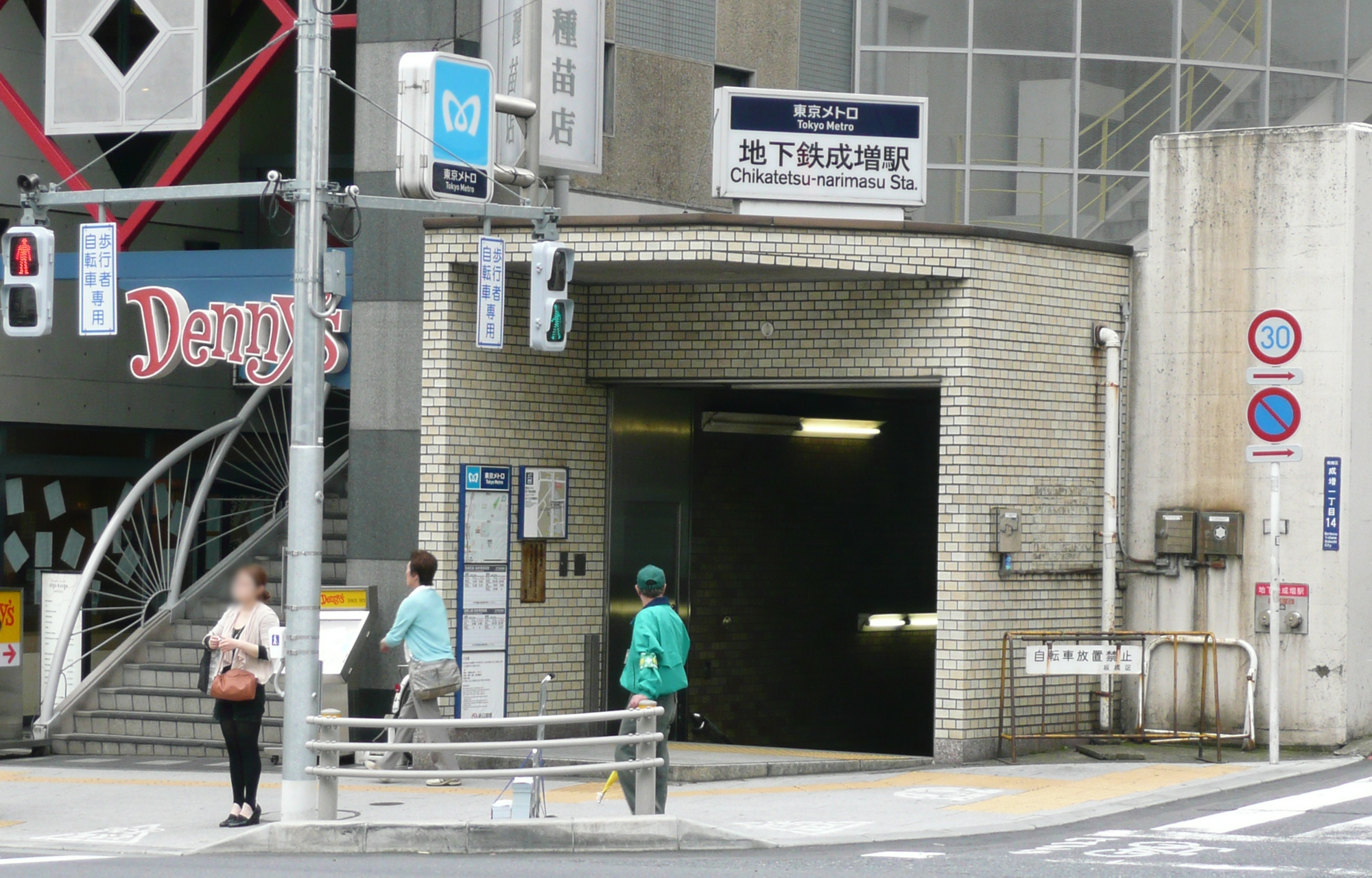
- Exit No. 4 of Chikatetsu-narimasu Station, May 2012

Japanese name
- Shinjitai: 地下鉄成増駅
- Kyūjitai: 地下銕成增驛
- Hiragana: ちかてつなりますえき

General information
- Location: 2-11-3 Narimasu, Itabashi, Tokyo; Japan
- Operator: Tokyo Metro
- Lines: Yūrakuchō Line; Fukutoshin Line
- Platforms: 1 island platform
- Tracks: 2

Construction
- Structure type: Underground

Other information
- Station code: F-02, Y-02

History
- Opened: 24 June 1983; 43 years ago
- Former names: Eidan-Narimasu (until 2004)

Services
| Preceding station | Tokyo Metro | Following station |
|---|---|---|
| Wakoshi Terminus | Yūrakuchō Line | Chikatetsu-akatsuka towards Shin-kiba |
| Wakoshi Terminus | Fukutoshin Line Commuter Express Local | Chikatetsu-akatsuka towards Shibuya |
Location
- Location within Special wards of Tokyo Location within Tokyo Bay and Bōsō Peninsula Location within Tokyo Location within Japan

Chikatetsu-narimasu Station (地下鉄成増駅, Chikatetsu-narimasu-eki) is a subway station in Itabashi, Tokyo, Japan, operated by Tokyo Metro.

== Lines ==
Chikatetsu-narimasu Station is served by the Tokyo Metro Yūrakuchō Line (station Y-02) and Tokyo Metro Fukutoshin Line (station F-02), and is located 2.2 km from the terminus of the two lines at Wakōshi.

== Station layout ==
The station consists of an island platform serving two tracks. The platforms are equipped with waist-height platform edge doors. The station is wheelchair-accessible.

=== Platforms ===
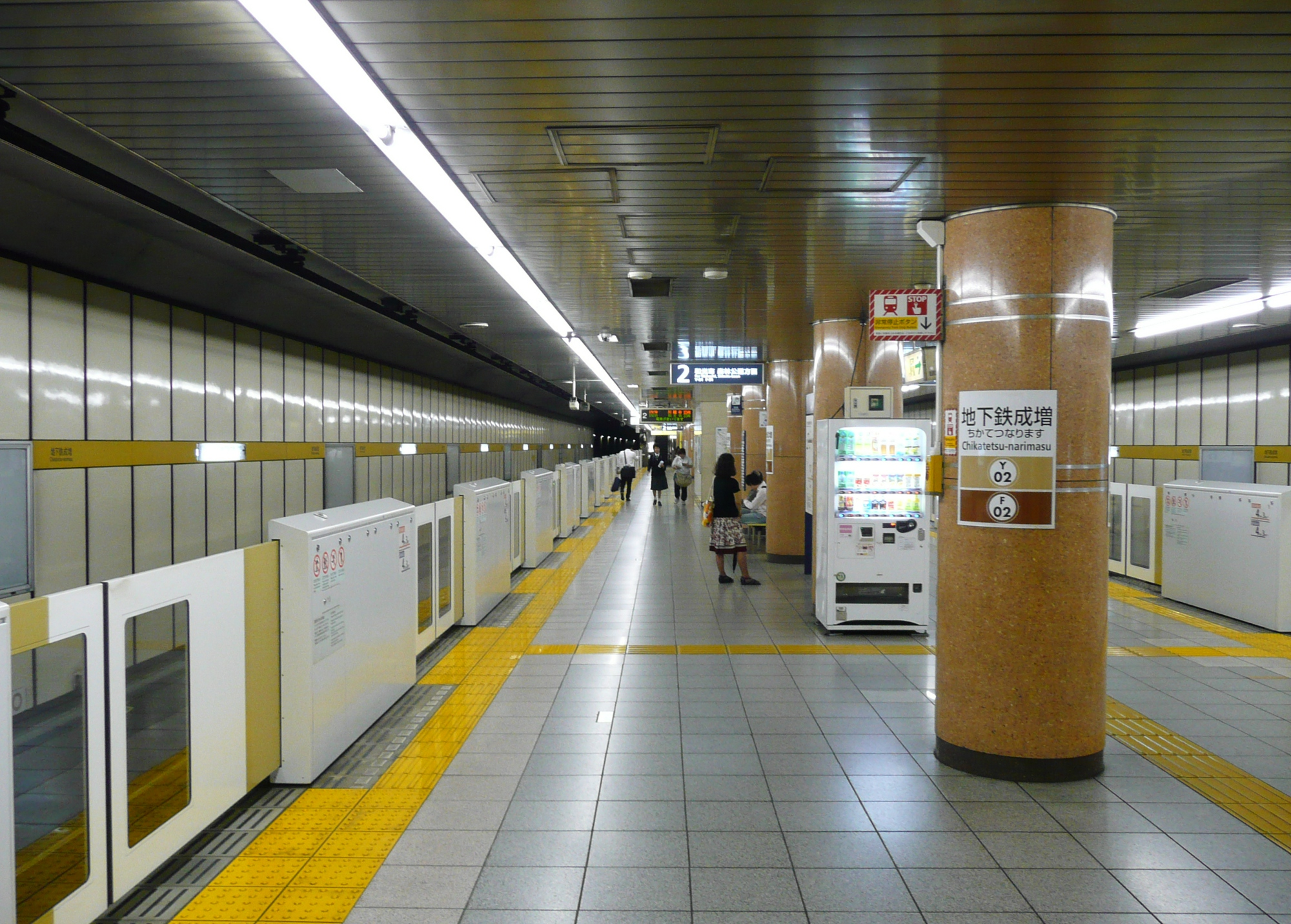
View of the platforms, May 2012

1
Yūrakuchō Line
for Kotake-mukaihara, Ikebukuro, Yūrakuchō, and Shin-Kiba
Fukutoshin Line
- for Kotake-mukaihara, Ikebukuro, Shinjuku-sanchōme, and Shibuya
- Tōyoko Line for Yokohama
- Minatomirai Line for Motomachi-Chukagai
- Sōtetsu Izumino Line for Shōnandai via Shin-yokohama Line
2
Yūrakuchō Line
for Wakōshi
Tobu Tojo Line for Shiki, Kawagoeshi, and Shinrinkōen
Fukutoshin Line
for Wakōshi
Tobu Tojo Line for Shiki, Kawagoeshi, and Shinrinkōen

== History ==
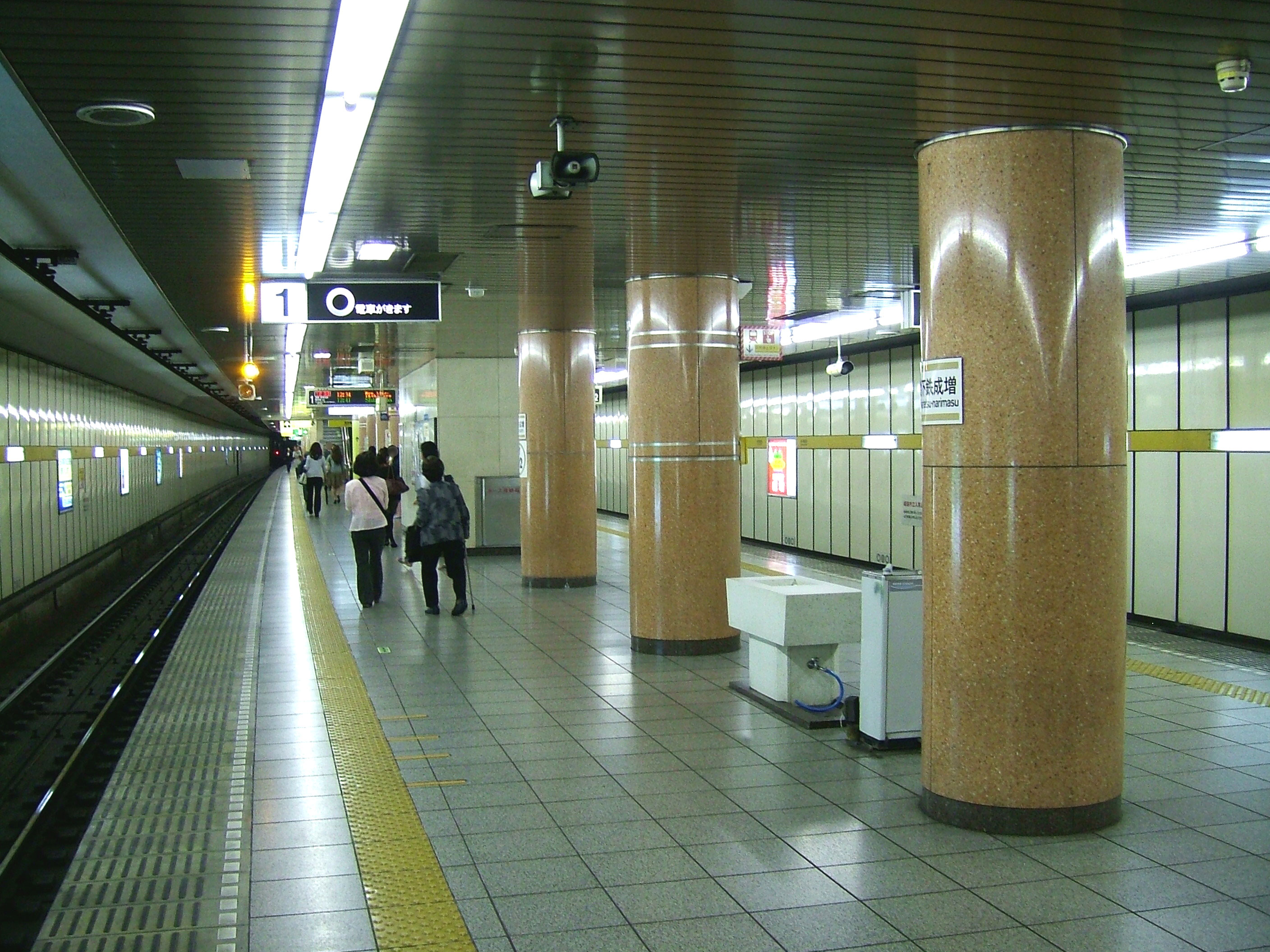
View of the platforms in May 2008 before the addition of platform edge doors

The station was opened as Eidan-Narimasu Station on June 24, 1983 as the terminus of the Yūrakuchō Line from Shintomichō by the Teito Rapid Transit Authority (TRTA). It became a through station when the line was extended to Wakōshi on August 25, 1987.

The Yūrakuchō New Line (the predecessor of today's Fukutoshin Line) began serving the station on December 7, 1994.

The station gained its current name when the Teito Rapid Transit Authority (known as Teito Kōsokudo Kōtsū Eidan in Japanese) was privatised and became Tokyo Metro on April 1, 2004. The Yūrakuchō New Line was extended and renamed on June 14, 2008.

Waist-height platform edge doors were installed in October 2010.

== Surrounding area ==
- Narimasu Station (on the Tōbu Tōjō Line)
