= Wakōshi Station =

Railway and metro station in Wakō, Saitama Prefecture, Japan

TJ11 Wakōshi Station 和光市駅

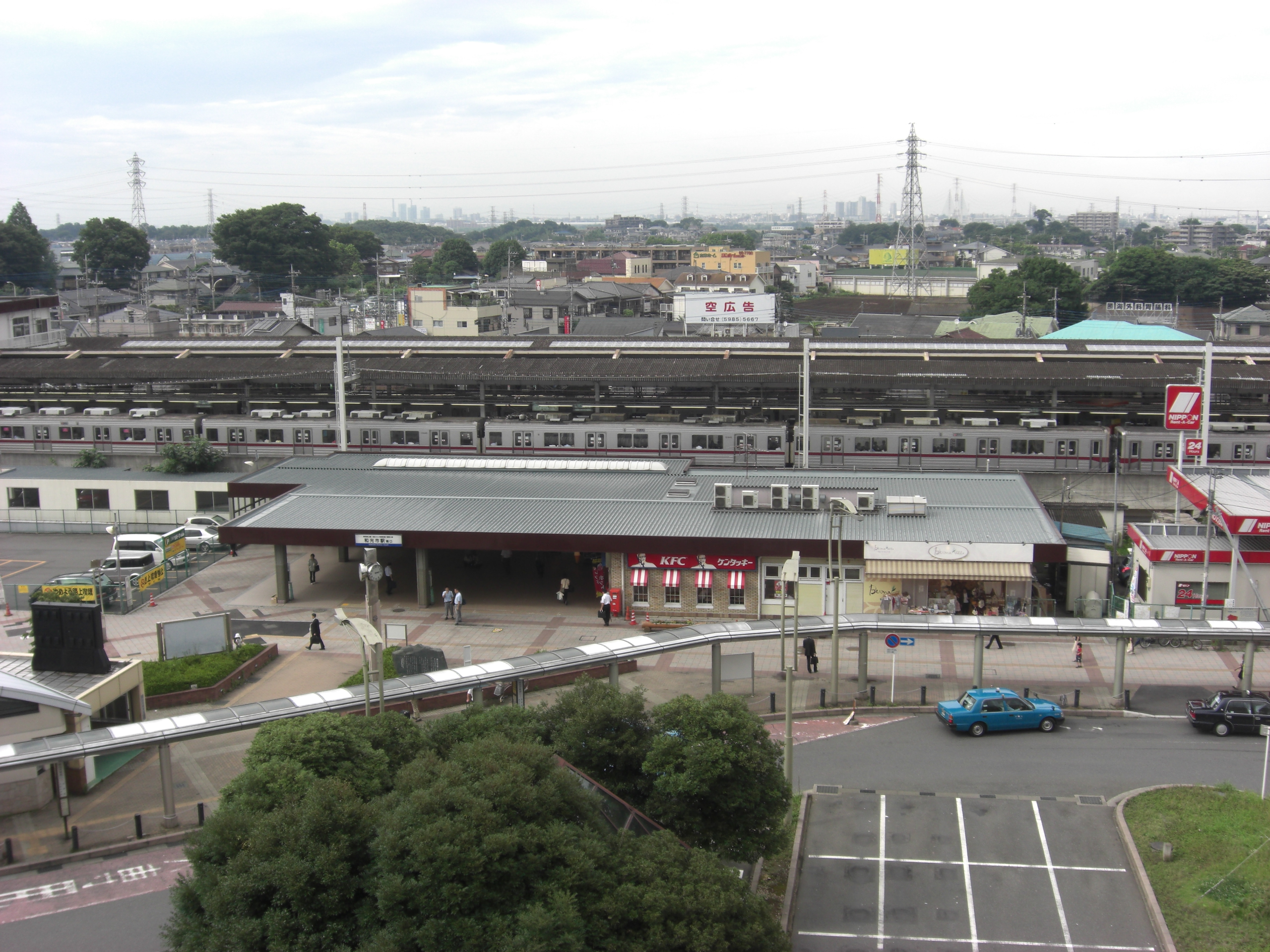
- General view of the station from the south side in July 2008

General information
- Location: 4-6 Honchō, Wakō City, Saitama Prefecture 351-0114; Japan
- Coordinates: 35.788407°N 139.612885°E
- Operator: Tōbu Railway (manager); Tokyo Metro
- Lines: Tōbu Tōjō Line; Yūrakuchō Line; Fukutoshin Line
- Distance: 12.5 km (7.8 mi) from Ikebukuro
- Platforms: 2 island platforms
- Tracks: 4
- Connections: Bus terminal

Construction
- Structure type: Embankment
- Accessible: Yes

Other information
- Status: Staffed
- Station code: TJ-11, Y-01, F-01

History
- Opened: 1 February 1934; 92 years ago
- Former names: Niikura (to 1951); Yamato-machi (to 1970)

Passengers
- FY2019: 180,819 daily (Tōbu); 192,132 (Tokyo Metro)

Services
Preceding station	Tobu Railway	Following station
Asakadai TJ13 towards Yorii	Tojo Line Rapid Express	Ikebukuro TJ01 Terminus
Asaka TJ12 towards Yorii	Tojo Line Express Semi Express Local	Narimasu TJ10 towards Ikebukuro
Preceding station	Tokyo Metro	Following station
Asakadai TJ13 towards Ogawamachi	F Liner	Kotake-mukaihara towards Motomachi-Chūkagai
through to Tojo Line	Yūrakuchō Line	Chikatetsu-narimasu towards Shin-kiba
through to Tojo Line	Fukutoshin Line Express	Kotake-mukaihara towards Shibuya
through to Tojo Line	Fukutoshin Line Commuter Express Local	Chikatetsu-narimasu towards Shibuya
Location
- Location within Special wards of Tokyo Location within Saitama Prefecture Location within Japan

Wakōshi Station (和光市駅, Wakōshi-eki; lit. 'Wakō City Station') is an interchange passenger railway station located in Wakō, Saitama, Japan, operated by the private railway operator Tōbu Railway and Tokyo subway operator Tokyo Metro. It is the only Tokyo Metro station located in Saitama Prefecture. It is the westernmost station in the Tokyo subway network, and the northernmost Tokyo Metro station (Nishi-takashimadaira on the Toei network is farther north).

== Lines ==
Wakōshi Station is served by the Tōbu Tōjō Line from Ikebukuro to Kawagoe and Ogawamachi in Saitama Prefecture. It also forms the northern terminus of the Tokyo Metro Yurakucho Line and Tokyo Metro Fukutoshin Line, with some trains continuing northward on the Tobu Tojo Line to Shiki and Kawagoeshi. Trains continuing onto the Tobu Tojo Line from Tokyo Metro lines all change drivers here: Tobu Railway drivers take over trains from Tokyo and Tokyo Metro drivers take over trains towards Tokyo. Located between Narimasu and Asaka stations, it is 12.5 km (7.8 mi) from the Ikebukuro terminus.

== Station layout ==
The station consists of two island platforms serving four tracks. The two platforms, 2 and 3, used by Tokyo Metro services were equipped with chest-high platform edge doors in April 2012, with operation commencing in July 2012. Similar platform edge doors were installed on the Tōbu platforms, 1 and 4, in February 2016, and scheduled to be brought into operation from 26 March.

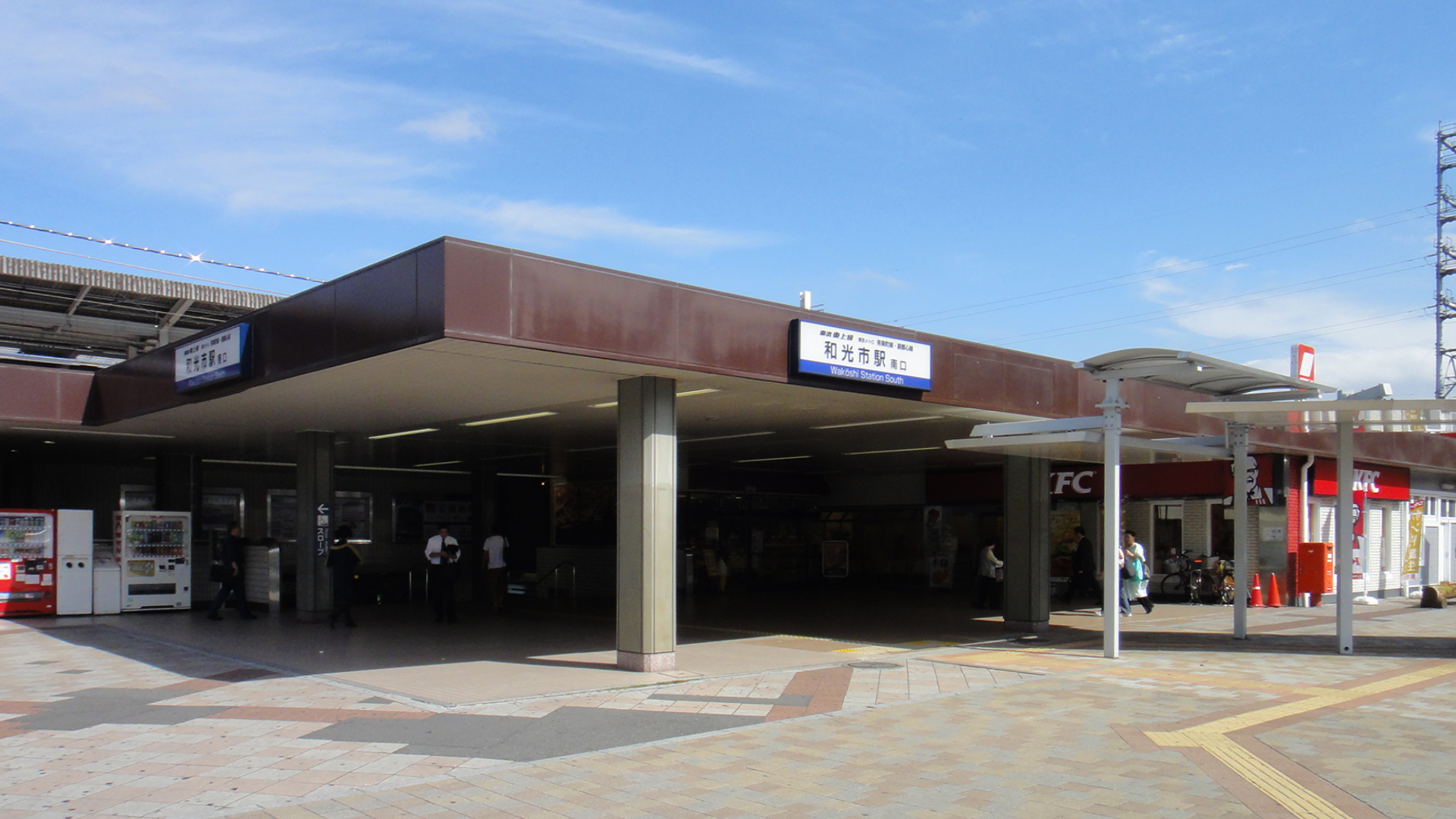
South entrance, October 2012

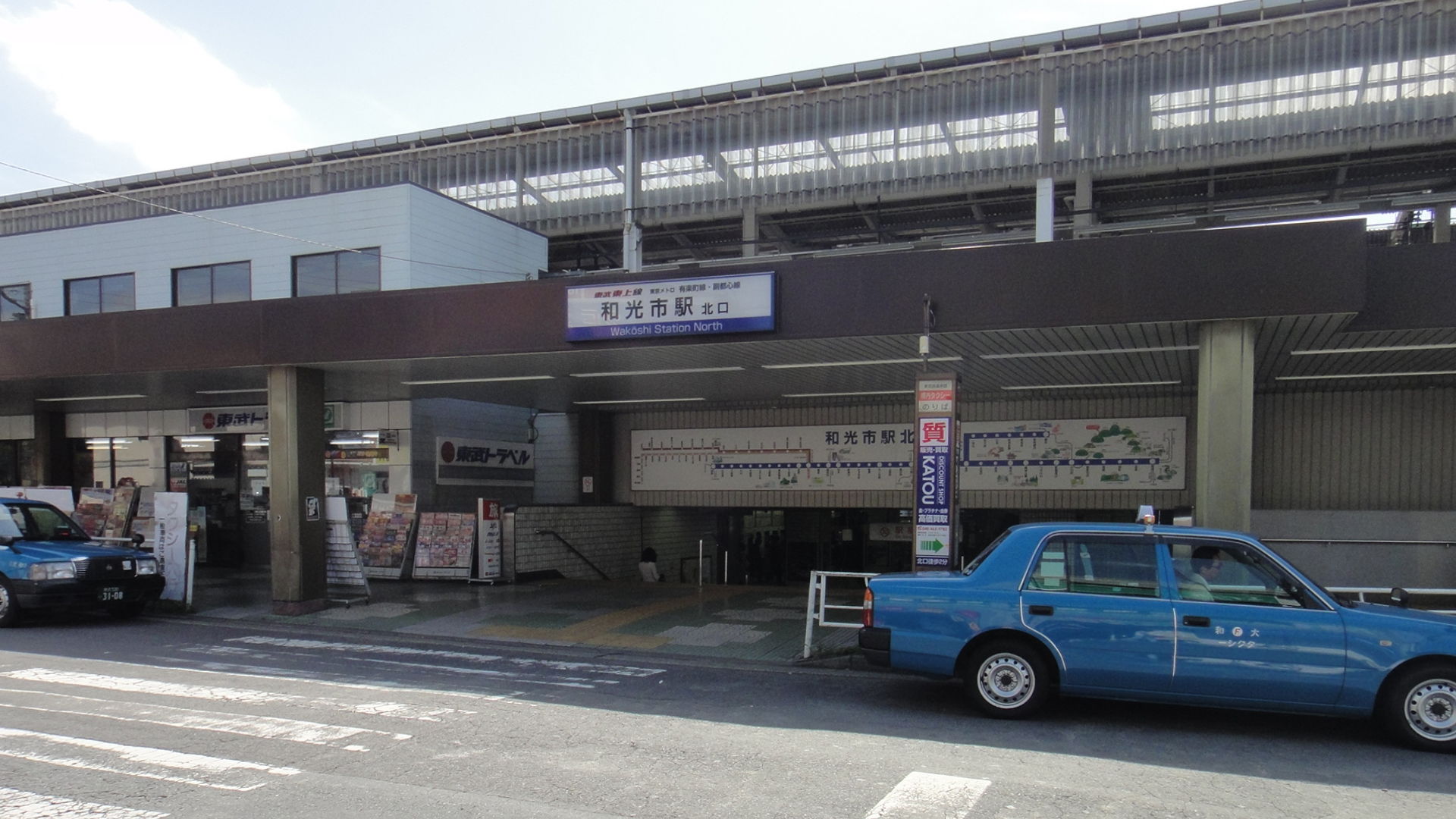
North entrance, October 2012

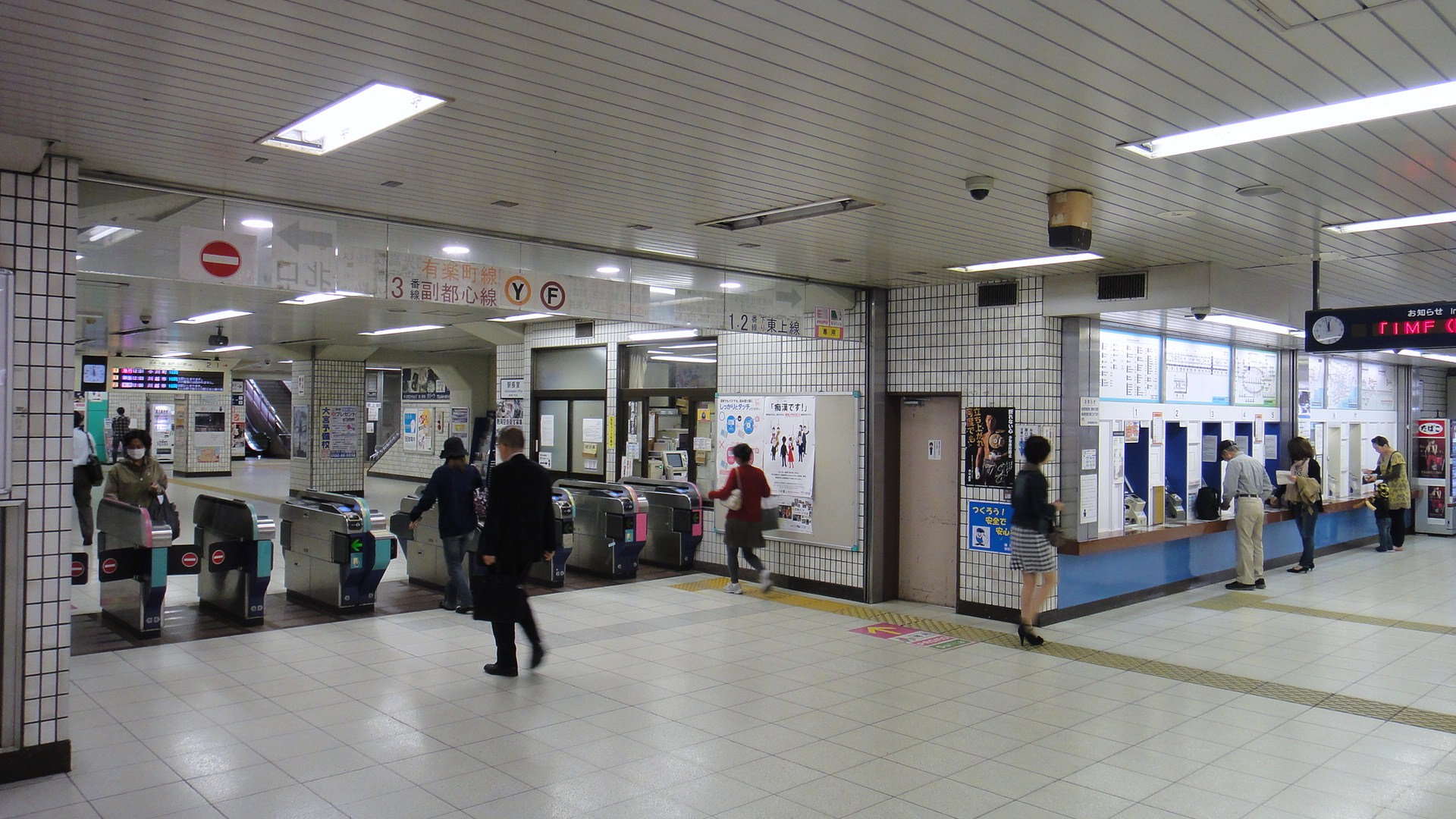
Ticket barriers, October 2012

=== Platforms ===
1	Tōbu Tōjō Line	for Shiki, Kawagoe, Shinrinkōen, Ogawamachi, and Yorii (from Ikebukuro on the Tojo Line)
2	Tōbu Tōjō Line	for Shiki, Kawagoe, and Shinrinkōen (from the Yurakucho Line & the Fukutoshin Line)
2	Yūrakuchō Line	(terminating services)
2	Fukutoshin Line	(terminating services)
3	Yūrakuchō Line	for Kotake-mukaihara, Ikebukuro, Yūrakuchō, and Shin-Kiba
3	Fukutoshin Line	for Kotake-mukaihara, Ikebukuro, Shinjuku-sanchōme, and Shibuya; Tōkyū Tōyoko Line for Hiyoshi and Yokohama; Tōkyū Shin-Yokohama Line for Shin-Yokohama via Sōtetsu Shin-Yokohama Line for Ebina and Shōnandai; Minatomirai Line for Motomachi-Chukagai
4	Tobu Tojo Line	for Narimasu, Kami-Itabashi, and Ikebukuro

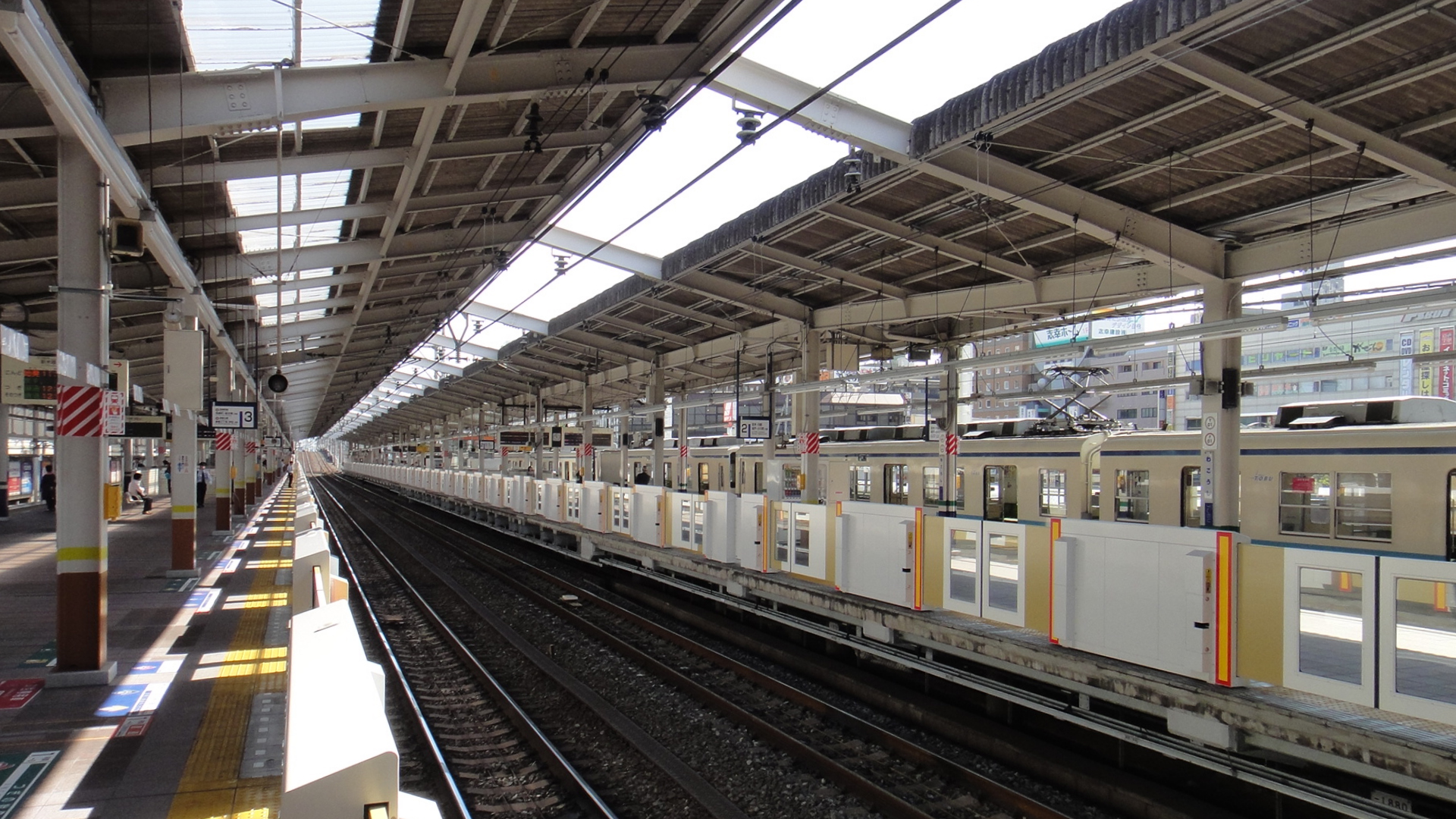
View from platforms 3/4, looking toward Ikebukuro, October 2012

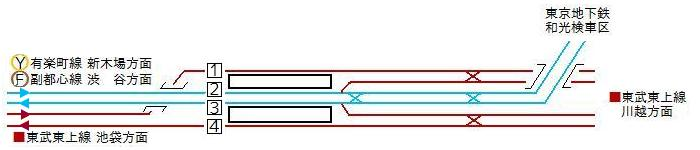
Track layout of Wakoshi station

== History ==
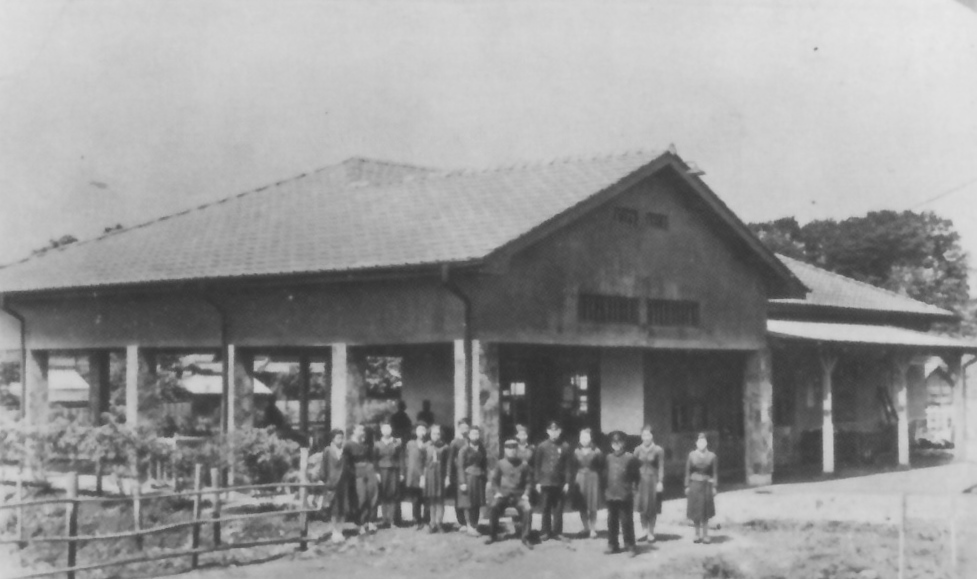
Niikura Station circa 1942

The station opened on February 1, 1934, as Niikura Station (にいくら駅) on the Tōjō Railway Line. Though originally written in hiragana, the station name was written in kanji (新倉駅) from July 21, 1934 onwards. On October 1, 1951, the station was renamed Yamato-machi Station (大和町駅). On December 20, 1970, it was renamed Wakōshi Station.

Fukutoshin Line services started on June 14, 2008.

From March 17, 2012, station numbering was introduced on the Tōbu Tōjō Line, with Wakōshi Station becoming "TJ-11".

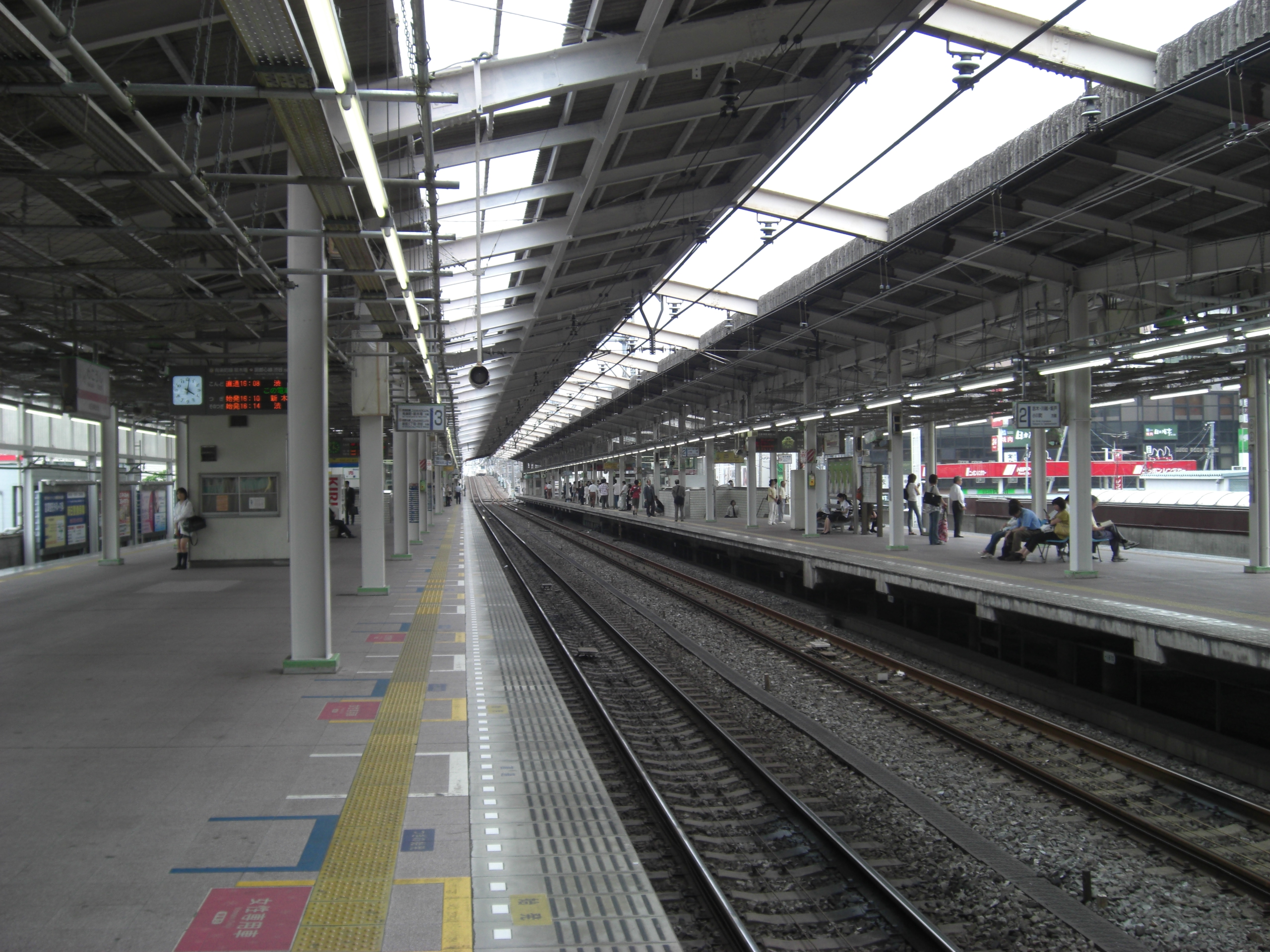
View of the platforms before the addition of platform screen doors, July 2008

Chest-height platform edge doors were added to platforms 2 and 3 in April 2012, with operation commencing in July 2012.

Through-running to and from Yokohama and Motomachi-Chukagai via the Tokyu Toyoko Line and Minatomirai Line commenced on 16 March 2013.

Effective the timetable revision on 18 March 2023, through services onto the Sagami Railway commenced courtesy of the Tokyu and Sotetsu Shin-yokohama Line. Most southbound services routing through Hiyoshi on the Tokyu Shin-yokohama Line continue as far south as Ebina Station on the Sōtetsu Main Line or Shōnandai Station on the Sōtetsu Izumino Line.

== Passenger statistics ==
In fiscal 2019, the Tōbu portion of the station was used by an average of 180,819 passengers daily. The Tokyo Metro portion of the station was used by an average of 192,132 passengers daily.

== Surrounding area ==
- RIKEN
- Japan Ground Self-Defense Force Asaka Base
- Honda Technical Research Institute
- National Tax College
- National Route 254 (Kawagoekaidō avenue)
- Nihonium road (city road 113)

== Bus services ==
The following long-distance express bus services operate from the south side of the station.

- Haneda Airport, operated by Airport Transport Service (Limousine Bus) and Seibu Bus
- Narita Airport, operated by Seibu Bus

== See also ==
- List of railway stations in Japan
