= Kotake-mukaihara Station =

Railway and metro station in Tokyo, Japan

SI37 Kotake-mukaihara Station 小竹向原駅

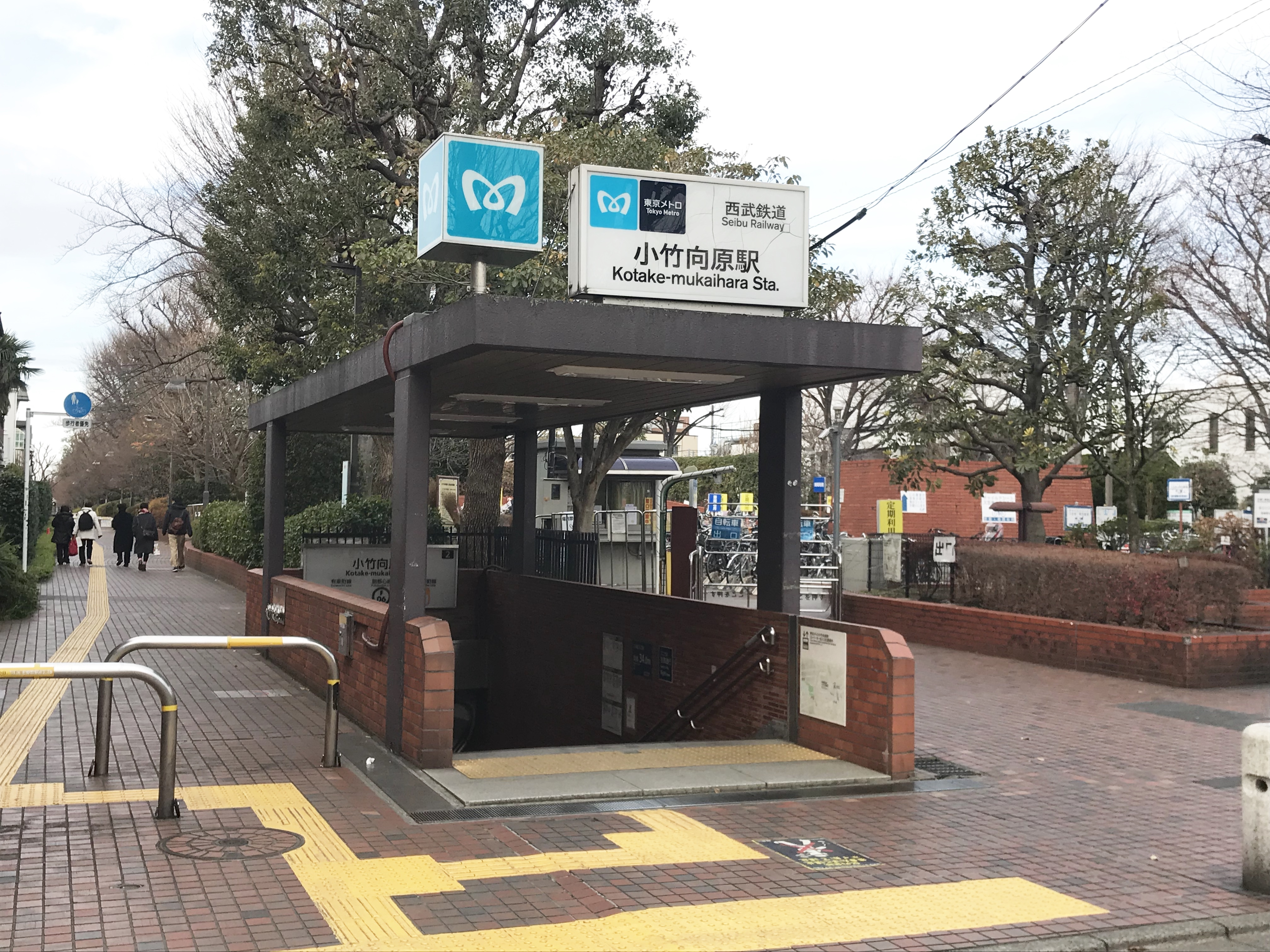
- Station entrance in 2019

General information
- Location: 2-16-15 Kotake-chō, Nerima-ku, Tokyo; Japan
- Coordinates: 35°44′38″N 139°40′43″E
- Operator: Tokyo Metro (manager); Seibu Railway
- Lines: Yūrakuchō Line; Fukutoshin Line; Seibu Yurakucho Line
- Platforms: 2 island platforms
- Tracks: 4

Construction
- Structure type: Underground

Other information
- Station code: F-06, Y-06, SI37

History
- Opened: 1 October 1983; 42 years ago

Passengers
- Tokyo Metro, FY2013: 154,779 daily

Services
Preceding station	Seibu Railway	Following station
Shin-Sakuradai SI38 towards Nerima	Seibu Yūrakuchō Line Rapid Semi Express Local	through to Tokyo Metro
Preceding station	Tokyo Metro	Following station
Hikawadai towards Wakoshi	Yūrakuchō Line	Senkawa towards Shin-kiba
Wakoshi towards Ogawamachi	F Liner	Ikebukuro towards Motomachi-Chūkagai
Nerima SI06 towards Hannō	F Liner	Ikebukuro towards Motomachi-Chūkagai
Wakoshi Terminus	Fukutoshin Line Express	Ikebukuro towards Shibuya
Hikawadai towards Wakoshi	Fukutoshin Line Commuter Express	Ikebukuro towards Shibuya
Hikawadai towards Wakoshi	Fukutoshin Line Local	Senkawa towards Shibuya
Location
- Location within Special wards of Tokyo Location within Tokyo Bay and Bōsō Peninsula Location within Tokyo Location within Japan

Kotake-mukaihara Station (小竹向原駅, Kotake-mukaihara-eki) is a subway station in Nerima, Tokyo, Japan, operated by Tokyo Metro. Its station numbers for the Tokyo Metro Yurakucho and Fukutoshin Lines are Y-06 and F-06 respectively. Its station number for the Seibu Yūrakuchō Line is SI37.

== Lines ==
Kotake-mukaihara Station is a junction of the following three underground lines.

- Tokyo Metro Yurakucho Line
- Tokyo Metro Fukutoshin Line
- Seibu Yurakucho Line

== Station layout ==
The station consists of two parallel island platforms serving four tracks. Both platforms are equipped with waist-height platform edge doors.

1,2
Yūrakuchō Line
for Nagatacho, Toyosu and Shin-kiba
Fukutoshin Line
- for Ikebukuro, Shinjuku-sanchōme, and Shibuya
- Tōyoko Line for Yokohama
- Minatomirai Line for Motomachi-Chukagai
- Sōtetsu Izumino Line for Shōnandai via Shin-yokohama Line
3
Seibu Yurakucho Line
for Nerima, Shakujii-koen, Tokorozawa, Kotesashi and Hannō
3,4
Yūrakuchō Line
for Wakoshi
Tobu Tojo Line for Shinrinkoen and Ogawamachi
Fukutoshin Line
for Wakoshi
Tobu Tojo Line for Shiki, Shinrinkoen and Ogawamachi

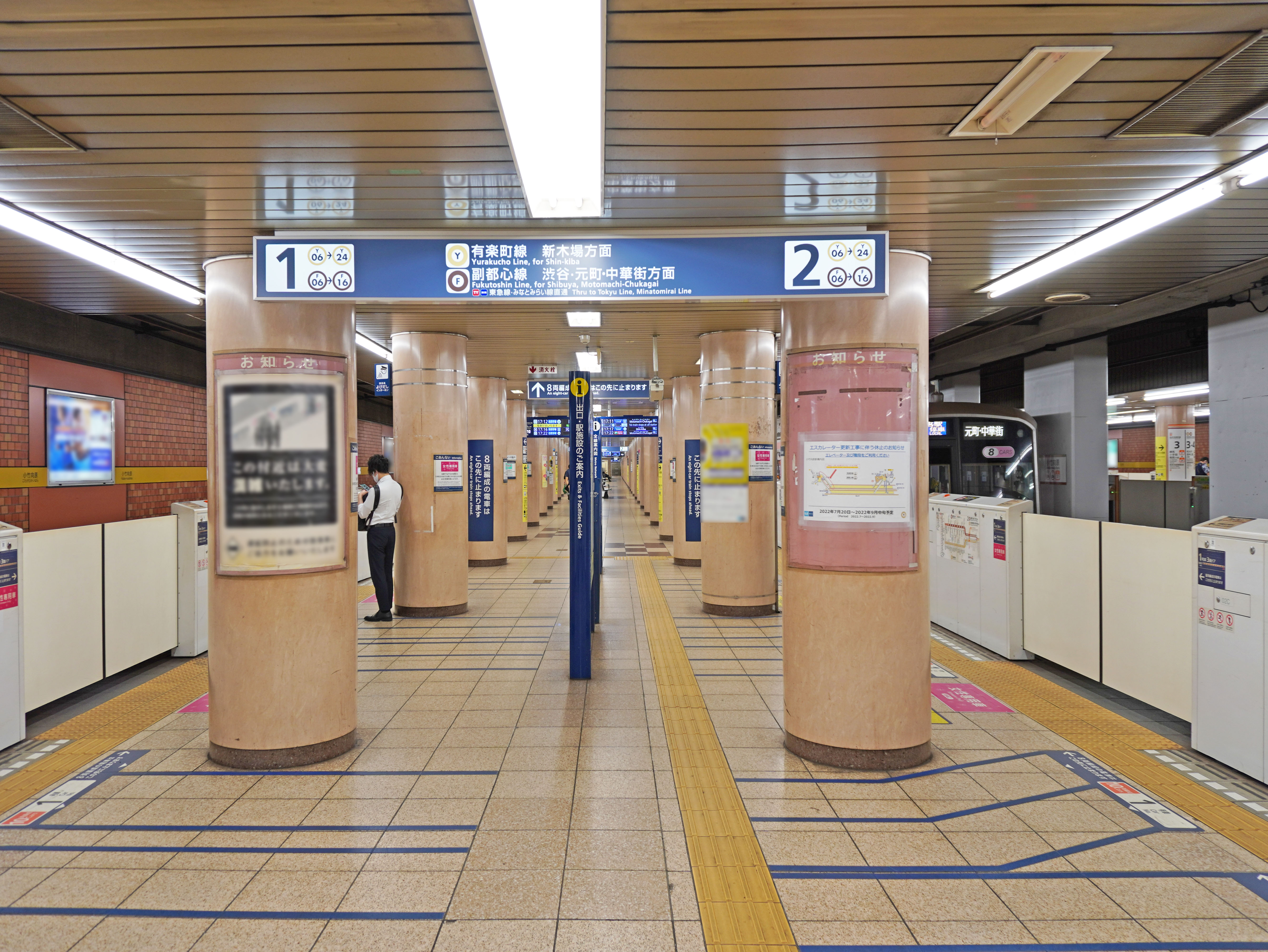
Kotake-Mukaihara Station platform 1 and 2

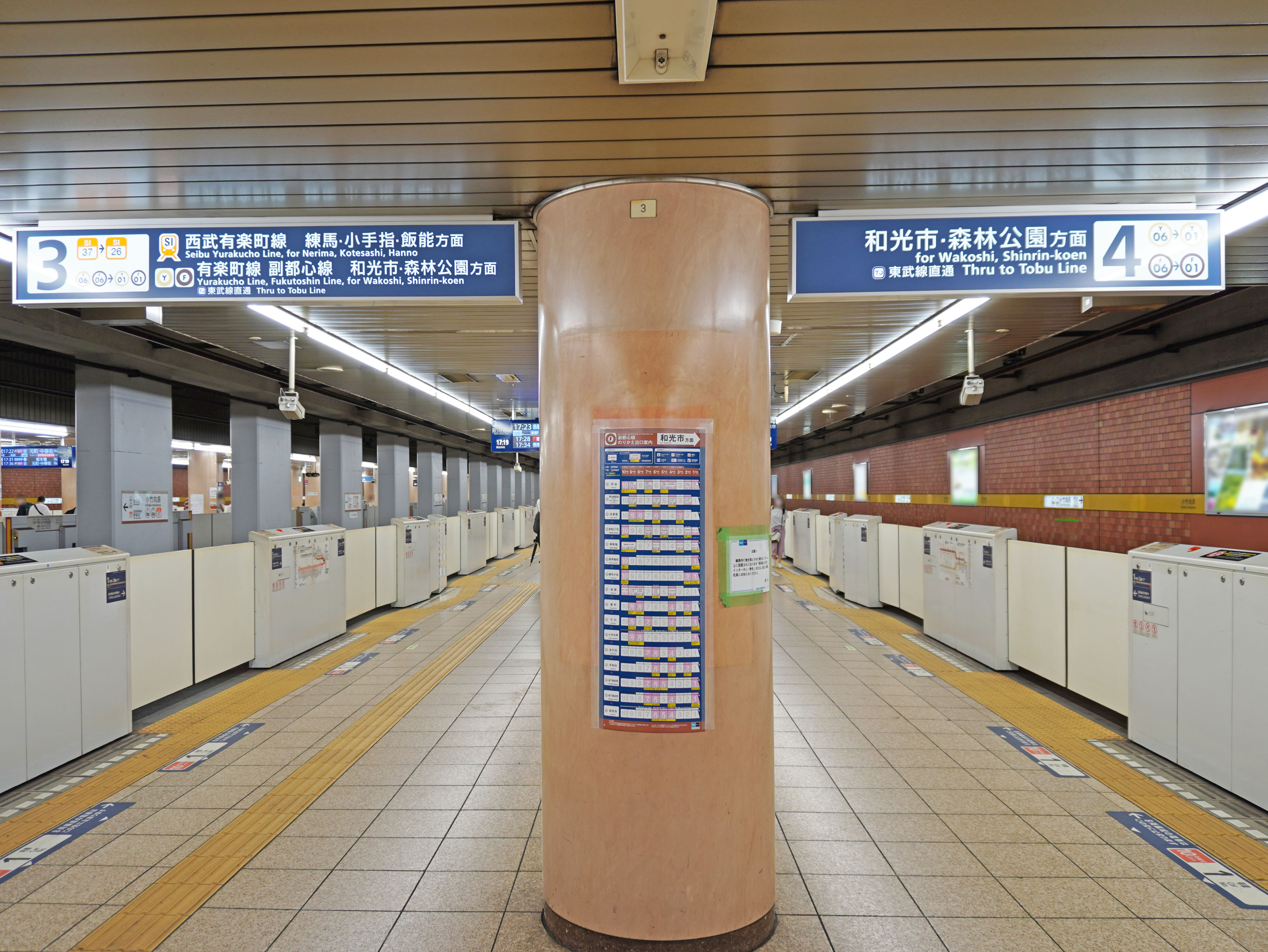
Kotake-Mukaihara Station platform 3 and 4

Track diagram

== History ==
The station opened on 1 October 1983.

The station facilities of the Yurakucho and Fukutoshin Lines were inherited by Tokyo Metro after the privatization of the Teito Rapid Transit Authority (TRTA) in 2004.

Waist-height platform edge doors were installed in June 2008.

Station numbering was introduced on all Seibu Railway lines during fiscal 2012, with Kotake-mukaihara Station becoming "SI37".

== Passenger statistics ==
In fiscal 2013, the Seibu station was the 5th busiest on the Seibu network with an average of 154,779 passengers daily. In fiscal 2013, the Tokyo Metro station was used by an average of 154,779 passengers per day. Note that the statistics consider passengers who travel through Kotake-mukaihara station on a through service as users of the station, even if they did not disembark at the station. The passenger figures for previous years are as shown below.

Fiscal year	Seibu	Tokyo Metro
2000	36,769	
2009	91,536	
2010	100,552	
2011	96,897	131,126
2012	104,207	139,446
2013	117,825	154,779

== Surrounding area ==
- Keiai Hospital
- Komone Library
- Tokyo Musashino Hospital

=== Schools ===
- Musashino Academia Musicae
- Toshima High School
- Asahigaoka Junior High School
- Kami-itabashi No. 2 Junior School
- Mukaihara Junior High School
- Kami-itabashi No. 2 Elementary School
- Kotake Elementary School
- Mukaihara Elementary School

== See also ==
- List of railway stations in Japan
