= F (disambiguation) =

F is the sixth letter of the Latin alphabet.

F may also refer to:

== Science and technology ==
=== Mathematics ===
- F or f, the number 15 in hexadecimal and higher positional systems
- _{p}F_{q}, the hypergeometric function
- F-distribution, a continuous probability distribution
  - F-test, a statistical test
- f, SI prefix femto, factor 10^{−15}
- F, Fibonacci number

=== Computing and engineering ===
- F (programming language), a subset of Fortran 95
- F Sharp (programming language), a functional and object-oriented language for the .NET platform
- F* (programming language), a dependently typed functional language for the .NET platform
- F-measure, the harmonic mean of precision and recall
- f, in programming languages often used to represent the floating point
- F connector, used for inlet in cable modems
- F crimp, a type of solderless electrical connection
- F band (NATO), a radio frequency band from 3 to 4 GHz
- F band (waveguide), a millimetre wave band from 90 to 140 GHz

=== Physics ===
- °F, degree on the Fahrenheit temperature scale
- F, for farad, a unit for electric capacitance
- F or ℱ, the Faraday constant
- f, focal length of a lens
  - f-number (sometimes called f-ratio, f-stop, or written f/), the focal length divided by the aperture diameter
- $\vec F$, F, F, force
- f, frequency
- F (or A), Helmholtz Free Energy
- F, the electromagnetic field tensor in electromagnetism
  Often generalized to include the field tensors of other interactions, as in i.e. the gluon field strength tensor.
- F region, part of the ionosphere

=== Chemistry ===
- Fluorine, symbol F, a chemical element
- f-block, a block of elements in the periodic table of elements
- F (or Phe), abbreviation for compound phenylalanine

=== Biology ===
- Form (botany)
- Form (zoology)
- Bioavailability, which is expressed as the letter "F" in medical chemistry equations
- Haplogroup F (Y-DNA), a patrilineal haplogroup
- Haplogroup F (mtDNA), a matrilineal haplogroup

== Music ==
- F (musical note)
- F major, a scale
- F minor, a scale
- F major chord, Chord names and symbols (popular music)
- f, Forte (music)
- F (album), an album by Japanese singer Masaharu Fukuyama
- F Album, an album by Japanese duo KinKi Kids
- "F", song on the double A-side single "Tsume Tsume Tsume/F" by Japanese metal band Maximum the Hormone

== Transport ==
- F Sixth Avenue Local, a rapid transit service of the New York City Subway
- F (S-train), trains on the ring line of Copenhagen's commuter train network
- F Market & Wharves, a heritage streetcar line operated by the San Francisco Municipal Railway
- Tokyo Metro Fukutoshin Line, a subway service operated by the Tokyo Metro, labeled
- The NYSE ticker symbol of the Ford Motor Company
- , the official West Japan Railway Company service symbol for the Osaka Higashi Line
- Ford F-Series, a series of full-size pickup trucks from Ford Motor Company
- Bogor, Cianjur and Sukabumi (vehicle registration prefix F)

== Military ==
- F, a class of designation in the United States military aircraft designation systems which stands for "Fighter"
- F, a common designation for fighter aircraft
- Foxtrot, the military time zone code for UTC+06:00
- F band (NATO), a radio frequency band from 3 to 4 GHz

== Other uses ==
- F (film), a 2010 film directed by Johannes Roberts
- France, on the vehicle registration plates of the European Union
- F (grade), a failing grade
- f, the symbol used in the International Phonetic Alphabet for the voiceless labiodental fricative
- f, common abbreviation in lexicons meaning feminine grammatical gender
- f., and the page following (in a citation)
- Fax, referring to a facsimile machine
- F, abbreviation for fax number
- The citation abbreviation of the Federal Reporter
- F, Fujitsu's mobile phones in Japan
- Forward position in Australian Rules football
- "F" or "F***", sometimes used to censor "fuck".
- f, abbreviation for the social networking service Facebook
- Common abbreviation for floor (for example, "3F" = 3rd floor)
- F word (disambiguation), euphemism for several words beginning with "f"
- Dominical letter F for a common year starting on Tuesday
- Press F to pay respects, as an online expression of respects to a recently deceased person (as a reference to the videogame Call of Duty: Advanced Warfare)
- F, the production code for the 1964 Doctor Who serial The Aztecs
- "F" Is for Fugitive, the sixth novel in Sue Grafton's "Alphabet mystery" series, published in 1989
- Nikon F-mount, an interchangeable lens mount developed by Nikon for its SLR and DSLR cameras
- Nikon F, Nikon's first SLR camera

== See also ==
- Class F (disambiguation)
- F class (disambiguation)
- F-sharp (disambiguation)
- F type (disambiguation)
