= F-class destroyer =

F-class destroyer may refer to:

- Tribal-class destroyer (1905), twelve ships for the Royal Navy that served in World War I
- F-class destroyer (1934), nine ships for the Royal Navy that served in World War II

== See also ==
- F class (disambiguation)
