= F-type =

F-type may refer to:

- F-type asteroid, a type of carbonaceous asteroid
- F-ATPase, a membrane protein
- F-type main-sequence star, a hydrogen-fusing star
- F-type Prisons, high-security prisons in Turkey
- MG F-type Magna, six-cylinder-engined car produced by the MG Car company from October 1931 to 1932
- Jaguar F-Type, a two-seat sports car manufactured by Jaguar Cars
- Renault F-Type engine, straight-4 automobile engine from Renault
- Empire F type coaster, a type of prefabricated coastal tanker built in the UK during the Second World War
- F connector, a commonly used connector for coaxial cable
- F type Adelaide tram

Type F may refer to:

- Type F AC power plugs and sockets
- the Avro Type F, an aircraft
- Type-F couplers in rail transport
- a Type F submarine
- the Handley Page Type F, an aircraft
- the Caudron Type F, a biplane
- the Deronda Type F, a performance car

== See also ==
- F class (disambiguation)
- B type (disambiguation)
- P-type (disambiguation)
