= Seibu 6000 series =

Electric multiple unit of Seibu Railway

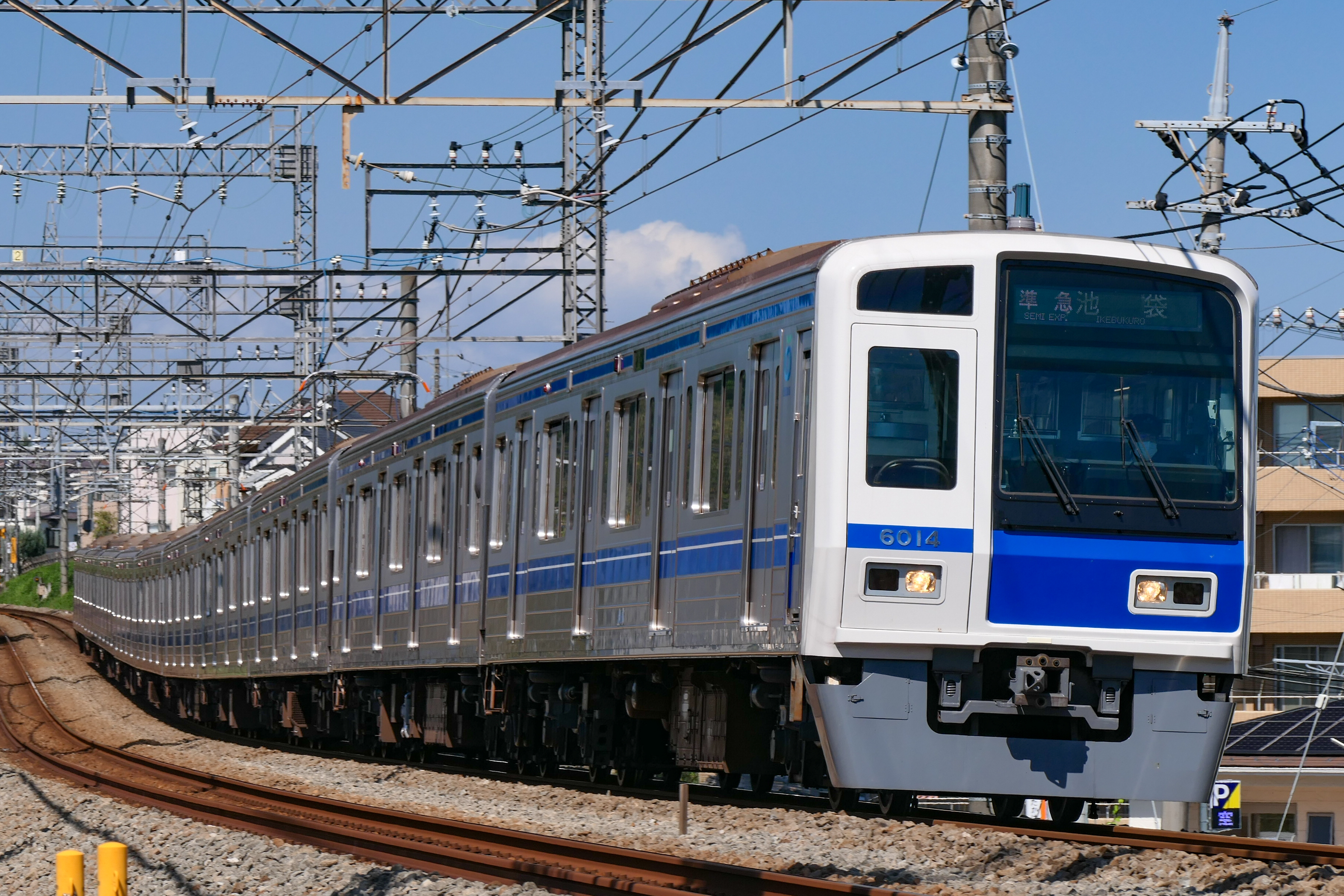
- Refurbished stainless steel set 6114 in October 2021
- In service: 1 June 1992 – present
- Manufacturer: Tokyu Car Corporation, Hitachi
- Constructed: 1992–1998
- Refurbished: 2006–2010
- Number built: 250 vehicles (25 sets)
- Number in service: 250 vehicles (25 sets)
- Formation: 10 cars per trainset
- Fleet numbers: 6101–6117, 6151–6158
- Operators: Seibu
- Depots: Kotesashi, Tamagawajosui
- Lines served: ■ Seibu Ikebukuro Line; ■ Seibu Yurakucho Line; ■ Seibu Sayama Line; ■ Seibu Shinjuku Line; ■ Seibu Haijima Line; ■ Tokyo Metro Yurakucho Line; ■ Tokyo Metro Fukutoshin Line; ■ Tokyu Toyoko Line; ■ Minatomirai Line

Specifications
- Car body construction: Stainless steel (6101 to 6117); Aluminium (6151 to 6158)
- Car length: 20,000 mm (65 ft 7 in)
- Width: 2,800 mm (9 ft 2 in)
- Doors: 4 pairs per side
- Maximum speed: 105 km/h (65 mph) (on Seibu Line); 110 km/h (68 mph) (on Tokyu line); 80 km/h (50 mph) (on Tokyo Metro lines)
- Traction system: Variable frequency (GTO/SiC/IGBT)
- Power output: 155 kW per motor (GTO); 170 kW per motor (SiC); 190kW per motor (6157)
- Acceleration: 3.3 km/(h⋅s) (2.1 mph/s) (on Tokyo Metro lines)
- Electric system(s): 1,500 V DC (overhead catenary)
- Current collector(s): Pantograph
- Bogies: Bolsterless
- Braking system(s): Electronically controlled pneumatic brakes with regenerative braking
- Safety system(s): New CS-ATC (beside 6101 and 6102), ATS (all sets)
- Track gauge: 1,067 mm (3 ft 6 in)

The Seibu 6000 series (西武6000系) is an electric multiple unit (EMU) train type operated by the private railway operator Seibu Railway on commuter services in the Tokyo area of Japan. Twenty-five 10-car sets were manufactured by Tokyu Car Corporation and Hitachi between 1992 and 1998.

Featuring several advances in design, accessibility, and technology over older Seibu Railway sets, the 6000 series was developed for use on through services to the TRTA (now Tokyo Metro) Yurakucho Line and to serve as the basis for future Seibu train types. The type first entered service on 1 June 1992 on the Seibu Ikebukuro Line and has since been introduced onto other lines, including the Seibu Yurakucho and Shinjuku lines, the Tokyo Metro Fukutoshin Line, and the Tokyu Toyoko Line.

== Design ==
The 6000 series was developed for use on through services to the Yurakucho Subway Line, as well as to be the basis for future Seibu Railway vehicles. The trains incorporate bolsterless bogies to reduce weight and complexity. Furthermore, the 6000 series fleet features variable-frequency drive (VVVF) traction systems. The all-over "lemon yellow" livery used with previous Seibu train types was discontinued in favour of bodyside blue and white accents.

Most of the fleet was constructed using unpainted stainless steel, with fibre-reinforced plastic used for the front ends; however, between 1996 and 1998, eight sets were constructed using aluminium bodywork throughout. This change in material resulted in a per-set weight reduction of 14.1 tonnes (13.9 long tons; 15.5 short tons) over older sets.

The interior is equipped with longitudinal seating throughout, with production sets being fitted with wheelchair spaces from new. All sets were built with LED passenger information displays above the doors; from 2008, these have been replaced with LCD displays.

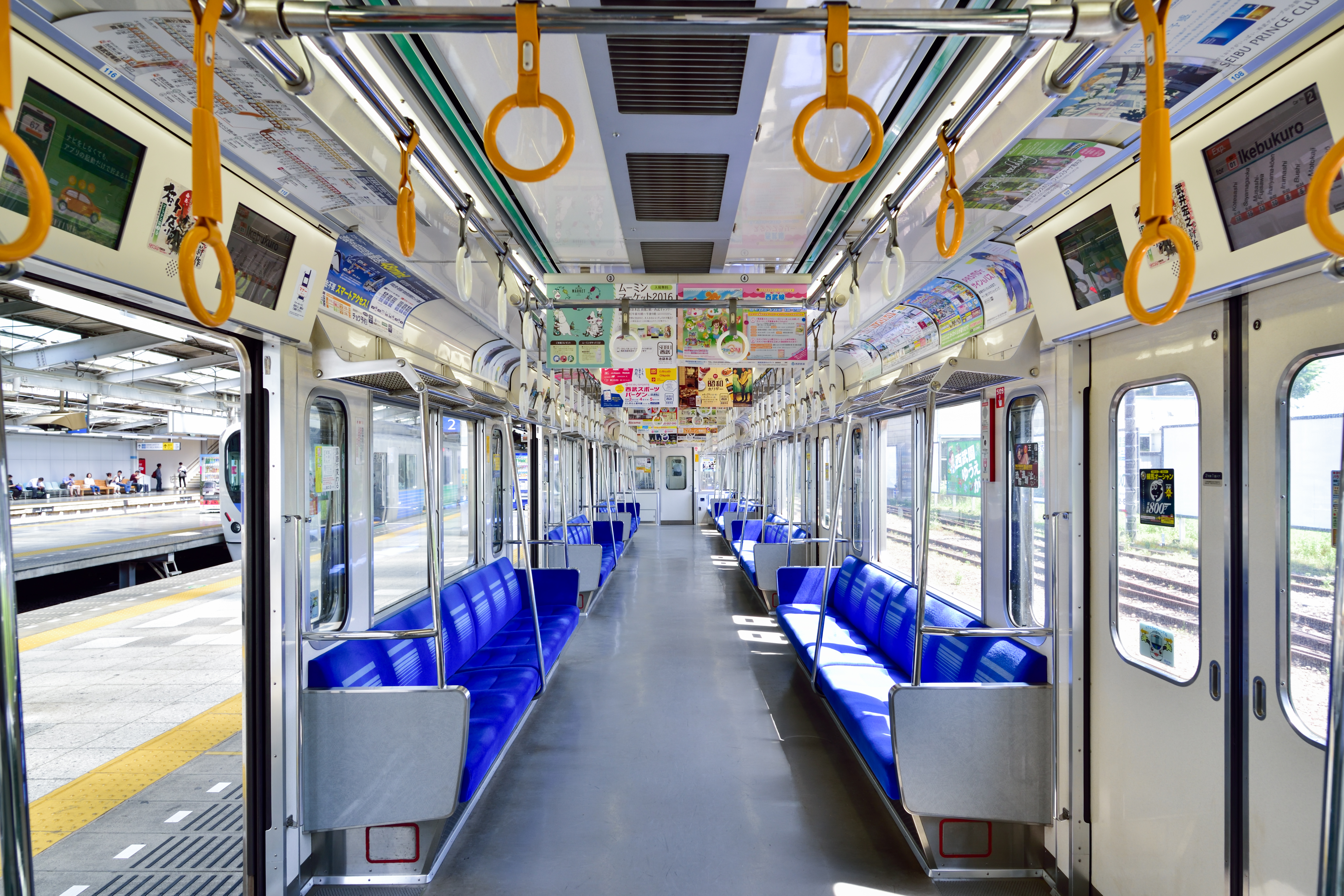
Refurbished interior of a stainless steel set

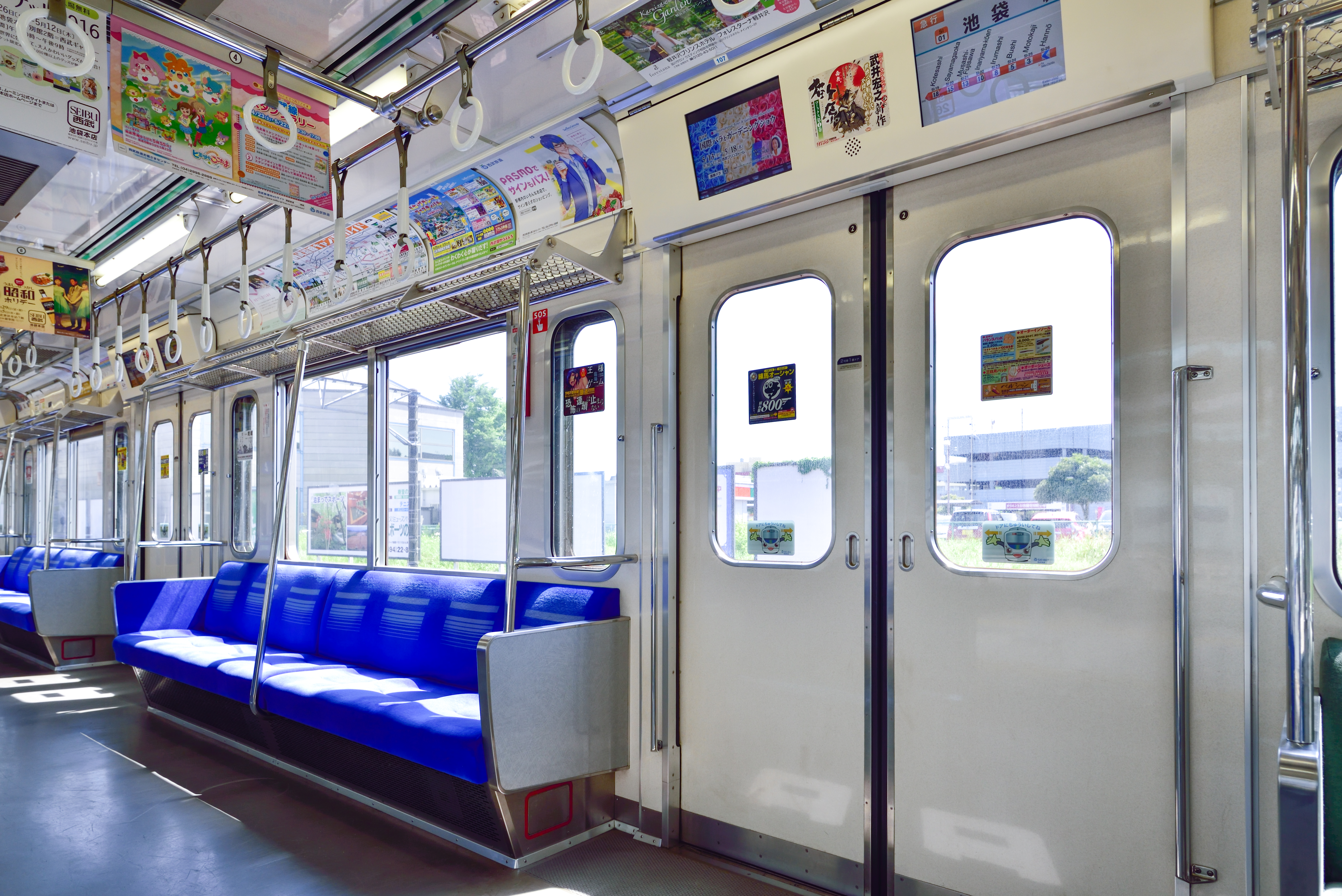
LCD screens of a refurbished trainset

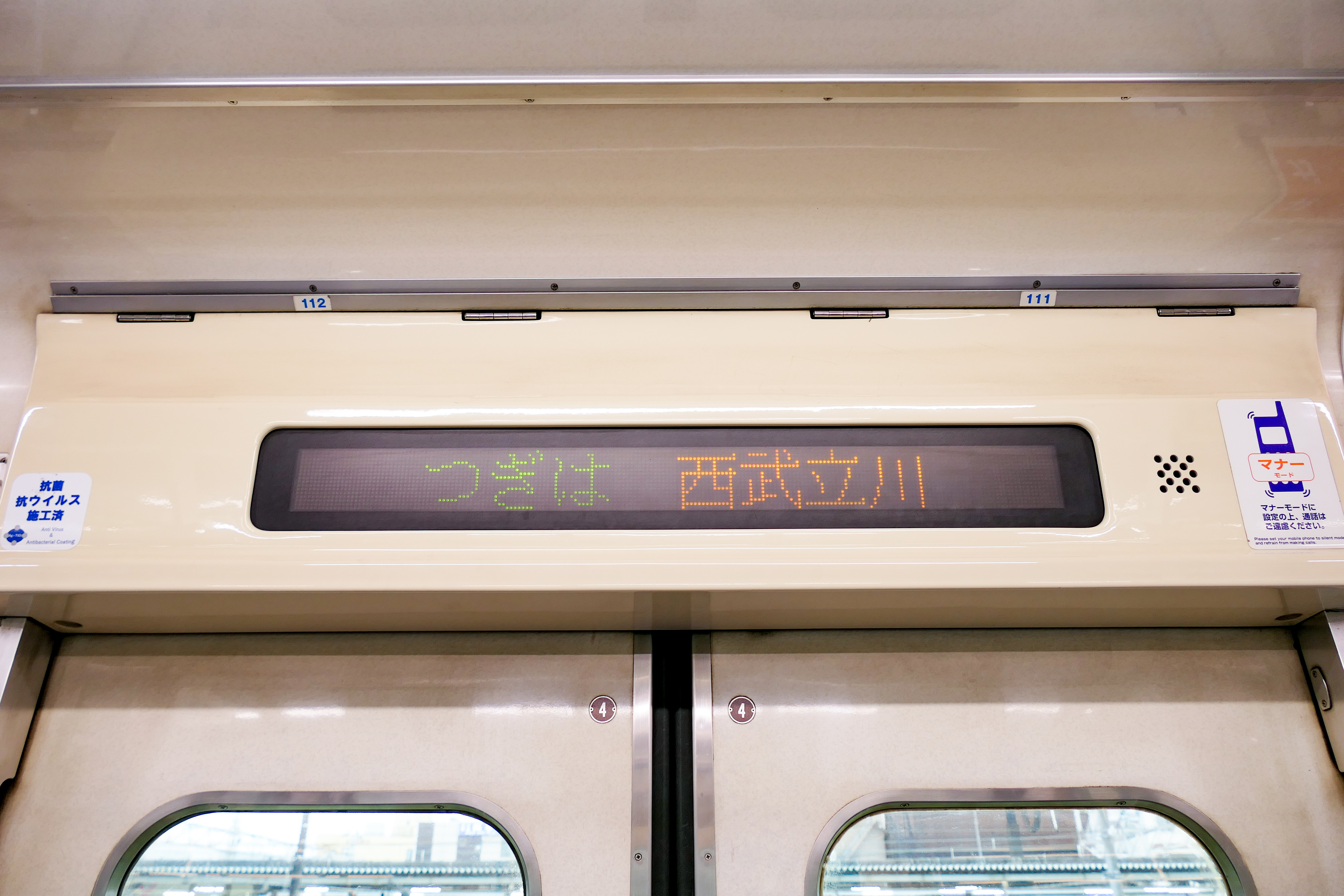
LED information display of an unrefurbished trainset

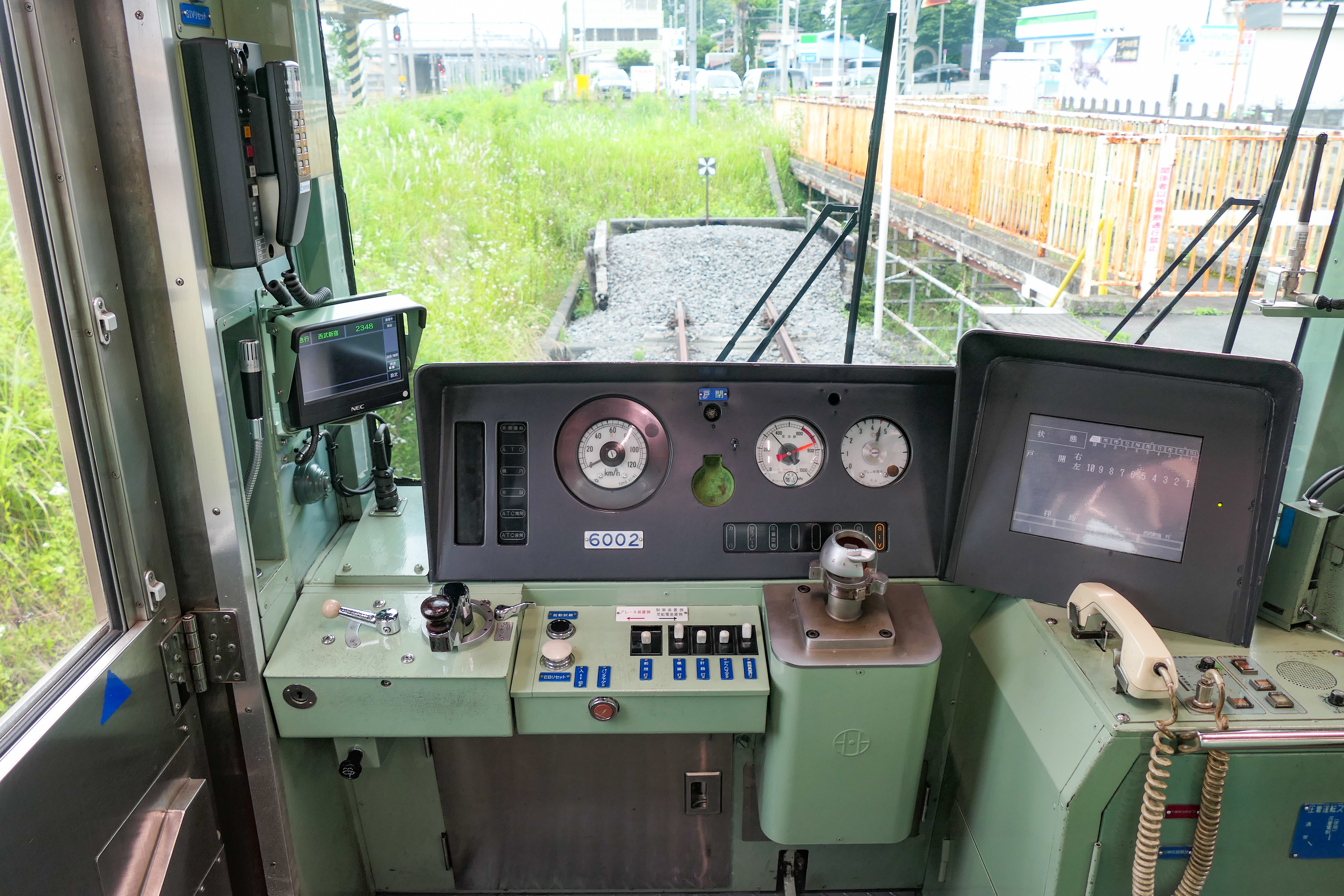
Driver's cab of an early-model 6000 series trainset

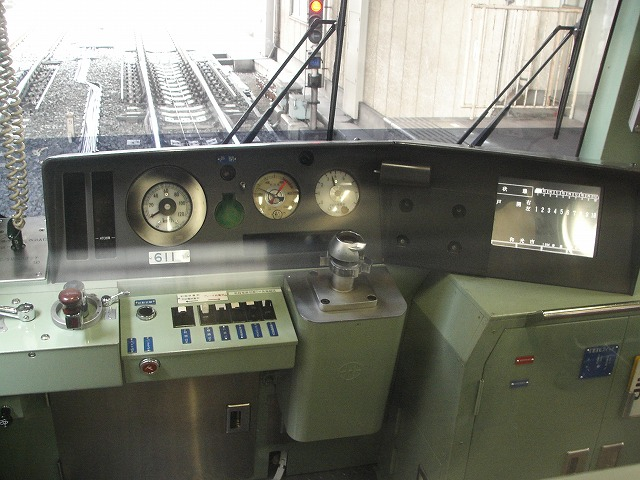
Driver's cab of a later-model 6000 series trainset, showing modifications made for improved visibility

== Variants ==
=== Batches 1–4 ===
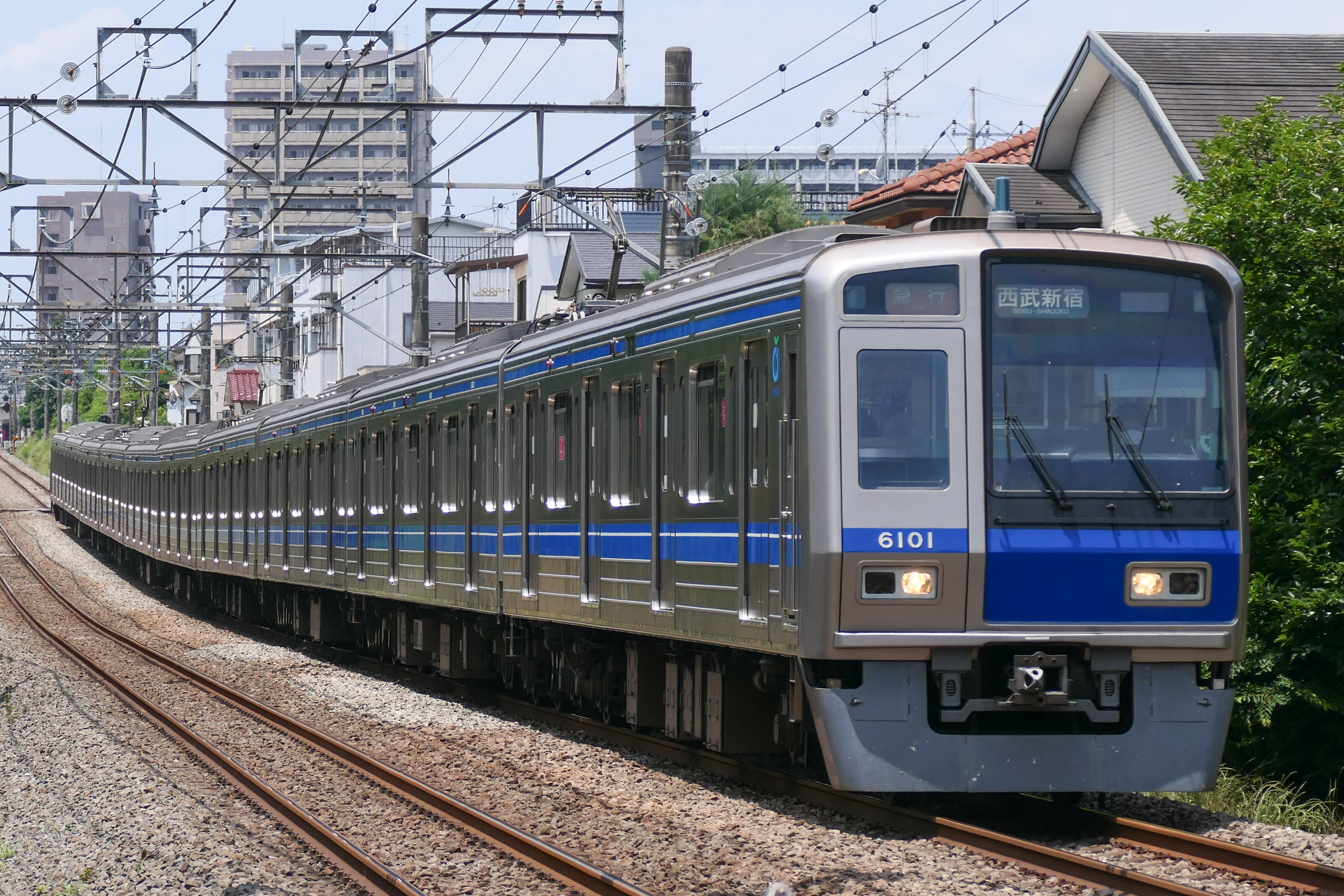
The first prototype set, 6101, in May 2021

The first 6000 series batch consists of two 10-car sets: 6101 and 6102. These were the first trains to use stainless steel bodywork in Seibu's fleet. The sets were built by Tokyu Car Corporation in 1992 and designated as prototypes. The "SS125" and "SS025" bogies are the first new bogie designs to be used by Seibu Railway since the "FS372" and "FS072" bogies, which were first introduced with the 101 series trainsets in 1969.

A batch of five production-ready 6000 series sets, numbered 6103 to 6107, first materialized in 1993, all of which were in service by 1994. For this batch, wheelchair spaces were installed in cars 2 and 9, and the openable side windows were replaced with fixed windows. Some portions of the driver's cab were modified to improve visibility. Since these sets were introduced, further design changes have been made, which are as follows.

- Batch 3 (sets 6108–6112): This batch of sets was introduced in preparation for the opening of the "up" portion of the Seibu Yurakucho Line extension to Nerima Station. The first four sets were built with subway-compatible radio equipment, with the last of those four (set 6111) also being equipped with automatic train control (ATC). As set 6112 was initially deployed on Shinjuku Line services, it was not built with such equipment.
- Batch 4 (sets 6113–6117): This batch of sets was introduced in 1995. There were minimal design changes over the previous batch.

=== Batches 5–7 ===
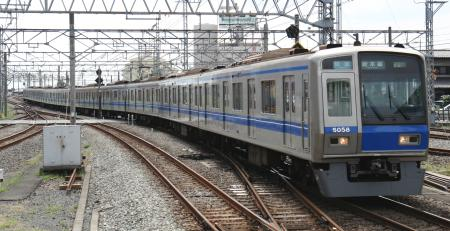
Aluminium-bodied set 6158 in September 2006

The fifth batch (sets 6151–6155) was manufactured from 1996. For this batch onward, aluminium was used for body construction. Additionally, Hitachi took over production of the 6000 series fleet; the manufacturer had previously supplied traction systems for earlier sets. These sets also feature a slightly altered bogie design over the ones used with the older sets.

Batches 6 (sets 6156 and 6157) and 7 (set 6158) were delivered between 1997 and September 1998, featuring slight design differences over the preceding batch. To reduce costs and weight, the door-pocket side windows and front-end passing lights were removed, and the bogie design was changed to incorporate a monolink system; the new bogies used in these sets were given the classifications "SS-150" for powered bogies, and "SS-050" for unpowered bogies. As of May 2022, all subsequent Seibu train types had incorporated monolink bogies, excluding the 001 series Laview trainsets.

== Formation ==
As of 1 April 2016, the fleet consists of 25 10-car sets (numbered 6101 to 6117 and 6151 to 6158), formed as follows.

Car No.	1	2	3	4	5	6	7	8	9	10
Designation	Tc1	M1	M2	T1	M3	M4	T2	M5	M6	Tc2
Numbering	6100	6200	6300	6400	6500	6600	6700	6800	6900	6000

Cars 2, 5, and 8 are each fitted with a lozenge-type pantograph. In 2018, sets 6101 and 6102 were retrofitted with single-arm pantographs.

== History ==
The 6000 series was introduced into service on the Seibu Ikebukuro Line on 1 June 1992, and on the Seibu Yurakucho Line in 1994 following the latter's expansion to Nerima Station. While the 6000 series was predominantly used on Ikebukuro Line services, some sets saw use on the Shinjuku Line network.

As more trains were required to cope with the increase in capacity brought on by the introduction of Ikebukuro Line and Yurakucho Subway Line through services, which commenced on 26 March 1998, some 6000 series trainsets were cascaded to the Ikebukuro Line and fitted with the equipment necessary for such operation. During this transitional period, sets that were unable to operate on the Yurakucho Subway Line received yellow "S" markers on their front-end skirts to distinguish them from subway-interoperable sets and to prevent them from accidentally entering the subway line. Some sets were initially adorned with green markers, but the colour used was eventually standardized to yellow.

=== Fukutoshin Line and Toyoko Line interoperation ===
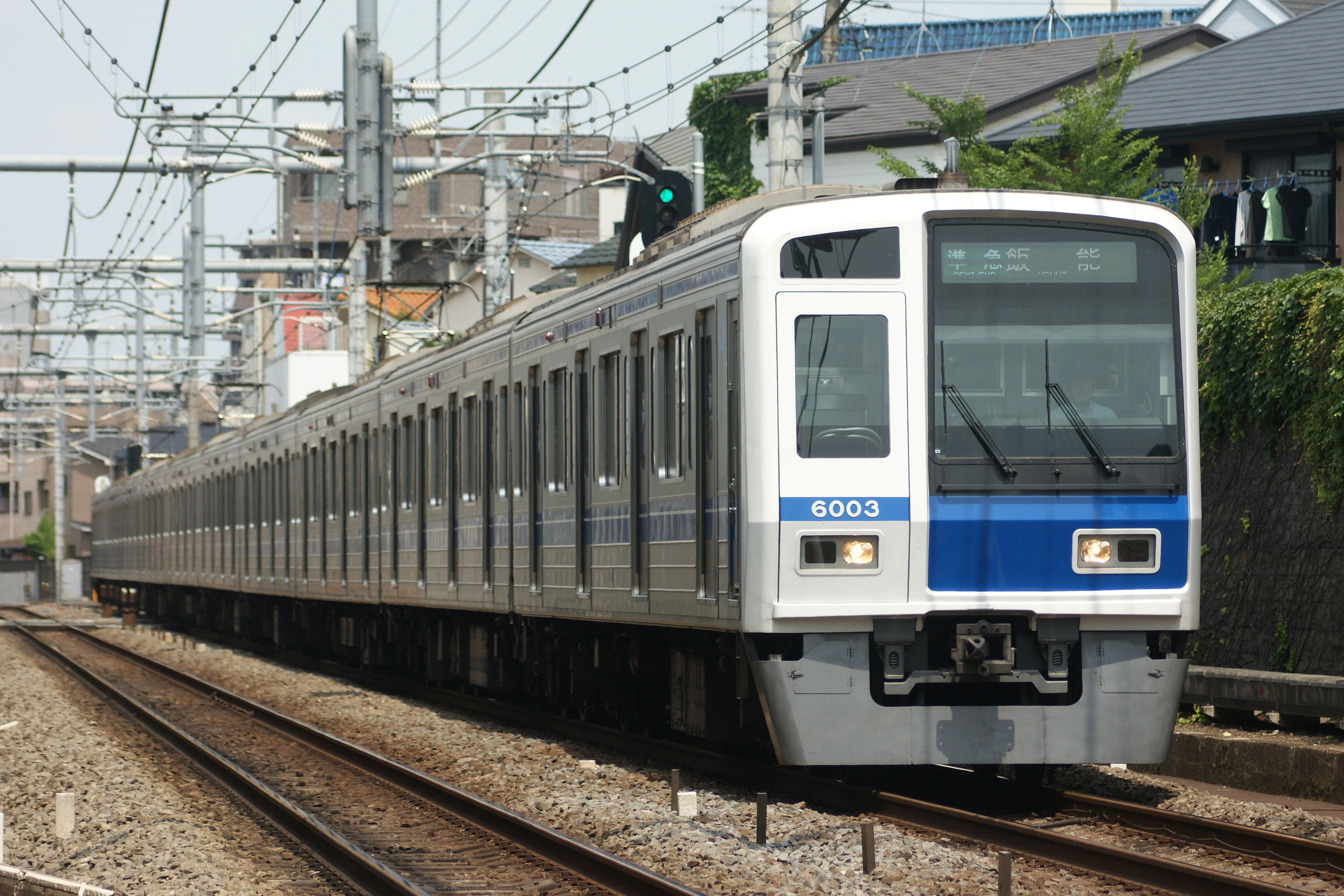
Refurbished stainless steel set 6103 in June 2008

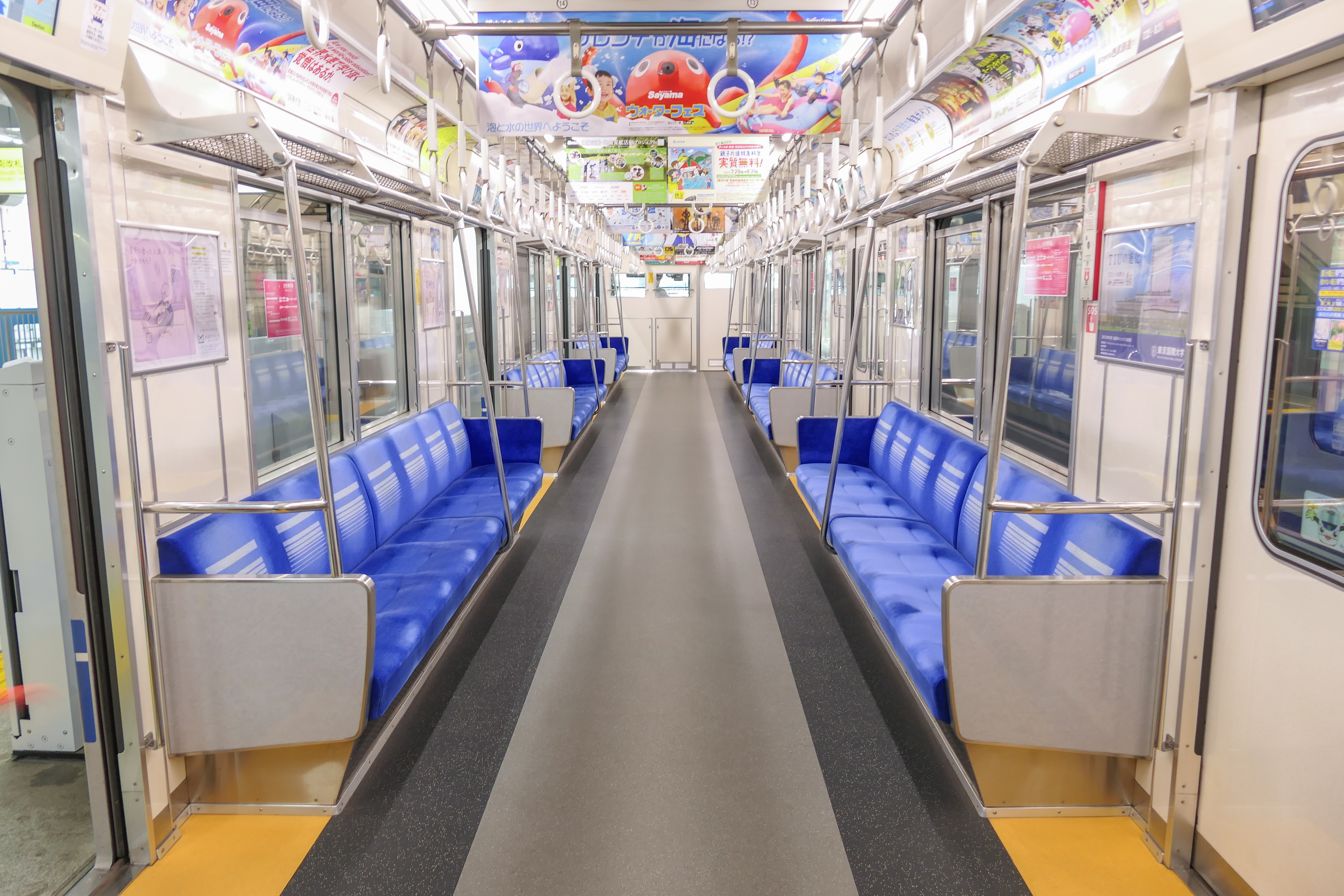
Interior of a refurbished aluminium set

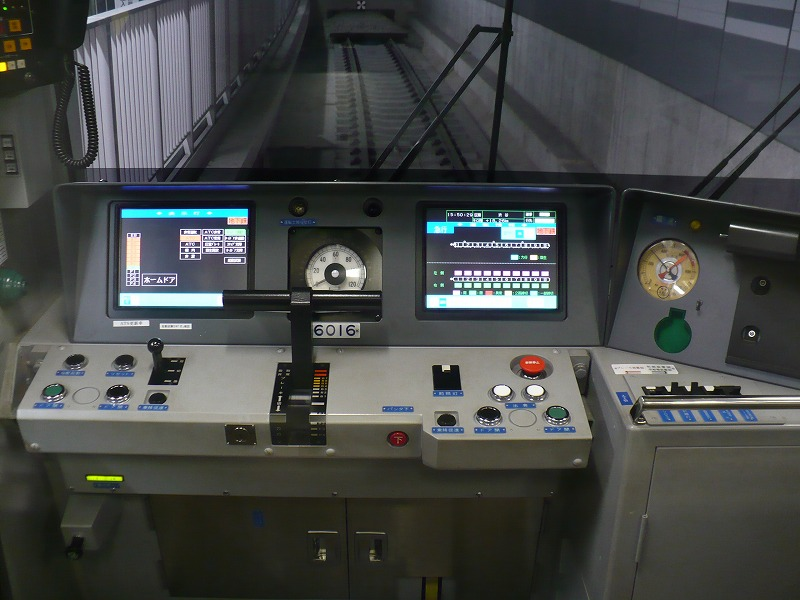
Driver's cab of a refurbished 6000 series set

Ahead of the introduction of Tokyo Metro Fukutoshin Line through services, twenty-three 6000 series sets were refurbished between 2006 and 2010. The work included the following:

- Replacement of roller-blind destination displays with full-colour LED destination displays
- Installation of external speakers
- White front ends (originally, they were silver)
- Remodeled driver's cab
  - Replacement of original two-handle control system replaced with combined power/brake single-handle control system
  - Replacement of original instrument panel to accommodate new train monitoring system
- Installation of ATC (former Shinjuku Line-allocated sets only) and automatic train operation (ATO) equipment

During the refurbishment period, unrefurbished 6000 series sets were affixed with "Y" stickers to indicate their incompatibility for Fukutoshin Line workings. Between 2008 and 2015, the original LED passenger information displays were replaced with pairs of 15-inch LCD displays.

Through services between the Ikebukuro Line and Fukutoshin Line commenced on 14 June 2008. On 16 March 2013, 6000 series trains were introduced on Tokyu Toyoko Line and Minatomirai Line through services via the Fukutoshin Line.

Beginning in 2023, new 40000 series sets partially displaced the 6000 series from Fukutoshin Line through services, with some stainless steel-bodied sets also being transferred to the Shinjuku Line. As of April 2024, all aluminium-bodied sets were withdrawn from these services. At the time, Seibu had no plans to transfer them to the Shinjuku Line.

== Special liveries ==
=== Ikebukuro Line 100th anniversary ===
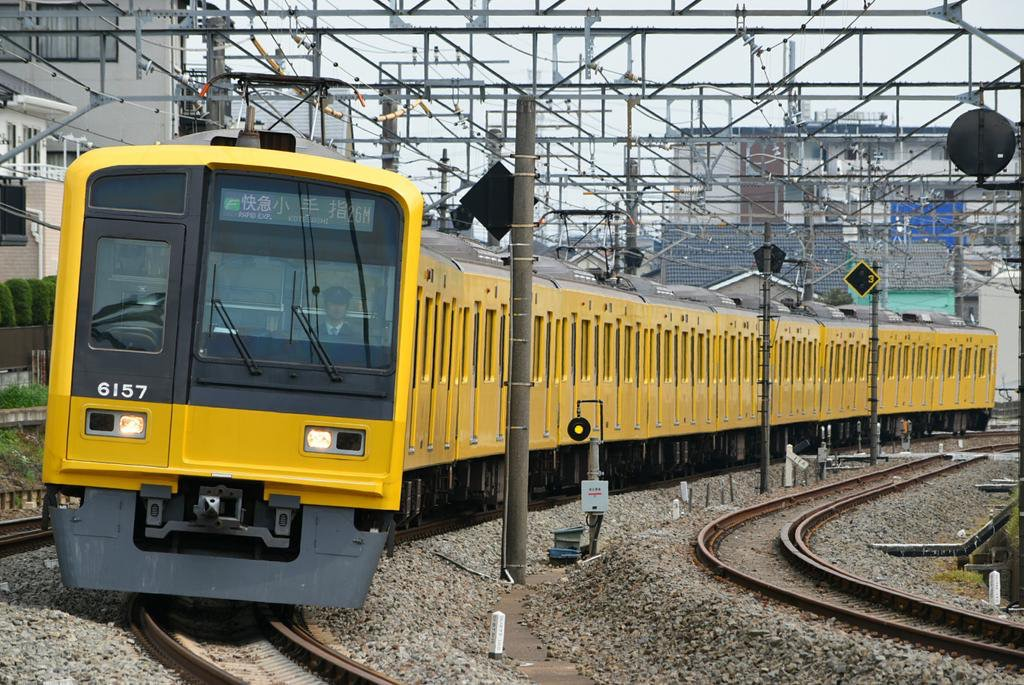
Set 6157 in March 2016

From 18 April 2015, set 6157 was returned to service in a special all-over yellow livery to mark the 100th anniversary of the Seibu Ikebukuro Line. It carried this livery until April 2016.

=== Seibu Yurakucho Line 40th anniversary ===
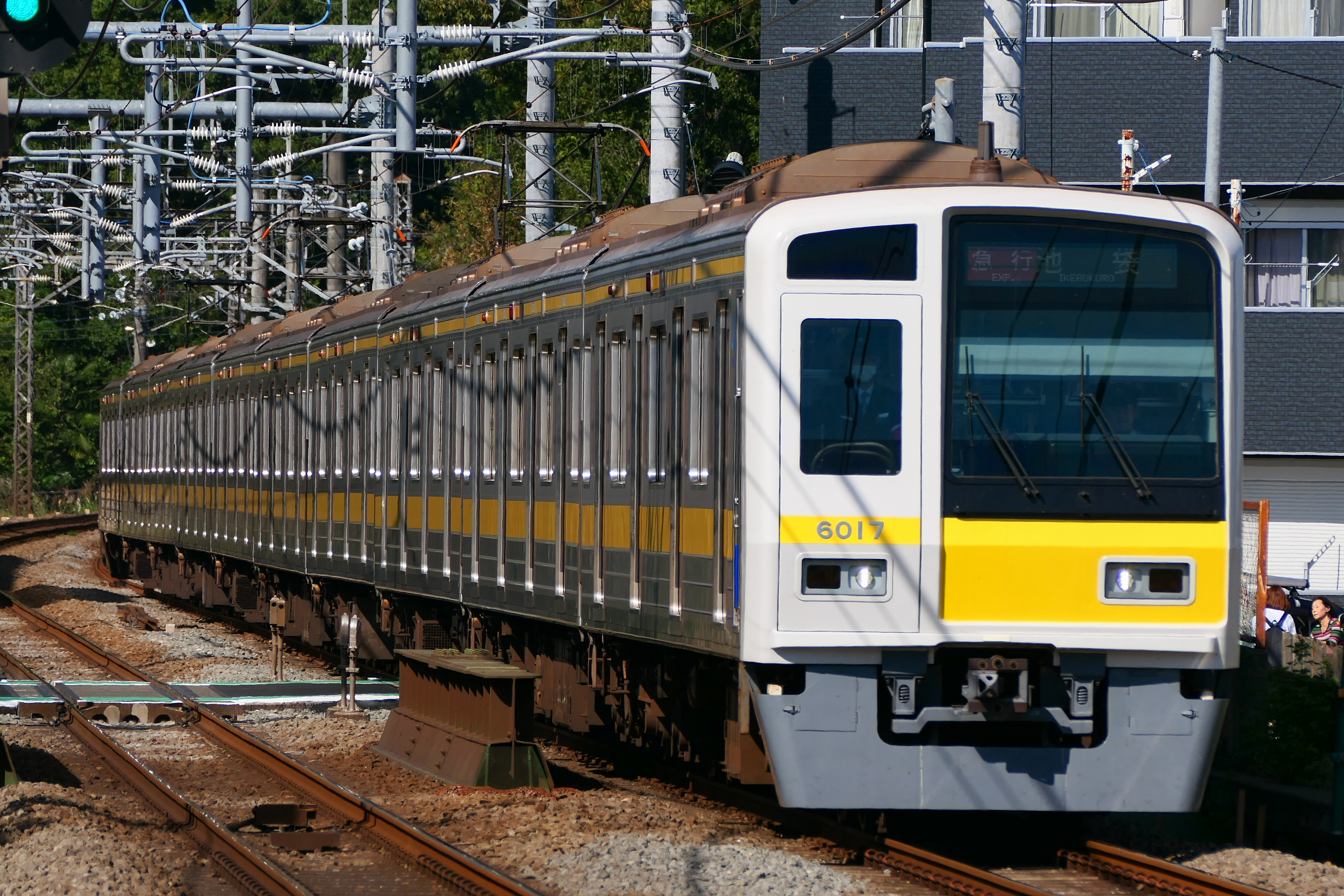
Set 6117 in October 2023

From 1 October 2023, to commemorate the 40th anniversary of the Seibu Yurakucho Line, set 6117 returned to service in a yellow-accented livery inspired by the original Tokyo Metro 7000 series livery. It was scheduled to carry this livery for approximately one year.
