= Class F =

Class F or F class may refer to:

- Class F, a stellar classification
- Class F, a type of race car sometimes referred to as F-P as well, for F-Production
- Class F, an airspace class defined by the ICAO
- Class F, a designation for model aircraft defined by the Fédération Aéronautique Internationale
- F Class or CIÉ 501 Class, a narrow gauge diesel locomotive used on the former West Clare Railway in Ireland
- F-Class (shooting sport), a high power rifle discipline
- F-class escort ship, ships used by the Kriegsmarine during the Second World War
- F-class destroyer (disambiguation), several classes of ships
- F-class submarine (disambiguation), several classes of submarines
- F-class Melbourne tram
- F-class Sydney tram
- Class F cable, a telecommunications cable
- Class F, a class used for fire extinguishers
- Class F fly ash
- F-segment, a European vehicle size class
- F class, code used by some airlines for first class
- Commonwealth Railways F class, 2-6-0 steam locomotives
- Metropolitan Railway F Class, British steam locomotives
- MRWA F class, Australian diesel locomotives
- NBR F class, British steam locomotives
- NZR F class, steam locomotives used in New Zealand
- South Australian Railways F class (1869), 4-4-0T steam locomotives
- South Australian Railways F class (1902), 4-6-2T steam locomotives
- Tasmanian Government Railways F class, 2-6-0 steam locomotives
- Victorian Railways F class (1874), 2-4-0 steam locomotives
- Victorian Railways F class (diesel), diesel-electric locomotives
- WAGR F class, 4-8-0 steam locomotives

== See also ==
- F type (disambiguation)
