= Kita-sando Station =

Metro station in Tokyo, Japan

Coordinates: 35°40′43″N 139°42′19″E

Kita-sando Station 北参道駅

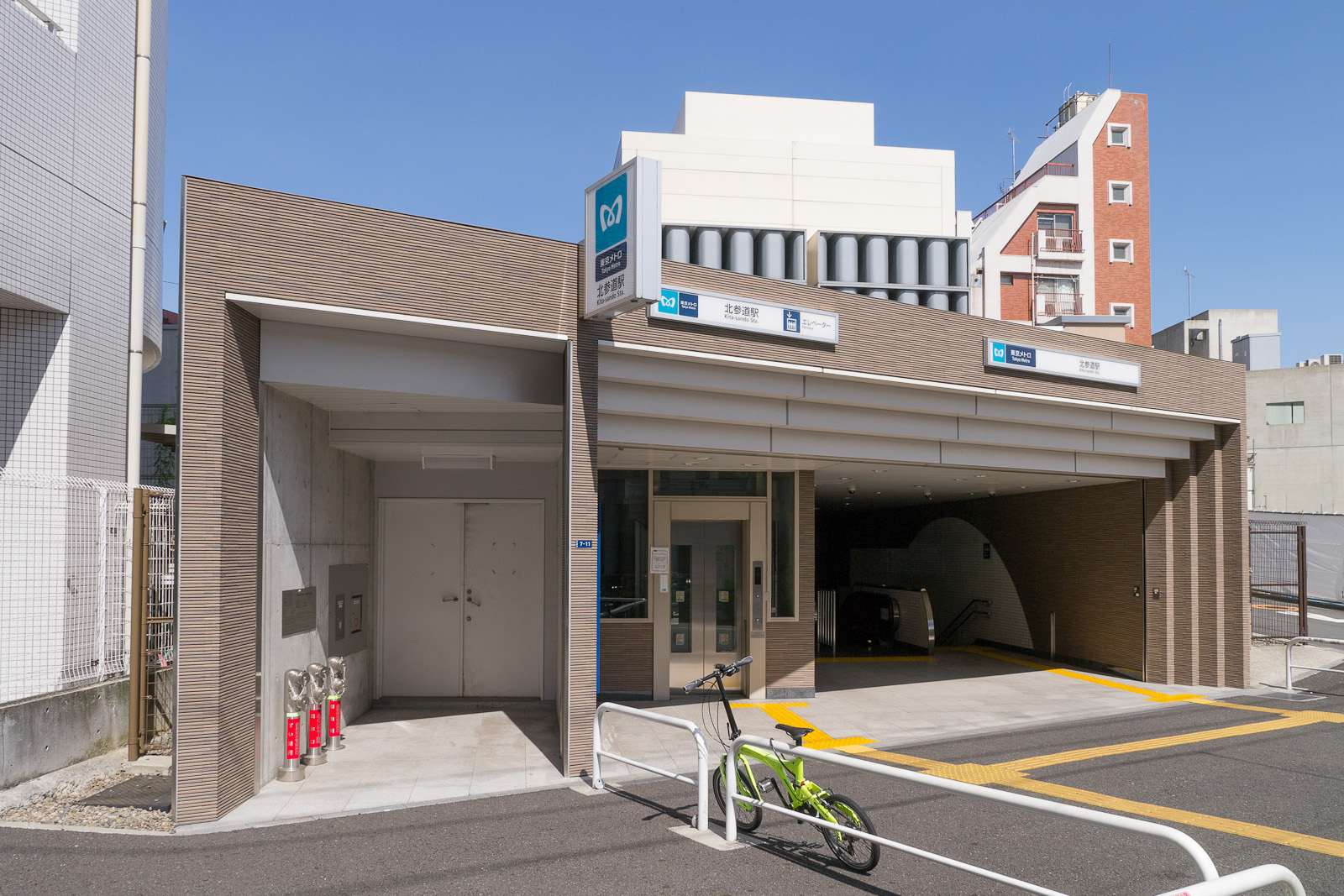
- Kita-sando Station

Japanese name
- Shinjitai: 北参道駅
- Kyūjitai: 北參道驛
- Hiragana: きたさんどうえき

General information
- Location: 4-7-11 Sendagaya, Shibuya City, Tokyo; Japan
- Operator: Tokyo Metro
- Line: Fukutoshin Line
- Platforms: 1 island platform
- Tracks: 2

Construction
- Structure type: Underground

Other information
- Station code: F-14

History
- Opened: 14 June 2008; 18 years ago

Passengers
- FY2013: 18,327 daily

Services
| Preceding station | Tokyo Metro | Following station |
|---|---|---|
| Meiji-jingumae towards Wakoshi | Fukutoshin Line Local | Shinjuku-sanchome towards Shibuya |
Location
- Location within Tokyo Yamanote Loop Location within Tokyo wards area Location within Japan

Kita-sando Station (北参道駅, Kita-sandō-eki) is a subway station on the Tokyo Metro Fukutoshin Line in Shibuya, Tokyo, Japan, operated by the Tokyo subway operator Tokyo Metro.

== Lines ==
Kita-sando Station is served by the Tokyo Metro Fukutoshin Line, and is numbered "F-14".

== Station layout ==
The station has a single island platform serving two tracks, located on the second basement ("B2F") level.

=== Platforms ===
| 1 | Fukutoshin Line | for Shibuya; Tokyu Toyoko Line for Yokohama; Minatomirai Line for Motomachi-Chukagai |
| 2 | Fukutoshin Line | for Ikebukuro, Wakōshi; Tobu Tojo Line for Shinrin-kōen; Seibu Ikebukuro Line for Hannō |

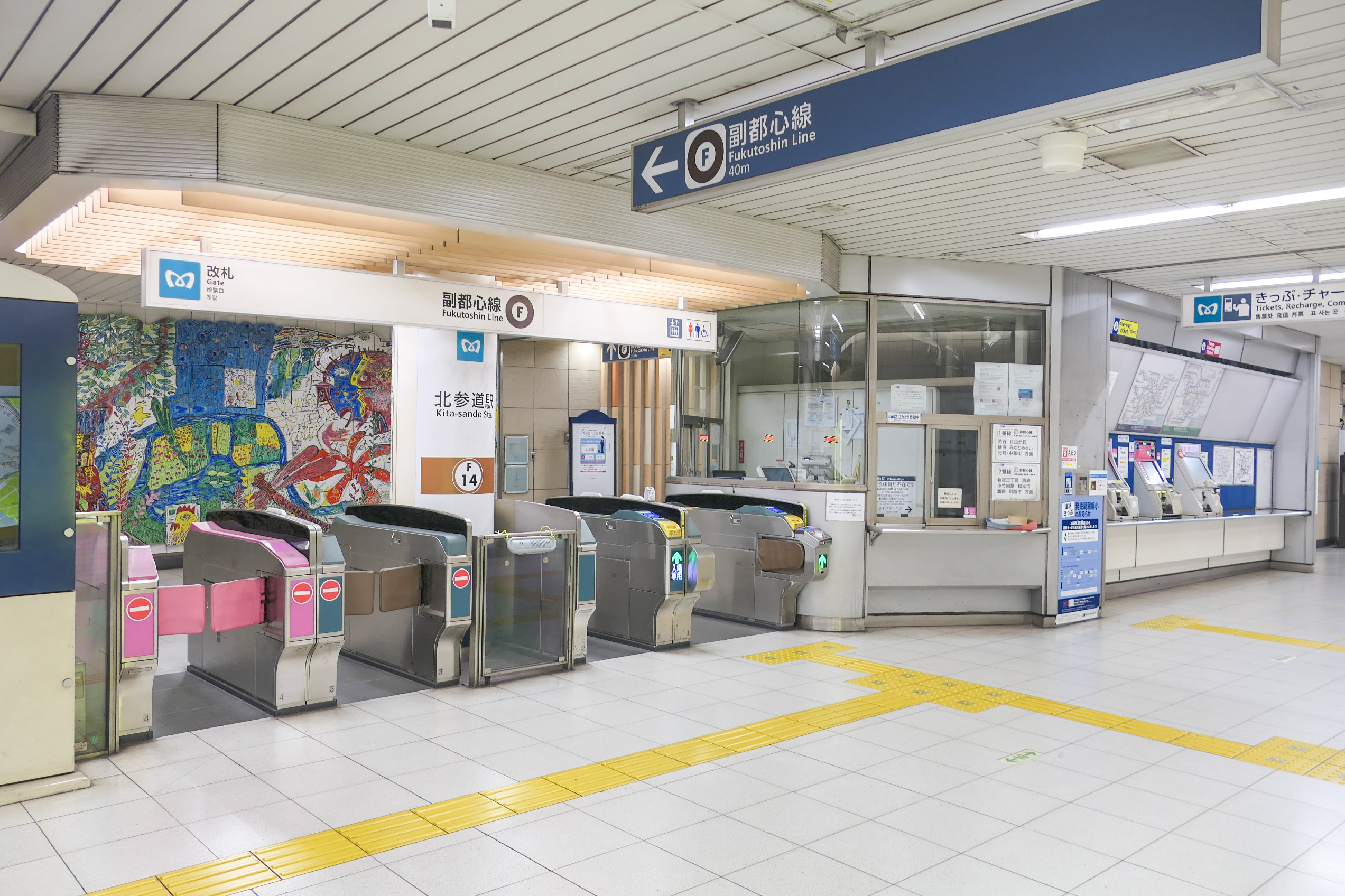
Ticket barriers (April 2026)

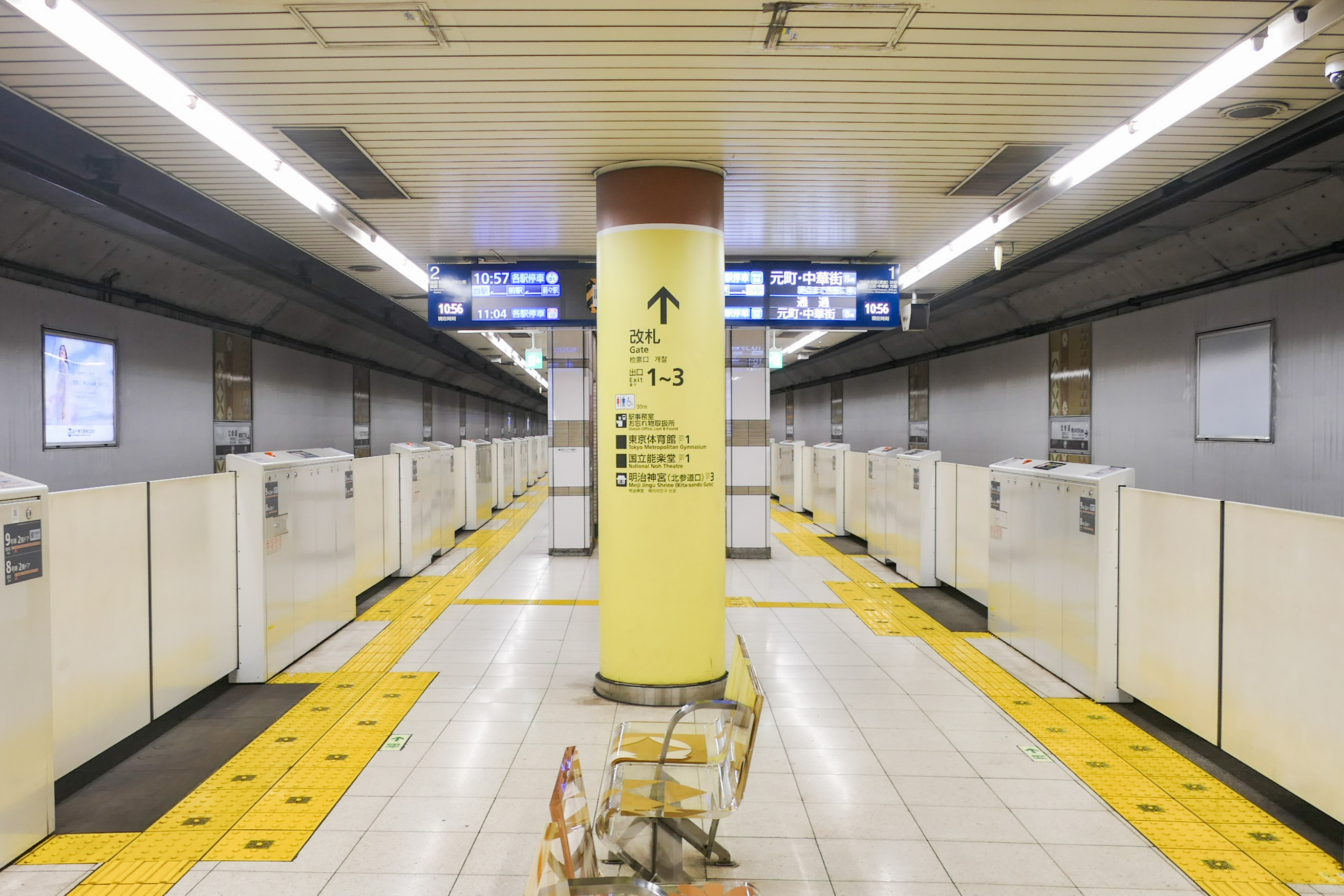
Platforms (May 2026)

== Passenger statistics ==
In fiscal 2013, the station was the 124th-busiest on the Tokyo Metro network with an average of 18,327 passengers daily. The passenger statistics for previous years are as shown below.

| Fiscal year | Daily average |
|---|---|
| 2011 | 13,183 |
| 2012 | 14,376 |
| 2013 | 18,327 |

== History ==
The station was opened on June 14, 2008.
