= Meiji-jingumae Station =

Metro station in Tokyo, Japan

Coordinates: 35°40′6.4164″N 139°42′19.2636″E

Meiji-jingumae 'Harajuku' Station 明治神宮前<原宿>駅

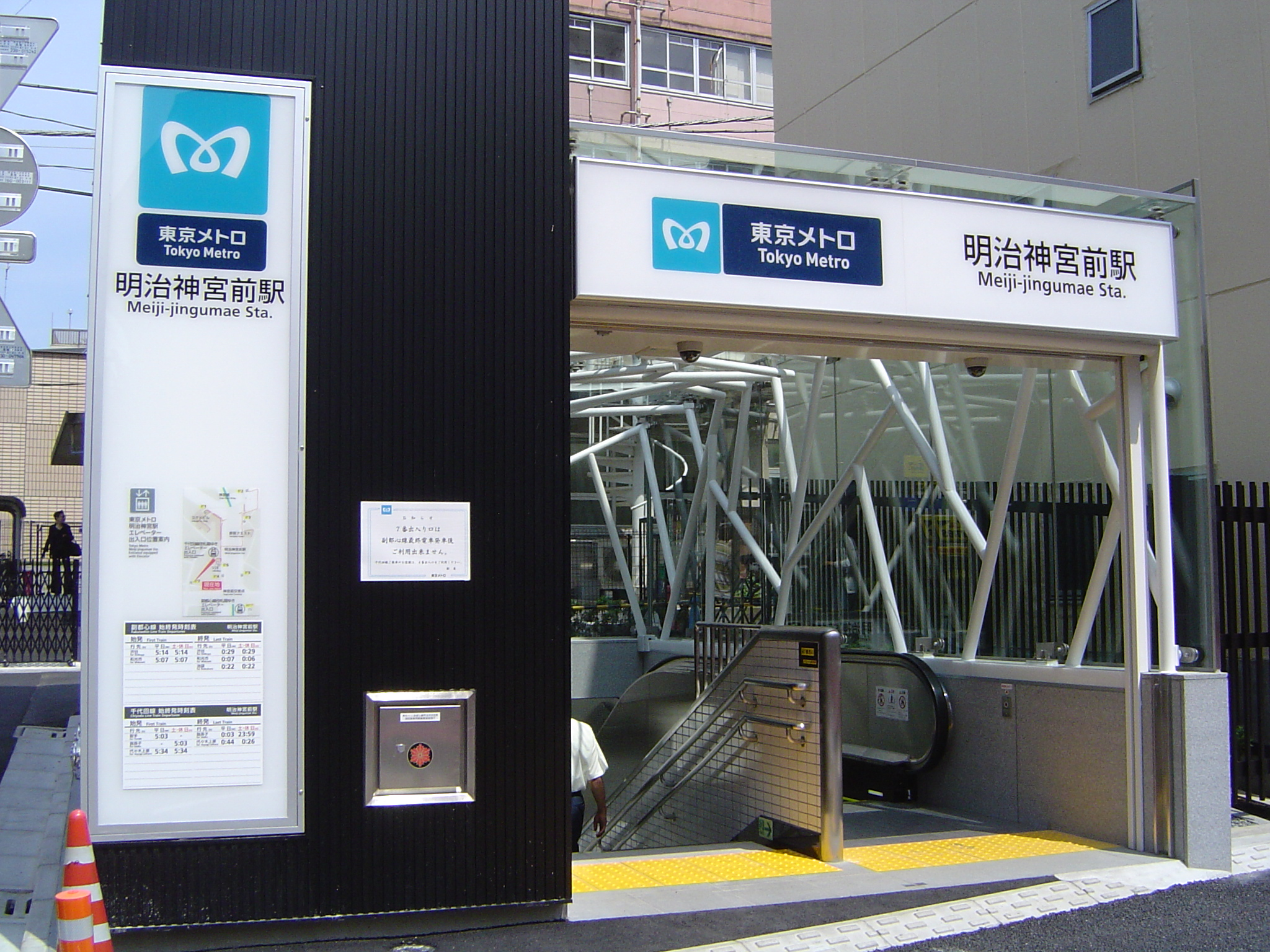
- Exit No. 7 of Meiji-jingumae Station

General information
- Location: Shibuya, Tokyo; Japan
- Operator: Tokyo Metro
- Lines: Chiyoda Line; Fukutoshin Line
- Platforms: 2 island platforms (1 for each line)
- Tracks: 4 (2 for each line)
- Connections: JY19 Harajuku Station; Bus stop

Construction
- Structure type: Underground

Other information
- Station code: C-03; F-15

History
- Opened: 20 October 1972; 53 years ago

Services
Preceding station	Tokyo Metro	Following station
Yoyogi-koen towards Yoyogi-Uehara	Chiyoda Line	Omote-sandō towards Kita-Ayase
Shibuya towards Motomachi-Chūkagai	F Liner	Shinjuku-sanchōme towards Hannō or Ogawamachi
Shibuya Terminus	Fukutoshin Line Express Commuter Express	Shinjuku-sanchōme towards Wakōshi
Shibuya Terminus	Fukutoshin Line Local	Kita-sando towards Wakōshi
Location
- Location within Tokyo Yamanote Loop Location within Tokyo wards area Location within Japan

Meiji-jingumae Station (明治神宮前駅, Meiji-Jingūmae-eki) is a subway station located in Shibuya, Tokyo, Japan. It is a part of the Tokyo Metro subway network, and is served by the Chiyoda Line and the Fukutoshin Line.

Harajuku Station on the Yamanote Line is immediately adjacent to Meiji-jingumae Station and is marked as an interchange on most route maps. Due to this proximity and to encourage use of the station by visitors, Tokyo Metro changed station signboards to read "Meiji-jingumae 'Harajuku' Station" (明治神宮前〈原宿〉駅) on 6 March 2010.

== Station layout ==
=== Platforms ===
1
Chiyoda Line
for Yoyogi-Uehara
Odakyū Odawara Line for Hon-Atsugi and Isehara
2
Chiyoda Line
for Ōtemachi, Kita-Senju, Ayase, and Kita-Ayase
Joban Line (Local) for Matsudo, Kashiwa and Toride (via Ayase)
3
Fukutoshin Line
- for Shibuya
- Tōyoko Line for Yokohama
- Minatomirai Line for Motomachi-Chūkagai
- Sōtetsu Izumino Line for Shōnandai via Shin-Yokohama Line
4
Fukutoshin Line
for Shinjuku-sanchōme, Ikebukuro, and Wakōshi
Tōbu Tōjō Line for Shinrin-kōen
Seibu Ikebukuro Line for Hannō

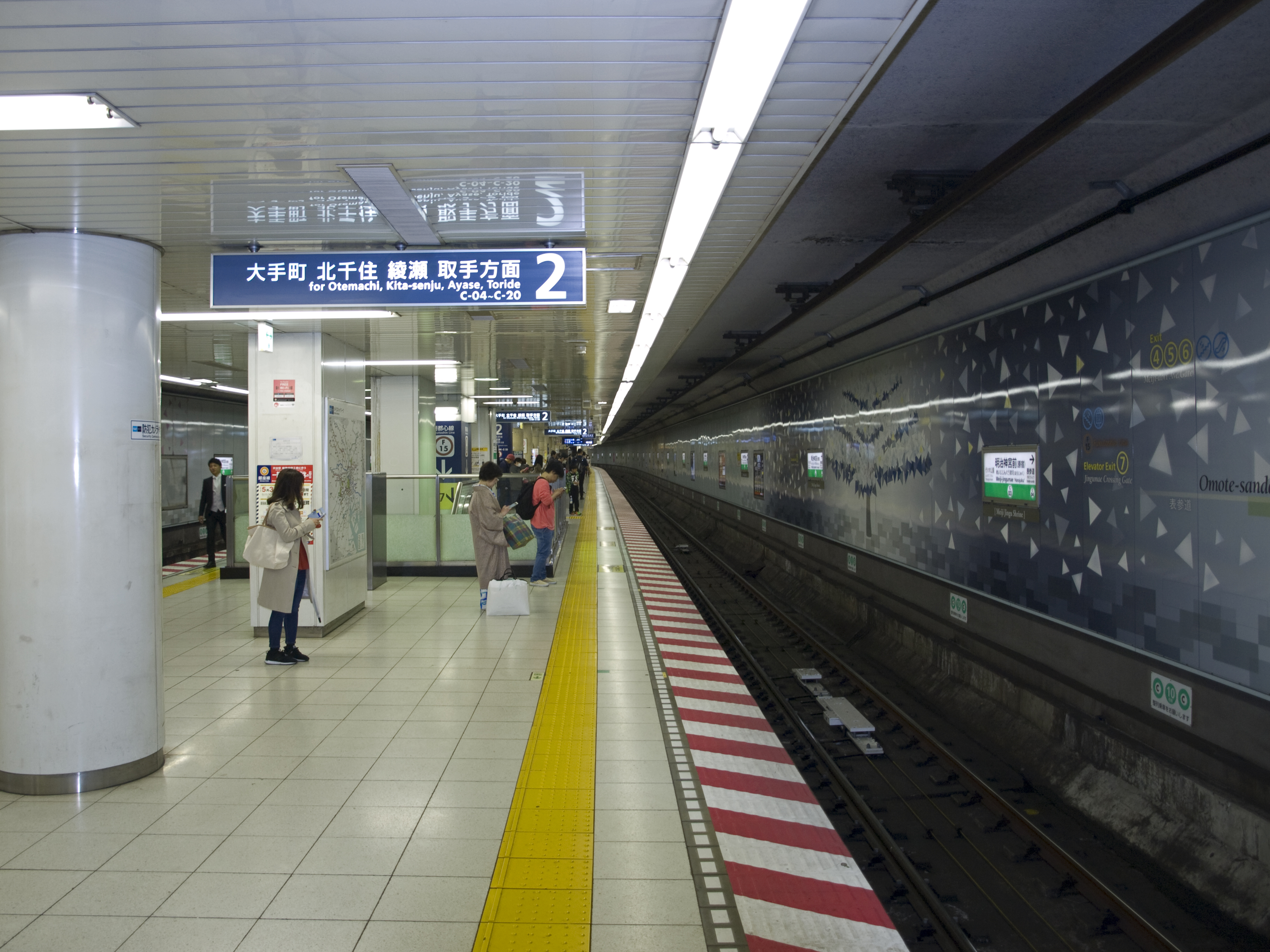
Chiyoda Line platforms, 2018

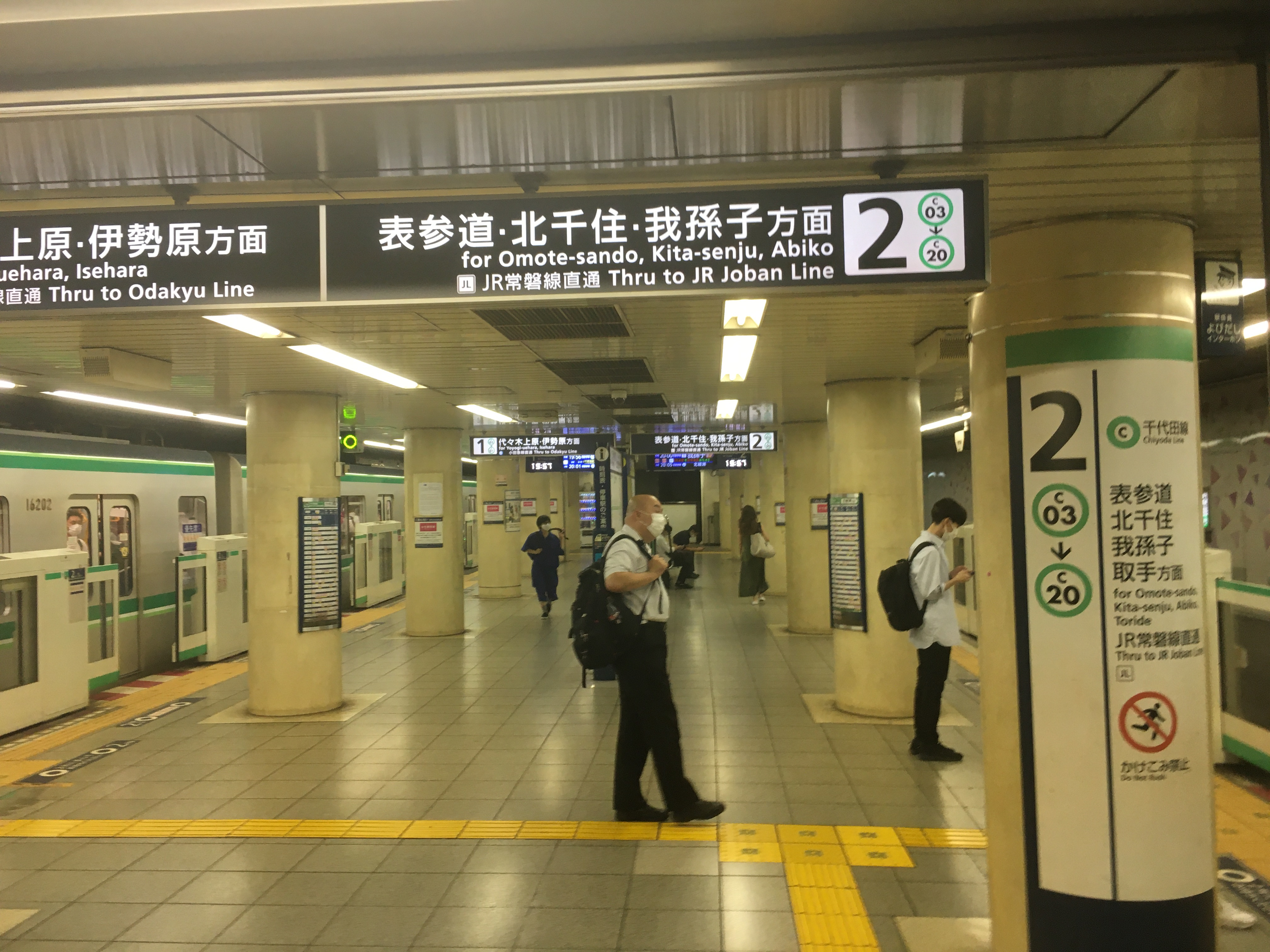
Chiyoda Line platforms, 2022

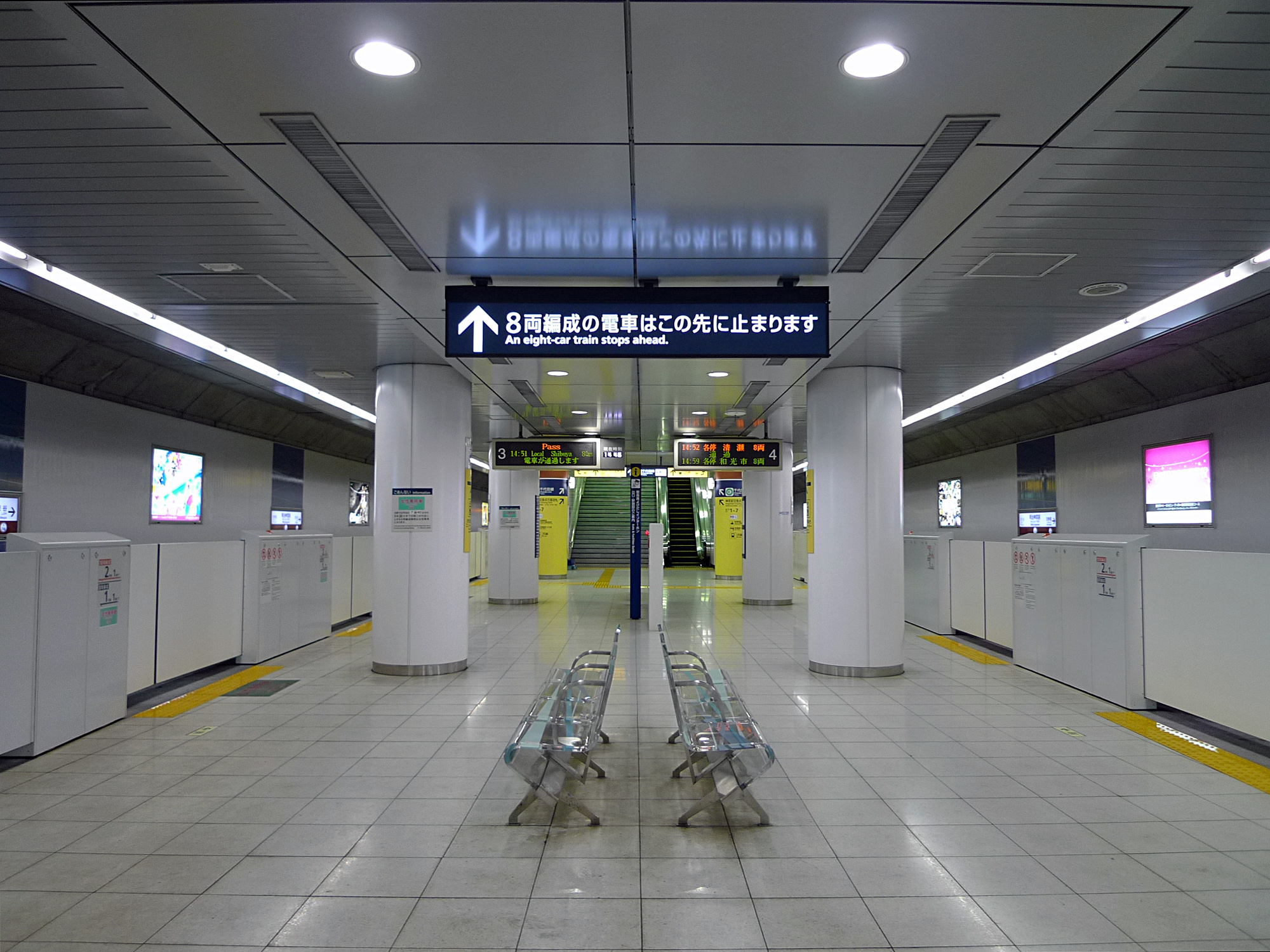
Fukutoshin Line platforms, 2009

== History ==
The Chiyoda Line station was opened on 20 October 1972 by the Teito Rapid Transit Authority (TRTA); the Fukutoshin Line station opened on 14 June 2008.

The station facilities were inherited by Tokyo Metro after the privatization of the TRTA in 2004.

PASMO smart card coverage at this station began operation on 18 March 2007.

== Surrounding area ==
Points of interest include:

- Meiji Shrine
- Harajuku
- Yoyogi Park
- Yoyogi National Gymnasium
- NHK Broadcasting Center
