= F-class submarine =

F-class submarine may refer to:

- British F-class submarine, three submarines of the Royal Navy, built between 1913 and 1916
- Italian F-class submarine, 21 submarines of the Italian Regia Marina(Royal Navy), three of the Portuguese Navy, and three of thSpanish Navy, built between 1915 and 1918
- United States F-class submarine, four submarines of the United States Navy built in 1909
- Type F submarine, five submarines of the Imperial Japanese Navy built between 1917 and 1922
