= Fukutoshin Line =

Subway line in Tokyo, Japan

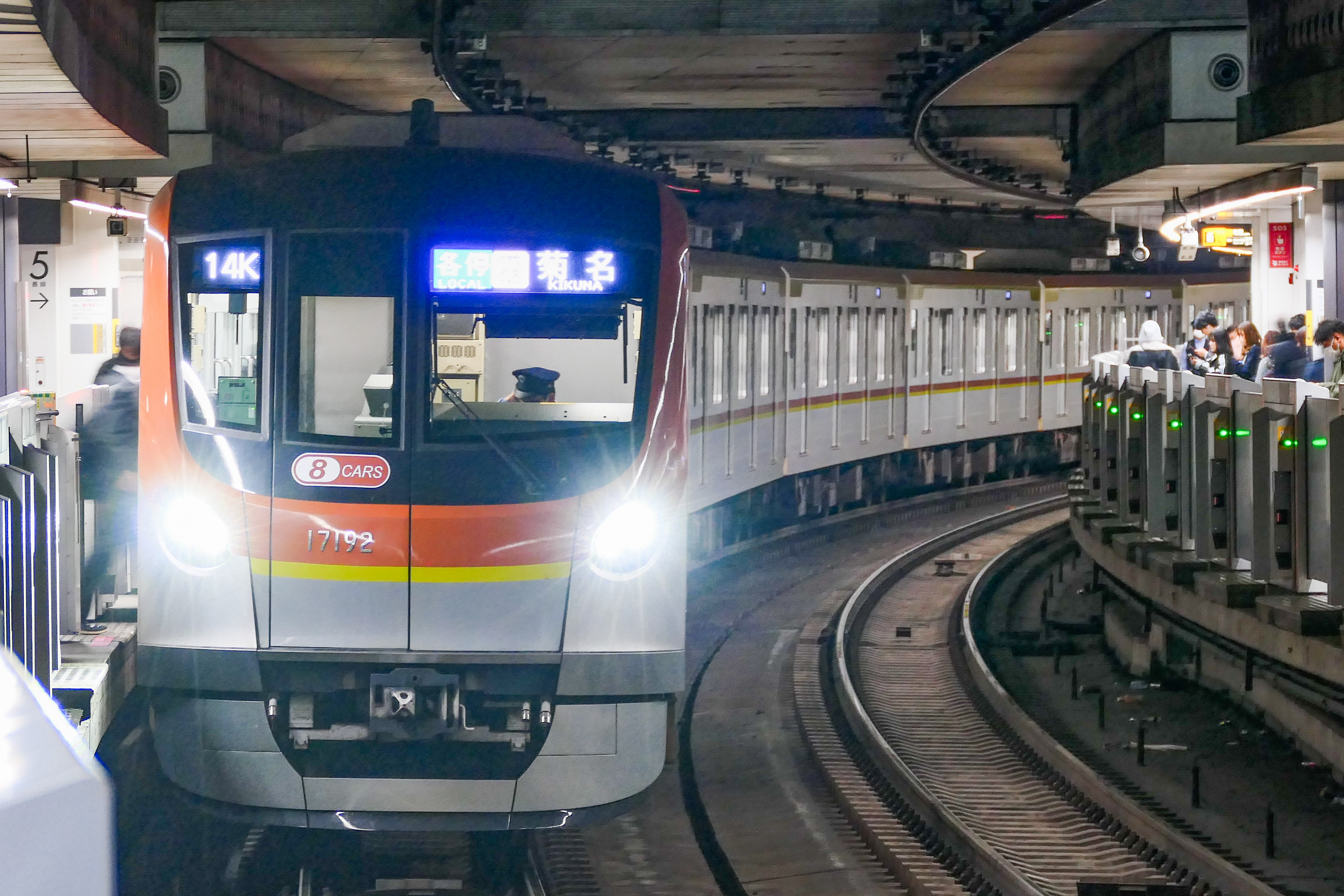
- A Fukutoshin Line 17000 series train

Overview
- Other name: Line 13
- Native name: 副都心線
- Status: In service
- Owner: Tokyo Metro Co., Ltd.
- Line number: F
- Locale: Tokyo
- Termini: Wakōshi; Shibuya
- Stations: 16
- Color on map: Brown

Service
- Type: Rapid transit
- System: Tokyo subway (Tokyo Metro)
- Operator(s): Tokyo Metro Co., Ltd.
- Depot: Wakō
- Rolling stock: Tokyo Metro 10000 series; Tokyo Metro 17000 series; Seibu 6000 series; Seibu 6050 series; Seibu 40000 series; Seibu 40050 series; Tobu 9000 series; Tobu 9050 series; Tobu 50070 series; Tokyu 5000 series; Tokyu 5050 series; Tokyu 5050-4000 series; Yokohama Minatomirai Railway Y500 series; Sotetsu 20000 series
- Daily ridership: 363,654

History
- Opened: 7 December 1994; 31 years ago 14 June 2008; 18 years ago (as Fukutoshin Line)
- Last extension: 2008

Technical
- Line length: 20.2 km (12.6 mi)
- Num of tracks: 2
- Track gauge: 1,067 mm (3 ft 6 in)
- Minimum radius: 160.4 m (526 ft)
- Electrification: Overhead line, 1,500 V DC
- Operating speed: 80 km/h (50 mph)
- Signalling: Cab signalling, closed block
- Train protection system: New CS-ATC, ATO
- Maximum incline: 4.0%
Route map
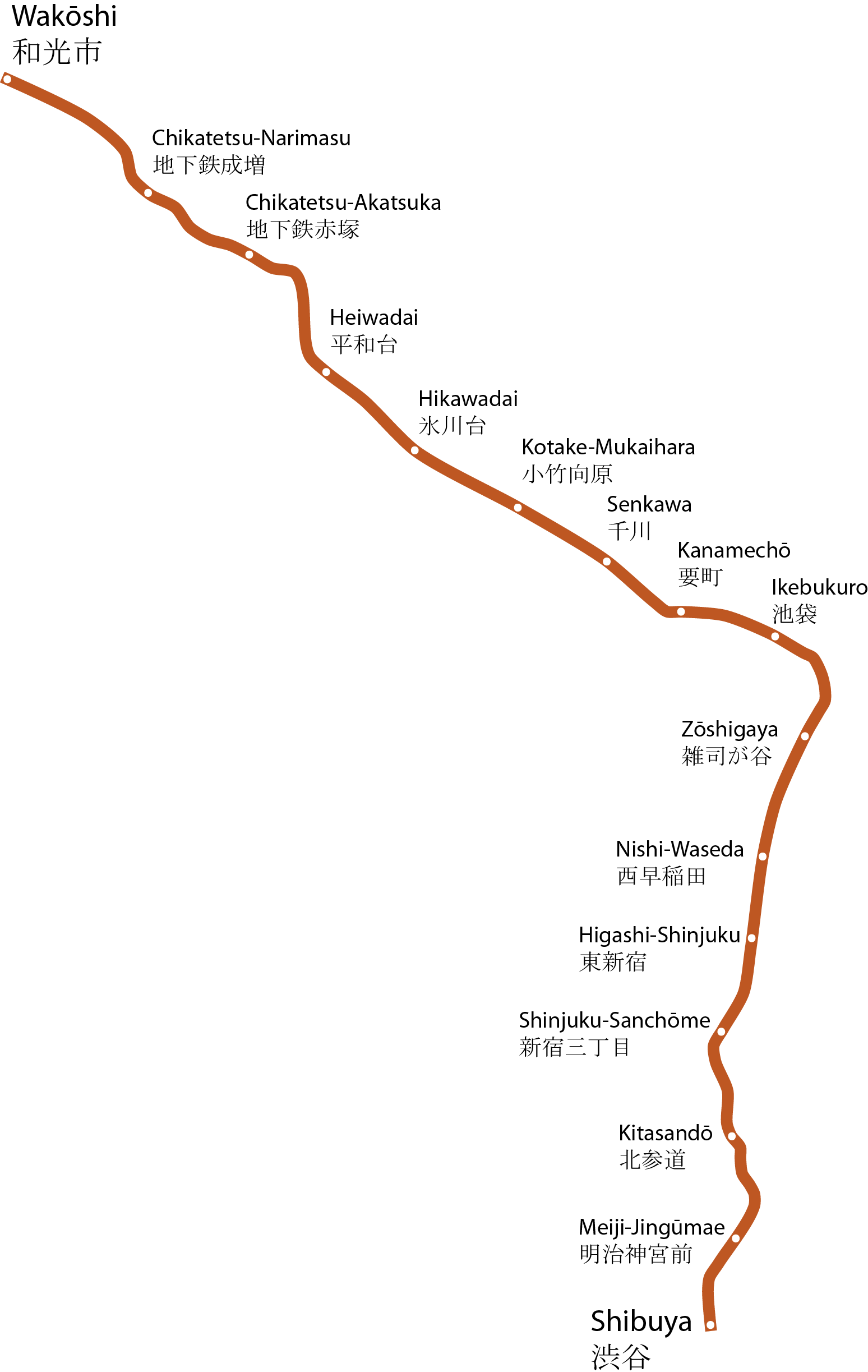

The Fukutoshin Line (副都心線, Fukutoshin-sen; lit. 'Sub-City Center Line'), formally the No. 13 Fukutoshin Line (13号線副都心線, Jū-san-gō-sen Fukutoshin-sen), is a 20.2-kilometer (12.6 mi) subway line operated by Tokyo Metro in west-central Tokyo and Wako, Saitama, Japan.

The newest line in the Tokyo subway network, it opened in stages between 1994 and 2008. On average, the Fukutoshin Line carried 362,654 passengers daily in 2017, the lowest of all Tokyo Metro lines and roughly one third of its sister Tokyo Metro Yūrakuchō Line (1,124,478).

Fukutoshin is Japanese for "sub-city/secondary city center", and the Fukutoshin Line connects three of Tokyo's secondary city centers: Ikebukuro, Shinjuku and Shibuya. Prior to its opening, only JR East had rail service between the three (on the Yamanote Line, the Saikyō Line and the Shōnan-Shinjuku Line).

== Overview ==
The Fukutoshin Line is the deepest metro line in Tokyo, with an average depth of 27 meters (89 ft). At Shinjuku-sanchōme Station, the line passes under the Marunouchi and above the Shinjuku lines at a depth of 15 meters (49 ft), with a gap of only 11 centimeters (4.3 in) to the Shinjuku Line tunnel. The deepest section is at the immediately adjacent Higashi-Shinjuku Station, where the line goes down to 35 meters (115 ft), partly due to an underground space reservation for a possible future extension of the Jōetsu Shinkansen to Shinjuku.

It is the second Tokyo Metro line to feature express services, after the Tōzai Line; however, unlike the Tōzai Line (where rapid services are only offered on the Tōyōchō – Nishi-Funabashi section), the Fukutoshin Line offers express services throughout the line, a first for Tokyo Metro. Express trains pass local trains at Higashi-Shinjuku, where additional tracks are installed for this purpose. Local trains stop at all stations.

When first opened, the line operated through services to Kawagoeshi Station on the Tobu Tojo Line and Hannō Station on the Seibu Ikebukuro Line. From 16 March 2013, the Tōkyū Tōyoko Line moved to share the line's Shibuya terminus, and since then through services have operated onto the Minatomirai Line via the Tōyoko Line, terminating at Motomachi-Chūkagai Station in Yokohama. This is a rare instance of a Tokyo Metro train operating on four companies' tracks.

Since the opening of the section between Ikebukuro and Shibuya station, the Fukutoshin Line operates as a one-man operation subway line between Kotake-Mukaihara Station and Shibuya Station where chest-high platform edge doors are installed on the station platforms to aid the drivers. From 28 March 2015, one-man operation was extended from Kotake-Mukaihara to Wakōshi station, making this the third Tokyo Metro line to fully operate as one-man operation, following the Namboku Line and Marunouchi Line.

As with most Tokyo Metro lines, the first car of the Fukutoshin Line is designated a "women-only car" before and during the morning rush hour. During these hours only women, children of elementary school age or younger and physically disabled passengers (and their carers) may board the first car.

== History ==
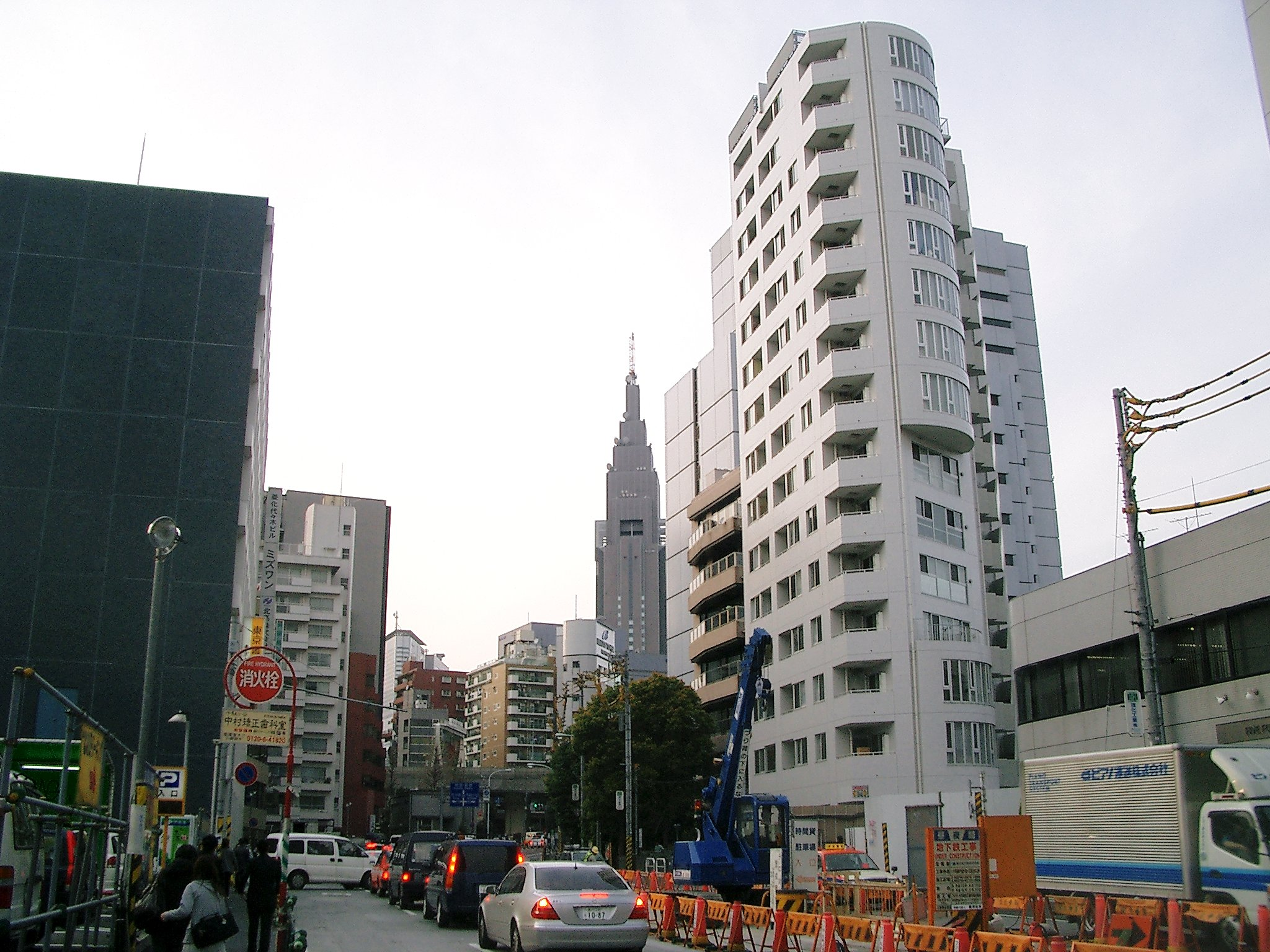
Construction at Kitasandō Station, 2006

The line was initially planned in 1972 as Line 13 running from Shiki to Shinjuku, with the possibility of further extension to Shibuya, Shinagawa and Haneda Airport. The new line was conceived to relieve congestion along this busy corridor, and to provide convenient through service between the northwest, the southwest and the central part of Tokyo served by the Yamanote Line.

In 1985, a second Ministry of Transportation committee proposed that the line terminate at Shibuya. Part of the northern end of the original plan line became unnecessary following improvements to the Tobu Tojo Line and the beginning of through service from the Yurakucho Line.

The original plan for the Fukutoshin Line only contained fifteen stations, however in May 1999 a plan for an additional station "Shin-Sendagaya" (later renamed Kitasandō) between Shinjuku-sanchōme and Meiji-Jingūmae was included due to an increase in demand from the area.

A 3.2 km (2.0 mi) segment from Kotake-Mukaihara to Ikebukuro, running parallel to the Yurakucho Line on separate tracks began operation in 1994. This segment was initially known as the Yūrakuchō New Line (有楽町新線, Yūrakuchō Shin-sen), and was operated with no intermediate stops.

The newest segment connecting the districts of Shinjuku and Shibuya via Zōshigaya, Shinjuku-sanchōme, and Meiji-Jingūmae (‘Harajuku’) opened for service on 14 June 2008, officially completing the Fukutoshin Line. Service to the Senkawa and Kanamechō stations, which had been bypassed by the Yūrakuchō New Line, also started on the same day.

Technical problems resulted in delays of up to 30 minutes during the Fukutoshin Line's first few days of operation.

On 6 March 2010, express services began stopping at Meiji-Jingūmae on weekends and holidays.

From 10 September 2012, 10-car 5050-4000 series sets entered revenue service on the Tokyo Metro Fukutoshin Line, with inter-running through to the Seibu Ikebukuro Line (via Seibu Yurakucho Line) and Tobu Tojo Line.

From the revised timetable effective 18 March 2023, through services to and from the Sotetsu Line courtesy of the Tokyu and Sotetsu Shin-Yokohama Line began operation. This operation sees most express services continuing as far south as Shōnandai Station on the Sotetsu Izumino Line by way of the Toyoko Line.

== Stations ==
List of Fukutoshin line stations

- Express and commuter express trains stop at stations marked "●" and pass those marked "｜".
- Local trains stop at all stations.

No.	Station	Japanese	Distance (km)		Comm. Exp.	Express F Liner	S-Train	Transfers	Location	
No.	Station	Japanese	Between stations	From F-01	Comm. Exp.	Express F Liner	S-Train	Transfers	Location	
↑ Through-services to/from Shiki, Kawagoeshi, Shinrin-kōen, Ogawamachi via the Tojo Line ↑
F-01	Wakōshi	和光市 (Note: Wakoshi is shared by both Tobu and Tokyo Metro; Tobu manages the station.)	–	0.0	●	●	Seibu Yūrakuchō Line	Yūrakuchō Line (Y-01; same tracks); Tojo Line (TJ11; Through Service)	Wakō, Saitama	
F-02	Chikatetsu-narimasu	地下鉄成増	2.2	2.2	●	｜	Seibu Yūrakuchō Line	Yūrakuchō Line (Y-02; same tracks); Tojo Line (Narimasu: TJ10)	Itabashi	Tokyo
F-03	Chikatetsu-akatsuka	地下鉄赤塚	1.4	3.6	●	｜	Seibu Yūrakuchō Line	Yūrakuchō Line (Y-03; same tracks); Tojo Line (Shimo-Akatsuka: TJ09)	Nerima	Tokyo
F-04	Heiwadai	平和台	1.8	5.4	●	｜	Seibu Yūrakuchō Line	Yūrakuchō Line (Y-04; same tracks)	Nerima	Tokyo
F-05	Hikawadai	氷川台	1.4	6.8	●	｜	Seibu Yūrakuchō Line	Yūrakuchō Line (Y-05; same tracks)	Nerima	Tokyo
↑ Through-services to/from: ↑: Shakujii-kōen, Hōya, Kiyose, Tokorozawa, Kotesashi, Hannō via Seibu Yūrakuchō Line and Ikebukuro Line (when events are held at the Belluna Dome some trains to/from Kiyose, Tokorozawa are extended to/from Seibukyūjō-mae via Sayama Line); limited commuter liner S-Train to Tokorozawa, to/from Hannō via the Ikebukuro Line, to/from Seibu-Chichibu via Seibu Chichibu Line
F-06	Kotake-mukaihara	小竹向原 (Note: Kotake-mukaihara is shared by both Seibu Railway and Tokyo Metro; Tokyo Metro manages the station.)	1.5	8.3	●	●	｜	Yūrakuchō Line (Y-06; same tracks); Seibu Yūrakuchō Line (SI37; Through Service)	Nerima	Tokyo
F-07	Senkawa	千川	1.1	9.4	｜	｜	｜	Yūrakuchō Line (Y-07)	Toshima	Tokyo
F-08	Kanamechō	要町	1.0	10.4	｜	｜	｜	Yūrakuchō Line (Y-08)	Toshima	Tokyo
F-09	Ikebukuro	池袋	0.9	11.3	●	●	(Note: Weekends and national holidays for alighting passengers only.)	Marunouchi Line (M-25); Yūrakuchō Line (Y-09; for Shin-kiba); Yamanote Line (JY13); Saikyō Line (JA12); Shōnan–Shinjuku Line (JS21); Tojo Line (TJ01); Ikebukuro Line (SI01)	Toshima	Tokyo
F-10	Zōshigaya	雑司が谷	1.8	13.1	｜	｜	｜	Toden Arakawa Line (Kishibojimmae: SA27)	Toshima	Tokyo
F-11	Nishi-waseda	西早稲田	1.5	14.6	｜	｜	｜		Shinjuku	Tokyo
F-12	Higashi-shinjuku	東新宿	0.9	15.5	｜	｜	｜	Ōedo Line (E-02)	Shinjuku	Tokyo
F-13	Shinjuku-sanchome	新宿三丁目	1.1	16.6	●	●	●	Marunouchi Line (M-09); Shinjuku Line (S-02)	Shinjuku	Tokyo
F-14	Kita-sandō	北参道	1.4	18.0	｜	｜	｜		Shibuya	Tokyo
F-15	Meiji-jingūmae (Harajuku)	明治神宮前	1.2	19.2	●	●	｜	Chiyoda Line (C-03); Yamanote Line (Harajuku: JY19)	Shibuya	Tokyo
F-16	Shibuya	渋谷 (Note: Shibuya is shared by both Tokyu Corporation and Tokyo Metro; Tokyu Corporation manages the station.)	1.0	20.2	●	●	●	Tōyoko Line (TY01); Den-en-toshi Line (DT01); Hanzōmon Line (Z-01); Ginza Line (G-01); Yamanote Line (JY20); Saikyō Line (JA10); Shōnan–Shinjuku Line (JS19); Inokashira Line (IN01)	Shibuya	Tokyo
↓ Through-services to/from: ↓: Musashi-Kosugi, Motosumiyoshi, Kikuna, Yokohama via Tōyoko Line; Nishiya via Tōkyū Shin-Yokohama Line and Sōtetsu Shin-Yokohama Line; To Yamato, to/from Ebina via Sōtetsu Main Line; Shōnandai via Sōtetsu Izumino Line; Motomachi-Chūkagai via Minatomirai Line; limited commuter liner S-Train to/from Motomachi-Chūkagai via Minatomirai Line

== Rolling stock ==
=== Tokyo Metro ===
- 7000 series trains (until April 2022)
- 10000 series 10-car (and occasionally 8-car) trains
- 17000 series 8-car and 10-car trains (since 21 February 2021)
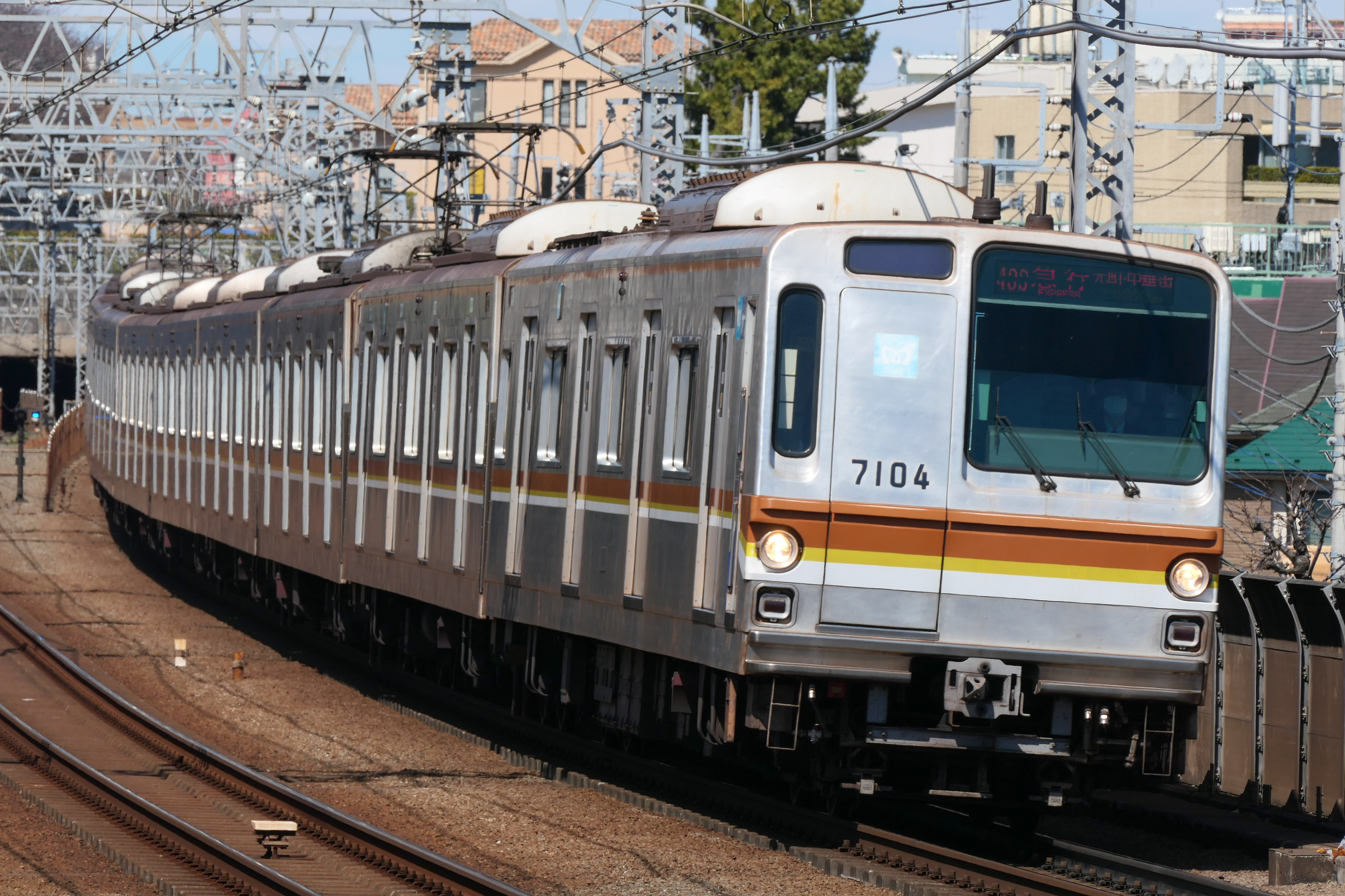
Tokyo Metro 7000 series

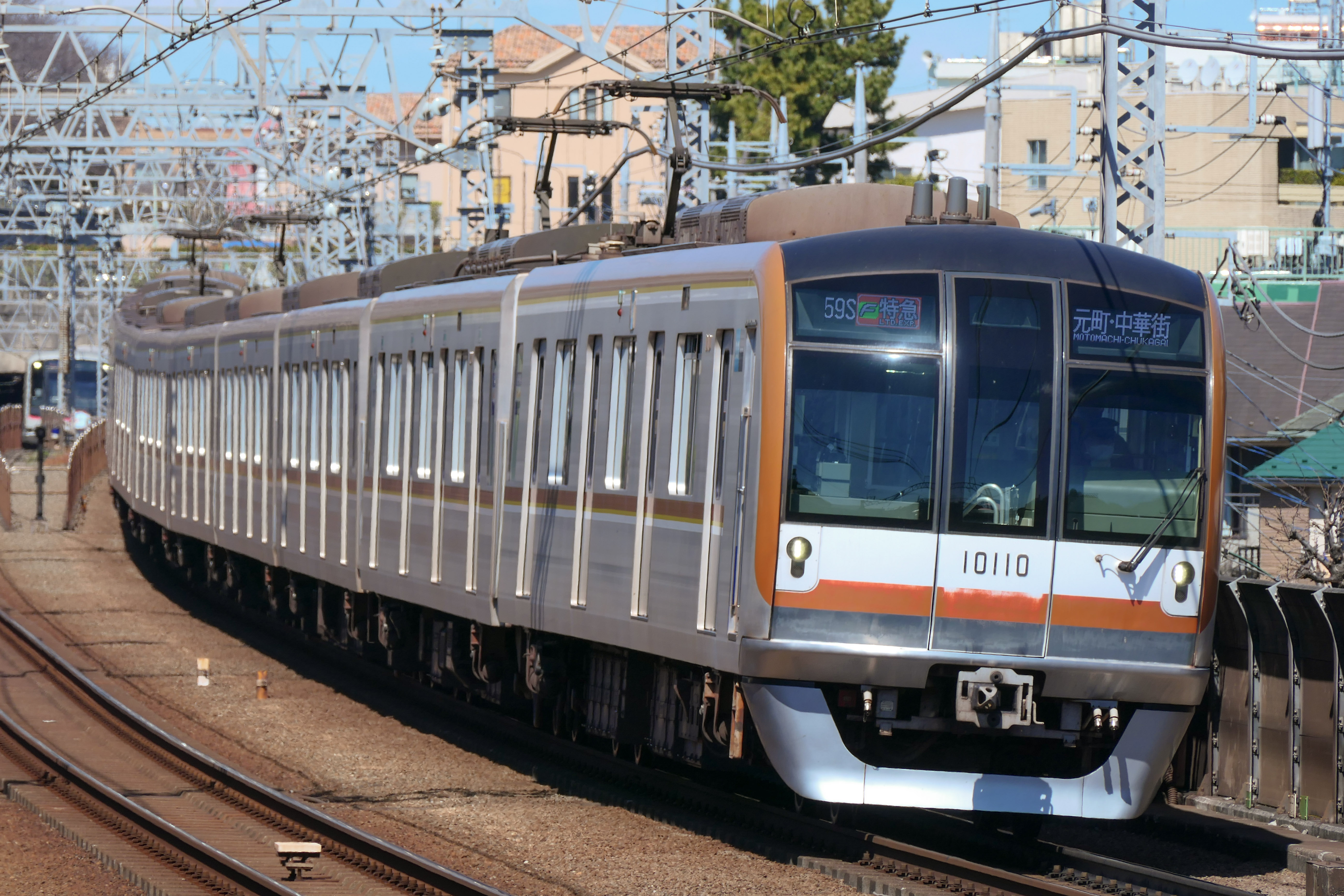
Tokyo Metro 10000 series

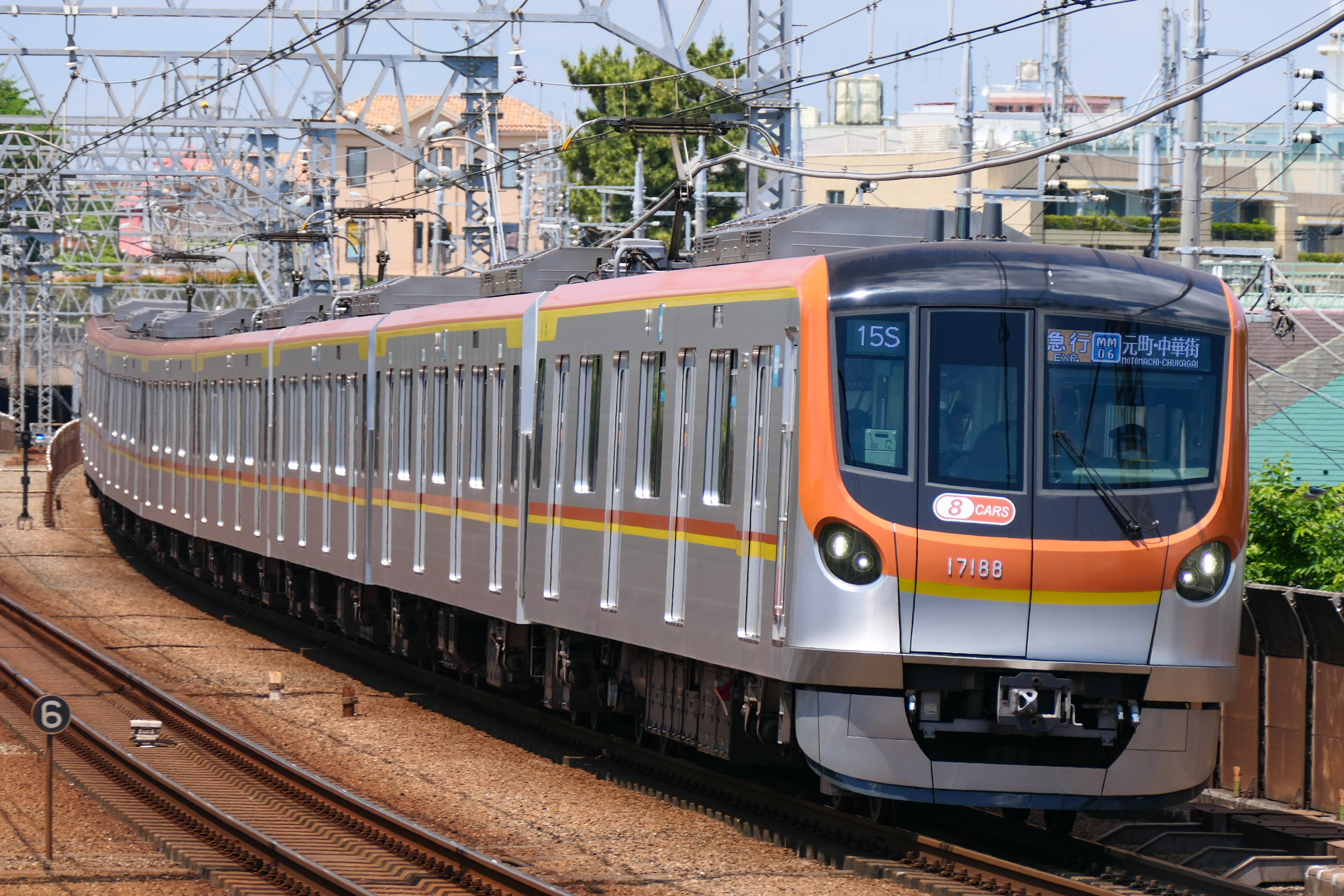
Tokyo Metro 17000 series

=== Other operators ===
- Seibu 6000 series 10-car trains
- Seibu 6050 series 10-car trains
- Seibu 40000 series 10-car trains (since 25 March 2017)
- Seibu 40050 series 10-car trains
- Sotetsu 20000 series 10-car trains
- Tobu 9000 series 10-car trains
- Tobu 9050 series 10-car trains
- Tobu 50070 series 10-car trains
- Tokyu 5000 series 8-car trains
- Tokyu 5050 series 8-car trains
- Tokyu 5050-4000 series 10-car trains (since 10 September 2012)
- Yokohama Minatomirai Railway Y500 series 8-car trains (a Tokyu 5000 series variant)
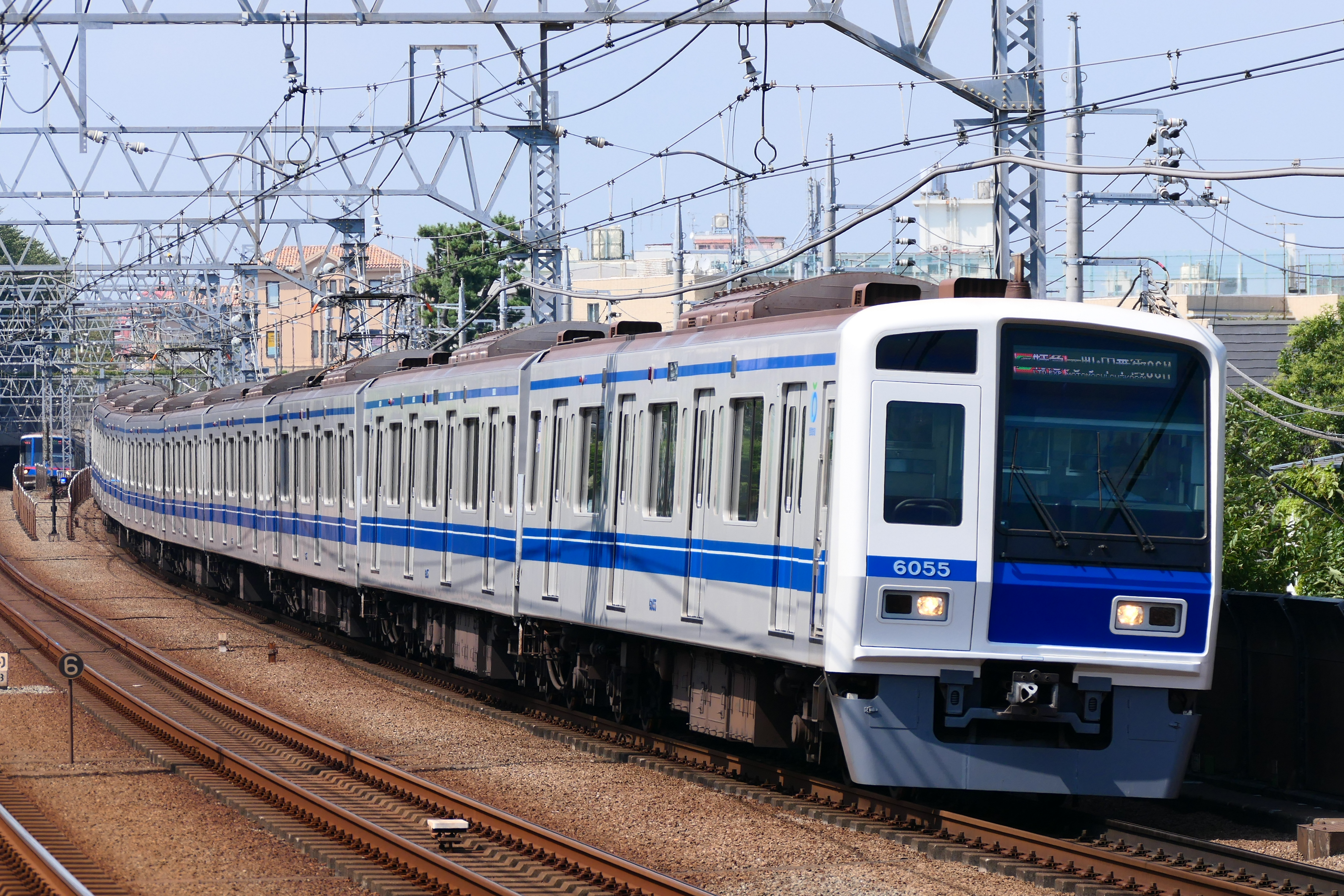
Seibu 6000 series

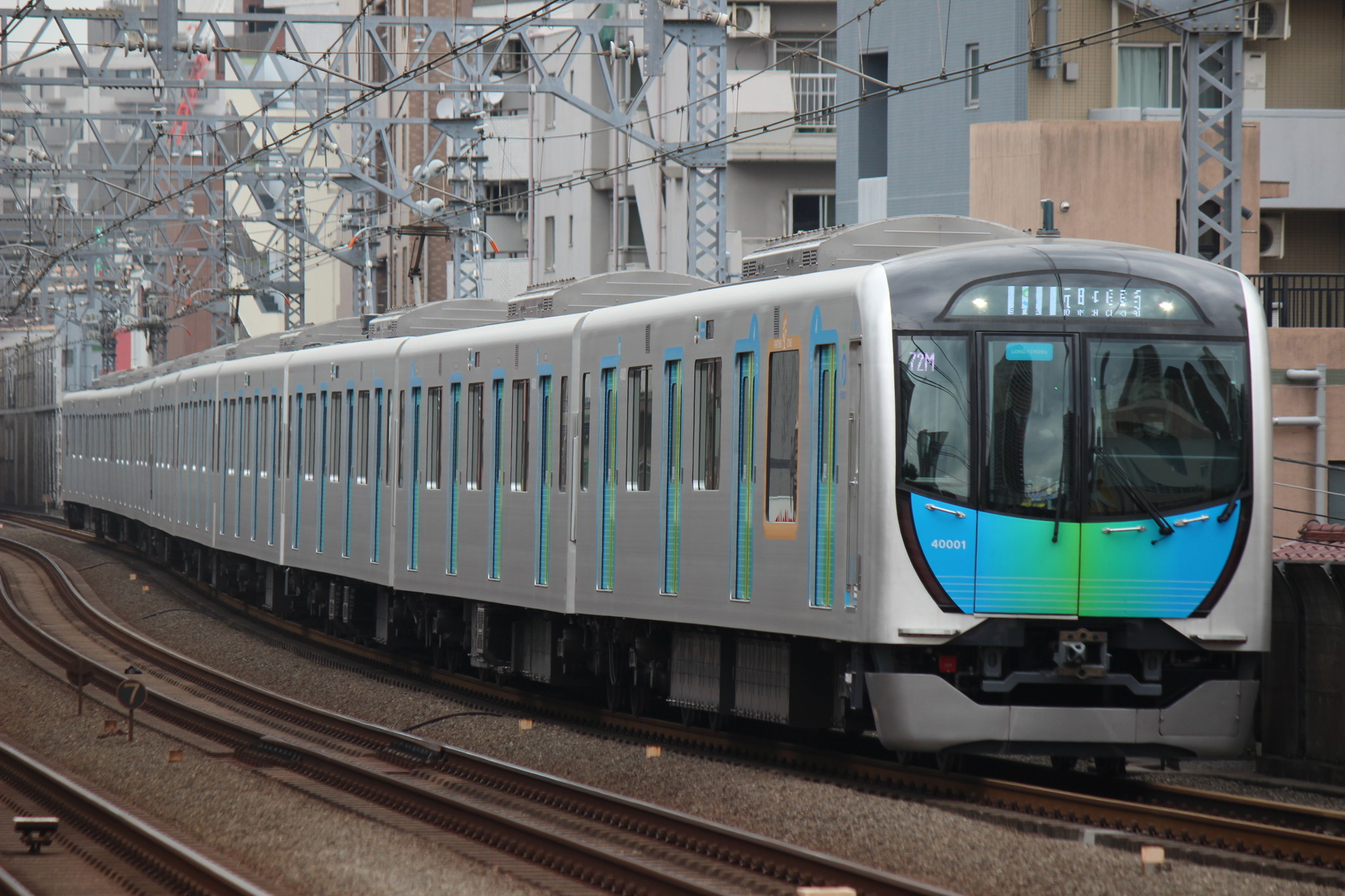
Seibu 40000 series

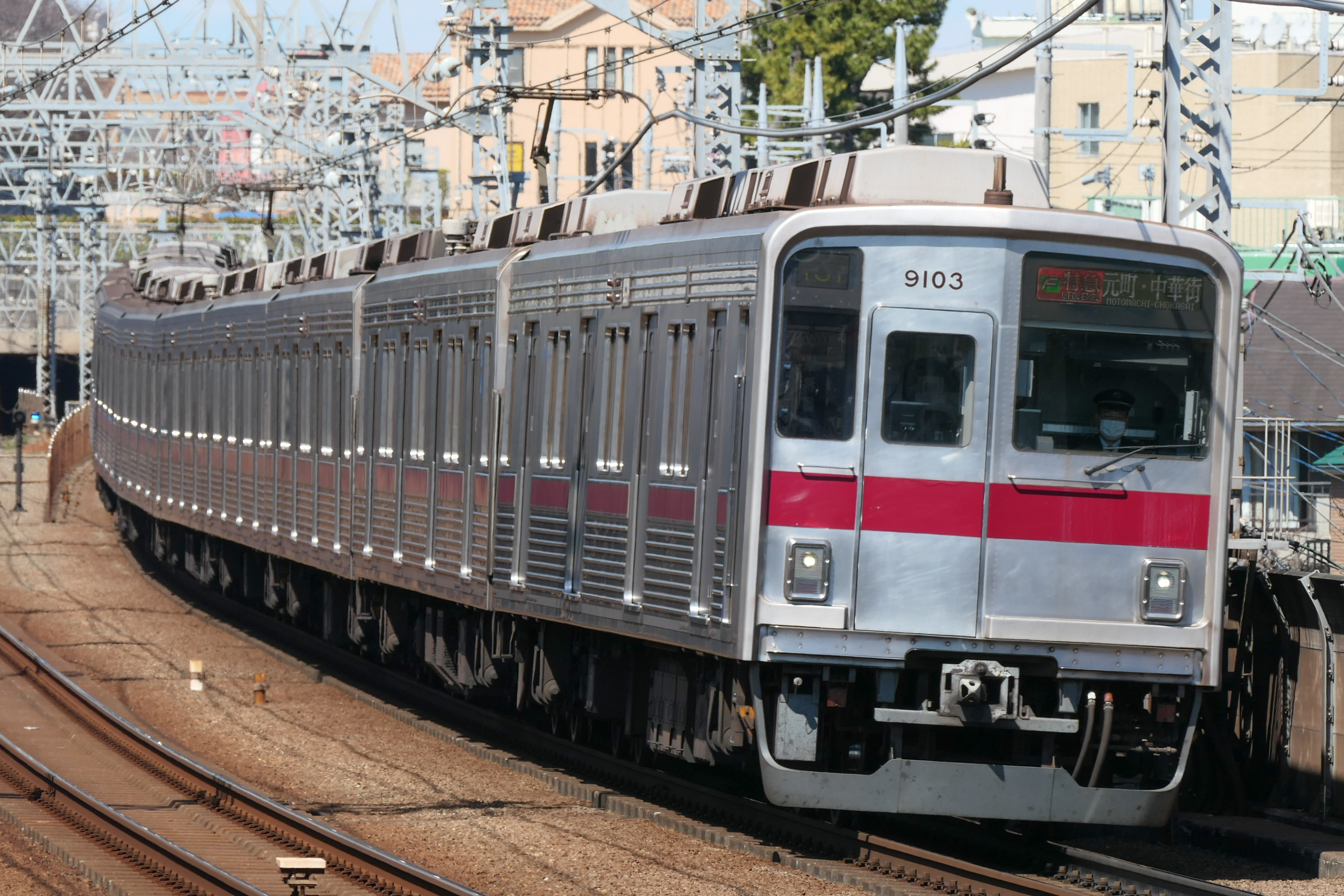
Tobu 9000 series

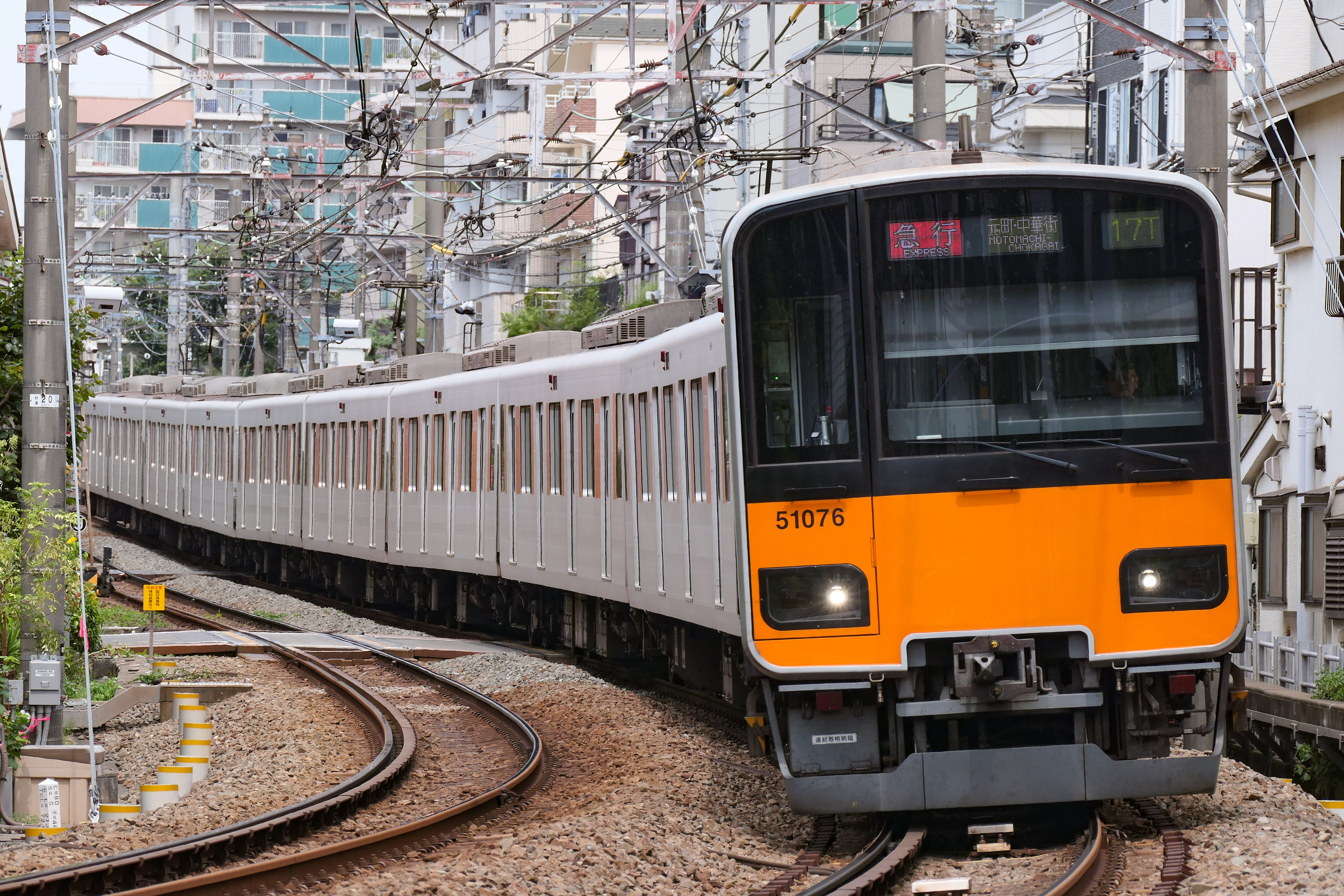
Tobu 50070 series

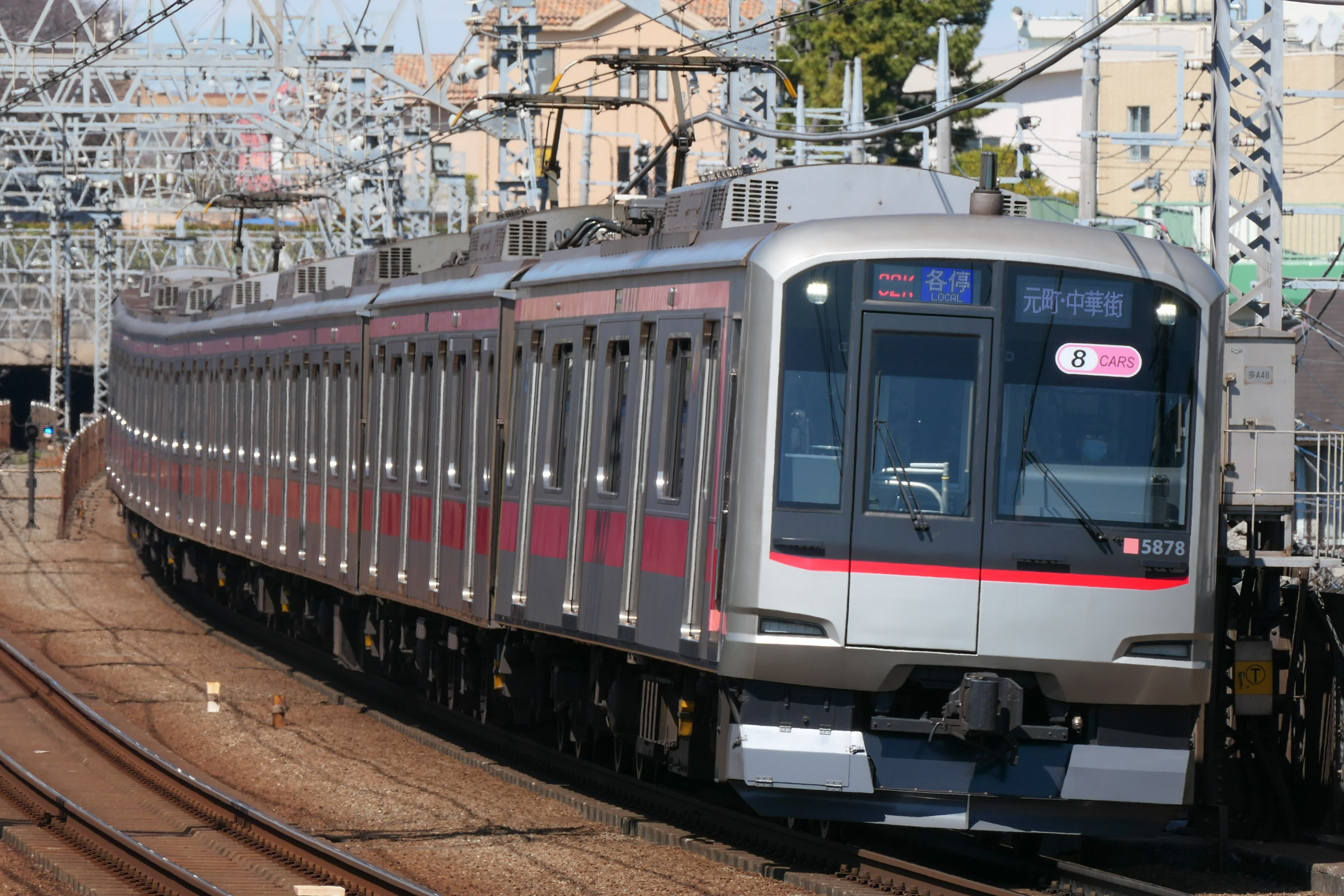
Tokyu 5050 series

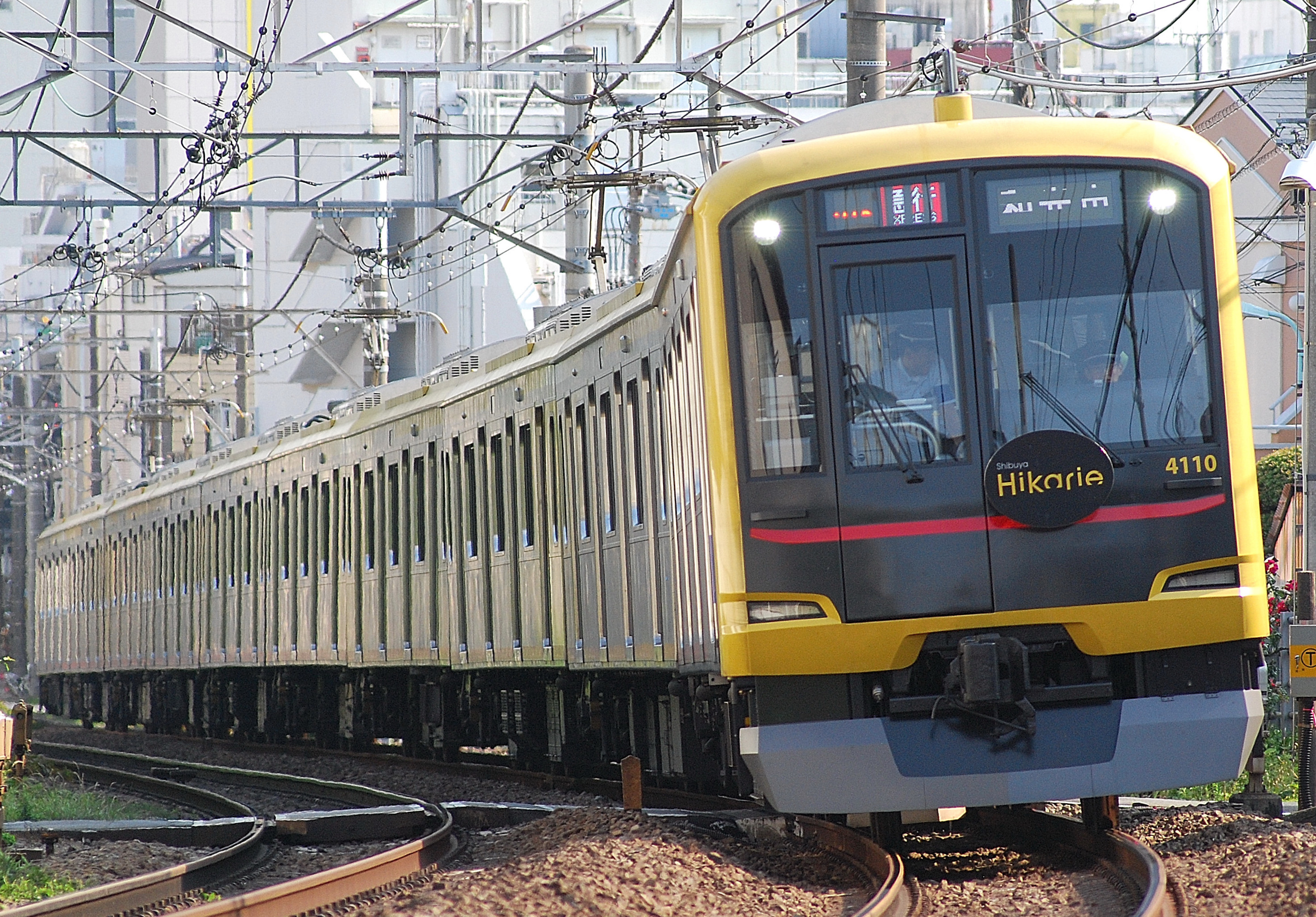
Tokyu 5050-4000 series

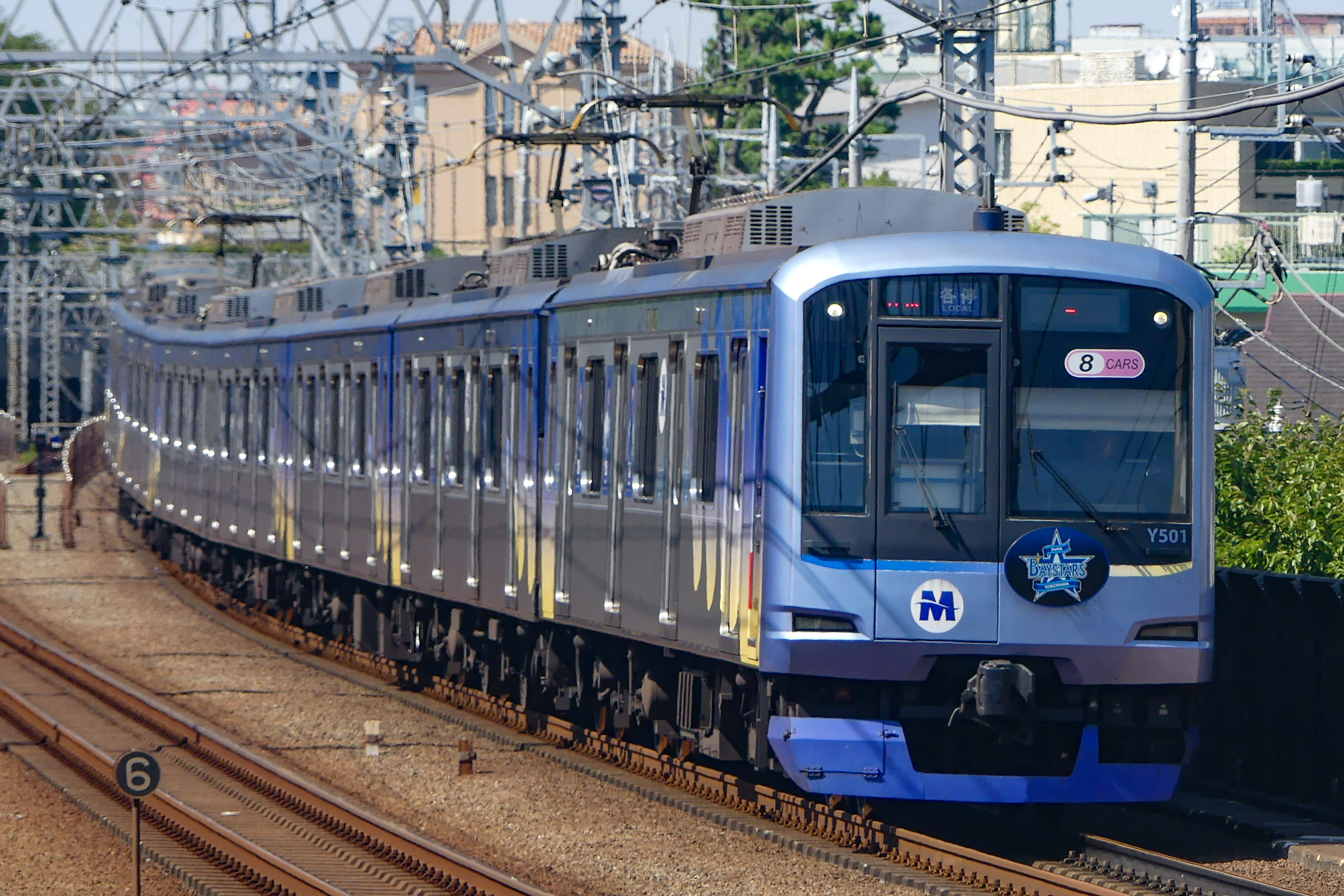
Yokohama Minatomirai Railway Y500 series

== See also ==
- List of railway lines in Japan
