= F-sharp =

F♯ (F-sharp) may refer to:

- F♯ (musical note)
- F-sharp minor, a minor musical scale
- F-sharp major, a major musical scale
- F Sharp (programming language), a .NET programming language
- "F Sharp", a song by Tim Minchin
- "F♯ (Wake Up)", a song by Nuclear Assault
- F♯ A♯ ∞, an album by Godspeed You! Black Emperor
- Rot Lop Fan, a DC Comics character also known as the F-Sharp Bell
- F Sharp (Yellowjackets), an episode of the American TV series Yellowjackets
