= P-type =

P-type or type P may refer to:

== P-type ==
- P-type orbit, type of planetary orbit in a binary system
- P-type asteroid, type of asteroid
- P-type semiconductor
- MG P-type, a type of automobile
- P-type ATPase, evolutionarily related ion and lipid pumps
- P-Type (rapper), a South Korean rapper

== Type P ==
- the Audi Type P, a car
- a Type P thermocouple

== See also ==
- For P (and Q) in propositional logic, see modus ponens.
