= F word =

F Word or The F Word may refer to:

- Any of several words that begins with the letter "f", often used as a euphemism where they may be considered controversial or offensive, particularly; "fuck" and "faggot".

== Film and television ==
- The F Word (British TV series), a cooking show featuring celebrity chef Gordon Ramsay
- The F Word (American TV series), the U.S. version of the cooking show featuring Gordon Ramsay
- The F Word (2005 film), a film starring Josh Hamilton
- The F Word (2013 film), a film starring Daniel Radcliffe and Zoe Kazan (retitled to What If)
- "The F Word" (South Park), a 2009 episode of the U.S. television series South Park
- The F Word (Shameless), an episode of the American TV series Shameless
- "The F Word", an episode from season 4 of the television series Daria

== Music ==
- "The F-Word", a song by Babybird from Bugged released in 2000
- "The F Word", a song by Cannibal Ox from The Cold Vein released in 2001

== Other media ==
- The F-Word (blog), a UK-based feminist blog
- The F-Word (book), a 1995 book by Jesse Sheidlower about English usage of the word "fuck" and translations in other languages
- The F-Word, an exhibition exploring personal tales of forgiveness and reconciliation from around the world by UK charity The Forgiveness Project

== Other uses ==
- FWord pointer, another name for a far pointer in computer programming
- The Other F Word, a 2011 documentary film, in this film the "other F word" is "family"
