= Sumiko Hennessy =

American social worker, trauma therapist, academic and activist

- Born: Sumiko Tanaka; November 8, 1937 (age 88); Yokohama, Japan
- Education: Tokyo University of Foreign Studies; Fordham Graduate School of Social Service; University of Denver
- Occupations: Professor Emeritus, Tokyo University of Social Welfare
- Spouse: Richard Hennessy
- Awards: Colorado Women's Hall of Fame (1989)

Sumiko Tanaka Hennessy (born November 8, 1937) is an American social worker, trauma therapist, academic, and activist for the Asian-American community in Denver, Colorado. Born in Yokohama, Japan, she was a founding board member and later executive director of the Asian Pacific Development Center. In 2000 she helped inaugurate the Tokyo University of Social Welfare and is presently a professor emeritus of that institution. In 2004 she and her husband founded Crossroads for Social Work, LLC, a training program for mental health professionals in Japan and the United States. The recipient of numerous awards, she was inducted into the Colorado Women's Hall of Fame in 1989.

== Early life and education ==
Sumiko Tanaka was born in Yokohama, Japan, on November 8, 1937. She studied French at an Alliance française school with an eye to pursuing a diplomatic career. She next enrolled at the Tokyo University of Foreign Studies, but upon learning that as a woman, she would never qualify to be an ambassador for Japan, she switched her career plans to social work. She earned her bachelor's degree in French, and then studied as a scholarship student at a Belgian school of social work in 1960. In 1961 she received a scholarship to study at the Fordham Graduate School of Social Service in New York, completing her Master of Social Work degree in 1963 and her doctorate at the University of Denver.

== Career ==
After receiving her degree, Hennessy was a social worker at several New York City facilities, including the Henry Street Settlement, the Bird S. Coler Hospital for chronic care, and Maimonides Medical Center. In 1969 she began teaching as an assistant professor at New York University Silver School of Social Work, a position she held until 1974. At the same time, her husband taught social work at Long Island University.

In 1974 the two decided to obtain their doctorates at the University of Denver. She combined her university studies with half-time work as chief social worker in the Division for Developmental Disabilities of the Colorado Department of Institutions. Both she and her husband received their doctorates in August 1978, becoming the only couple at the university to receive their doctorates on the same day. She submitted her doctoral dissertation on the topic A study of factors related to the attitudes of public social workers toward case management.

From 1980 to 1984 Hennessy was the assistant superintendent of education and therapy at Ridge Home for the Developmentally Disabled in Wheat Ridge, Colorado. In this capacity, she supervised 150 staffers and a $15 million budget.

In October 1980 Hennessy was a co-founder of the Asian Pacific Development Center, which provides mental health and social services, counseling, and education for Asian American immigrants in the Denver metropolitan area. Hennessy served as a board member of the center for its first three years, then became executive director from 1984 to 2000. As a way of easing Asian "discomfort with mental health assistance", she introduced other services to help clients acclimate to American life, including classes in English as a second language, employment counseling, and youth activities. Hennessy herself raised funds for the center's services by giving lectures and also leading courses for corporations on "understanding Asian cultures, stress management Asian-style, and doing business in Asia".

In February 1984 Hennessy co-founded the Asian Chamber of Commerce in Denver.

In 2000 Hennessy assisted in inaugurating the Tokyo University of Social Welfare and became the school's assistant dean of field education. In 2004 she and her husband founded Crossroads for Social Work, LLC, a training program for mental health professionals in Japan and the U.S.

Hennessy is considered an expert in child abuse and attachment disorder. She wrote the foreword to the 2014 book Attachment, Trauma, and Healing: Understanding and Treating Attachment Disorder in Children, Families and Adults.

== Affiliations and memberships ==
Hennessy has served on the boards of the Women's Foundation of Colorado, the Women's Economic Development Council, the Asian Advisory Council for the Mayor, and the board of governors of Nine Who Care.

== Honors and awards ==
Hennessy received the Outstanding Leadership Award from the Asian Human Services Organization in 1984, the Women at Work award from the Council on Working Women in 1986, and the Silk Wings Award from the National Network of Asian and Pacific Women in 1988. She was inducted into the Colorado Women's Hall of Fame in 1989. In 1998 she received a Community Health Leadership Award from the Robert Wood Johnson Foundation, which named her one of "ten outstanding individuals changing the shape of health care in America". The same year, she was honored as a Denver Women of Distinction by Girl Scouts of Colorado.

== Personal life ==
She met her husband, Richard Hennessy, while both were studying at the Fordham Graduate School of Social Service.

Hennessy is fluent in Japanese, French and English, and reads and writes Chinese.

== Selected articles ==
- "Role of a palliative care and the social worker". The Japanese Journal of Clinical Research on Death and Dying. 28 (2): 150. 2005.

== Sources ==
- Orlans, Michael; Levy, Terry M. (2014). Attachment, Trauma, and Healing: Understanding and Treating Attachment Disorder in Children, Families and Adults (Revised ed.). Jessica Kingsley Publishers. ISBN 978-0857005977.
- Varnell, Jeanne (1999). Women of Consequence: The Colorado Women's Hall of Fame. Big Earth Publishing. ISBN 1555662145.
