= Senkawa Station =

Metro station in Tokyo, Japan

Coordinates: 35.738394°N 139.689191°E

Senkawa Station 千川駅

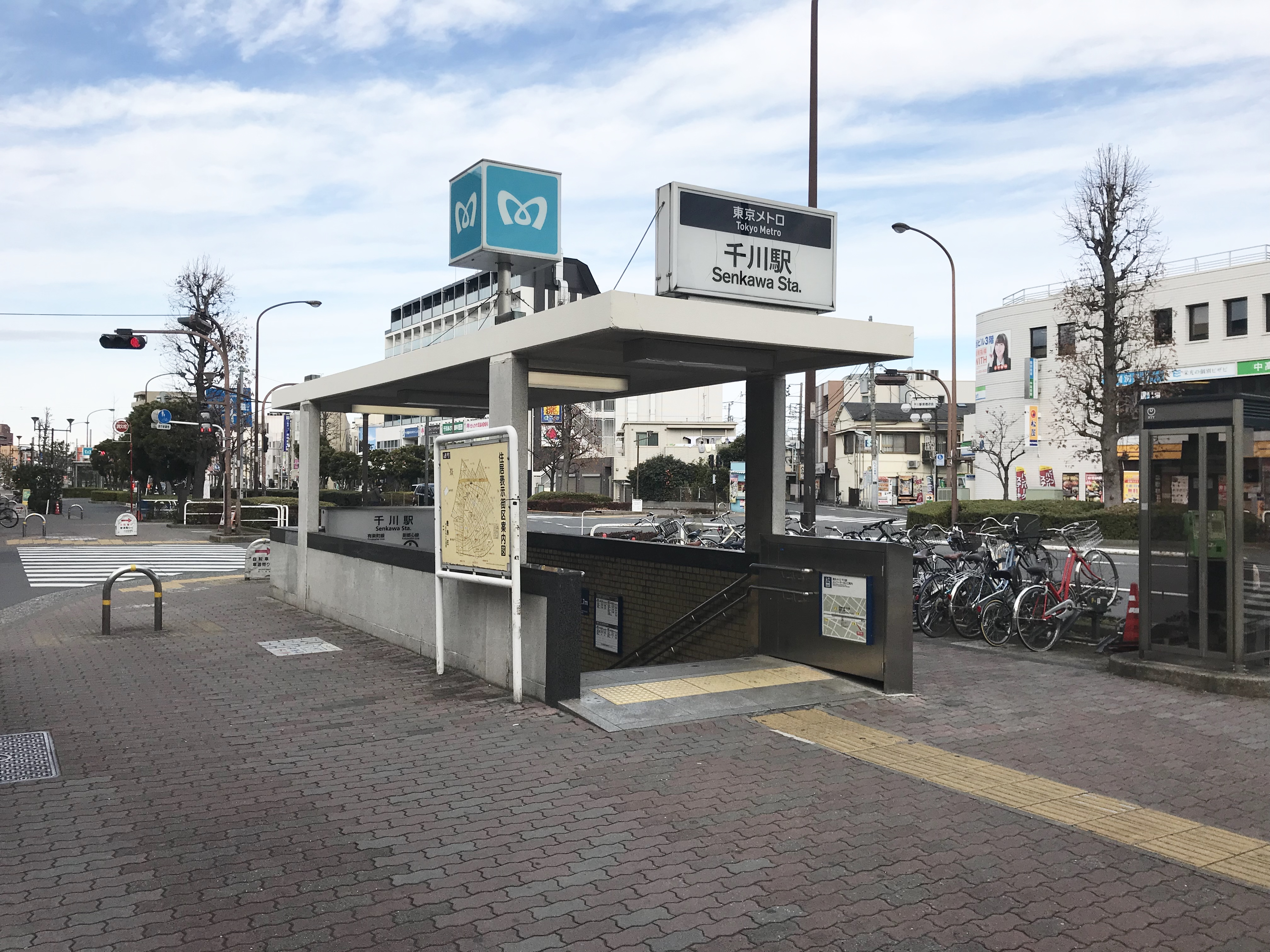
- Exit3 in January 2019

General information
- Location: 3-10-7 Kanamecho, Toshima City, Tokyo; Japan
- System: Tokyo Metro station
- Operator: Tokyo Metro
- Lines: Yūrakuchō Line; Fukutoshin Line
- Platforms: 2 island platforms (1 for each line)
- Tracks: 4 (2 for each line)

Construction
- Structure type: Underground

Other information
- Station code: F-07, Y-07

History
- Opened: 24 June 1983; 43 years ago

Passengers
- 2015: 36,807 daily

Services
Preceding station	Tokyo Metro	Following station
Kotake-mukaihara towards Wakoshi	Yūrakuchō Line	Kanamecho towards Shin-kiba
Kotake-mukaihara towards Wakoshi	Fukutoshin Line Local	Kanamecho towards Shibuya
Location
- Location within Tokyo Yamanote Loop Location within Tokyo wards area Location within Japan

Senkawa Station (千川駅, Senkawa-eki) is a subway station in Toshima, Tokyo, Japan, operated by the Tokyo subway operator Tokyo Metro.

== Lines ==
Senkawa Station is served by the following two lines.

- Tokyo Metro Yurakucho Line (Y-07)
- Tokyo Metro Fukutoshin Line (F-07)

== Station layout ==
The station consists of two island platforms on different levels. The Yurakucho Line platform (tracks 1 and 2) is located on the second basement ("B2F") level, while the Fukutoshin Line platform (tracks 3 and 4) is located on the third basement ("B3F") level.

=== Platforms ===
1
Yūrakuchō Line
for Ikebukuro, Yūrakuchō, and Shin-Kiba
2
Yūrakuchō Line
for Wakōshi
Tobu Tojo Line for Shiki, Kawagoeshi, and Shinrinkōen
3
Fukutoshin Line
- for Kotake-mukaihara, Ikebukuro, Shinjuku-sanchōme, and Shibuya
- Tōyoko Line for Yokohama
- Minatomirai Line for Motomachi-Chukagai
- Sōtetsu Izumino Line for Shōnandai via Shin-yokohama Line
4
Fukutoshin Line
for Wakōshi
Tobu Tojo Line for Shiki, Kawagoeshi, and Shinrinkōen

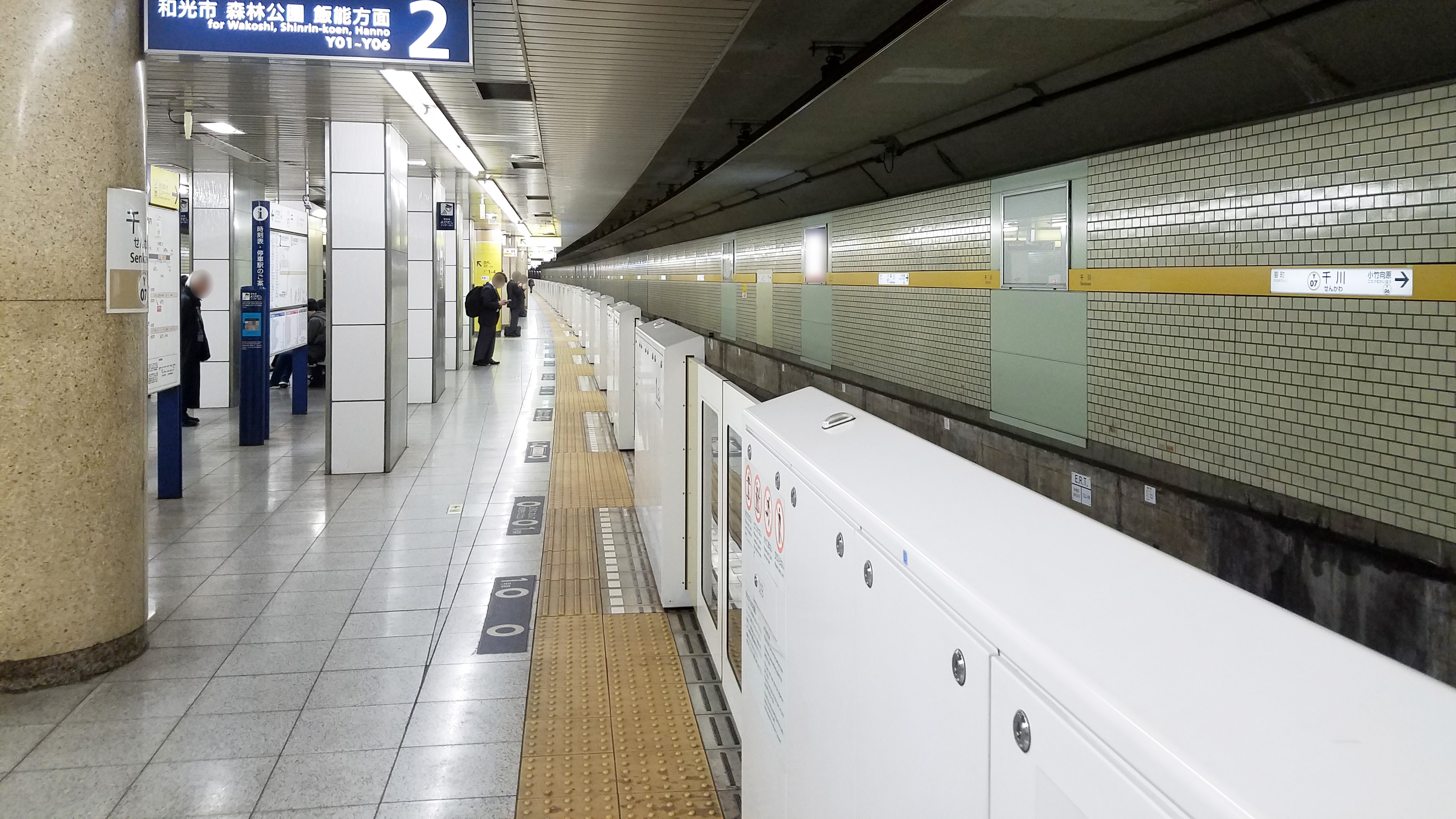
Yurakucho Line platform in March 2019

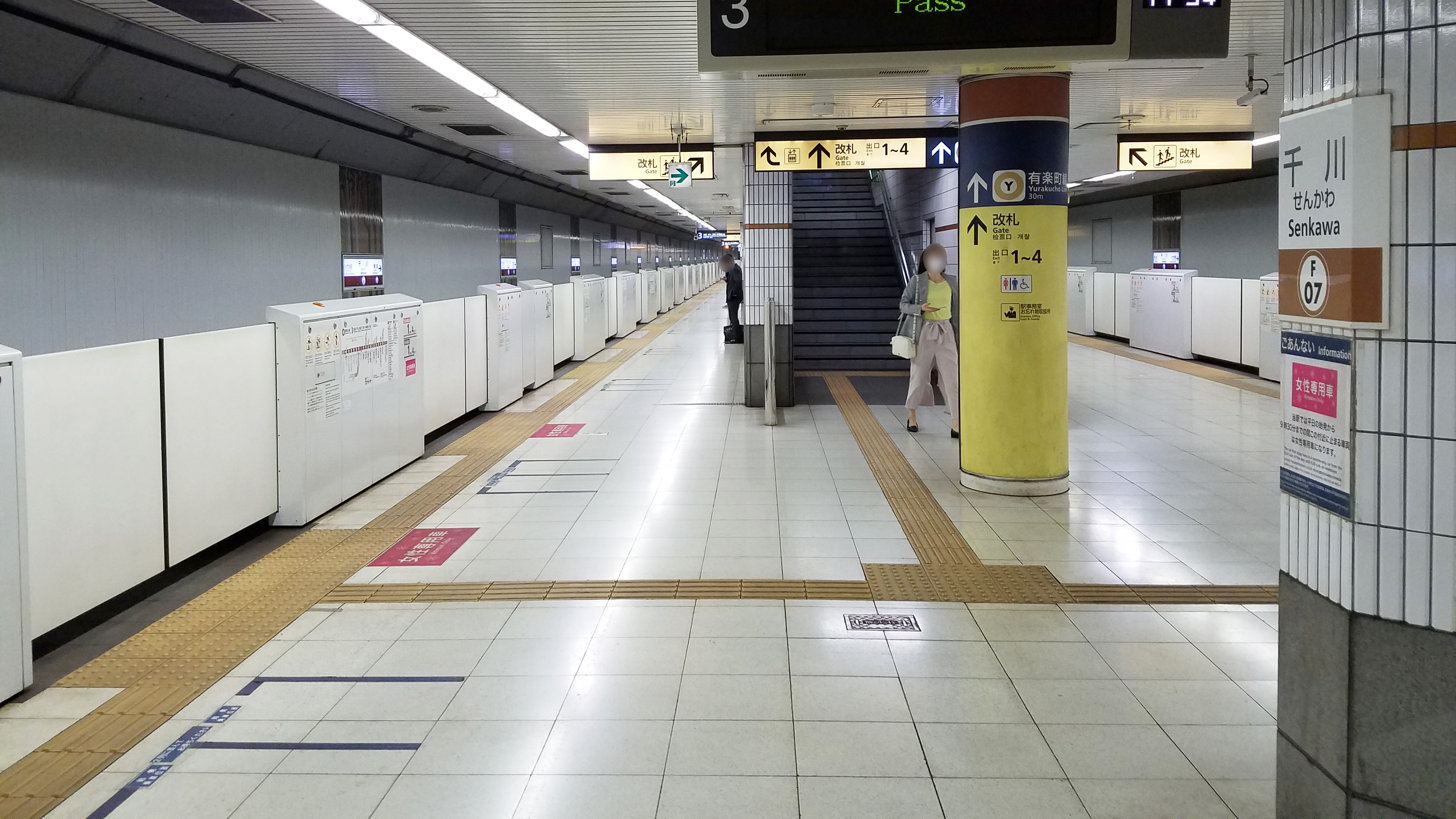
Fukutoshin Line platform in March 2019

== History ==
Senkawa Station opened on 24 June 1983, serving the Tokyo Metro Yūrakuchō Line.

The station facilities were inherited by Tokyo Metro after the privatization of the Teito Rapid Transit Authority (TRTA) in 2004.

The Tokyo Metro Fukutoshin Line also started operating through this station on 14 June 2008.

The Yurakucho Line platforms were equipped with platform edge doors in February 2014, the last station on the line to be equipped.
