= Ikebukuro Station =

Major railway and metro station in Tokyo, Japan

Ikebukuro Station 池袋駅
- The east side of Ikebukuro Station and the Seibu Department Store building in October 2026

General information
- Location: Minami-Ikebukuro, Toshima, Tokyo; Japan
- Coordinates: 35°43′49″N 139°42′41″E
- Operator: JR East; Seibu Railway; Tobu Railway; Tokyo Metro
- Connections: Bus terminal

History
- Opened: 1 April 1903; 123 years ago
Location
- Location within Tokyo Yamanote Loop Location within Tokyo wards area Location within Japan

Ikebukuro Station (Japanese: 池袋駅, romanized: Ikebukuro-eki) is a major railway station located in the Ikebukuro district of Toshima, Tokyo, Japan, shared by the East Japan Railway Company (JR East), Tokyo subway operator Tokyo Metro, and the two private railway operators Seibu Railway and Tobu Railway. With 2.3 million daily passengers on average in 2023, it is the third-busiest railway station in the world (after Shinjuku Station and Shibuya Station), and the busiest station in the Tobu, Seibu, and Tokyo Metro networks. It primarily serves commuters from Saitama Prefecture and other residential areas northwest of the city center. It is the Tokyo terminal of the Seibu Ikebukuro Line and the Tobu Tojo Line.

== Lines ==
=== JR East ===
- Yamanote Line - along with Ōsaki, one of two stations where Yamanote loop trains are taken in and out of service
- Saikyō Line
- Shōnan–Shinjuku Line - through service to Takasaki Line and Utsunomiya Line; also used by Narita Express trains

=== Seibu Railway ===
Seibu Ikebukuro Line (Ikebukuro to Agano) - limited through service to Seibu Chichibu Line; branches to Seibu Toshima Line, Seibu Yūrakuchō Line, and Seibu Sayama Line

=== Tobu Railway ===
Tōbu Tōjō Line (Ikebukuro to Yorii)

=== Tokyo Metro ===
- Tokyo Metro Marunouchi Line
- Tokyo Metro Yūrakuchō Line
- Tokyo Metro Fukutoshin Line

On weekdays, S-Train (Seibu) services skip this station on the Tokyo Metro Yurakucho Line. However, on weekends or holidays, S-Train (Seibu) services stop here on the Tokyo Metro Fukutoshin Line platforms for alighting passengers only.

== Station layout ==
In Ikebukuro Station, there are two main entrances: the East Exit and the West Exit. There are a number of other secondary entrances such as the JR North Exit, the Metropolitan Exit, the various Seibu exits, and multiple subway exits.

The JR lines run north/south through the center. The Tobu platforms are to the northwest and the Seibu platforms are to the southeast. Both Tobu and Seibu operate department stores adjacent to their terminal stations. (Despite their names, "Seibu" (西武) starts with the kanji for "west" (西), but its platforms are on the eastern side of the station, while "Tōbu" (東武) starts with the character for "east" (東), but its platforms are on the western side of the station.)

The Marunouchi Line and Yurakucho Line run east/west two stories underground, while the Tokyo Metro Fukutoshin Line is four stories underground, to the west of the main station complex. The latter line runs south toward Shinjuku and Shibuya along Meiji-dori, and offers through services to Motomachi-Chūkagai Station in Yokohama via the Tokyu Toyoko Line and Minatomirai Line.

Tokyo Metro's underground mall "Echika" is also located inside the station.

=== JR East ===
IKBJY13 JA12 JS21 Ikebukuro Station 池袋駅
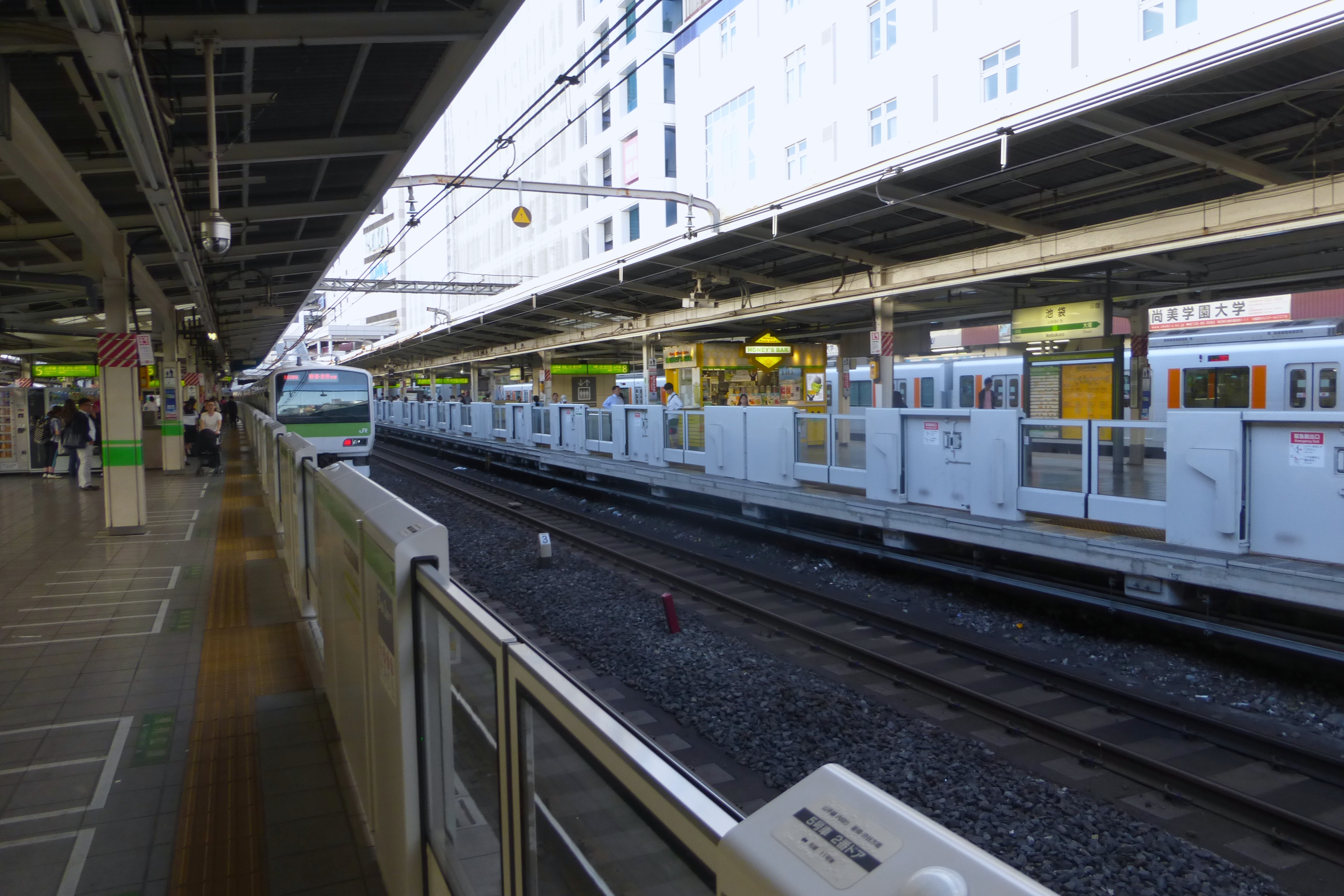
- The Yamanote Line platforms in June 2015

General information
- Location: 1-28-2 Minami-Ikebukuro, Toshima-ku, Tokyo; Japan
- System: JR East station
- Operator: JR East
- Lines: Yamanote Line; Saikyo Line; Shonan-Shinjuku Line
- Platforms: 4 island platforms
- Tracks: 8

Construction
- Structure type: Ground level
- Accessible: Yes

Other information
- Station code: IKB

History
- Opened: 1 April 1903; 123 years ago

Passengers
- FY2024: 998,256 (daily)
Services
Preceding station	JR East	Following station
Mejiro JY14 Next counter-clockwise	Yamanote Line	Ōtsuka JY12 Next clockwise
Shinjuku Terminus	Nikkō and Kinugawa	Urawa towards Tōbu Nikkō or Kinugawa-Onsen
Shinjuku towards Odawara or Zushi	Shōnan–Shinjuku Line Special Rapid Rapid Local	Akabane towards Takasaki, Maebashi or Utsunomiya
Shinjuku towards Ōsaki	Saikyō Line Commuter Rapid Rapid Local	Itabashi JA13 towards Ōmiya
Location

JR East track and platform layout

1	Saikyo Line	for Shinjuku, Shibuya, Ōsaki (via Rinkai Line) for Shin-Kiba (via Sotetsu Line) for Hazawa yokohama-kokudai and Ebina
2	Shōnan-Shinjuku Line	for Shinjuku, Yokohama, Ofuna (via Tokaido Line) for Odawara (via Yokosuka Line) for Zushi
2	■ Limited express Narita Express	for Narita Airport
2	■ Super View Odoriko	for Atami, Izukyū-Shimoda
3	Shōnan-Shinjuku Line	for Ōmiya (via Utsunomiya Line) for Utsunomiya (via Takasaki Line) for Takasaki
4	Saikyo Line	for Akabane, Ōmiya, and Kawagoe
5/6	Yamanote Line	for Shinjuku, Shibuya, and Shinagawa
7/8	Yamanote Line	for Tabata, Ueno, and Tokyo

Chest-high platform edge doors were introduced on the Yamanote Line platforms on 2 March 2013.

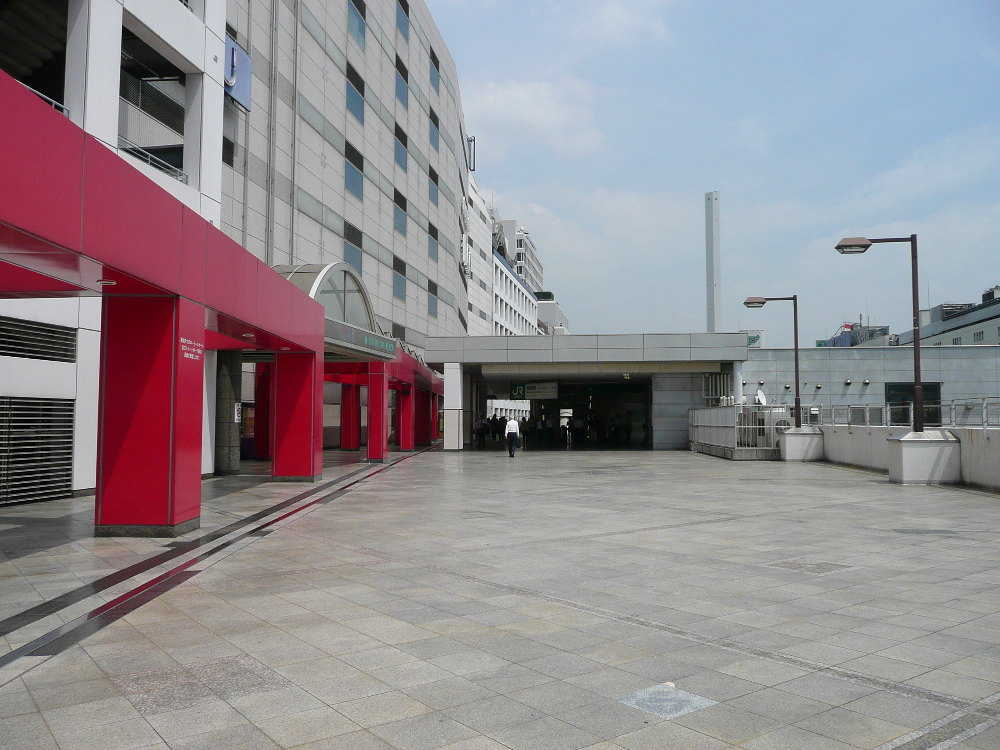
The Metropolitan Exit on the second-floor level

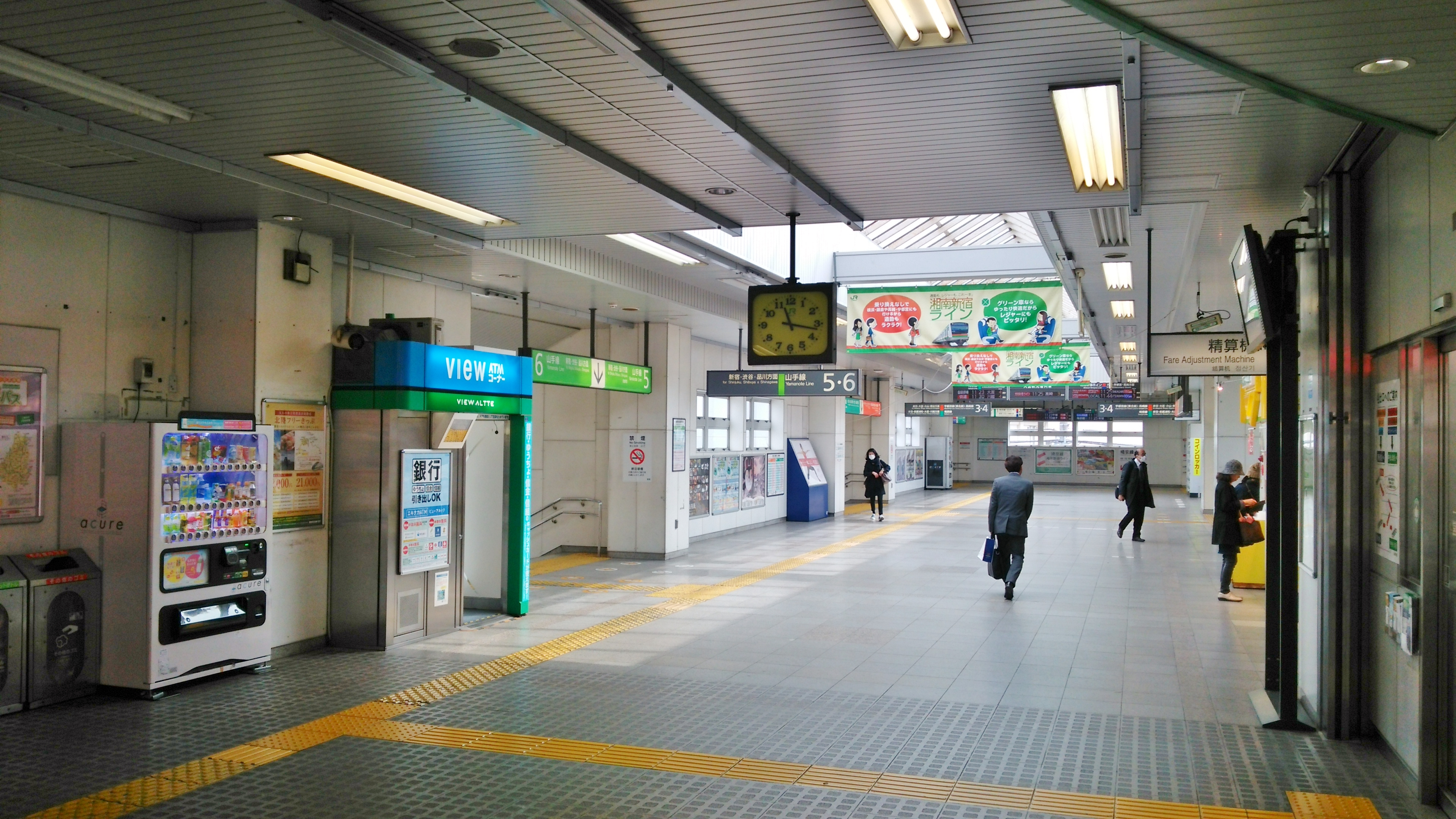
The Metropolitan concourse in March 2016

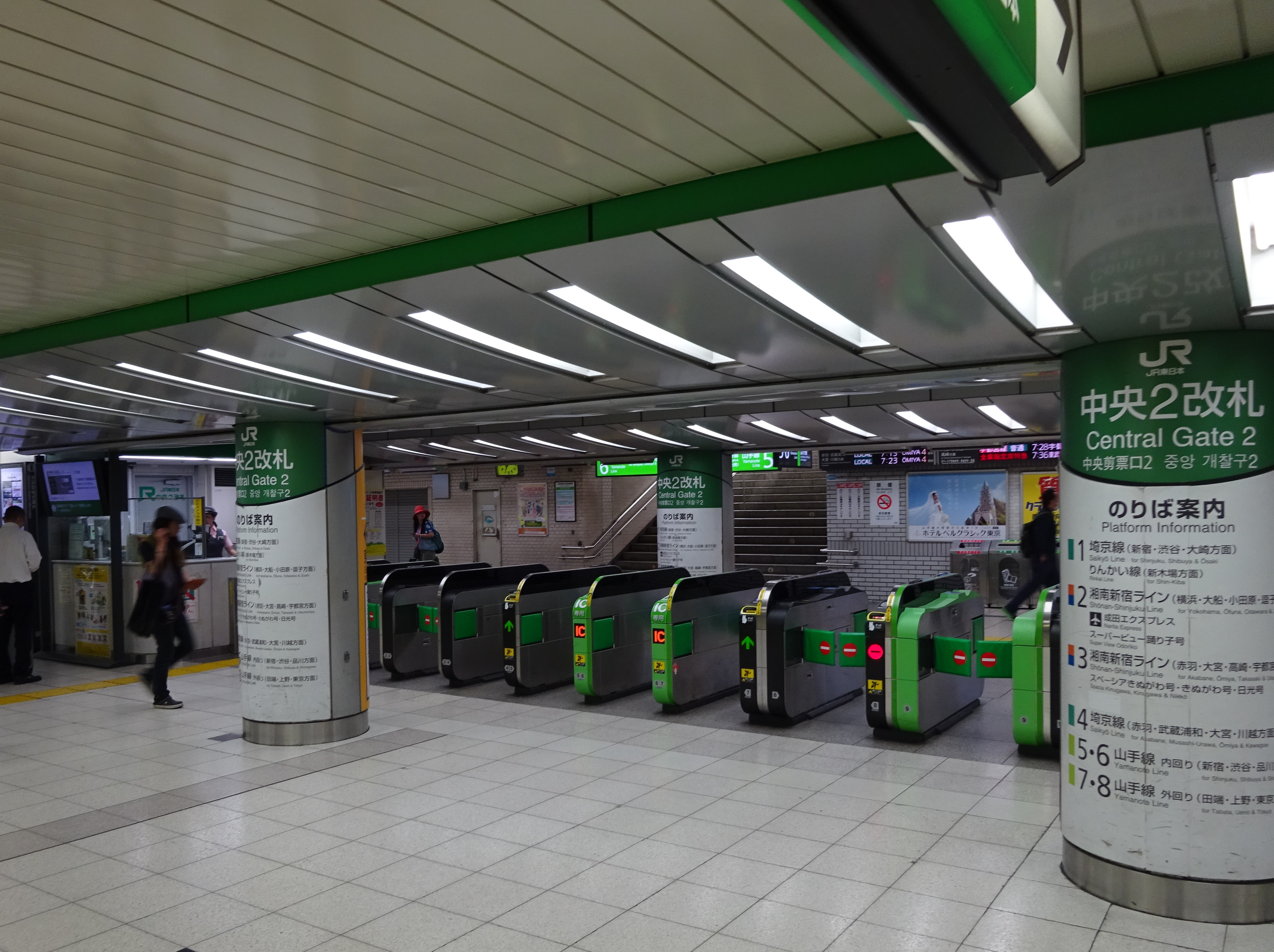
The Central No. 2 gate ticket barriers in June 2016

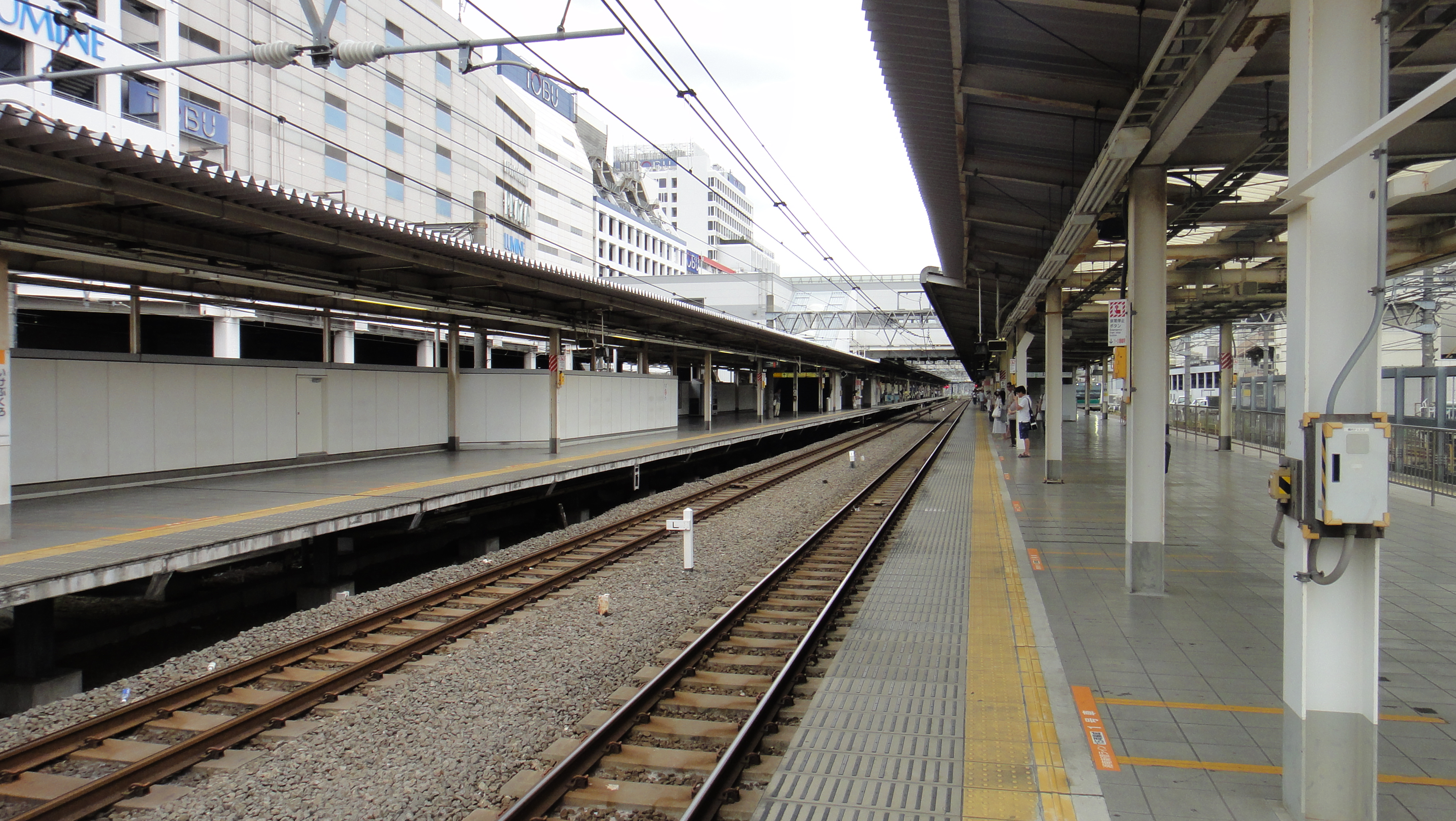
Platform 1/2 (with Saikyo Line on the right) in August 2014

=== Tobu Railway ===
==== Platforms ====
TJ01 Ikebukuro Station 池袋駅
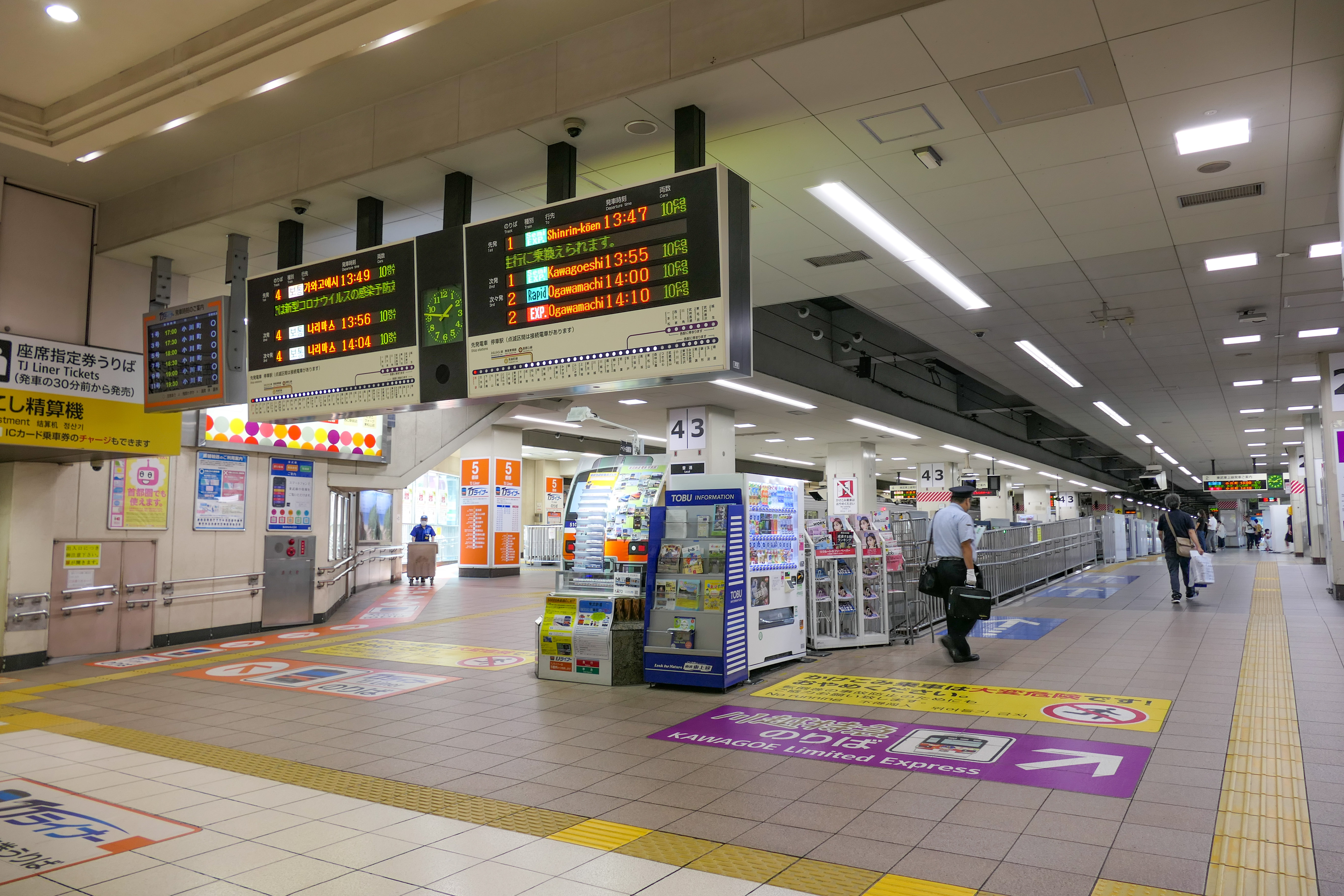
- The view from the buffer stops at the south end of the platforms in July 2021

General information
- Location: 1-21-1 Minamiikebukuro, Toshima-ku, Tokyo; Japan
- System: Tobu station
- Operator: Tobu Railway
- Line: Tobu Tojo Line
- Tracks: 3

Construction
- Structure type: Ground level
- Accessible: Yes

Other information
- Station code: TJ-01

History
- Opened: 1 May 1914; 112 years ago

Passengers
- FY2024: 419,499 (daily)
Services
Preceding station	Tobu Railway	Following station
Fujimino TJ18 towards Ogawamachi	TJ Liner	Terminus
Asakadai TJ13 towards Ogawamachi	Kawagoe	Terminus
Wakōshi TJ11 towards Yorii	Tojo Line Rapid Express	Terminus
Narimasu TJ10 towards Yorii	Tojo Line Express Semi Express	Terminus
Kita-Ikebukuro TJ02 towards Yorii	Tojo Line Local	Terminus
Location

Tobu track and platform layout

The Tobu station has three terminating tracks served by platforms 1 to 5, arranged as shown in the diagram on the right.

1-5	Tobu Tojo Line	for Narimasu, Shiki, Kawagoe, Sakado, and Ogawamachi

Platforms 3 and 5 are normally used for disembarking passengers, although platform 5 is also used for passengers boarding the evening TJ Liner services, which require payment of a supplementary fare.

Since 14 June 2015, the departure melodies used when trains are about to depart from the station are classical themes, with "Allegro" from "Divertimento in D major, K. 136" by Mozart used for platforms 1/2, "Menuetto" from "Eine kleine Nachtmusik" by Mozart used for platforms 3/4, and "Allegro ma non troppo" from the "Pastoral Symphony" by Beethoven used for TJ Liner services departing from platform 5.

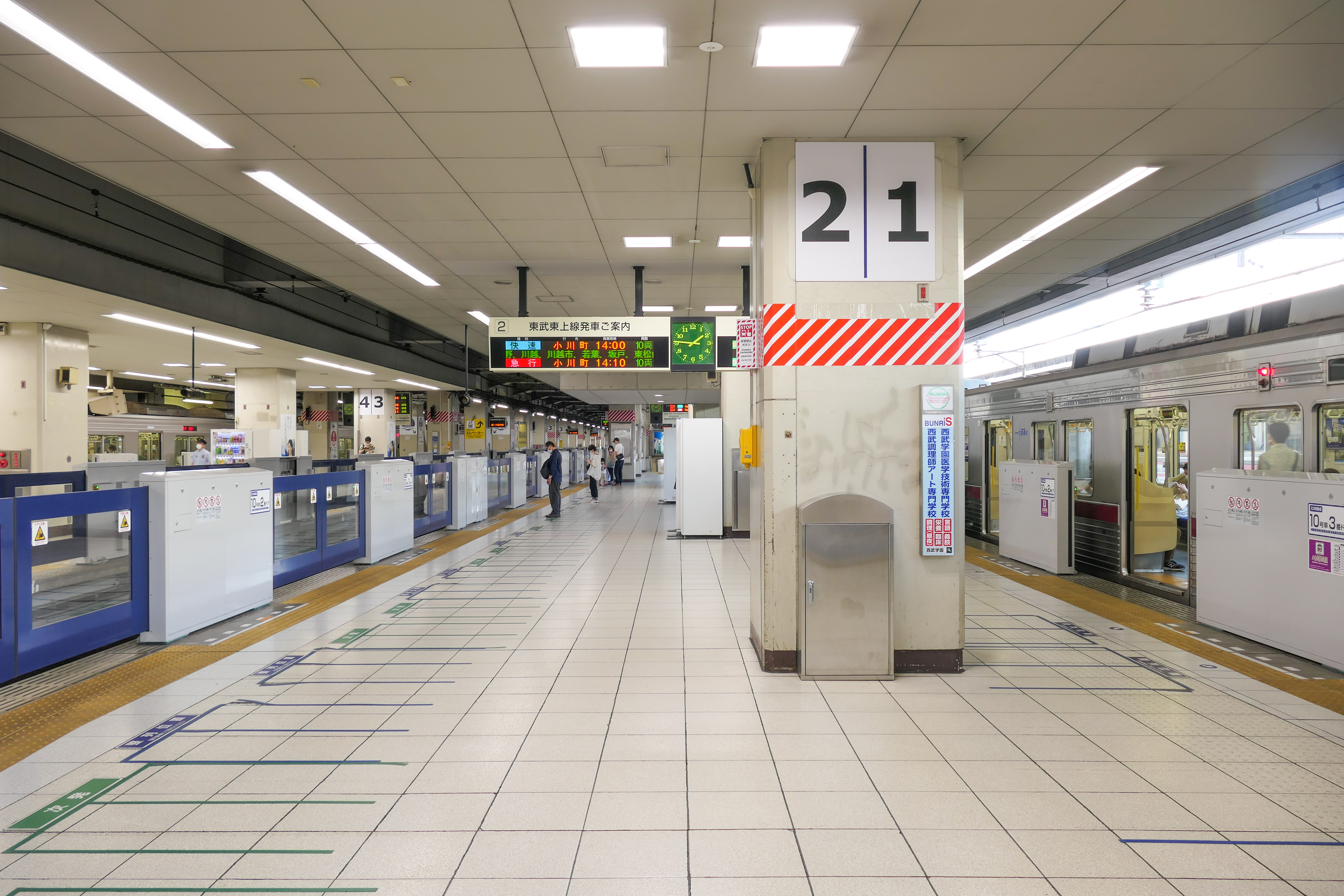
Platform 1 and 2 in July 2021

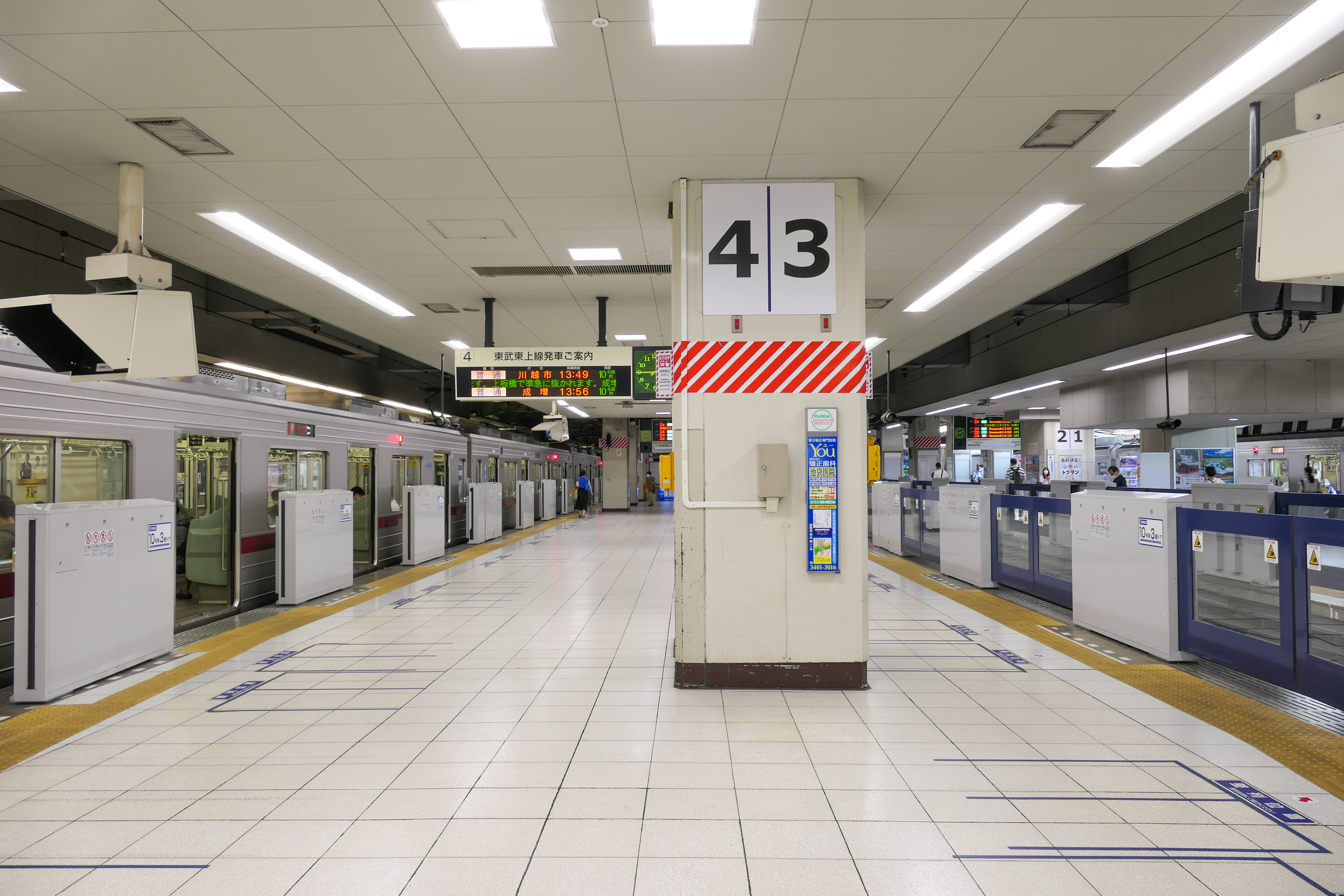
Platform 3 and 4 in July 2021

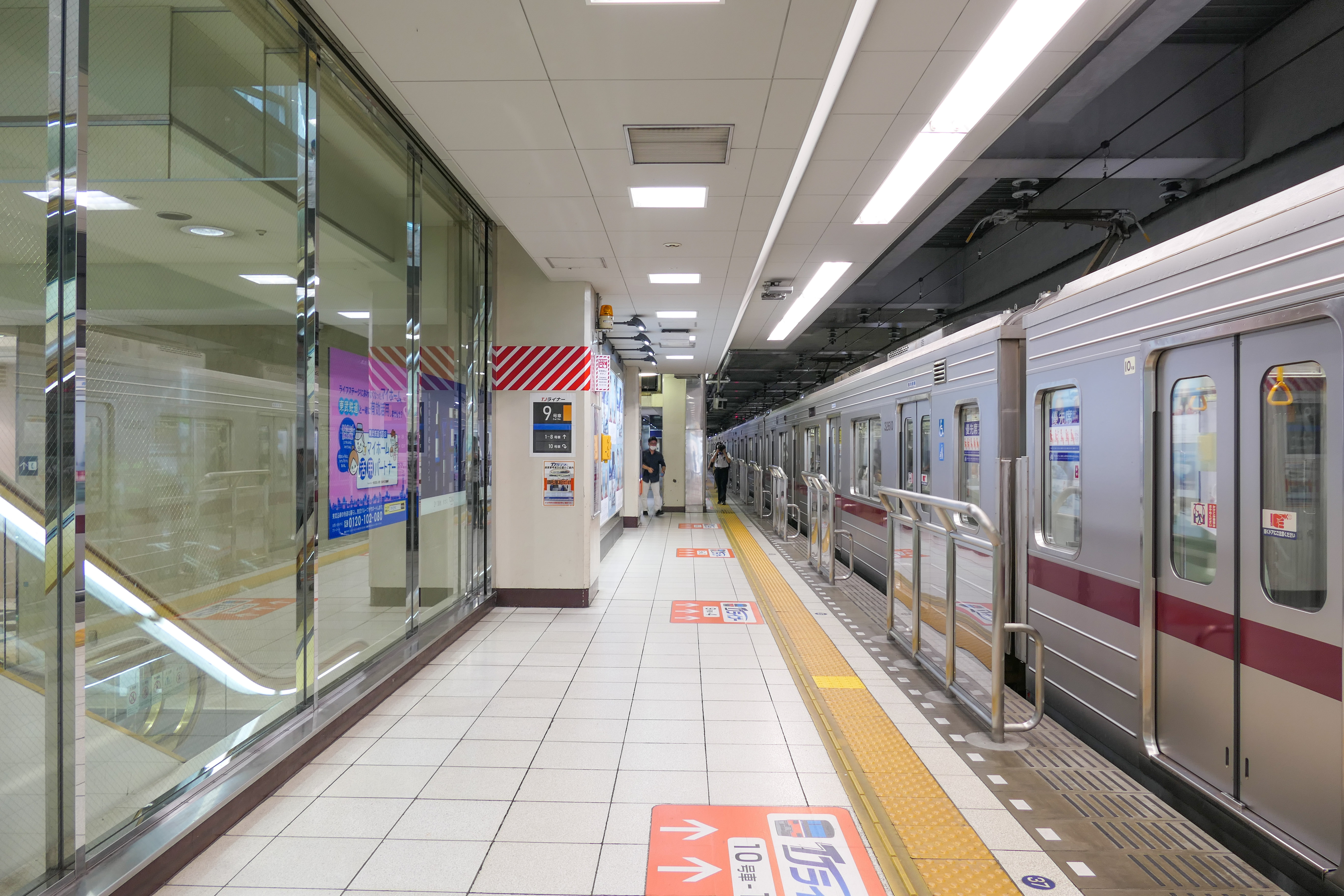
Platform 5 in July 2021

Chest-high platform edge doors were scheduled to be added by the end of fiscal 2020. Platform doors protecting platform 1 are in use since 21 April 2018. It was planned to have platform doors protecting platforms 2 and 3 in operation from 2 March 2019.

==== Ticket barriers ====
There are three sets of ticket barriers giving access to the platforms: the "South Gate" at ground level (signposted in red), and the "Central Gate" (signposted in blue) and "North Gate" (signposted in green) on the first basement level.

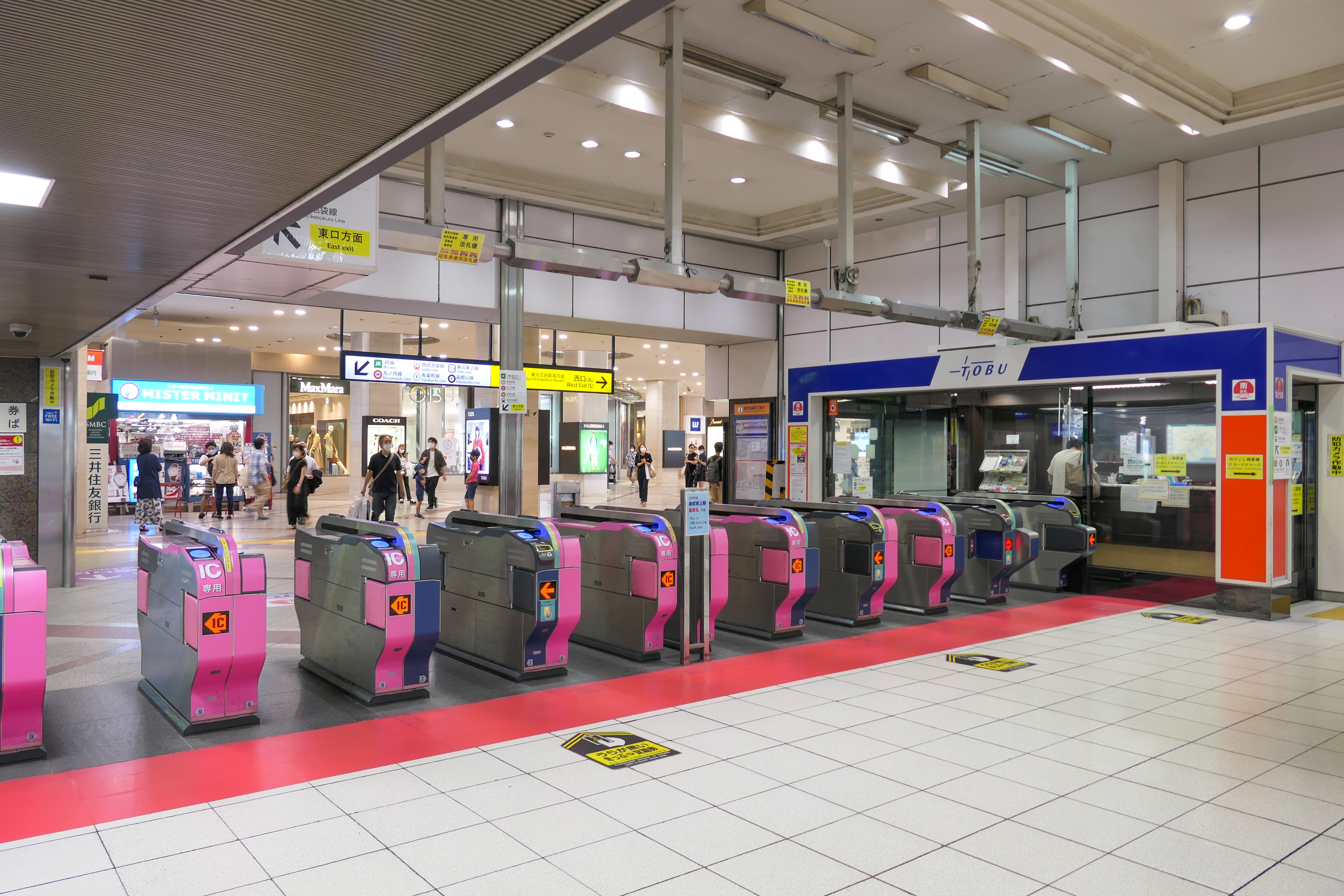
The ground-level south entrance and ticket barriers in July 2021

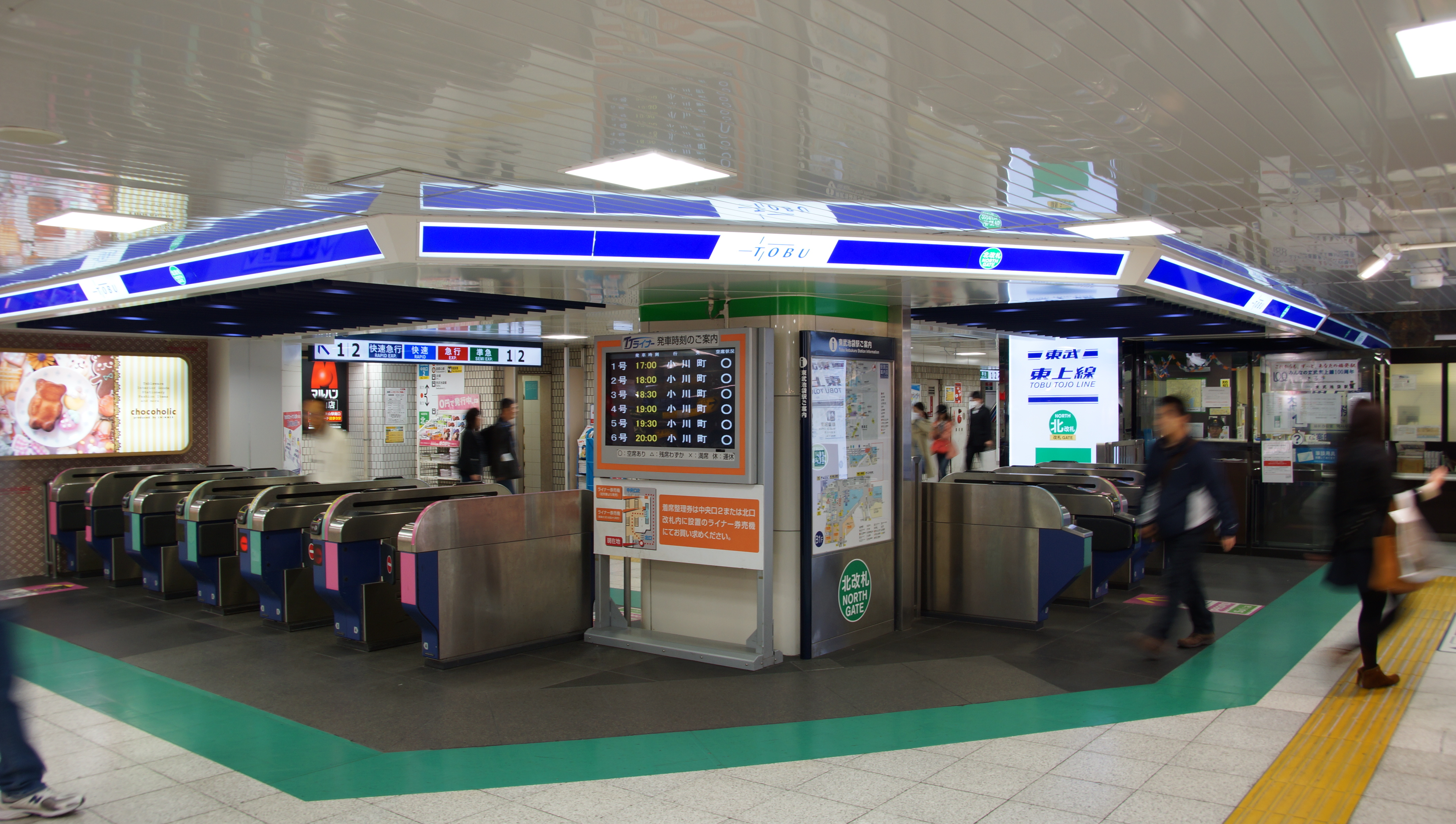
The north gate ticket barriers in April 2014

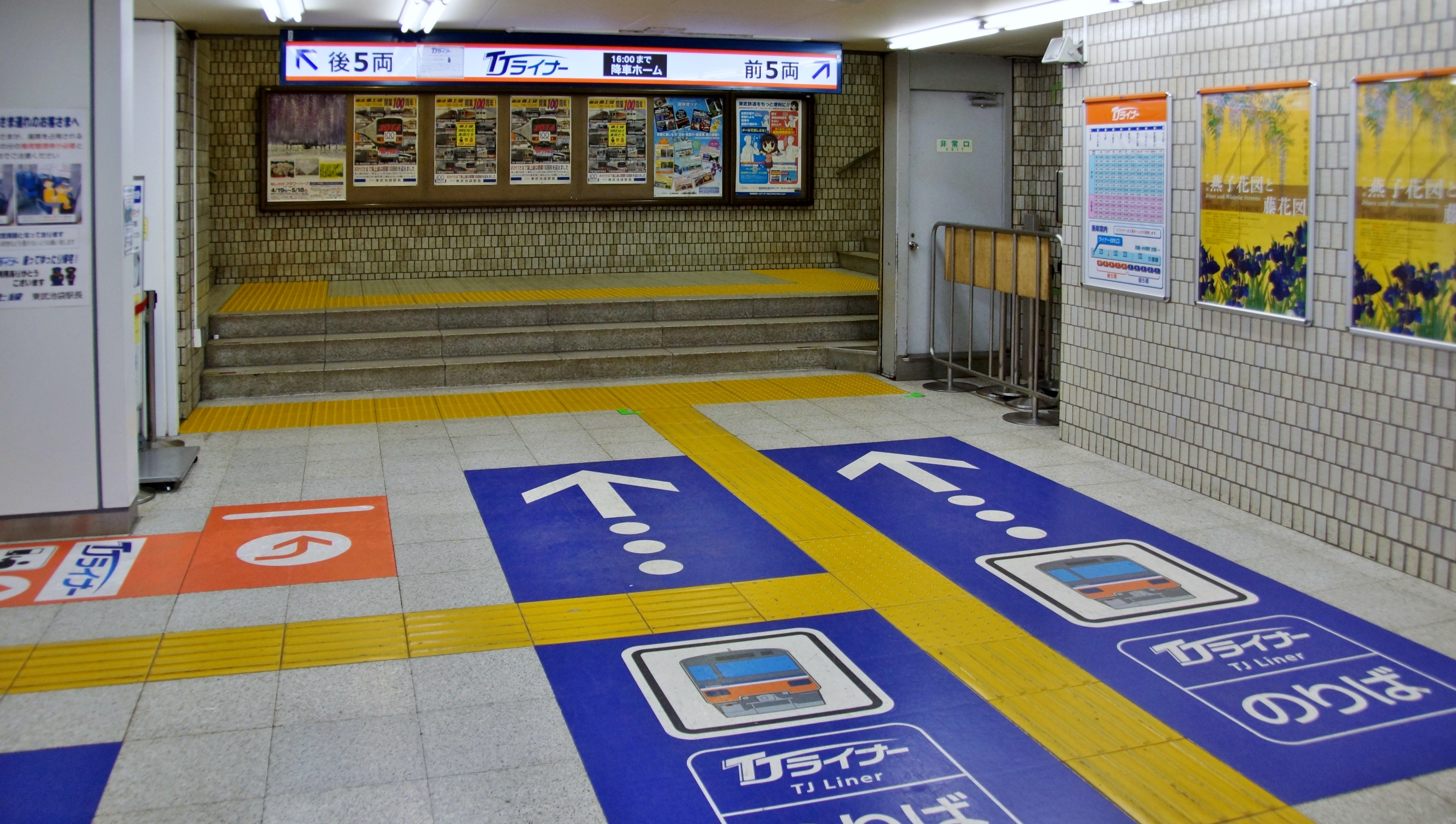
The stairs leading from the central gate to platform 5 for TJ Liner passengers in April 2014

=== Seibu Railway ===
SI01 Ikebukuro Station 池袋駅
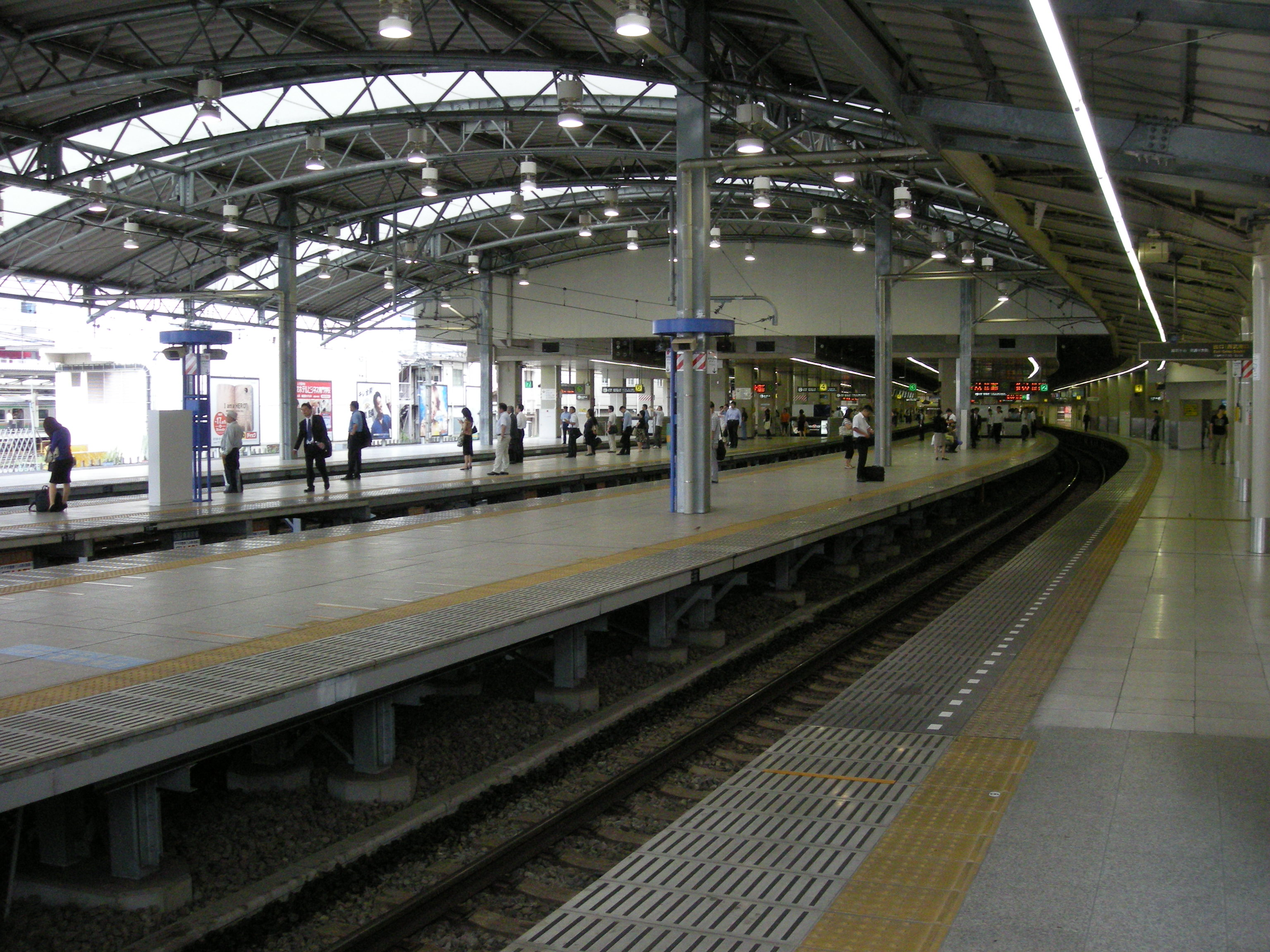
- The Seibu Ikebukuro Line platform in September 2007

General information
- Location: 1-28-1 Minamiikebukuro, Toshima-ku, Tokyo; Japan
- System: Seibu station
- Operator: Seibu Railway
- Line: Seibu Ikebukuro Line
- Tracks: 4

Construction
- Structure type: Ground level
- Accessible: Yes

Other information
- Station code: SI-01

History
- Opened: 1915

Passengers
- FY2024: 428,121 (daily)
Services
Preceding station	Seibu Railway	Following station
Tokorozawa SI17 towards Seibu-Chichibu	Chichibu	Terminus
Tokorozawa SI17 towards Hannō	Musashi	Terminus
Shakujii-kōen One-way operation	Ikebukuro Line Rapid Express	Terminus
Shakujii-kōen SI10 towards Hannō	Ikebukuro Line Express	Terminus
Shakujii-kōen One-way operation	Ikebukuro Line Commuter Express	Terminus
Nerima SI06 towards Hannō	Ikebukuro Line Rapid	Terminus
Nerima One-way operation	Ikebukuro Line Commuter Semi Express	Terminus
Nerima SI06 towards Hannō	Ikebukuro Line Semi Express	Terminus
Shiinamachi SI02 towards Agano	Ikebukuro Line Local	Terminus
Location

1-7	Seibu Ikebukuro Line	for Nerima, Tokorozawa, and Hannō

Platforms 1, 4, and 6 are normally used for disembarking passengers only.

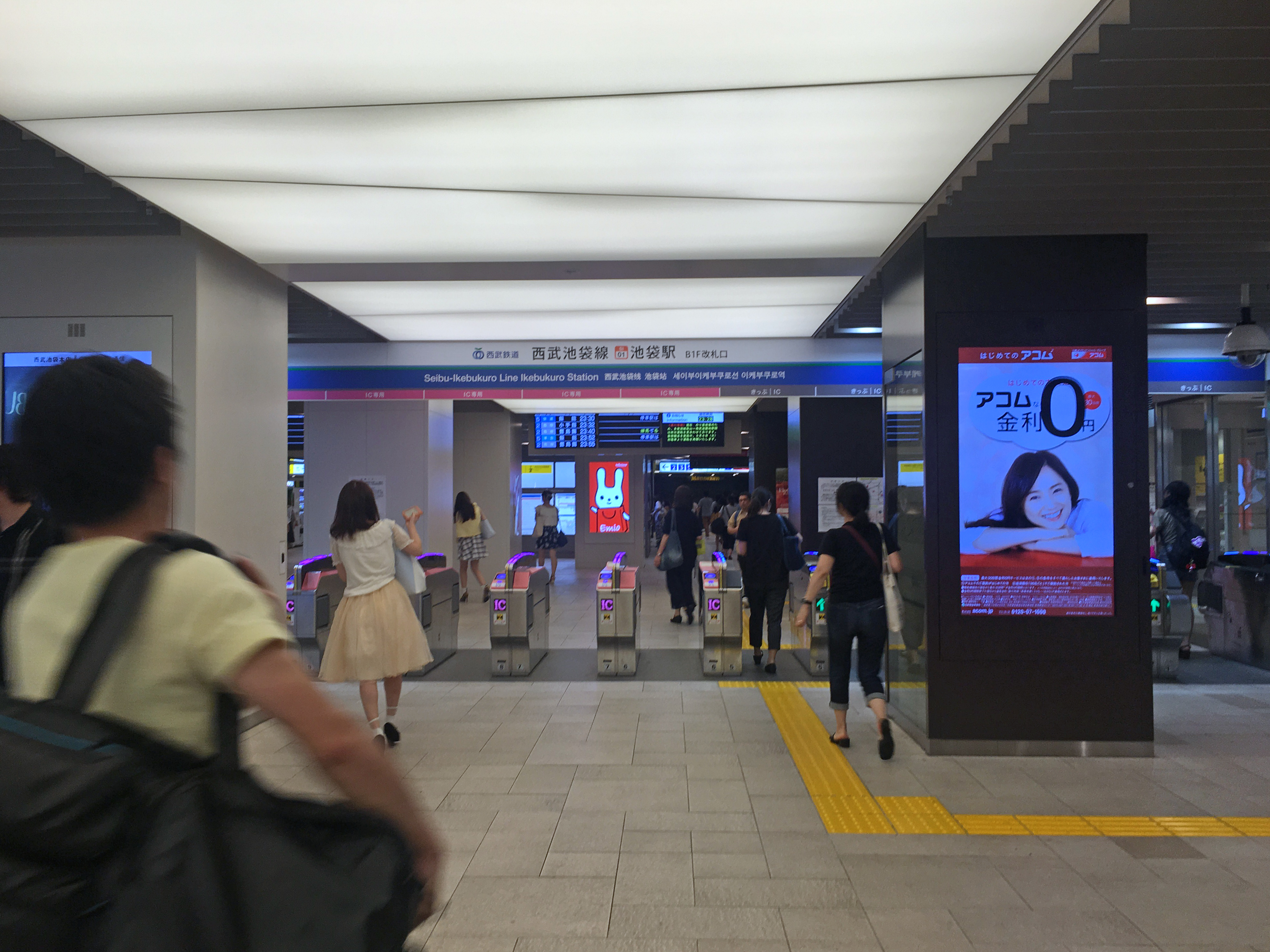
The basement entrance and ticket barriers in 2016

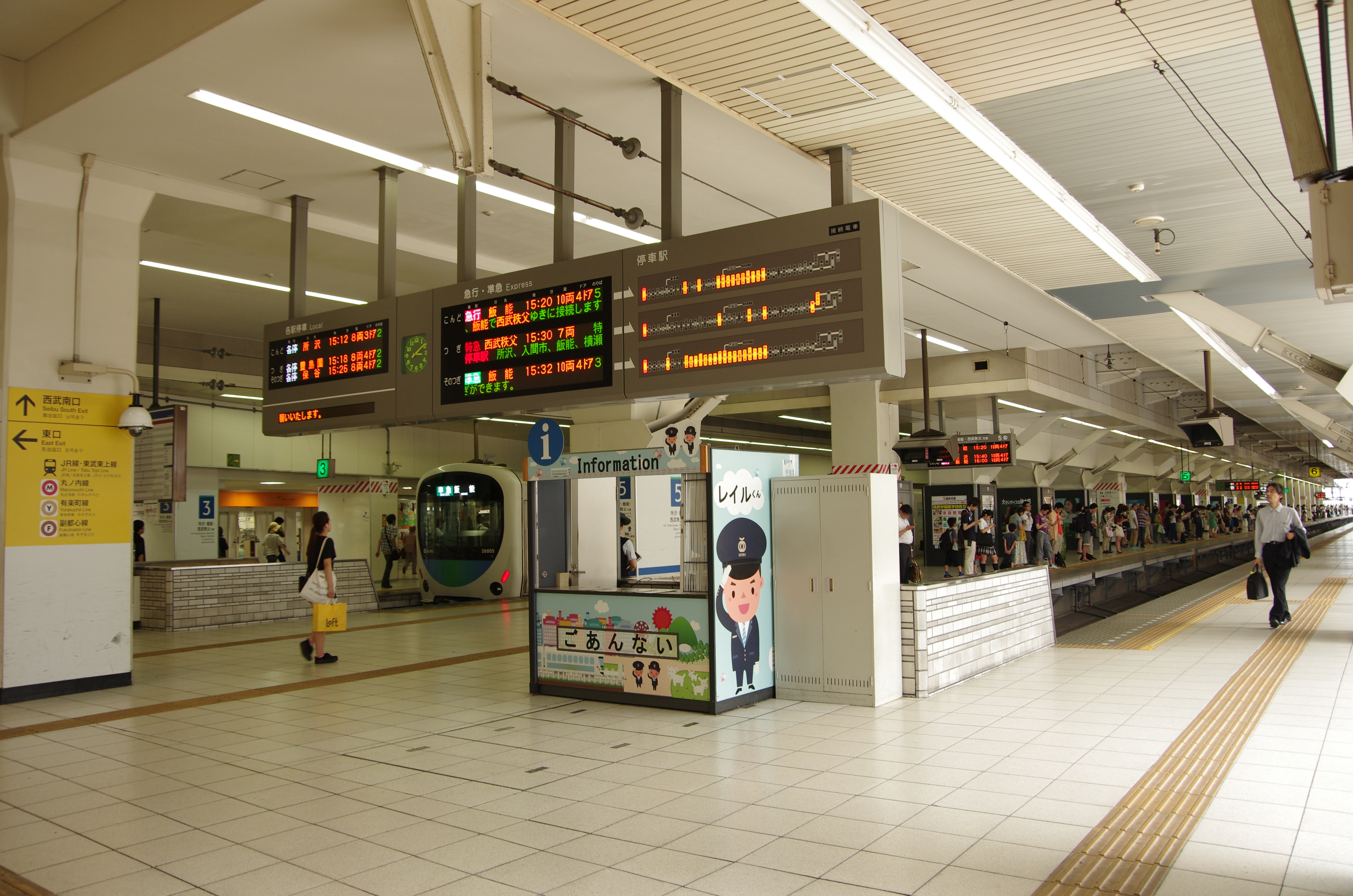
The Seibu Ikebukuro Line platforms in July 2014

Seibu track and platform layout

=== Tokyo Metro ===
==== Platform ====
Ikebukuro Station 池袋駅

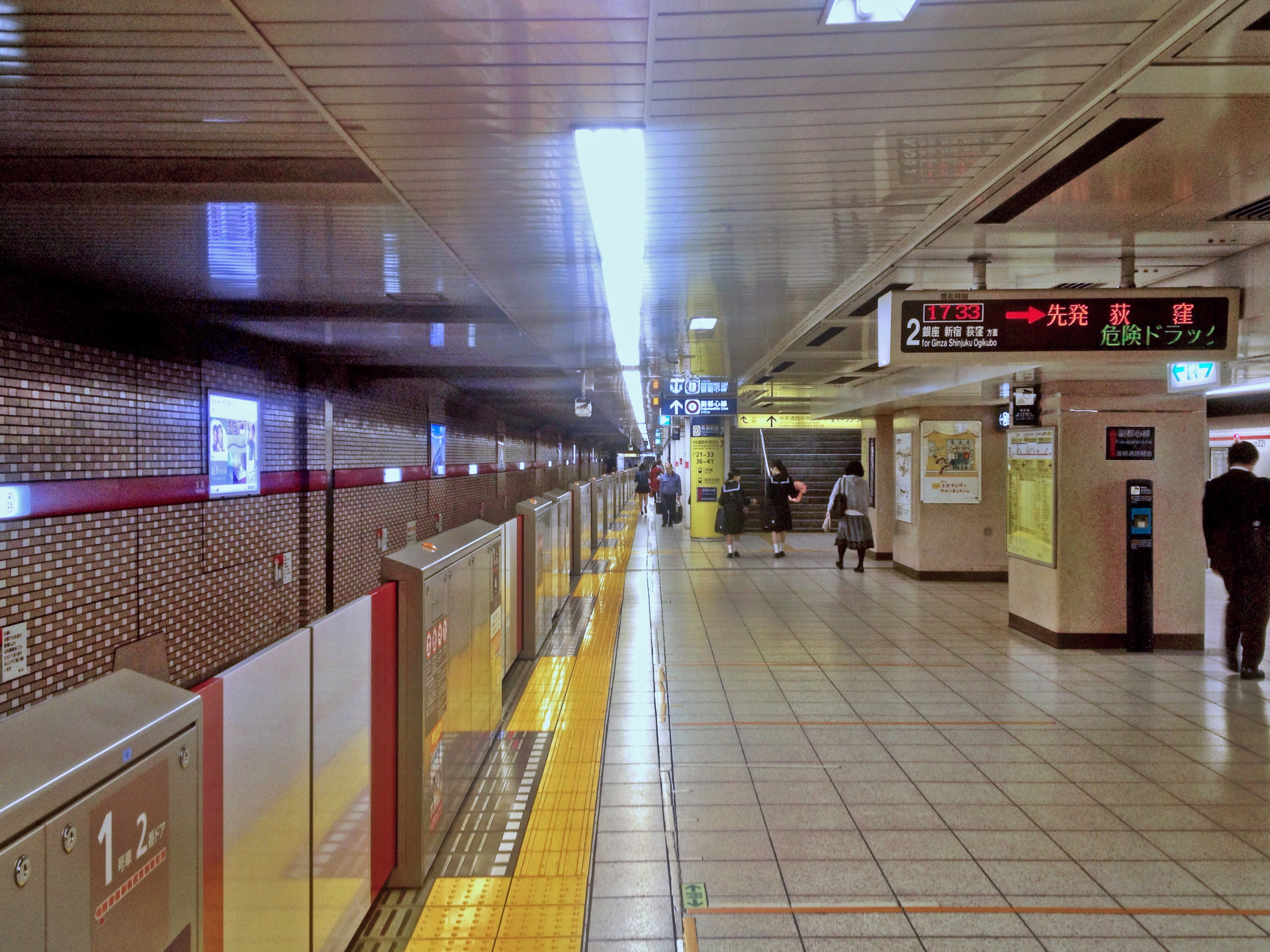
- The Marunouchi Line platform in April 2015

General information
- Location: 3-28-1 Minamiikebukuro, Toshima-ku (Marunouchi Line); 1-12-1 Nishiikebukuro, Toshima-ku (Yurakucho Line); 3-28-14 Nishiikebukuro, Toshima-ku (Fukutoshin Line); Japan
- System: Tokyo Metro station
- Operator: Tokyo Metro
- Lines: Marunouchi Line; Yūrakuchō Line; Fukutoshin Line
- Platforms: 3 island platforms
- Tracks: 6

Construction
- Structure type: Underground
- Accessible: Yes

Other information
- Station code: M25, Y09, F09

History
- Opened: 20 January 1954; 72 years ago

Passengers
- FY2024: 518,135 (daily)
Services
Preceding station	Tokyo Metro	Following station
Shin-otsuka towards Ogikubo or Hōnanchō	Marunouchi Line	Terminus
Kanamecho towards Wakoshi	Yūrakuchō Line Local	Higashi-ikebukuro towards Shin-kiba
Shakujii-kōen SI10 towards Seibu-Chichibu	S-Train Weekends (Weekends and national holidays)	Shinjuku-sanchome towards Motomachi-Chūkagai
Kotake-mukaihara towards Hannō or Ogawamachi	F Liner	Shinjuku-sanchome towards Motomachi-Chūkagai
Kotake-mukaihara towards Wakoshi	Fukutoshin Line Express Commuter Express	Shinjuku-sanchome towards Shibuya
Kanamecho towards Wakoshi	Fukutoshin Line Local	Zoshigaya towards Shibuya
Location

This station consists of three separate island platforms for the Marunouchi Line, Yurakucho Line, and Fukutoshin Line.

==== Station layout ====
1-2
Marunouchi Line
for Otemachi, Tokyo, Ginza, Shinjuku, Ogikubo, and Honancho
3
Yūrakuchō Line
for Iidabashi, Nagatacho, Yurakucho, and Shin-kiba
4
Yūrakuchō Line
for Kotake-mukaihara and Wakoshi
Tobu Tojo Line for Shinrinkōen
Seibu Ikebukuro Line for Hannō
5
Fukutoshin Line
- for Shinjuku-sanchome, Meiji-jingumae 'Harajuku', and Shibuya
- Tōyoko Line for Yokohama
- Minatomirai Line for Motomachi-Chukagai
- Sōtetsu Izumino Line for Shōnandai via Shin-yokohama Line
6
Fukutoshin Line
for Kotake-mukaihara and Wakoshi
Tobu Tojo Line for Shinrinkōen
Seibu Ikebukuro Line for Hannō

The Tokyo Metro platforms are equipped with chest-height platform edge doors.

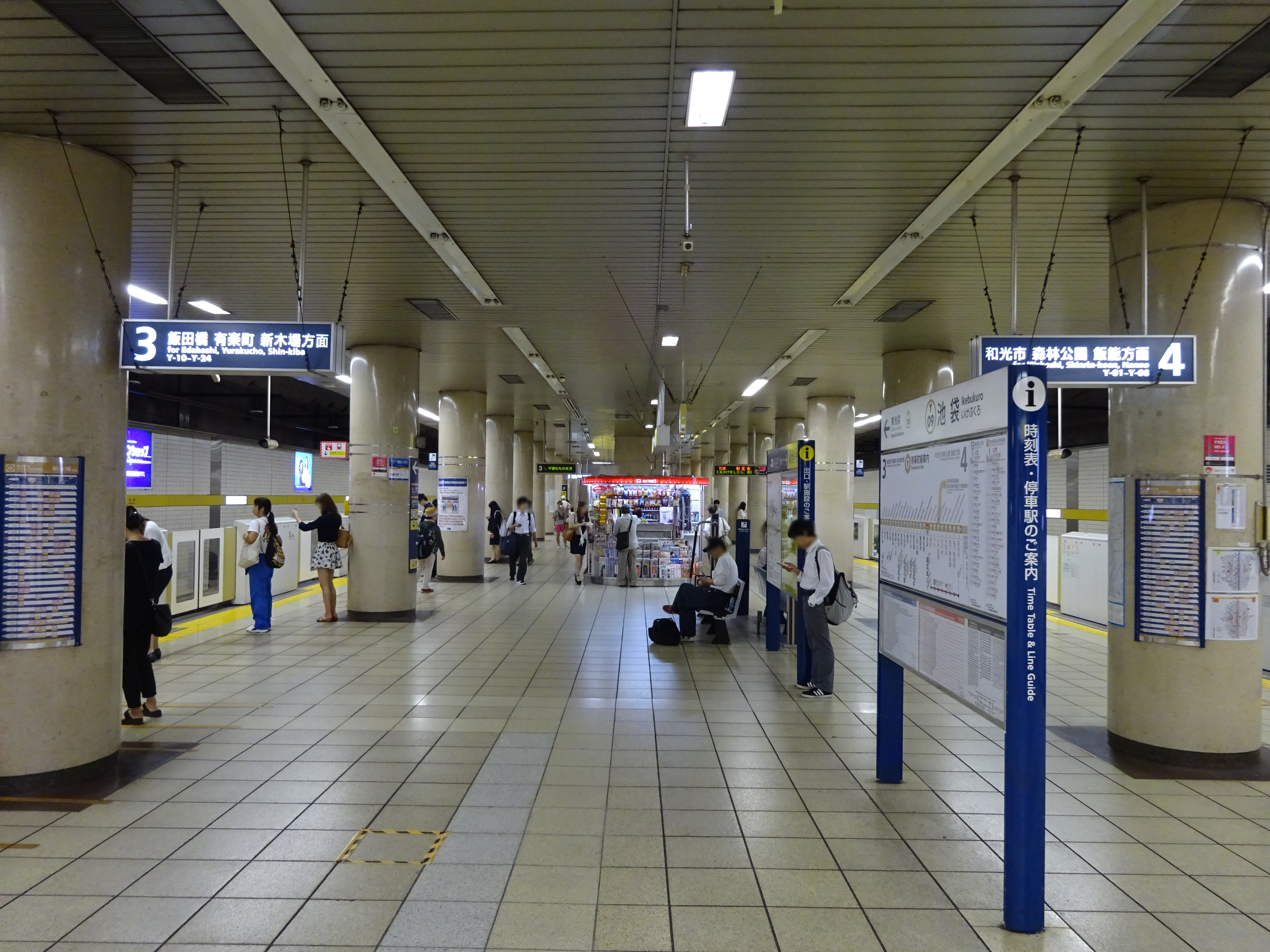
The Yurakucho Line platforms in June 2016

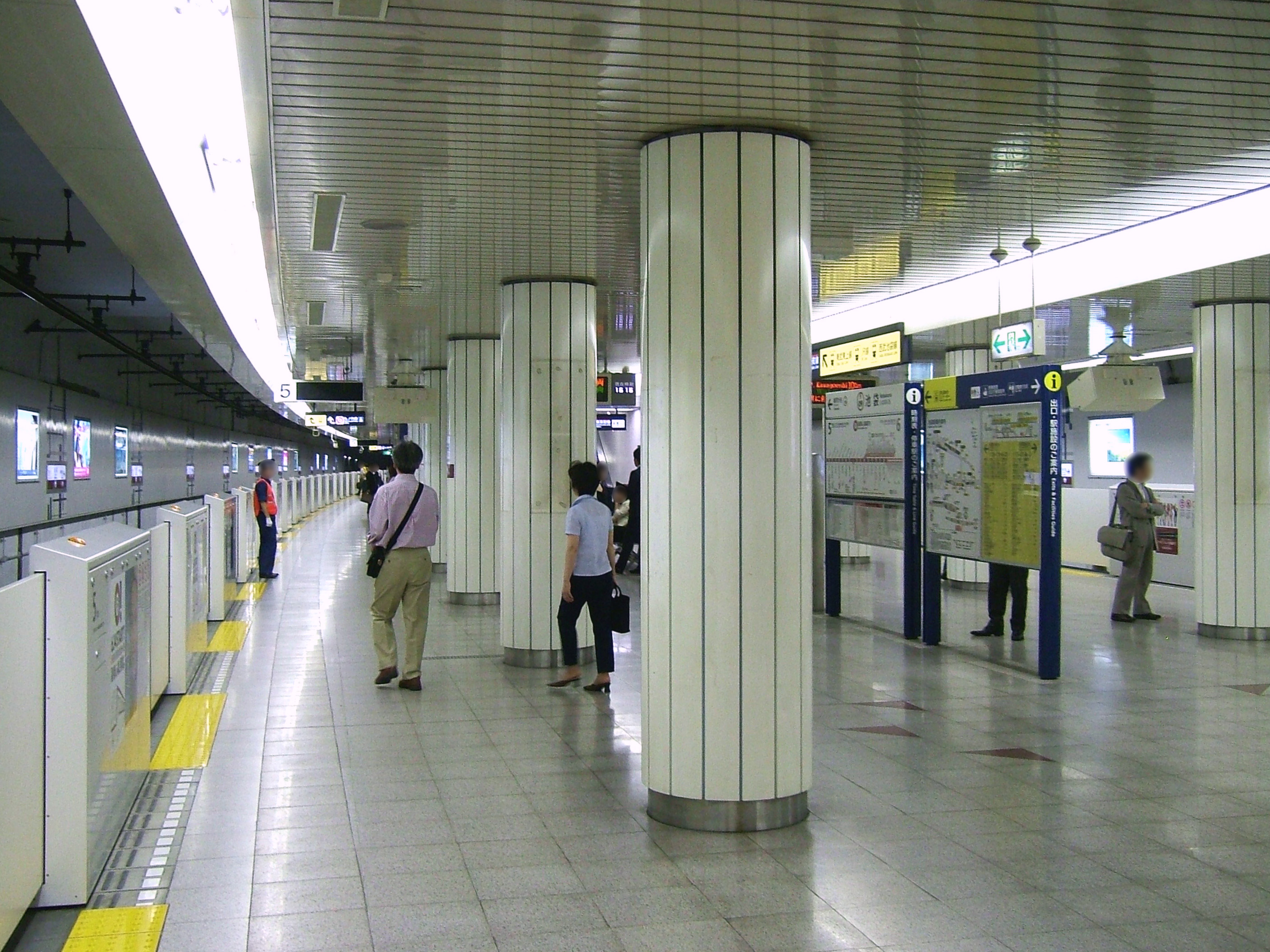
The Fukutoshin Line platforms in June 2008

== History ==
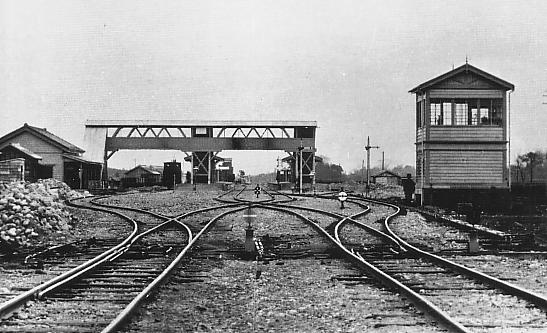
JGR Ikebukuro Station in the early 20th century

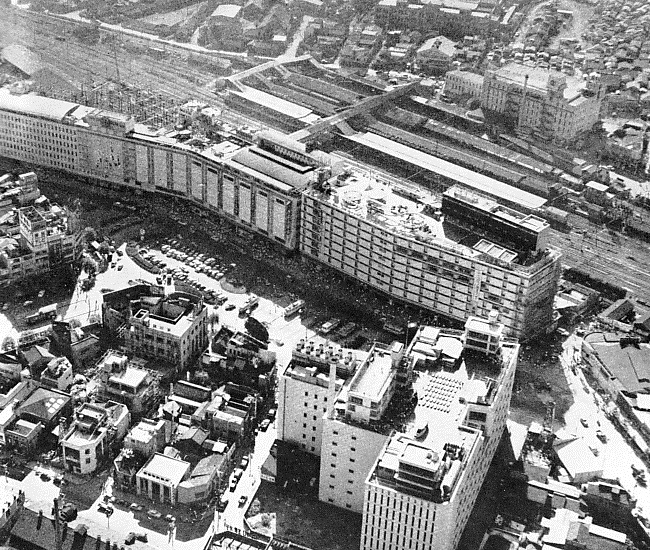
Ikebukuro Station in the early 1960s

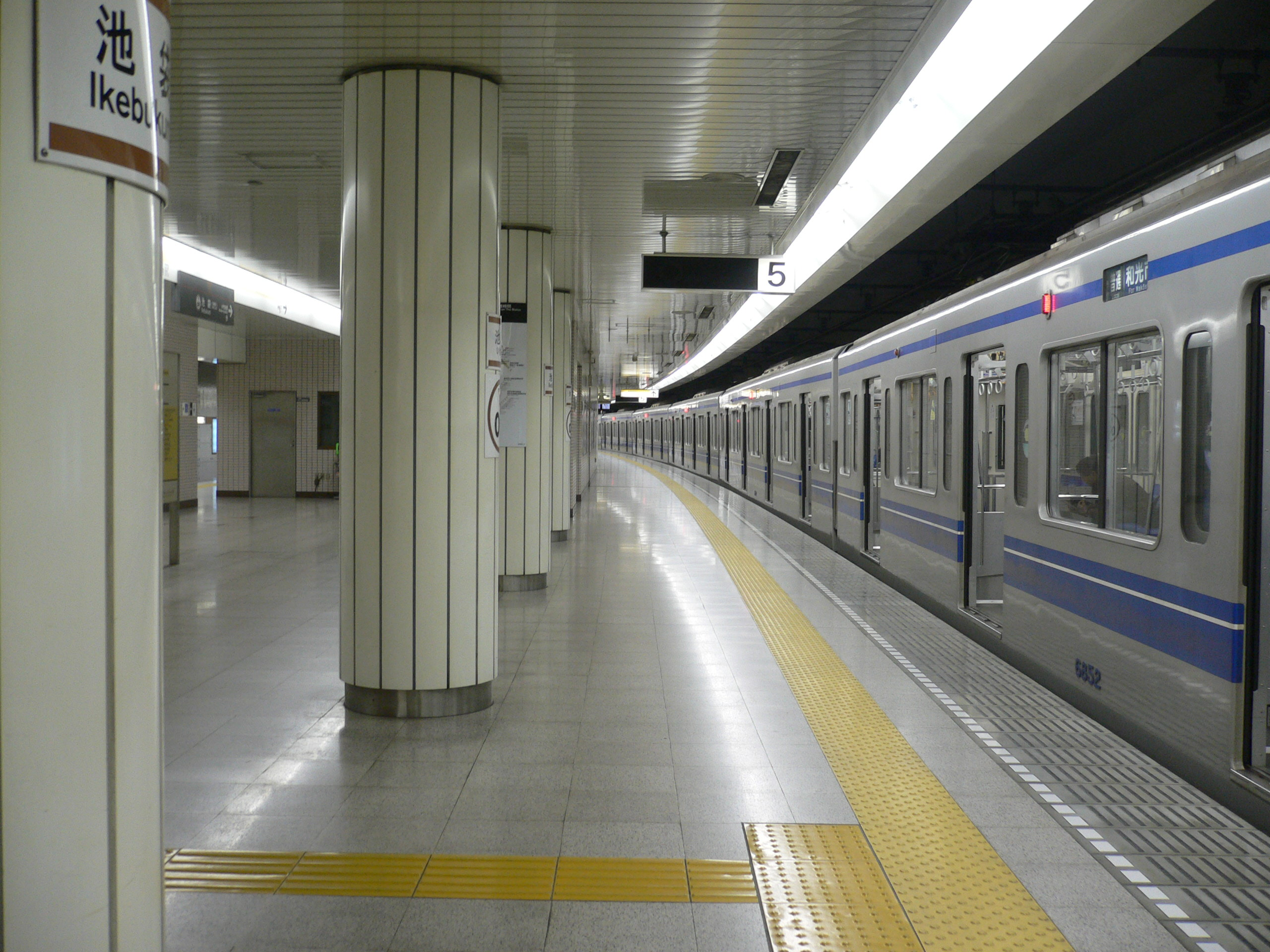
The underground "Shinsen Ikebukuro" platforms in 2005 before they became part of the Tokyo Metro Fukutoshin Line

The station was opened on 1 April 1903 by the Japanese Government Railways (JGR). The Tōjō Railway Line (present-day Tobu Tojo Line) station opened on 1 May 1914 with the opening of the 33.5 km (20.8 mi) line to Tanomosawa (田面沢駅) in Saitama Prefecture (located between the present stations of Kawagoeshi and Kasumigaseki). As the Tokyo terminus of the line was originally planned to be at Shimo-Itabashi, Ikebukuro Station is to this day marked by km post "-1.9" (the distance from Shimo-Itabashi Station where the "0 km" post for the line is located).

Tobu opened a department store adjoining its station on 29 May 1962. Around the same time, the Tobu station platforms were expanded with three tracks.

In March 1992, automatic ticket barriers were installed at the north exit of the Tobu Station, and in June of the same year, the Tobu Department Store was expanded with the addition of the Metropolitan Plaza annex located on the south side.

The station facilities of the Marunouchi and Yurakucho Lines were inherited by Tokyo Metro after the privatization of the Teito Rapid Transit Authority (TRTA) in 2004.

In June 2008, the Tobu station ticket barriers were color-coded into three "zones": North, Central, and South.

Chest-height platform edge doors were installed on the Tokyo Metro Yurakucho Line platforms in January 2011.

Station numbering was introduced to the JR platforms in 2016 with Ikebukuro being assigned station numbers JY13 for the Yamanote Line, JA12 for the Saikyo Line, and JS21 for the Shonan-Shinjuku Line.

On 1 March 2024, the departure melody on both Yamanote Line platforms was changed to the theme song of Bic Camera. The company has its head office and a major store building in the area.

== Passenger statistics ==
The figures below are the official number of passengers entering and exiting each day released by each train operator.

Operator	Number	Fiscal year	Note
JR East	550,350	2013	Boarding passengers only. Second busiest JR East station.
Tobu	472,132	2014	Busiest Tobu station.
Seibu	484,446	2013	Busiest Seibu station.
Tokyo Metro	523,834	2013	Busiest Tokyo Metro station. (excludes stations which allow through services onto non-Tokyo Metro lines)

Annual passenger figures for the station between fiscal 1903 and 1965 are as shown below. Note that the figures only consider boarding passengers and a blank indicates that no data is available.

Fiscal year	Annual total				References
Fiscal year	JGR/JNR	Tobu	Musashino/Seibu	TRTA	References
1903	27,941	Not in operation	Not in operation	Not in operation	
1905	33,877	Not in operation	Not in operation	Not in operation	
1915	545,473			Not in operation	
1925	6,842,992	192,380	1,228,881	Not in operation	
1935	11,554,661	500,476	3,558,958	Not in operation	
1955	34,428,803				
1965	144,996,156	72,559,157	77,873,226	55,093,466	

Source: Tokyo Metropolitan Government

- JR East
- Marunouchi Line
- Yurakucho Line
- Tobu Tojo Line
- Seibu Ikebukuro Line

The daily passenger figures for the JR East, Seibu, Tobu, and Tokyo Metro station after fiscal 2000 are as shown below. Note that the JR East figures only consider boarding passengers whereas the Seibu, Tobu, and Tokyo Metro figures consider both entering and exiting passengers.

Fiscal year	JR East	Seibu	Tobu	Tokyo Metro
2000	570,255			
2005	564,669	511,078		
2010	544,222	476,989	467,770	
2011	544,762	472,022	464,908	470,284
2012	550,756	479,467	471,990	483,952
2013	550,350	484,446	476,756	523,834
2014	549,503		472,132	

- JR East
- Marunouchi Line
- Yurakucho Line
- Fukutoshin Line
- Tobu Tojo Line
- Seibu Ikebukuro Line

== Surrounding area ==
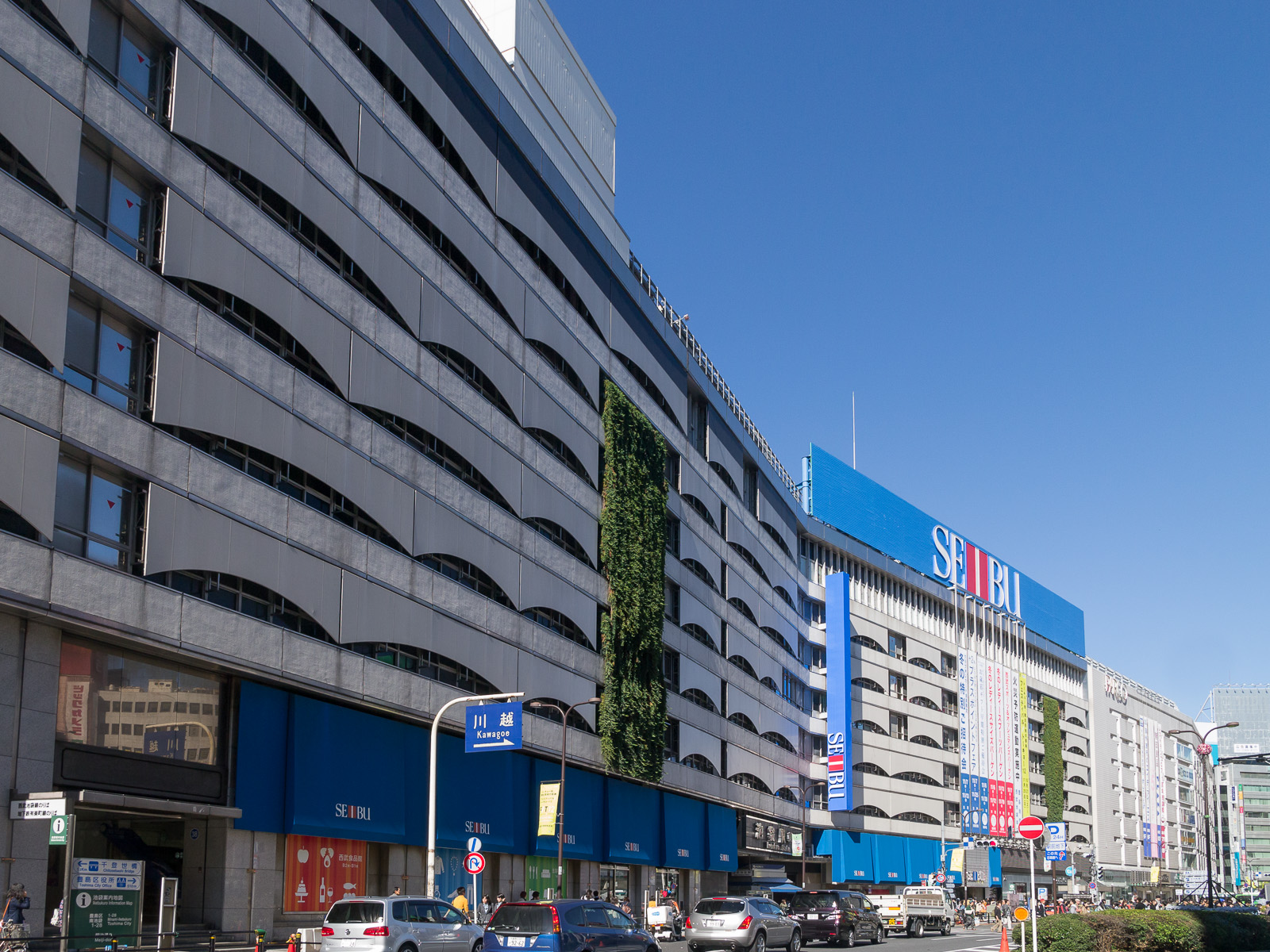
The east side of the station and Seibu Department Store building, November 2012

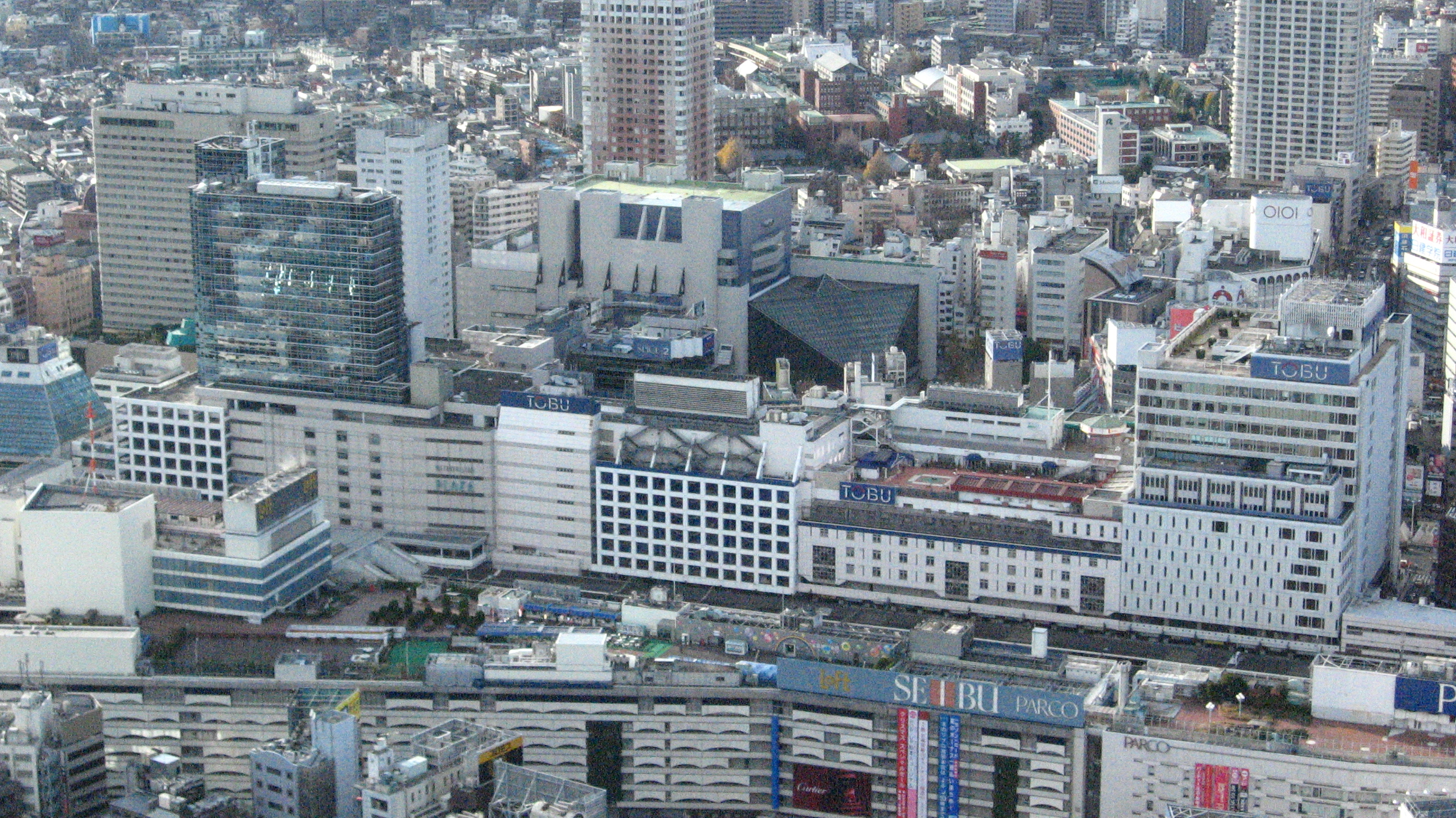
The west side of the station and Tobu Department Store building, December 2007

The surrounding Ikebukuro district is a major commercial center. The Seibu department store, Sunshine City, Parco, and Bic Camera are located to the east of the station, while the Tobu department store and Metropolitan Plaza are located to the west.

=== Schools ===
- Rikkyo University
- Tokyo College of Music
- Teikyo Heisei University (Ikebukuro Campus)
- Tokyo International University (Ikebukuro Campus)
- Tokyo University of Social Welfare (Ikebukuro Campus)
- Shukutoku University (Ikebukuro Satellite Campus)
- Tokyo College of Transport Studies
- Toshimagaoka-joshigakuen Junior and Senior High School

=== Retail ===
- Seibu Department Store
- Parco Department Store
- Tobu Department Store
- Bic Camera
- Yamada Denki
- Sunshine City

=== Hotels ===
- Hotel Metropolitan
- Centurion hotel Ikebukuro

=== Civic ===
- Toshima Tax Office
- Toshima Civic Centre
- Tokyo Metropolitan Theatre
- Ikebukuro Library
- Ikebukuro Fire Station

=== Other stations ===
- Higashi-Ikebukuro Station, on the Tokyo Metro Yurakucho Line

== See also ==
- List of East Japan Railway Company stations
- List of railway stations in Japan
- Transportation in Greater Tokyo
