= Kanamechō Station =

Metro station in Tokyo, Japan

Coordinates: 35°43′59.5164″N 139°41′56.3784″E

Kanamecho Station 要町駅

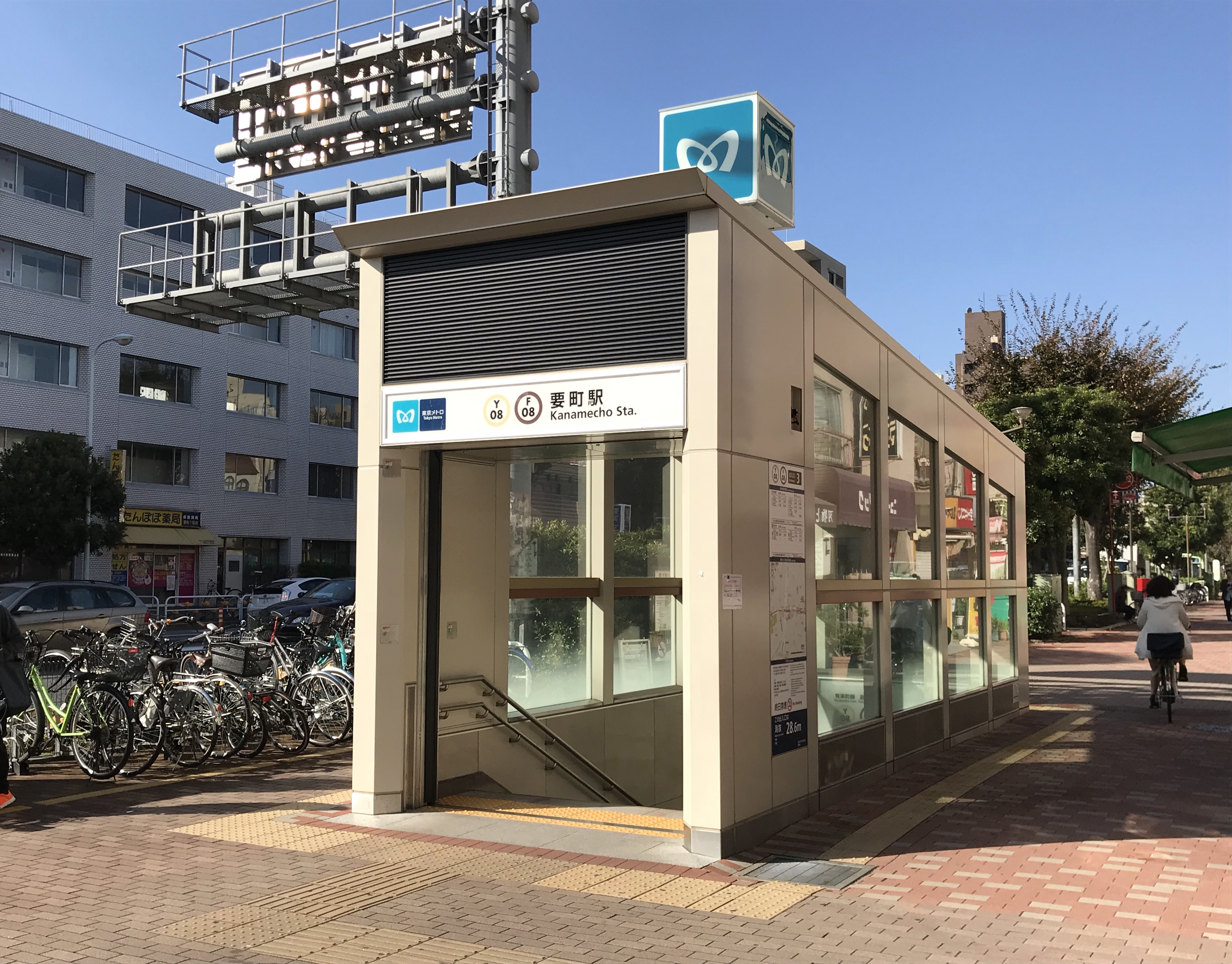
- Exit3 in November 2018

General information
- Location: 1-10 Kanamecho, Toshima, Tokyo; Japan
- System: Tokyo Metro station
- Operator: Tokyo Metro
- Lines: Yūrakuchō Line; Fukutoshin Line
- Platforms: 2 island platforms (1 for each line)
- Tracks: 4 (2 for each line)

Construction
- Structure type: Underground

Other information
- Station code: F-08, Y-08

History
- Opened: 24 June 1983; 43 years ago

Passengers
- 2015: 38,475 daily

Services
Preceding station	Tokyo Metro	Following station
Senkawa towards Wakoshi	Yūrakuchō Line	Ikebukuro towards Shin-kiba
Senkawa towards Wakoshi	Fukutoshin Line Local	Ikebukuro towards Shibuya
Location
- Location within Tokyo Yamanote Loop Location within Tokyo wards area Location within Japan

Kanamecho Station (要町駅, Kanamechō-eki) is a subway station in Toshima, Tokyo, Japan, operated by the Tokyo subway operator Tokyo Metro.

== Lines ==
Kanamechō Station is served by the Tokyo Metro Yurakucho Line (station number "Y-08") and the Tokyo Metro Fukutoshin Line (station number "F-08").

== Station layout ==
The station consists of two island platforms on different levels. The Yurakucho Line platform (tracks 1 and 2) is located on the second basement ("B2F") level, while the Fukutoshin Line platform (tracks 3 and 4) is located on the third basement ("B3F") level. The platforms are equipped with waist-height platform edge doors.

=== Platforms ===
1
Yūrakuchō Line
for Ikebukuro, Yūrakuchō, and Shin-Kiba
2
Yūrakuchō Line
for Wakōshi
Tobu Tojo Line for Shiki, Kawagoeshi, and Shinrinkōen
3
Fukutoshin Line
- for Ikebukuro, Shinjuku-sanchōme, and Shibuya
- Tōyoko Line for Yokohama
- Minatomirai Line for Motomachi-Chukagai
- Sōtetsu Izumino Line for Shōnandai via Shin-yokohama Line
4
Fukutoshin Line
for Wakōshi
Tobu Tojo Line for Shiki, Kawagoeshi, and Shinrinkōen

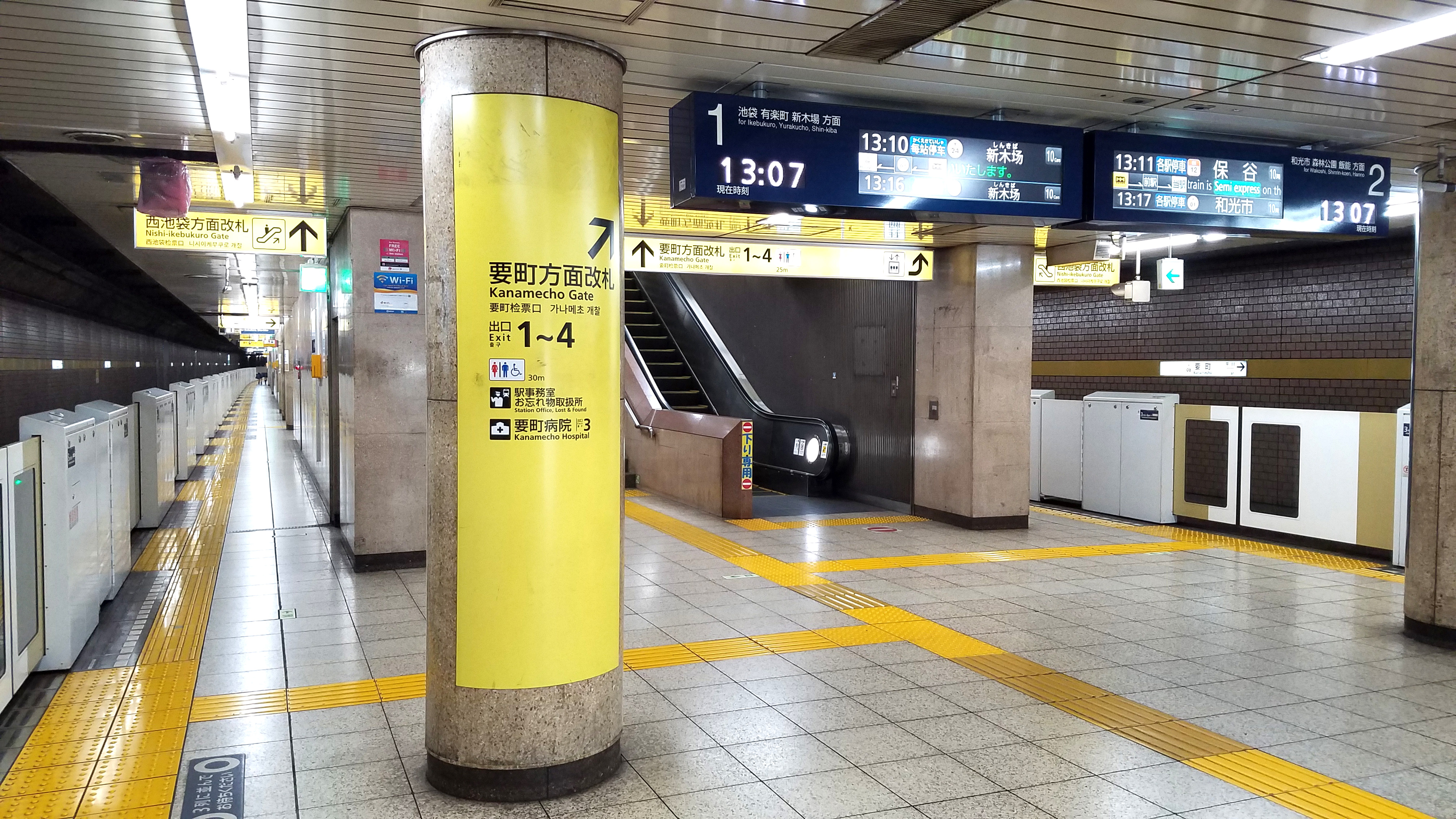
Yurakucho Line platform

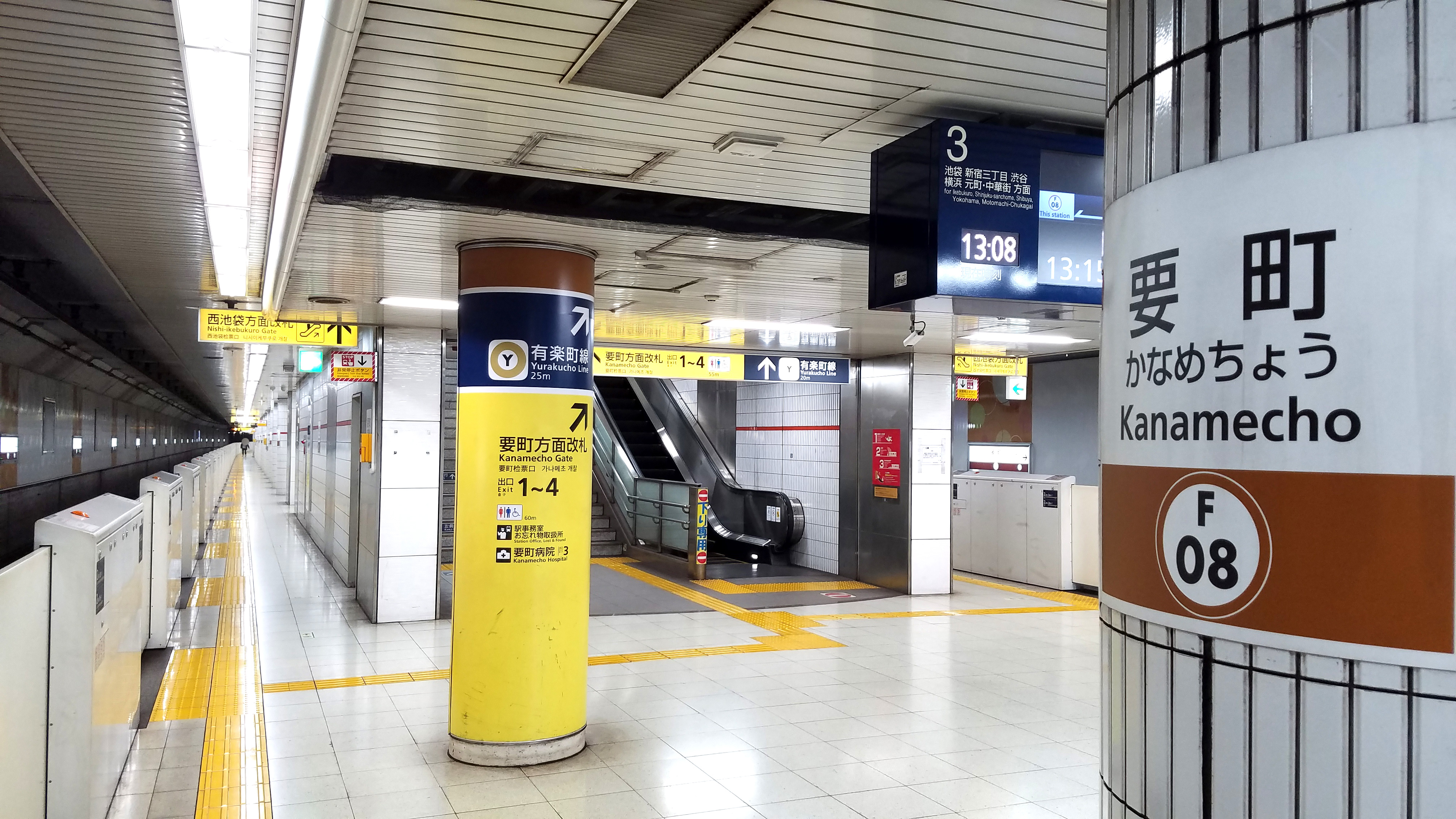
Fukutoshin Line platform

== History ==
The station opened on 24 June 1983, serving the Tokyo Metro Yurakucho Line. The Tokyo Metro Fukutoshin Line also started operating through this station on 14 June 2008.

The station facilities were inherited by Tokyo Metro after the privatization of the Teito Rapid Transit Authority (TRTA) in 2004.

Waist-height platform edge doors were installed in January 2011.
