= Asian Pacific Development Center =

Non-profit organization in Colorado, U.S.

- Formation: 1980; 46 years ago
- Founded at: Denver, Colorado, US
- Headquarters: 1537 Alton St.
- Location: Aurora, Colorado, US
- Coordinates: 39°44′28″N 104°52′57″W
- Official language: 35 languages
- Website: www.apdc.org

The Asian Pacific Development Center is a non-profit organization assisting Asian immigrants in the Denver, Colorado, metropolitan area. Founded in 1980 to provide outpatient mental health therapy and counseling, it expanded its offerings a few years later to include acclimation assistance including classes in English as a second language, job placement, and youth activities. The center provides interpreters and translation services in courts, hospitals, and businesses as well. Services are available in 35 different languages.

== History ==
The Asian Pacific Development Center was founded in October 1980. Large numbers of Asian refugees had emigrated to Colorado following the Vietnam War, and a significant number were showing signs of posttraumatic stress disorder and depression. The center was formed by leaders of the city's Asian American and Pacific Islander communities, including "social workers, attorneys, psychologists and psychiatrists living in Denver", and services were provided by these professionals.

In the 21st century, the center's clientele expanded as additional groups of refugees landed in Colorado, including immigrants from Korea (estimated at 25,000 in the Denver area in 2000) and Bhutan (estimated at 3,500 in 2008).

The center initially offered mental health therapy and counseling on an outpatient basis. After Sumiko Hennessy, a Japanese-born professor of social work, became executive director in 1984, the center's services were expanded to help "overcome the Asian discomfort with mental health assistance". Classes in English as a second language, employment counseling, and youth activities were introduced at this time.

== Services ==
The center offers services geared to youth, teens, and adults/seniors. After-school programs for youth include life skills workshops, tutoring, mentoring, and leadership training. Teens are assisted with placement in summer internships in corporate environments. The adults and seniors component reflects the center's initial founding as a mental health clinic, providing "psychological and psychiatric evaluation, medication therapy, individual and family therapy, day treatment, counseling for domestic abuse perpetrators, and alcohol-abuse education and therapy". Employment counseling and job placement are also provided.

The center responds to community needs as they arise. In 1985, staff addressed the problem faced by mail-order brides in the Asian American community. Asian girls and women, primarily from the Philippines, had been photographed in suggestive poses and advertised in American men's magazines. The women, hoping to marry good husbands, were often abused by the men who chose them. The Asian Pacific Development Center sought to ameliorate the problem by opening support groups and counseling services for the maltreated wives, and furnished referrals to women's shelters.

In 2017, the center sought to assist immigrant and refugee artists in Aurora to establish businesses, offering "free mentoring, marketing and portfolio workshops". In 2018, the center opened a small garden adjacent to its facility to service new immigrants who had been used to farming and a more active lifestyle in their native lands and now felt "depressed and isolated".

In 2018, the center was awarded a $980,000 grant in conjunction with the Denver District Attorney's office to provide services to victims of human trafficking.

== Staff ==
As of 1998, the center had a staff of 73 assisting approximately 2,500 clients in the Denver metropolitan area. Counselors communicate with clients in 21 languages, while interpreters expand that reach to 35 languages. The interpreters are also available to translate on behalf of clients in courts, hospitals, and businesses.

Japanese-American professor Sumiko Hennessy served as executive director of the center from 1984 to 2000.

== Location ==
After a series of moves, the center entered its current home at 1537 Alton St. in Aurora in 2013.

== Awards ==
In 1998 the center received the Community Health Leadership Award from the Robert Wood Johnson Foundation; the $100,000 cash prize was used to fund relocation to a larger facility.

== Sources ==
- Varnell, Jeanne (1999). Women of Consequence: The Colorado Women's Hall of Fame. Big Earth Publishing. ISBN 1555662145.
