= Tokyo University of Social Welfare Junior College =

Coordinates: 36°17′12.5″N 139°11′35.2″E

- 東京福祉大学短期大学部
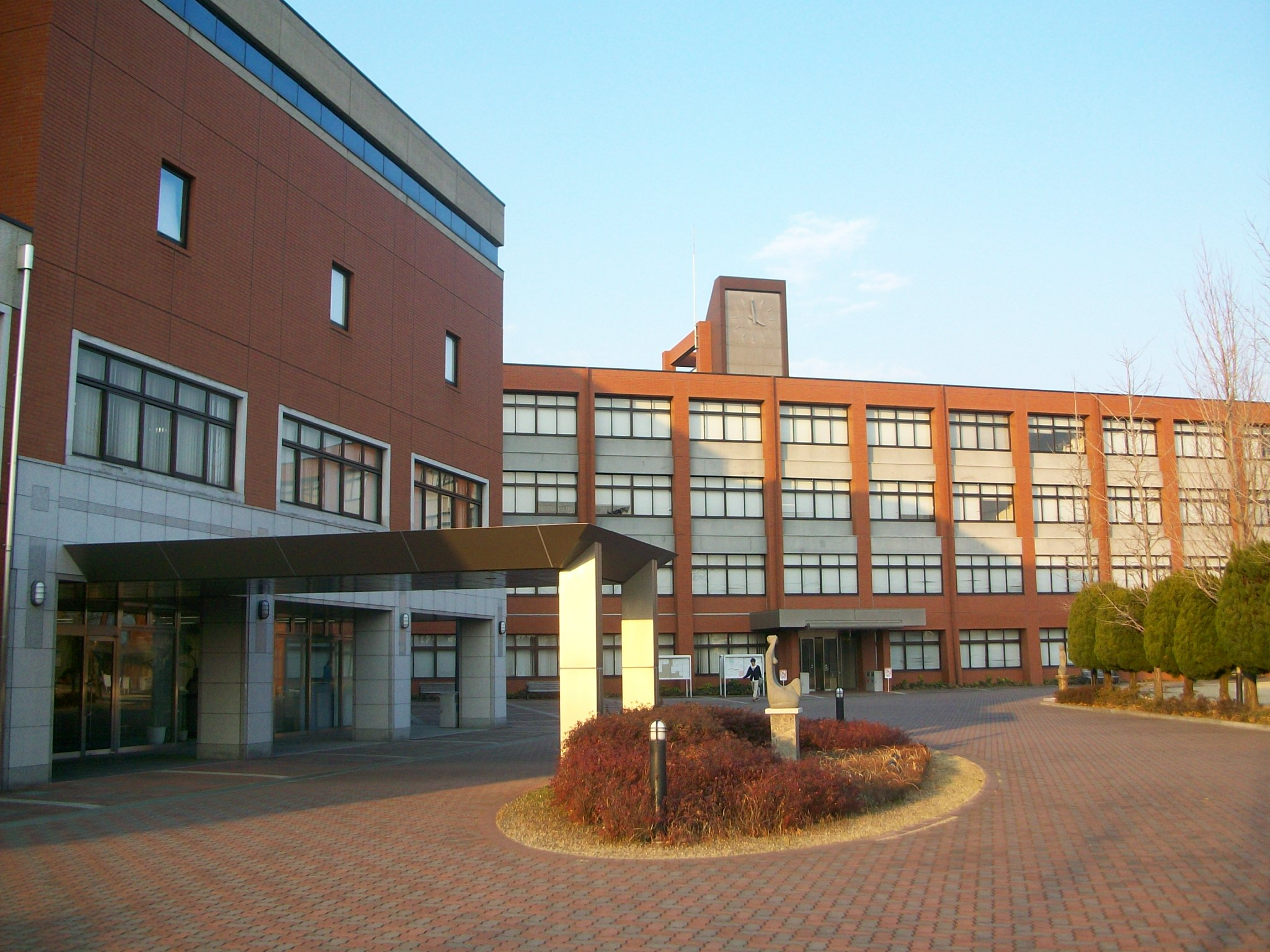
- Motto: Academic & Practical
- Type: Private
- Established: 2006
- Location: Isesaki, Gunma, Japan
- Website: tokyo-fukushi.ac.jp

Tokyo University of Social Welfare Junior College (東京福祉大学短期大学部, Tokyo Fukushi Daigaku Tanki Daigakubu) is a private junior college in Isesaki, Gunma, Japan. The College was opened in 2006, and is affiliated with the Tokyo University of Social Welfare.

== Courses available ==
The university offers courses in education, psychology, and social welfare, and the junior college offers courses in child studies.

== Academic departments ==
- Department of Child Studies

== See also ==
- Tokyo University of Social Welfare
