= Tokyo University of Social Welfare =

Private University in Tokyo, Japan

Coordinates: 35°43′39.74″N 139°43′06.66″E

- 東京福祉大学
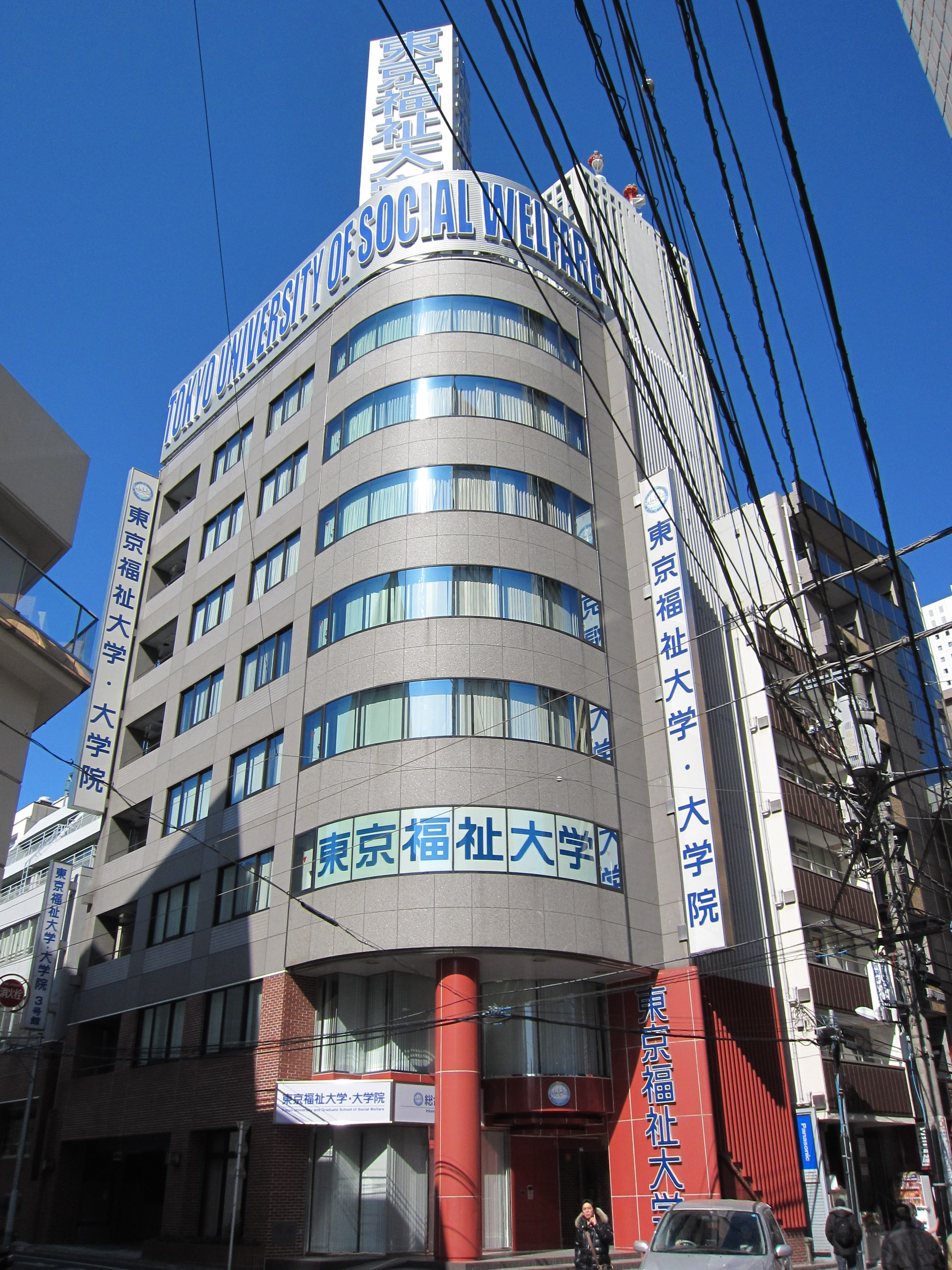
- Main Building, Ikebukuro Campus
- Motto: Academic & Practical
- Type: Private
- Established: 2000
- President: Goichi Fujita
- Location: Toshima, Tokyo, Japan
- Campus: Urban: -Ikebukuro campus -Oji campus -Nagoya campus -Isesaki campus
- Nickname: TUSW
- Website: tokyo-fukushi.ac.jp

Tokyo University of Social Welfare (TUSW) (東京福祉大学, Tōkyō fukushi daigaku) is a private university in with its main campus in Ikebukuro, Toshima, Tokyo; Kita, Tokyo; Naka-ku, Nagoya; and Isesaki, Gunma.

== Organization ==
=== Graduate schools ===
- Graduate School of Social Welfare
  - Graduate Course in Social Welfare
  - Graduate Course in Childcare
- Graduate School of Education
  - Graduate Course in Education
- Graduate School of Psychology
  - Graduate Course in Clinical Psychology

=== Undergraduate schools ===
- School of Social Welfare
  - Division of Social Work
  - Division of Child Care and Early Childhood Education
- School of Education
  - Division of Education
- School of Psychology
  - Division of Psychology

=== Special course ===
- Japanese Language Program

=== Junior college ===
- Tokyo University of Social Welfare Junior College

== Campuses ==
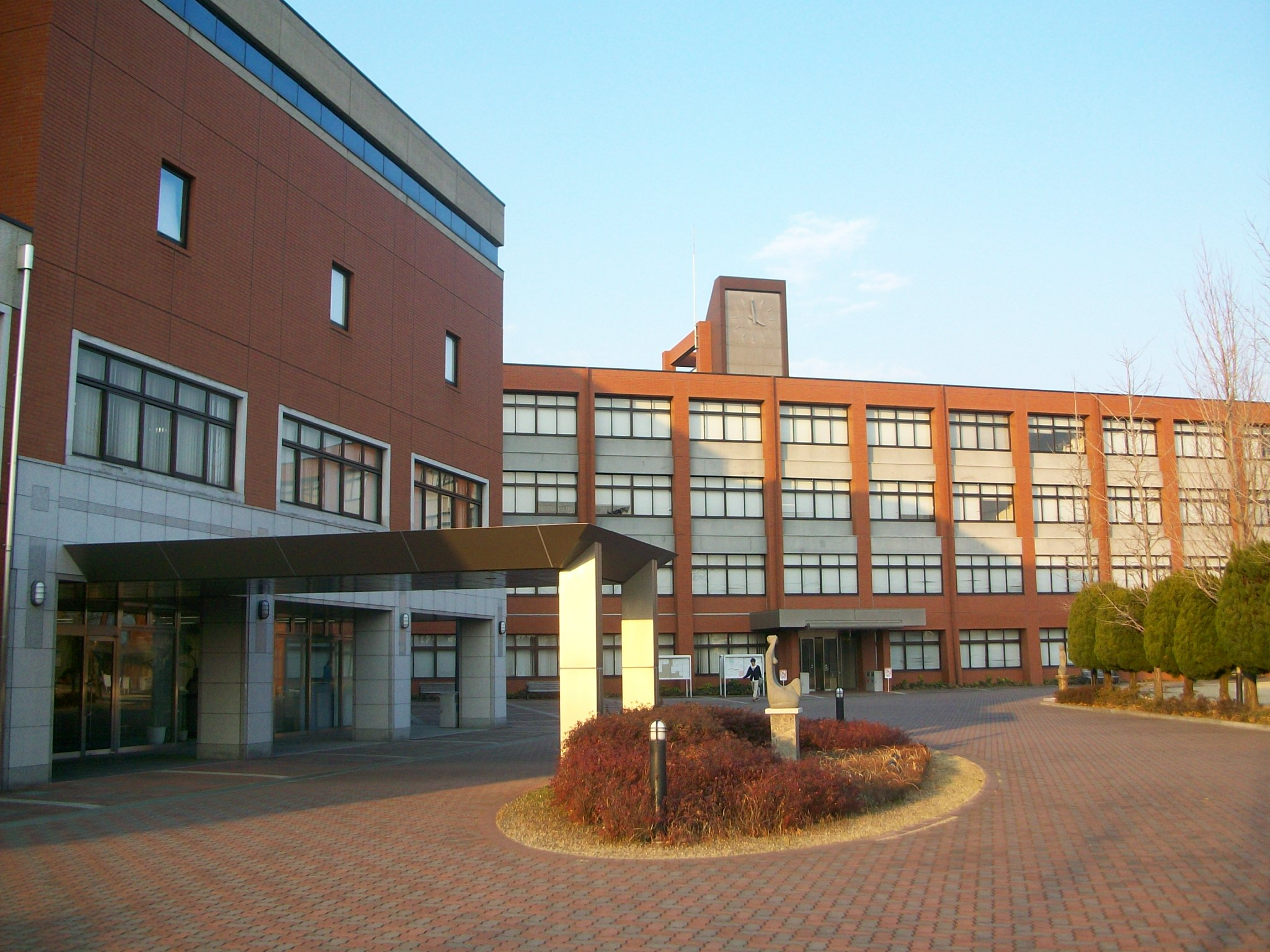
Isesaki campus

It has four campuses.

- Ikebukuro campus (Higashi-Ikebukuro, Toshima, Tokyo)
- Oji campus (Horifune, Kita, Tokyo)
- Nagoya campus (Naka-ku, Nagoya, Aichi)
- Isesaki campus (San-ou-cho, Isesaki, Gunma)
