= Gokokuji Station =

Metro station in Tokyo, Japan

Coordinates: 35°43′8.37″N 139°43′39.26″E

Gokokuji Station 護国寺駅

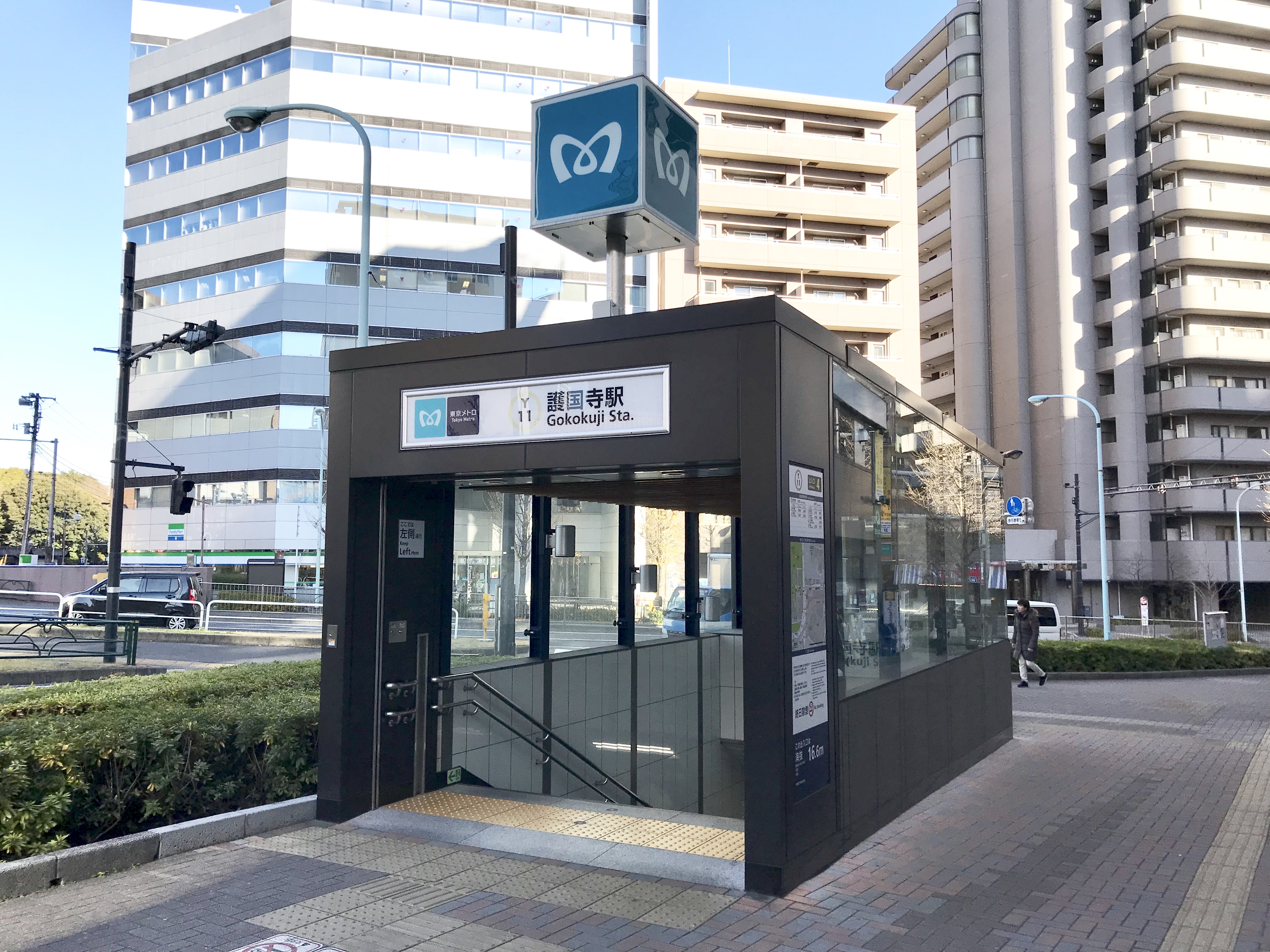
- Exit 4

Japanese name
- Shinjitai: 護国寺駅
- Kyūjitai: 護國寺驛
- Hiragana: ごこくじえき

General information
- Location: 40-8 Otsuka 5-chome, Bunkyō City, Tokyo; Japan
- Operator: Tokyo Metro
- Line: Yūrakuchō Line
- Platforms: 1 island platform
- Tracks: 2

Construction
- Structure type: Underground

Other information
- Station code: Y-11

History
- Opened: 30 October 1974; 51 years ago

Services
Preceding station	Tokyo Metro	Following station
Higashi-ikebukuro towards Wakoshi	Yūrakuchō Line	Edogawabashi towards Shin-kiba
Location
- Location within Tokyo Yamanote Loop Location within Tokyo wards area Location within Japan

Gokokuji Station (護国寺駅, Gokokuji-eki) is a subway station in Bunkyō, Tokyo, Japan, operated by Tokyo Metro. Its station number is Y-11. The station is named after a nearby Buddhist temple of the same name.

== Lines ==
Gokokuji Station is served by the Tokyo Metro Yūrakuchō Line.

== Station layout ==
The station, which is underground, consists of an island platform and two sets of tracks.

There are elevators between ground level and the ticket gate level and between the ticket gate level and platform level. There are also escalators between the ticket gate level and platform level. Along with multi-function toilets, these facilities are meant to make the station barrier free.

As part of a plan to install half-height platform screen doors on the entire Yūrakuchō Line, construction on the doors in the station was begun in mid-2010, and they have been in use since 26 March 2011.

=== Platforms ===
1	Yūrakuchō Line	for Iidabashi, Yurakucho, and Shin-Kiba
2	Yūrakuchō Line	for Ikebukuro, Kotake-mukaihara, and Wakoshi; Tobu Tojo Line for Shinrinkōen; Seibu Ikebukuro Line for Hannō

== History ==
Teito Rapid Transit Authority (TRTA) opened Gokukuji Station on 30 October 1974 with the opening of the initial section of the Yūrakuchō Line between Ikebukuro and Ginza-itchōme stations.
