= Edogawabashi Station =

Metro station in Tokyo, Japan

Coordinates: 35°42′34.13″N 139°44′0.74″E

Edogawabashi Station 江戸川橋駅

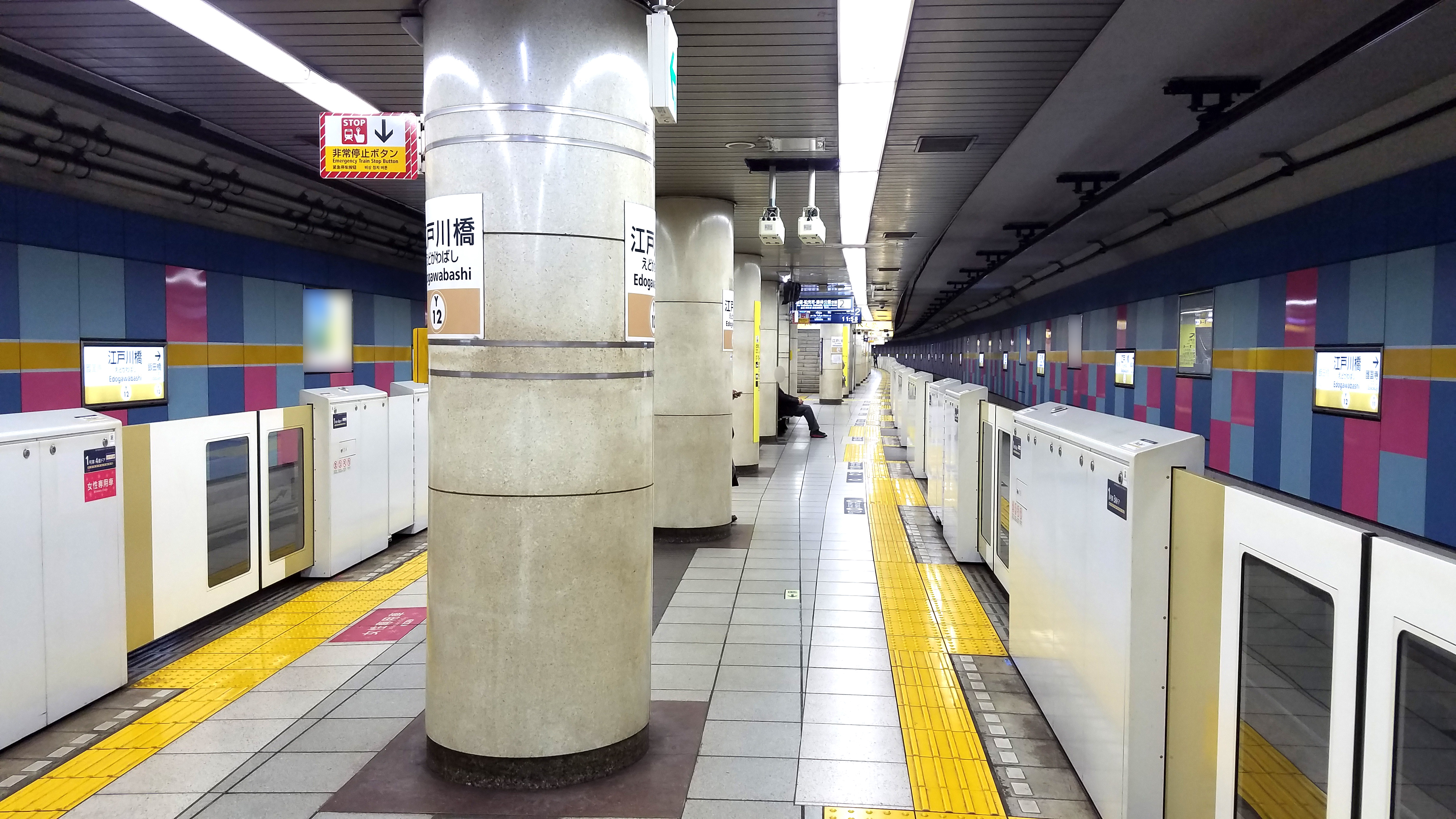
- Platforms, 2021

General information
- Location: 1-19-6 Sekiguchi, Bunkyō, Tokyo; Japan
- Operator: Tokyo Metro
- Line: Yūrakuchō Line
- Platforms: 1 island platform
- Tracks: 2

Construction
- Structure type: Underground

Other information
- Station code: Y-12

History
- Opened: 30 October 1974; 51 years ago

Services
Preceding station	Tokyo Metro	Following station
Gokokuji towards Wakoshi	Yūrakuchō Line	Iidabashi towards Shin-kiba
Location
- Location within Tokyo Yamanote Loop Location within Tokyo wards area Location within Japan

Edogawabashi Station (江戸川橋駅, Edogawabashi-eki) is a subway station in Bunkyō, Tokyo, Japan, operated by Tokyo Metro. Its station number is Y-12. The station opened on 30 October 1974.

== Lines ==
Edogawabashi Station is served by the Tokyo Metro Yūrakuchō Line.

== Station layout ==
The station, which is underground, consists of an island platform and two tracks. There is an elevator between the ticket gate level and the platform level. The toilets are on the first underground floor, outside the ticket gates. In 2005, a multi-function toilet, including facilities for infant care and the physically disabled were installed.

In 2005, the outer walls of the platform area were repaired, and the running in board was changed to a larger, rectangular shape. The outer walls were also given a unique, decorative design.

Because the station is located on an s-shaped bend in the track, two watchmen, part of the station staff, are needed.

1	Yūrakuchō Line	for Iidabashi, Yūrakuchō, and Shin-Kiba
2	Yūrakuchō Line	for Ikebukuro, Kotake-mukaihara, and Wakoshi; Tobu Tojo Line for Shinrinkōen; Seibu Ikebukuro Line for Hannō

== Surrounding area ==
Edogawabashi Station is the nearest station to the St Mary's Tokyo Cathedral.
