= Owl Tower =

Residential building in Tokyo, Japan

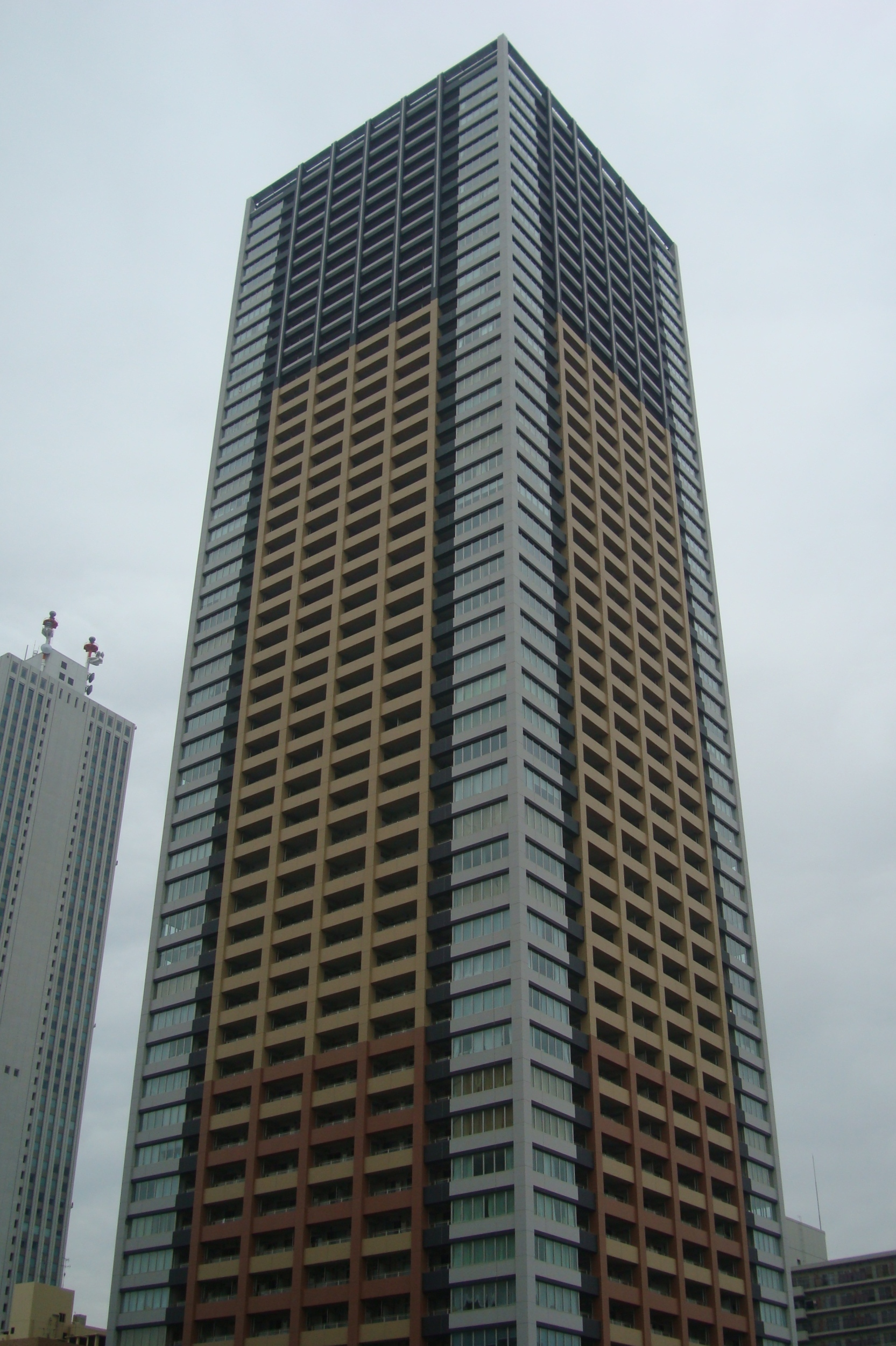
- Interactive map of the Owl Tower area

General information
- Status: Completed
- Location: 4 Higashi-Ikebukuro Toshima, Tokyo, Japan
- Coordinates: 35.727497°N 139.719772°E
- Construction started: October 2007
- Completed: January 2011
- Cost: approx. 30,000,000,000 yen

Height
- Roof: 189.2 m (621 ft)
- Top floor: 182.8 m (600 ft)

Technical details
- Floor count: 52 above ground 2 below ground
- Floor area: 79,289 m^{2} (853,460 sq ft)
- Lifts/elevators: 11

Design and construction
- Architect: Taisei Corporation
- Main contractor: Taisei Corporation

Other information
- Number of rooms: 606 – 610
- Parking: 344 spaces

The Owl Tower (アウルタワー) is a residential building in the Toshima special ward of Tokyo, Japan. Completed in January 2011, it stands at 189.2 m (621 ft) tall, with the top floor located at 182.8 m (600 ft). It is the 38th tallest building in Tokyo and the 55th tallest building in Japan.

== Overview ==
The Owl Tower was constructed as a response to the issues regarding the utilization of already existing buildings, namely to specialize skyscrapers in the area, make use of available land effectively, prevent a mixed-use of buildings, and also to encourage people to live in the Ikebukuro district. Its name references the mascot of the district. The Owl Tower is located near the Air Rise Tower, and close to the Higashi-Ikebukuro Station, to which it is directly connected by an underground promenade, and the Sunshine City complex with the Sunshine 60 skyscraper, the tallest building in Tokyo from 1978 to 1991.

The skyscraper was built on a lot with an area of 5,801.39 square metres (62,445.6 sq ft), 2,938.03 square metres (31,624.7 sq ft) of which is occupied by the building itself. Reinforced concrete, steel, and glass was used during its construction, which costed approximately 30 billion yen. The building was designed and constructed by the Taisei Corporation. The city planning decision to build the Owl Tower was made in May 2004, and the planning permission was given in January 2006. The construction began in October 2007, and was completed in January 2011. In late March of the same year, the building was ready to be moved in.

Although the Owl Tower is mainly a residential building, some storeys are meant for office or commercial use. Stores are located in the 1st basement and on the 1st floor, while offices can be found from the 2nd to the 6th floor. Apartments are situated on the remaining floors, up to the 52nd. There are 11 elevators in the skyscraper. The total floor space of the building equals roughly 79,200 square metres (853,000 sq ft). There are approximately 608 units, 473 of which are for residential purposes, and 135 of which are for non-residential purposes, with the rest of the rooms including a theater room, a fitness room, and a sky lounge, among others. 344 parking spaces are contained within the Owl Tower.

== See also ==
- List of tallest structures in Tokyo
