= Higashi-ikebukuro Station =

Metro station in Tokyo, Japan

Higashi-Ikebukuro Station 東池袋駅

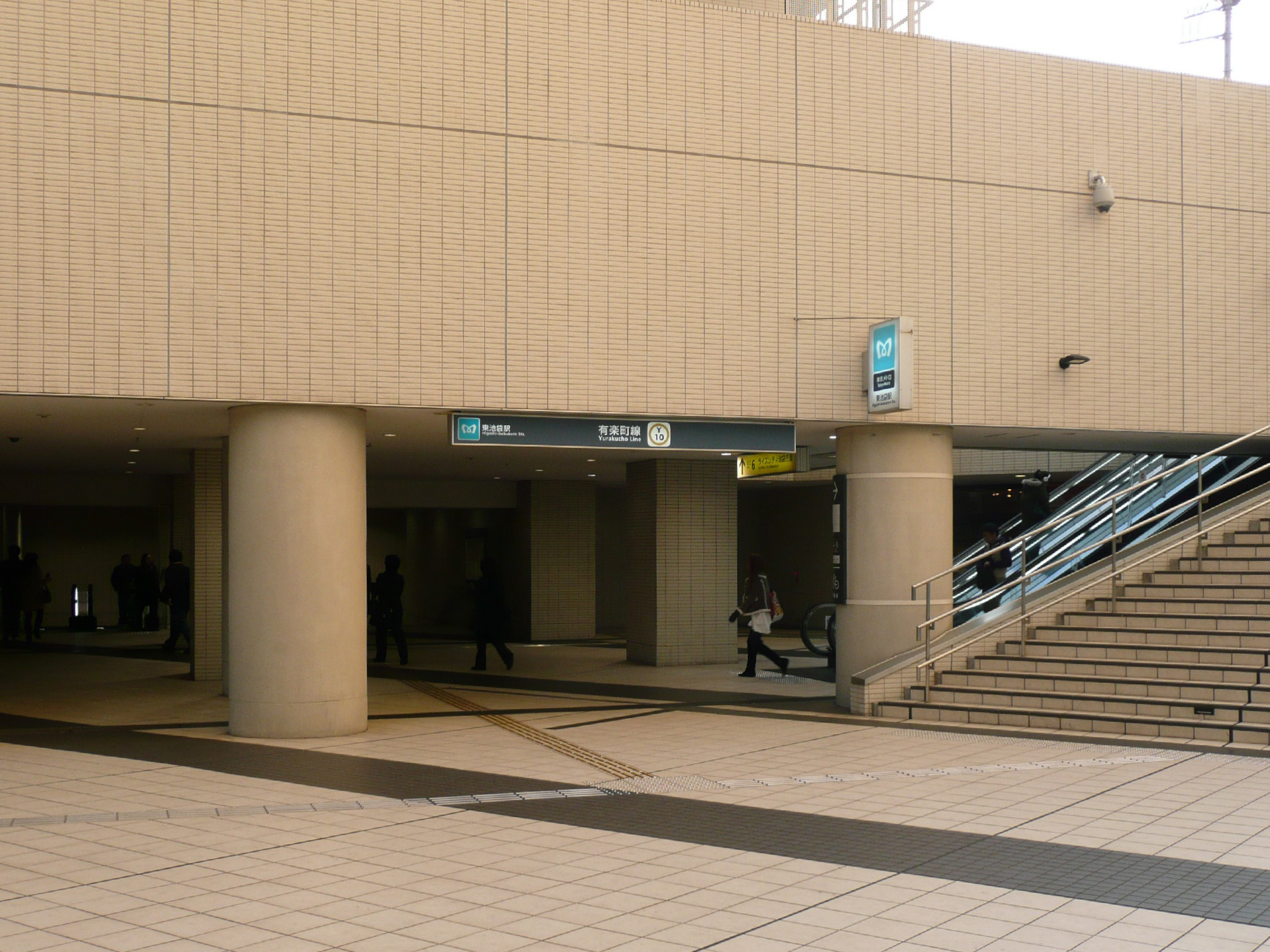
- Entrances 6 and 7 in January 2010

General information
- Location: 4-4-4 Higashi-Ikebukuro, Toshima-ku, Tokyo; Japan
- Coordinates: 35°43′30.82″N 139°43′12.7″E
- Operator: Tokyo Metro
- Line: Yūrakuchō Line
- Distance: 12.4 km (7.7 mi) from Wakoshi
- Platforms: 1 island platform
- Tracks: 2
- Connections: Higashi-Ikebukuro-yonchōme Station (Toden Arakawa Line)

Construction
- Structure type: Underground

Other information
- Station code: Y-10
- Website: Official website

History
- Opened: 30 October 1974; 51 years ago

Passengers
- FY2022: 38,132 daily

Services
| Preceding station | Tokyo Metro | Following station |
|---|---|---|
| Ikebukuro towards Wakoshi | Yūrakuchō Line | Gokokuji towards Shin-kiba |
Location
- Location within Tokyo Yamanote Loop Location within Tokyo wards area Location within Japan

Higashi-Ikebukuro Station (東池袋駅, Higashi-ikebukuro-eki) is a subway station on the Tokyo Metro Yūrakuchō Line in Toshima, Tokyo, Japan, operated by the Tokyo subway operator Tokyo Metro. The station is numbered "Y-10". It opened on October 30, 1974.

== Lines ==
Higashi-Ikebukuro Station is served by the Tokyo Metro Yūrakuchō Line and is 12.4 km from the starting point of the line at Wakoshi Station.

== Station layout ==
The station has one island platform on the second basement ("B2F") level serving two tracks.

=== Platforms ===
| 1 | Yūrakuchō Line | for Iidabashi, Yūrakuchō, and Shin-Kiba |
| 2 | Yūrakuchō Line | for Ikebukuro, Kotake-mukaihara, and Wakoshi; Tobu Tojo Line for Shinrinkōen; Seibu Ikebukuro Line for Hannō |

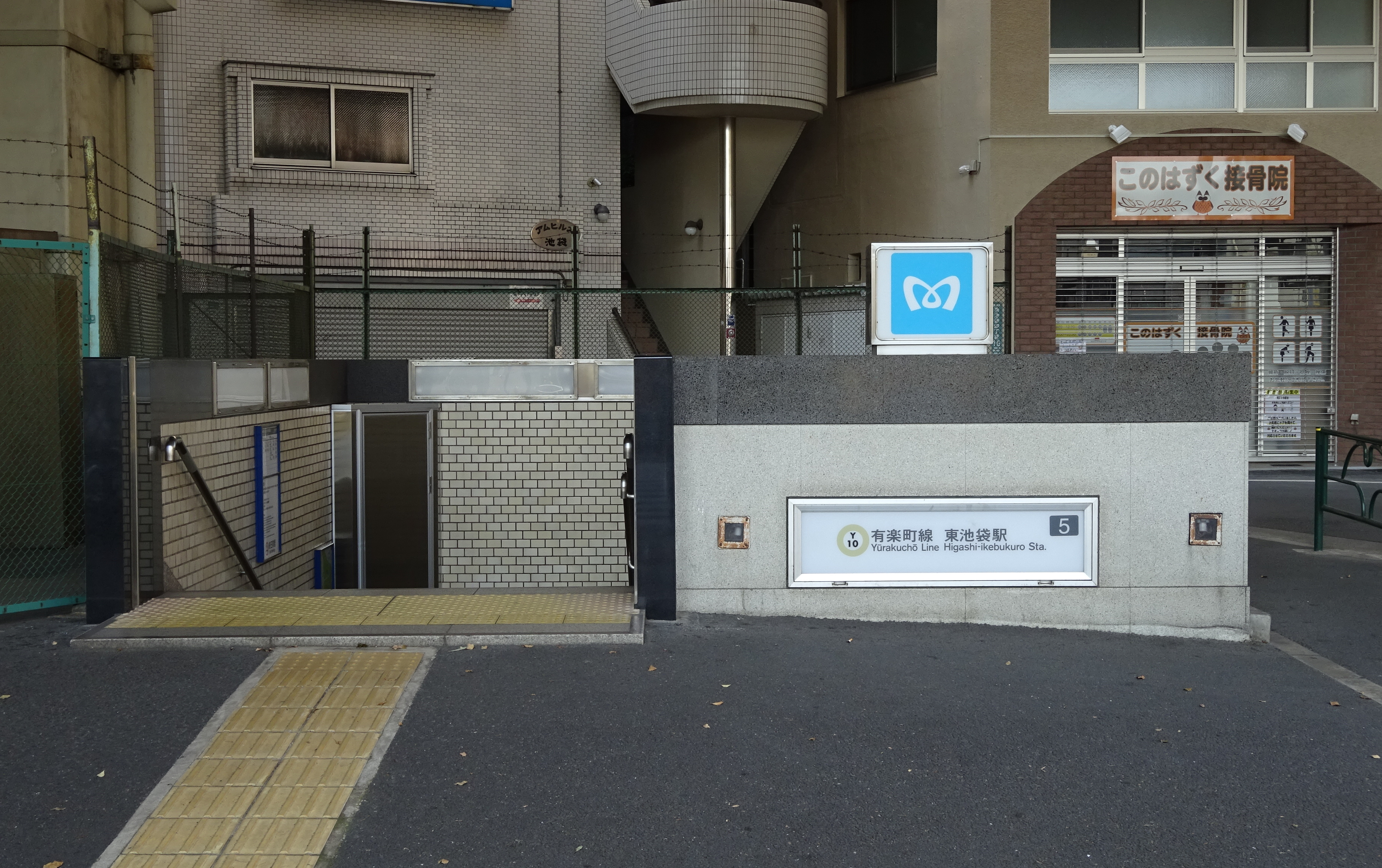
Entrance No. 5 in June 2016

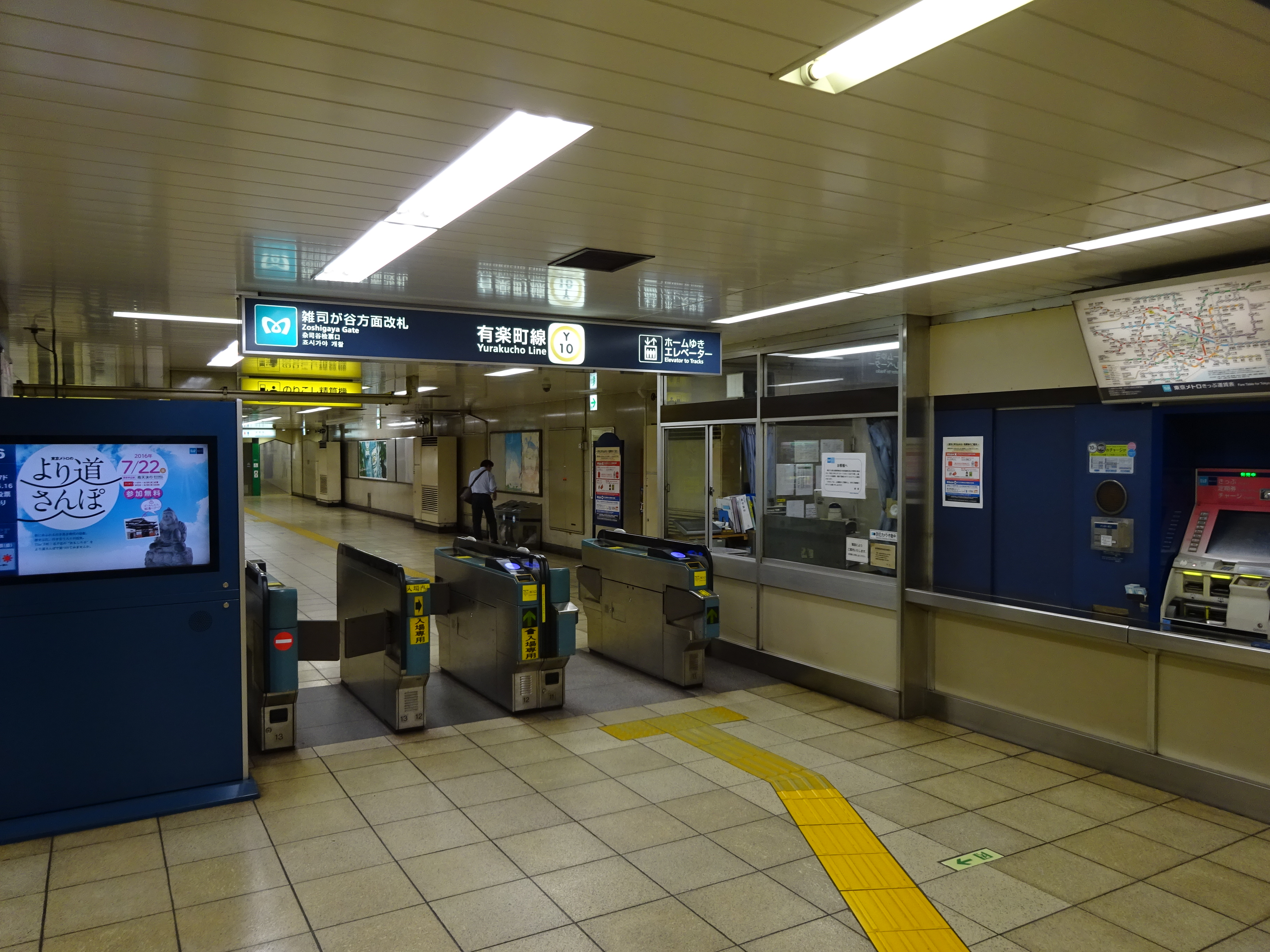
The Zoshigaya gate ticket barriers in June 2016

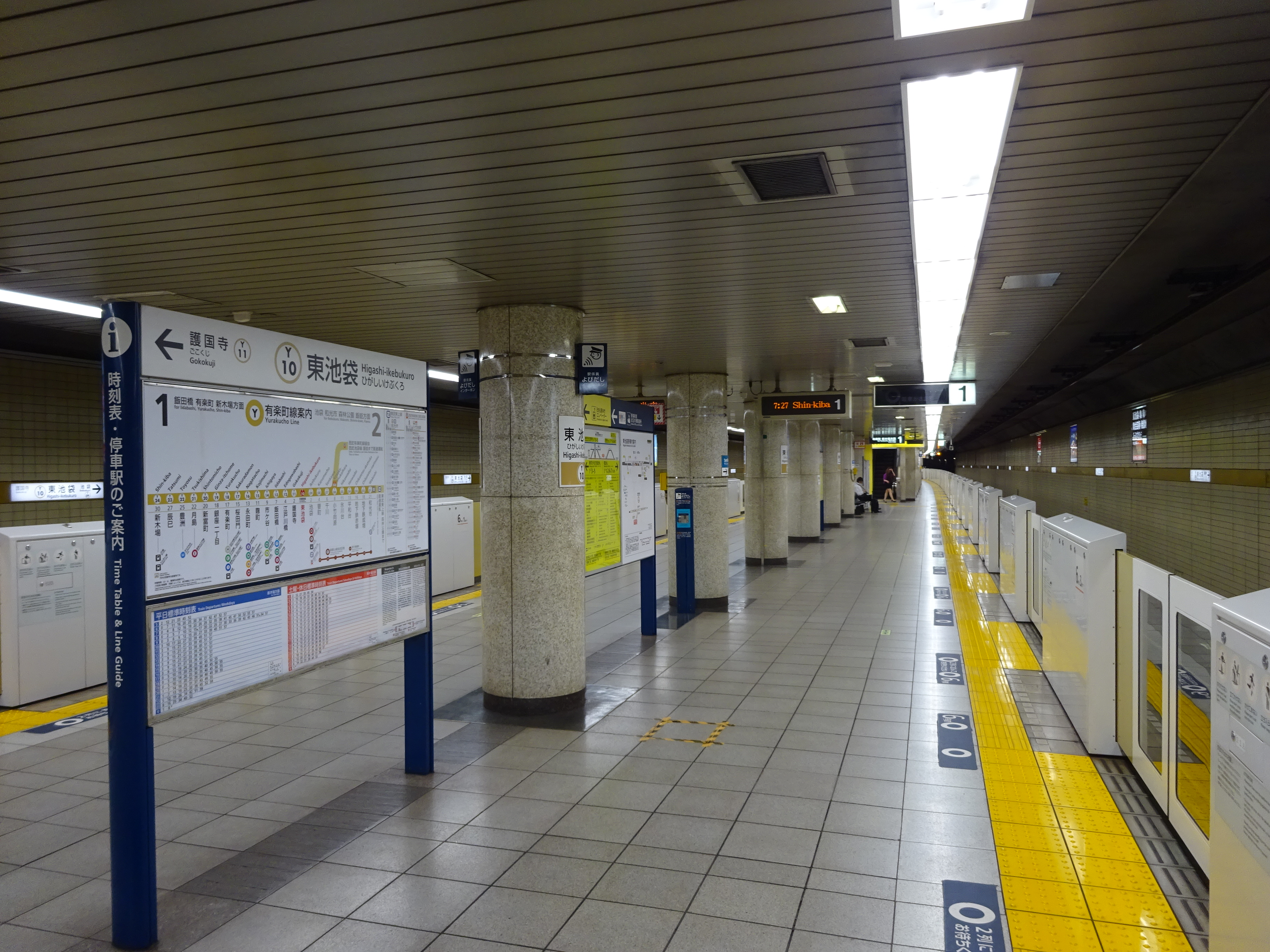
The platforms in June 2016

== History ==
Teito Rapid Transit Authority (TRTA) opened the station on 30 October 1974 with the opening of the initial section of the Yūrakuchō Line between Ikebukuro and Ginza-itchome stations.

== Passenger statistics ==
In the 2015 data available from Japan’s Ministry of Land, Infrastructure, Transport and Tourism, Higashi-Ikebukuro → Gokoku-ji was one of the train segments among Tokyo's most crowded train lines during rush hour.

In fiscal 2022, the station was used by an average of 38,132 passengers daily.

== Surrounding area ==
- Higashi-Ikebukuro-yonchōme Station on the Toden Arakawa Line
- Sunshine City
- Toshima Post Office
- Tokyo International University
- IKE・SUN PARK

== See also ==
- List of railway stations in Japan
