= Yūrakuchō Line (Tokyo Metro) =

Subway line in Tokyo, Japan

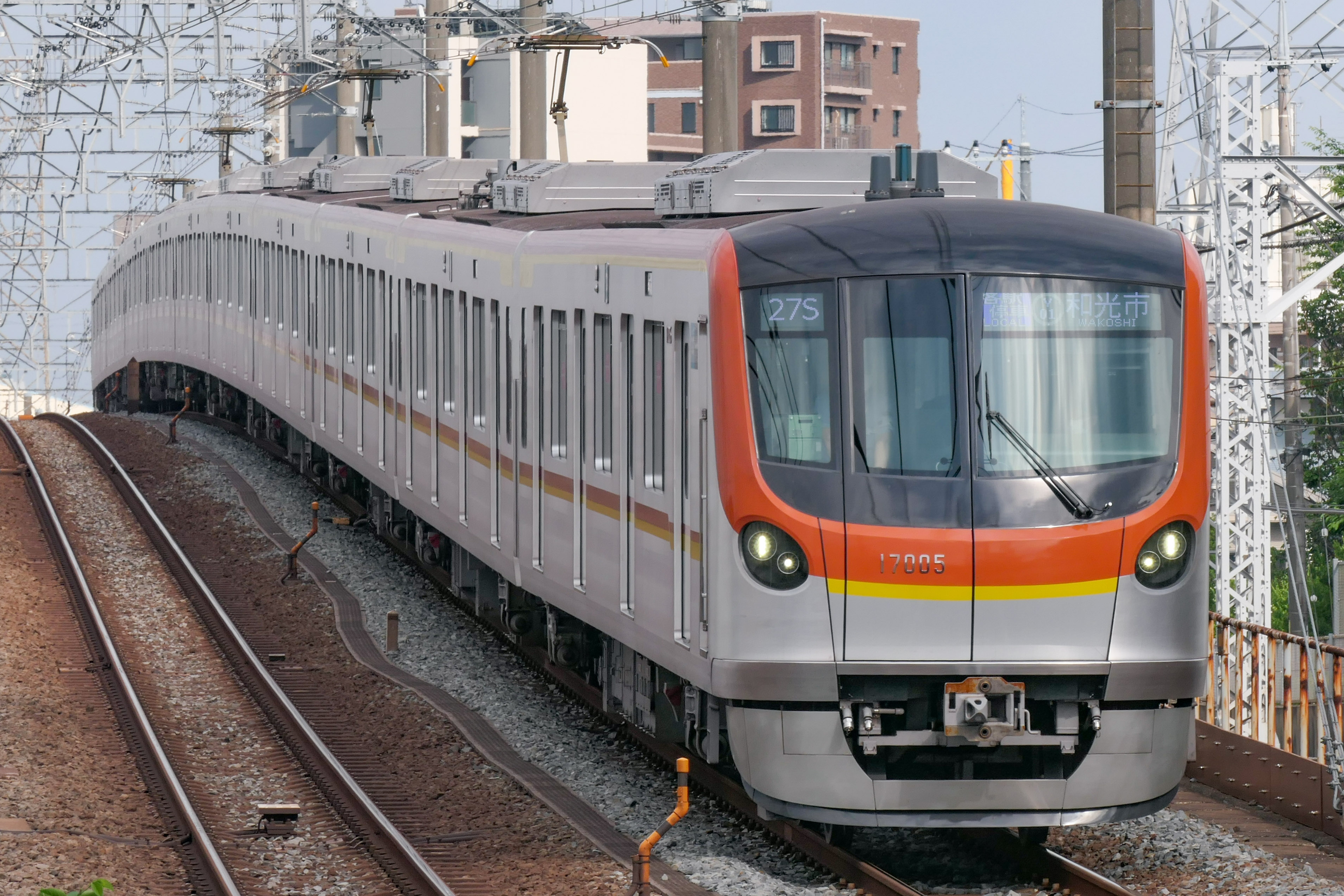
- A 17000 series train nearby Wakōshi Station

Overview
- Other name: Line 8
- Native name: 有楽町線
- Status: In service
- Owner: Tokyo Metro Co., Ltd.
- Line number: Y
- Locale: Tokyo
- Termini: Wakoshi; Shin-kiba
- Stations: 24
- Color on map: Gold

Service
- Type: Rapid transit
- System: Tokyo Subway (Tokyo Metro)
- Operator(s): Tokyo Metro Co., Ltd.
- Depot(s): Wakō, Shin-Kiba
- Rolling stock: Tokyo Metro 10000 series Tokyo Metro 17000 series Seibu 6000 and 6050 series Seibu 40000 and 40050 series Tobu 9000 and 9050 series Tobu 50070 series Tokyu 5050-4000 series (less commonly used)
- Daily ridership: 1,124,478

History
- Opened: 30 October 1974; 51 years ago
- Last extension: 1988

Technical
- Line length: 28.3 km (17.6 mi)
- Number of tracks: 2
- Track gauge: 1,067 mm (3 ft 6 in)
- Minimum radius: 150 m (490 ft)
- Electrification: Overhead line, 1,500 V DC
- Operating speed: 80 km/h (50 mph)
- Train protection system: New CS-ATC, ATO
- Maximum incline: 3.5%
Route map
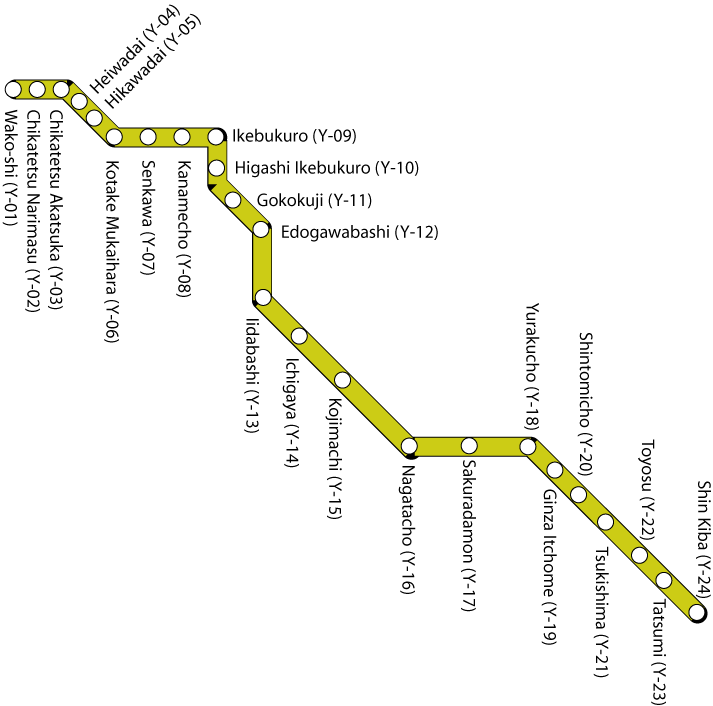

The Yūrakuchō Line (有楽町線, Yūrakuchō-sen) is a subway line in Japan owned and operated by Tokyo Metro. The line connects Wakōshi Station in Wakō, Saitama and Shin-Kiba Station in Kōtō, Tokyo. On maps, diagrams and signboards, the line is shown using the color "gold", and its stations are given numbers using the letter "Y".

The line was named after the Yūrakuchō business district in Chiyoda, Tokyo. The proper name as given in an annual report of the Ministry of Land, Infrastructure and Transport is Line No. 8 Yūrakuchō Line (8号線有楽町線, Hachi-gō-sen Yūrakuchō-sen). According to the Tokyo urban transportation plan, however, it is more complicated. The line number assigned to the section south from Kotake-Mukaihara to Shin-Kiba is Line 8, but that north of Kotake-Mukaihara to Wakōshi is Line 13, which indicates the section is a portion of Fukutoshin Line which shares the same number.

The line was named after the Yūrakuchō business district in Chiyoda, Tokyo and was selected through a public competition that received 30,591 entries.

The most popular proposal was "Kojimachi Line." However, the name was not adopted because the kanji used for "Koji" (麹) was not general-use at the time, making it difficult to read and unfamiliar to the general public. Many submissions incorporated references to Yurakucho. As a result, the name "Yurakucho Line" was officially adopted in 1974.

Other proposed names included "Sakurada Line" and "Sotobori (Outer moat) Line."

== Services ==
The Yūrakuchō Line runs generally northwest to southeast between Wakōshi Station in Saitama Prefecture and Shin-Kiba Station in Kōtō Ward. Although it was originally planned as a bypass for the established Marunouchi Line through central Tokyo, it was also built to serve the developing wards of Itabashi, Nerima, Toshima, and Koto. The section between Wakōshi and Kotake-mukaihara shares tracks with its sister line, the Tokyo Metro Fukutoshin Line.

The Yūrakuchō Line has inter-running counterparts on its northern side, both of which are "major" Japanese private railway companies in Greater Tokyo. One is the Tobu Railway at Wakōshi, north to Shinrin-kōen. The other is the Seibu Railway at Kotake-Mukaihara with its bypass line Seibu Yūrakuchō Line connecting to its main Ikebukuro Line, through trains north to Kotesashi or Hannō.

According to the Tokyo Metropolitan Bureau of Transportation, as of June 2009 the Yūrakuchō Line is the fifth most crowded subway line in Tokyo, at its peak running at 173% capacity between Higashi-Ikebukuro and Gokokuji stations.

Semi-express (準急) services ran on the Yūrakuchō Line between 14 June 2008 and 6 March 2010, operating twice hourly between Wakōshi and Shin-Kiba. Between Wakōshi and Ikebukuro, semi-express trains stopped only at Kotake-Mukaihara; between Ikebukuro and Shin-Kiba, trains stopped at all stations. The semi-express trains ran between rush hours during weekdays and more frequently on weekends and holidays. These services were abolished and replaced with local services on 6 March 2010.

== History ==
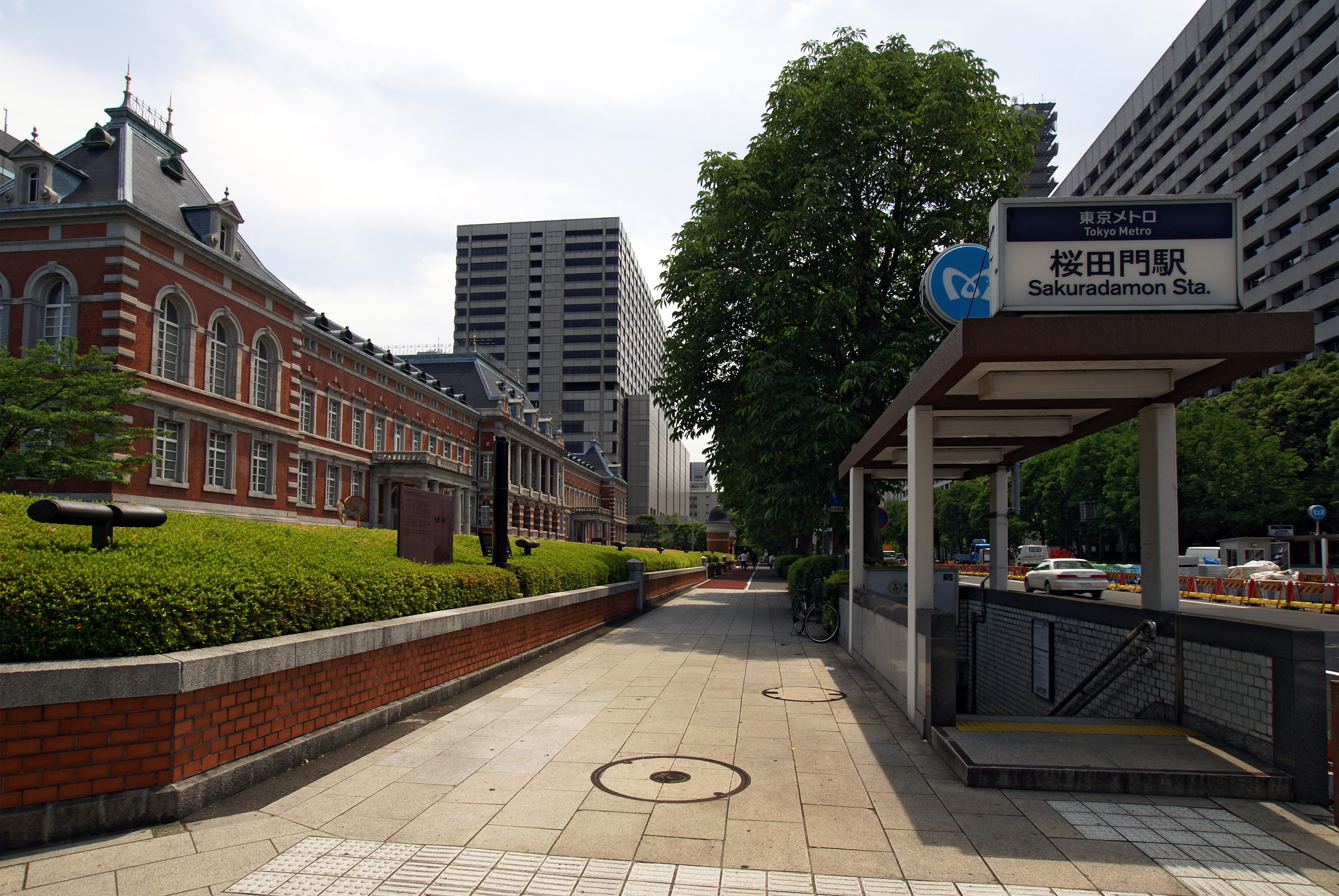
Sakuradamon Station exit

The Yūrakuchō Line was first proposed in 1962 alongside the Chiyoda Line. Urban Transportation Council Report No. 6 (都市交通審議会答申第6号) outlined it as a Line 10 (17.5 km) connecting "Nakamurabashi - Mejiro - Iidabashi - Asakusabashi - Kinshicho". On August 29 of the same year, the Ministry of Construction officially designated Line 10 as Line 8, approving a route connecting "Nakamurabashi – Ekoda – Nishi-Ochiai – Shiinamachi – Mejiro – Edogawabashi – Iidabashi – Jimbocho – Sudacho – Higashi-Ryogoku Midoricho – Kinshicho".

In 1968, it was later revised to run between Chikatetsu-narimasu Station in the northwest and Shintomichō Station in the southeast; the extensions to Wakoshi and Shin-kiba were not confirmed at the time.

Line 8 was planned to serve areas that were not served by the Tokyo subway network such as Nerima and Koto Wards, while providing an adequate bypass for the overcrowding Marunouchi Line from Ikebukuro to Ginza-itchōme. This initial section began construction in 1970 and opened for revenue service on 30 October 1974 as the Yūrakuchō Line. In the late 1970s, the extensions towards Wakoshi and Shin-kiba were authorized. On 27 March 1980, the second section between Ginza-itchōme and Shintomichō section opened, while the third section between Eidan-narimasu (now Chikatetsu-narimasu) and Ikebukuro opened on 24 June 1983.

Through services with the Seibu Yūrakuchō Line began on 1 October 1983 with the opening of the Kotake-Mukaihara – Shin-Sakuradai section. The northwestern extension to Wakōshi opened on 25 August 1987, allowing through service with the Tōbu Tōjō Line. The final section from Shintomichō to Shin-kiba opened on 8 June 1988, completing the current line.

On 18 March 1993, 07 series EMUs introduced. On 7 December 1994, the "Yūrakuchō New Line" (now the Fukutoshin Line) opened from Kotake-mukaihara to Ikebukuro. All trains on it made Ikebukuro their terminus and did not stop at Senkawa or Kanamechō. Through service from Shin-kiba or Ikebukuro (on the New Line) to Nerima on the Seibu Yūrakuchō Line began on that same day, with through operation to the Seibu Ikebukuro Line beyond Nerima beginning on 26 March 1998.

On 1 April 2004, the owner of the line changed from Teito Rapid Transit Authority (TRTA, Eidan) to Tokyo Metro due to the former's privatization. Women-only cars were introduced on 31 October 2005. 10000 series were introduced to the line on 1 September 2006.

On 3 May 2008, Limited Express "Bay Resort" (operated first from/to Odakyu Line) services began operating. On 14 June 2008, the Tokyo Metro Fukutoshin Line began service, and the Yūrakuchō New Line was absorbed into it. The Yūrakuchō Line shares tracks with the Fukutoshin Line between Wakōshi and Kotake-Mukaihara. Semi-Express services began running until they were abolished on 6 March 2010.

In October 2008, automatic train control was enabled on the Yūrakuchō Line. On 10 September 2012, 10-car 5050-4000 series sets entered revenue service on the Yūrakuchō Line, with inter-running through to the Tobu Tojo Line. Since 26 March 2017, Seibu operates the S-Train limited-stop express service between Toyosu and Tokorozawa on the Seibu Ikebukuro Line on weekday mornings and evenings.

On 6 August 2022, "Wanman" one-person operation began on the section between Kotake-Mukaihara and Shin-Kiba.

== Stations ==
List of Yūrakuchō Line stations

- All stations are located in Tokyo.
- Local trains stop at every station.
  - S-Train services stop at the stations indicated by "●" and "↑" (alighting only during the morning, boarding only during the evening) and pass all stations indicated by "|".

=== Main Line ===
No.	Station	Japanese	Distance (km)		S-Train	Transfers	Location	
No.	Station	Japanese	Between stations	From Y-01	S-Train	Transfers	Location	
↑ Through services to/from Shiki, Kawagoeshi, Shinrin-kōen via the Tojo Line ↑
Y-01	Wakoshi	和光市 (Note: Wakoshi is shared by both Tobu and Tokyo Metro; Tobu manages the station.)	-	0.0	(Note: The S-Train service runs between Toyosu and Tokorozawa on the Ikebukuro Line on weekday mornings and evenings.)	Fukutoshin Line (F-01; same tracks); Tojo Line (TJ11; some through services)	Wakō, Saitama	
Y-02	Chikatetsu-narimasu	地下鉄成増	2.2	2.2	(Note: The S-Train service runs between Toyosu and Tokorozawa on the Ikebukuro Line on weekday mornings and evenings.)	Fukutoshin Line (F-02; same tracks); Tojo Line (Narimasu: TJ10)	Itabashi	Tokyo
Y-03	Chikatetsu-akatsuka	地下鉄赤塚	1.4	3.6	(Note: The S-Train service runs between Toyosu and Tokorozawa on the Ikebukuro Line on weekday mornings and evenings.)	Fukutoshin Line (F-03; same tracks); Tojo Line (Shimo-Akatsuka: TJ09)	Nerima	Tokyo
Y-04	Heiwadai	平和台	1.8	5.4	(Note: The S-Train service runs between Toyosu and Tokorozawa on the Ikebukuro Line on weekday mornings and evenings.)	Fukutoshin Line (F-04; same tracks)	Nerima	Tokyo
Y-05	Hikawadai	氷川台	1.4	6.8	(Note: The S-Train service runs between Toyosu and Tokorozawa on the Ikebukuro Line on weekday mornings and evenings.)	Fukutoshin Line (F-05; same tracks)	Nerima	Tokyo
↑ Through services to/from Shakujii-kōen, Hōya, Kiyose, Tokorozawa, Kotesashi, Hannō via Seibu Yūrakuchō Line and Ikebukuro Line ↑
Y-06	Kotake-mukaihara	小竹向原 (Note: Kotake-mukaihara is shared by both Seibu Railway and Tokyo Metro; Tokyo Metro manages the station.)	1.5	8.3	|	Fukutoshin Line (F-06; same tracks); Seibu Yūrakuchō Line (SI37; some through services)	Nerima	Tokyo
Y-07	Senkawa	千川	1.0	9.3	|	Fukutoshin Line (F-07)	Toshima	Tokyo
Y-08	Kanamecho	要町	1.0	10.3	|	Fukutoshin Line (F-08)	Toshima	Tokyo
Y-09	Ikebukuro	池袋	1.2	11.5	(Note: The S-Train service stops at Ikebukuro on weekends and national holidays, when it runs between Seibu-Chichibu on the Seibu Chichibu Line and Motomachi-Chukagai on the Minatomirai Line via the Fukutoshin Line. Passengers cannot board the S-Train service at Ikebukuro.)	Marunouchi Line (M-25); Fukutoshin Line (F-09); Yamanote Line (JY13); Saikyō Line (JA12); Shōnan–Shinjuku Line (JS21); Tojo Line (TJ01); Ikebukuro Line (SI01)	Toshima	Tokyo
Y-10	Higashi-ikebukuro	東池袋	0.9	12.4	|	Toden Arakawa Line (Higashi-ikebukuro-yonchome: SA25)	Toshima	Tokyo
Y-11	Gokokuji	護国寺	1.1	13.5	|		Bunkyō	Tokyo
Y-12	Edogawabashi	江戸川橋	1.3	14.8	|		Bunkyō	Tokyo
Y-13	Iidabashi	飯田橋	1.6	16.4	↑	Tōzai Line (T-06); Namboku Line (N-10); Ōedo Line (E-06); Chūō–Sōbu Line (JB16)	Shinjuku	Tokyo
Y-14	Ichigaya	市ケ谷	1.1	17.5	|	Namboku Line (N-09); Shinjuku Line (S-04); Chūō–Sōbu Line (JB15)	Chiyoda	Tokyo
Y-15	Kojimachi	麹町	0.9	18.4	|		Chiyoda	Tokyo
Y-16	Nagatacho	永田町	0.9	19.3	|	Hanzōmon Line (Z-04); Namboku Line (N-07); Ginza Line (Akasaka-mitsuke: G-05); Marunouchi Line (Akasaka-mitsuke: M-13)	Chiyoda	Tokyo
Y-17	Sakuradamon	桜田門	0.9	20.2	|		Chiyoda	Tokyo
Y-18	Yūrakuchō	有楽町	1.0	21.2	↑	Yamanote Line (JY30); Keihin–Tōhoku Line (JK25); Hibiya Line (Hibiya: H-08); Chiyoda Line (Hibiya: C-09); Mita Line (Hibiya: I-08)	Chiyoda	Tokyo
Y-19	Ginza-itchome	銀座一丁目	0.5	21.7	|	Ginza Line (Ginza: G-09); Marunouchi Line (Ginza: M-16); Hibiya Line (Ginza: H-09)	Chūō	Tokyo
Y-20	Shintomicho	新富町	0.7	22.4	|	Hibiya Line (Tsukiji: H-11)	Chūō	Tokyo
Y-21	Tsukishima	月島	1.3	23.7	|	Ōedo Line (E-16)	Chūō	Tokyo
Y-22	Toyosu	豊洲	1.4	25.1	●	Yurikamome (U-16)	Kōtō	Tokyo
Y-23	Tatsumi	辰巳	1.7	26.8			Kōtō	Tokyo
Y-24	Shin-kiba	新木場	1.5	28.3		Keiyō Line (JE05); Rinkai Line (R-01)	Kōtō	Tokyo

== Rolling stock ==
All types are operated as 10-car sets.

=== Tokyo Metro ===
- Tokyo Metro 10000 series (from September 2006)
- Tokyo Metro 17000 series (from 21 February 2021)
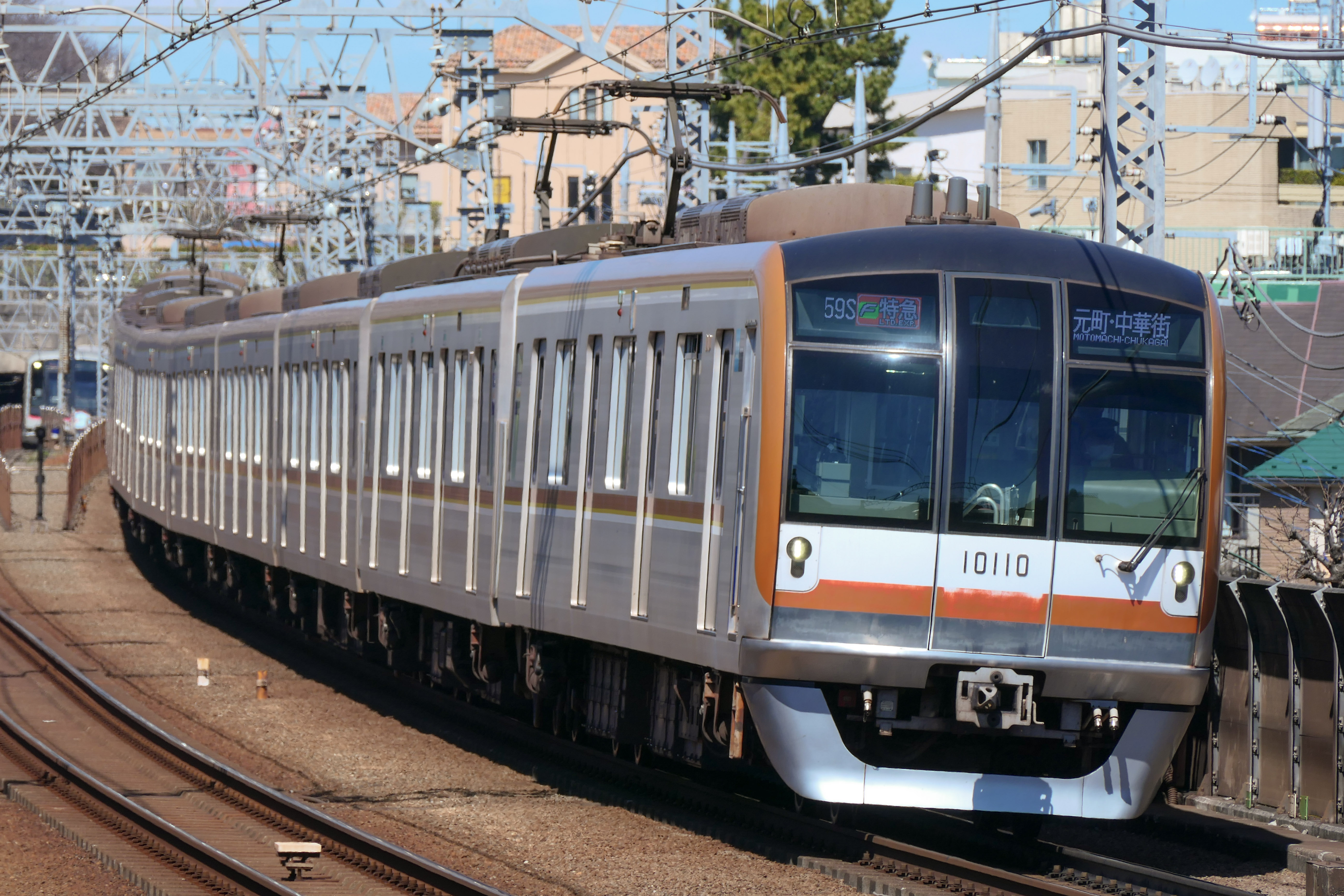
A Tokyo Metro 10000 series EMU

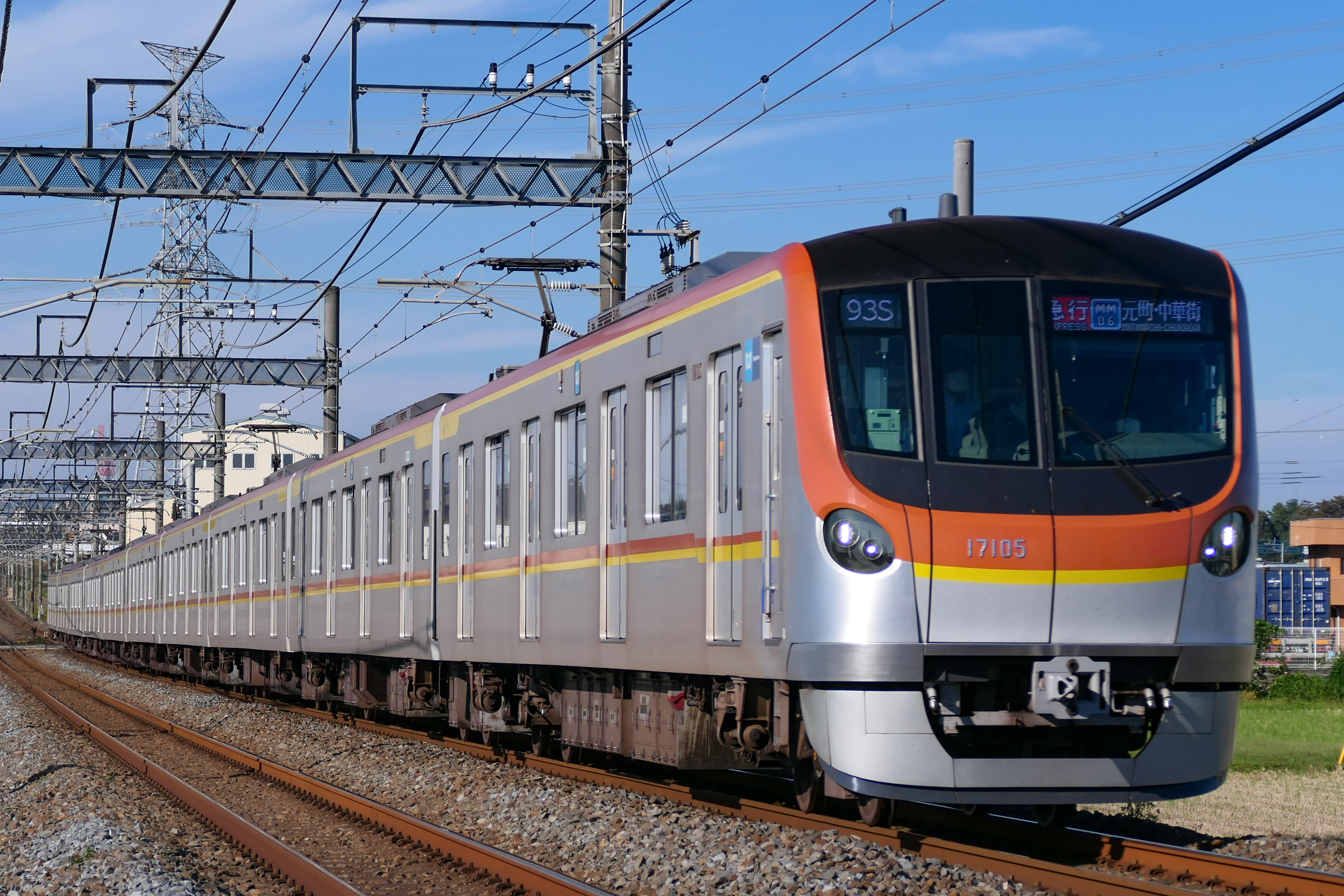
A Tokyo Metro 17000 series EMU

=== Other operators ===
- Seibu 6000 series
- Seibu 40000 series (S-Train services)
- Seibu 40050 series
- Tobu 9000 series
- Tobu 9050 series
- Tobu 50070 series
- Tokyu 5050-4000 series could run on the line, but only in the special case of emergency schedule adjustments.
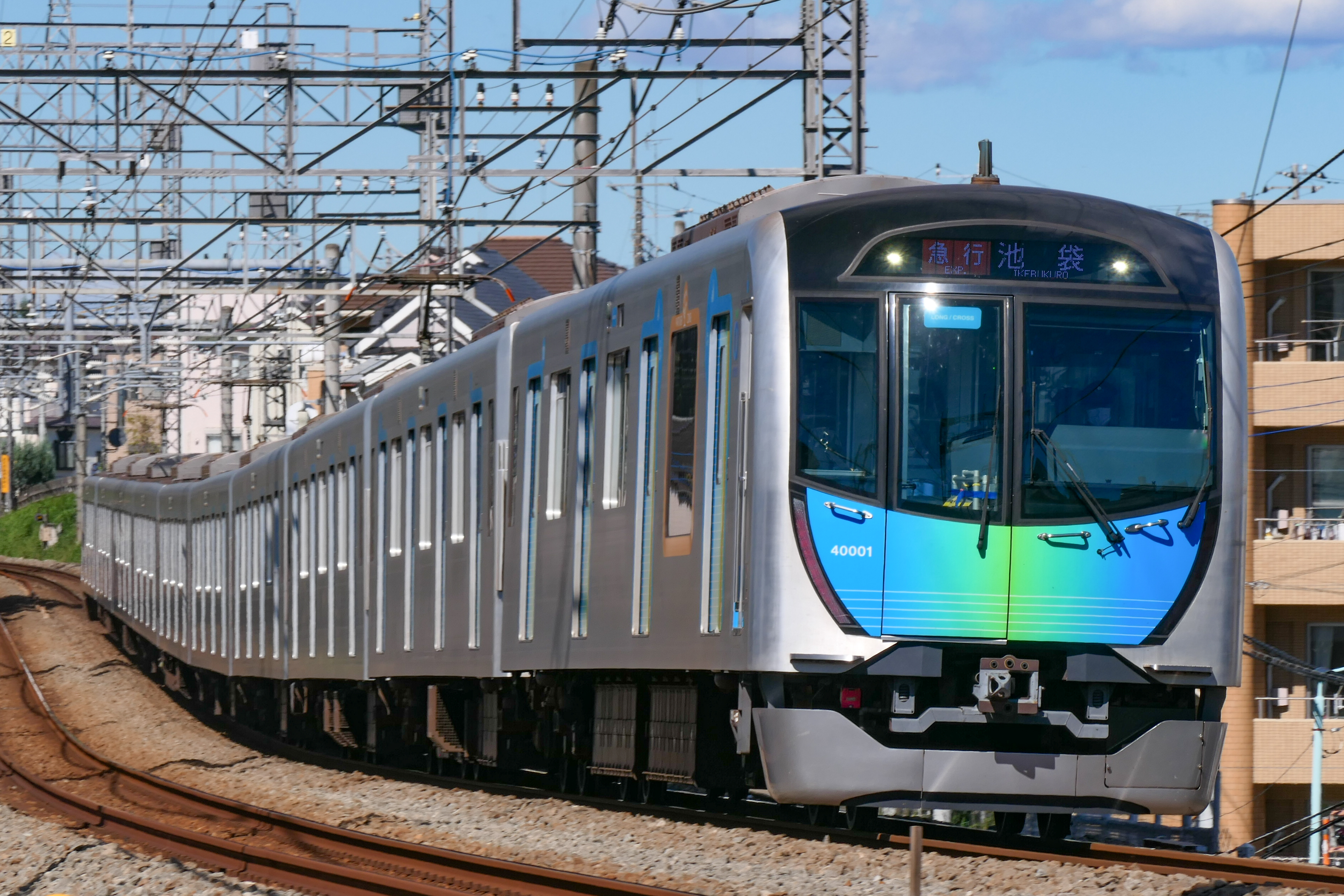
Seibu 40000 series EMU

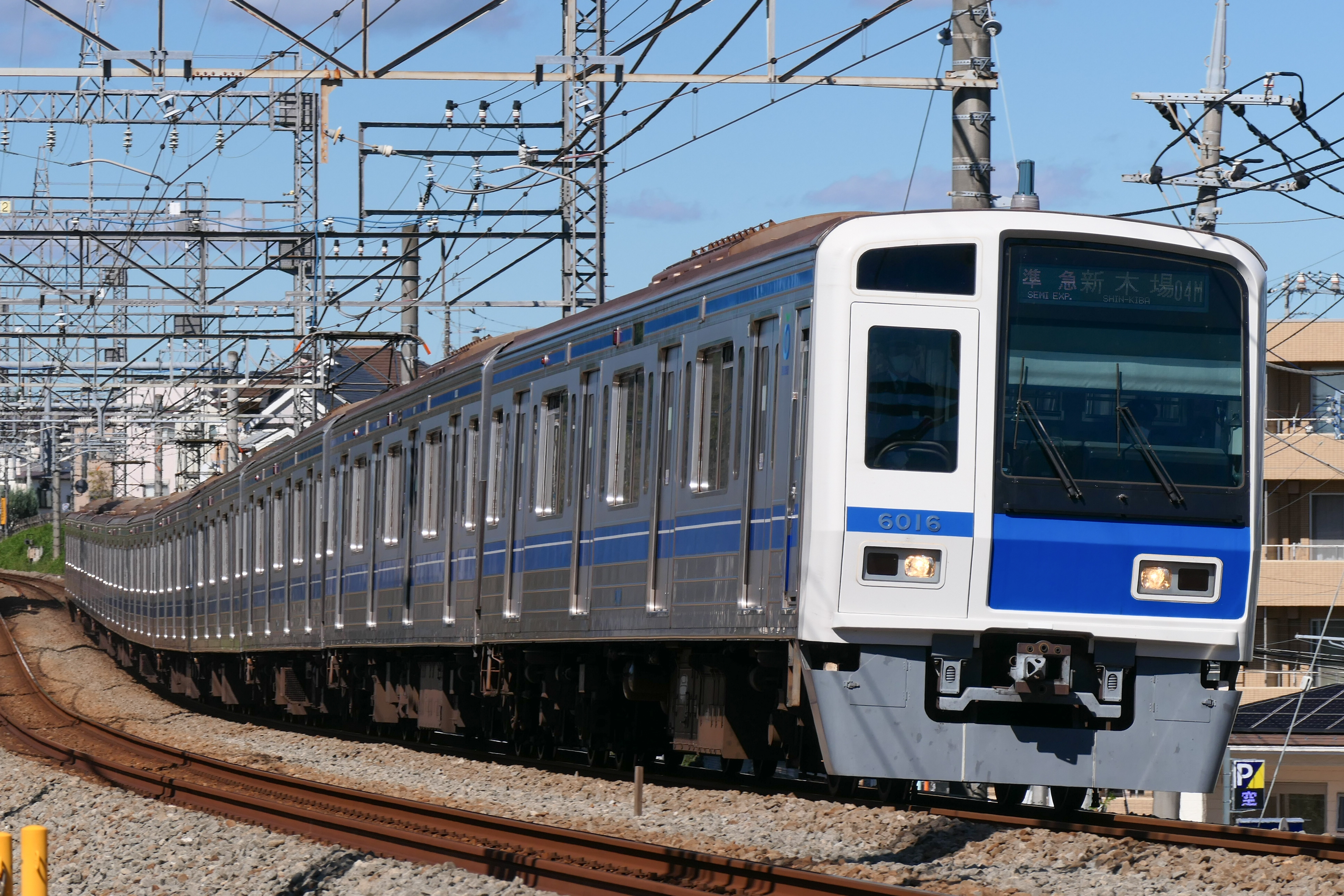
Seibu 6000 series EMU

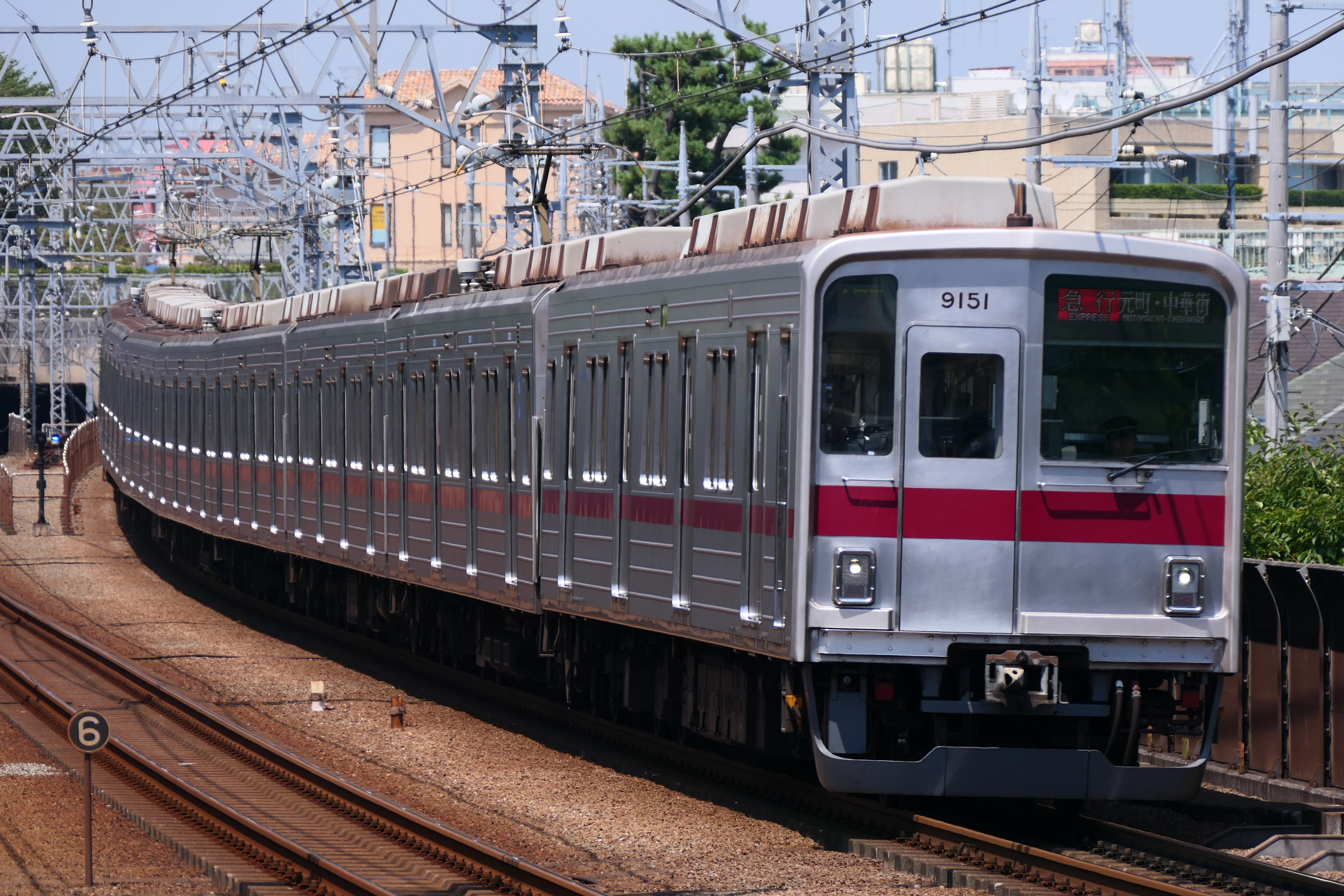
Tobu 9000 series EMU

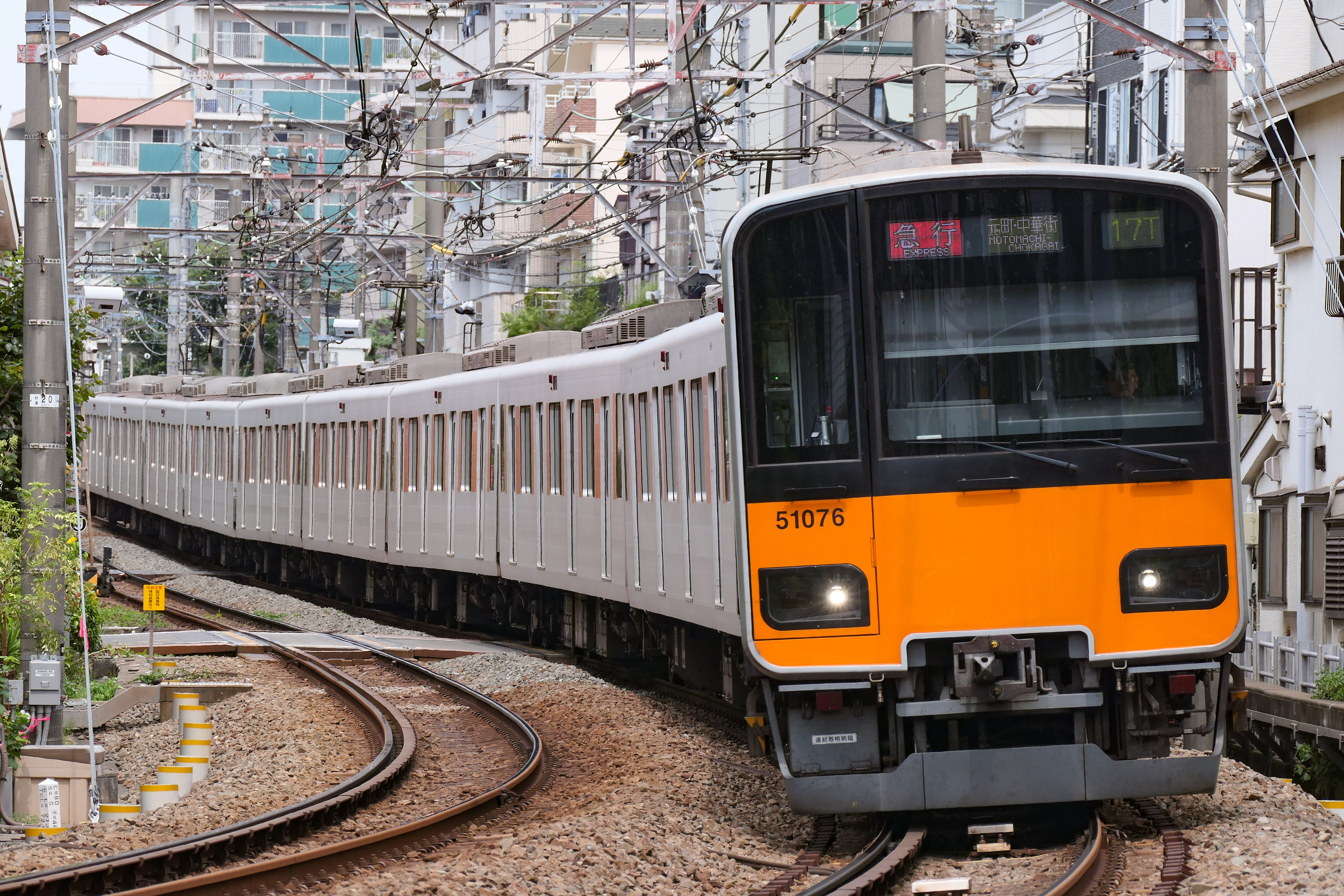
Tobu 50070 series EMU

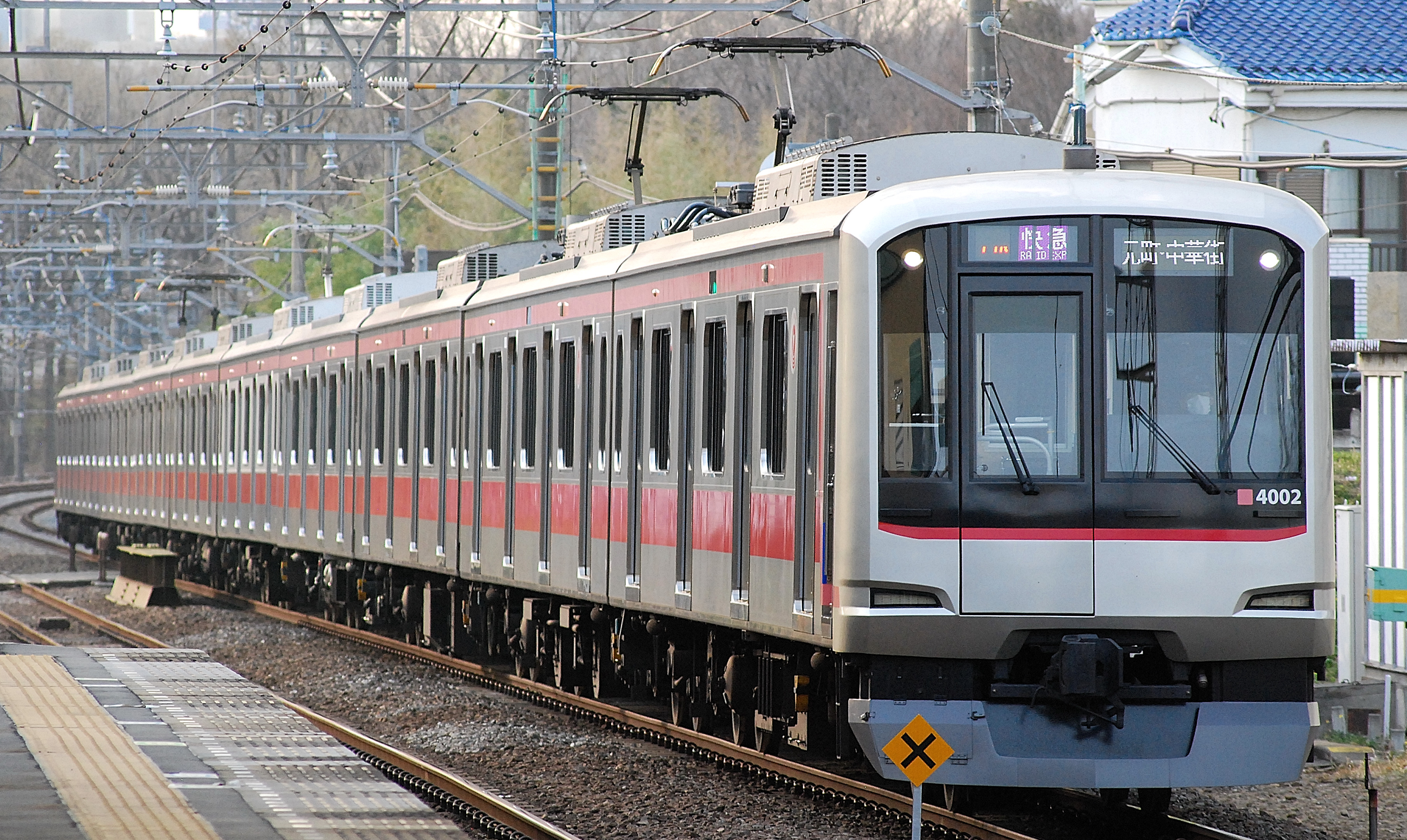
Tokyu 5050-4000 series EMU (used only in emergency schedule adjustments)

=== Former rolling stock ===
- Tokyo Metro 7000 series (from 1974 until 29 October 2021)
- Tokyo Metro 07 series (from 1992 until 2007)
- Odakyu 60000 series MSE (Romancecar, as Limited Express Bay Resort, occasionally)
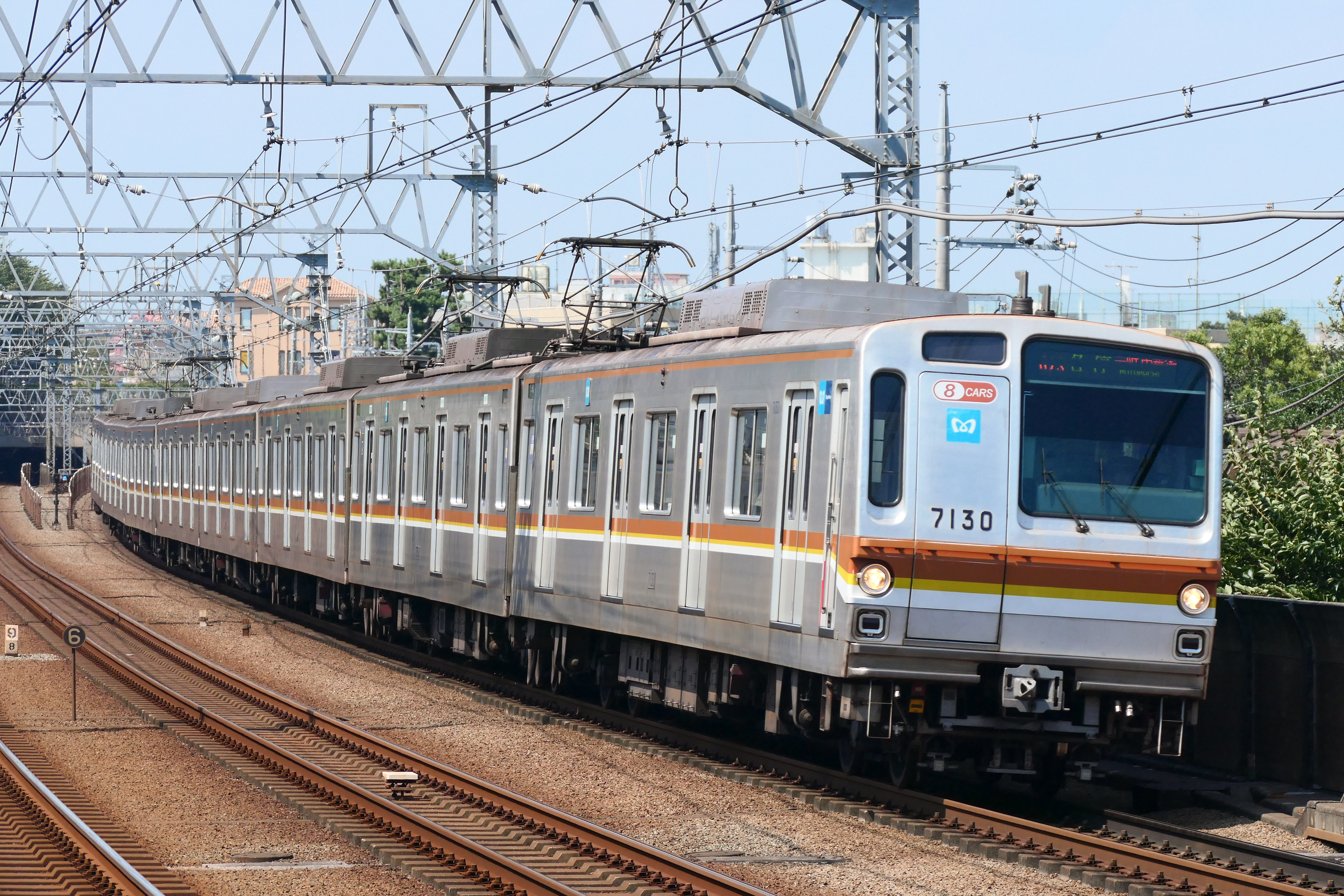
A Tokyo Metro 7000 series EMU

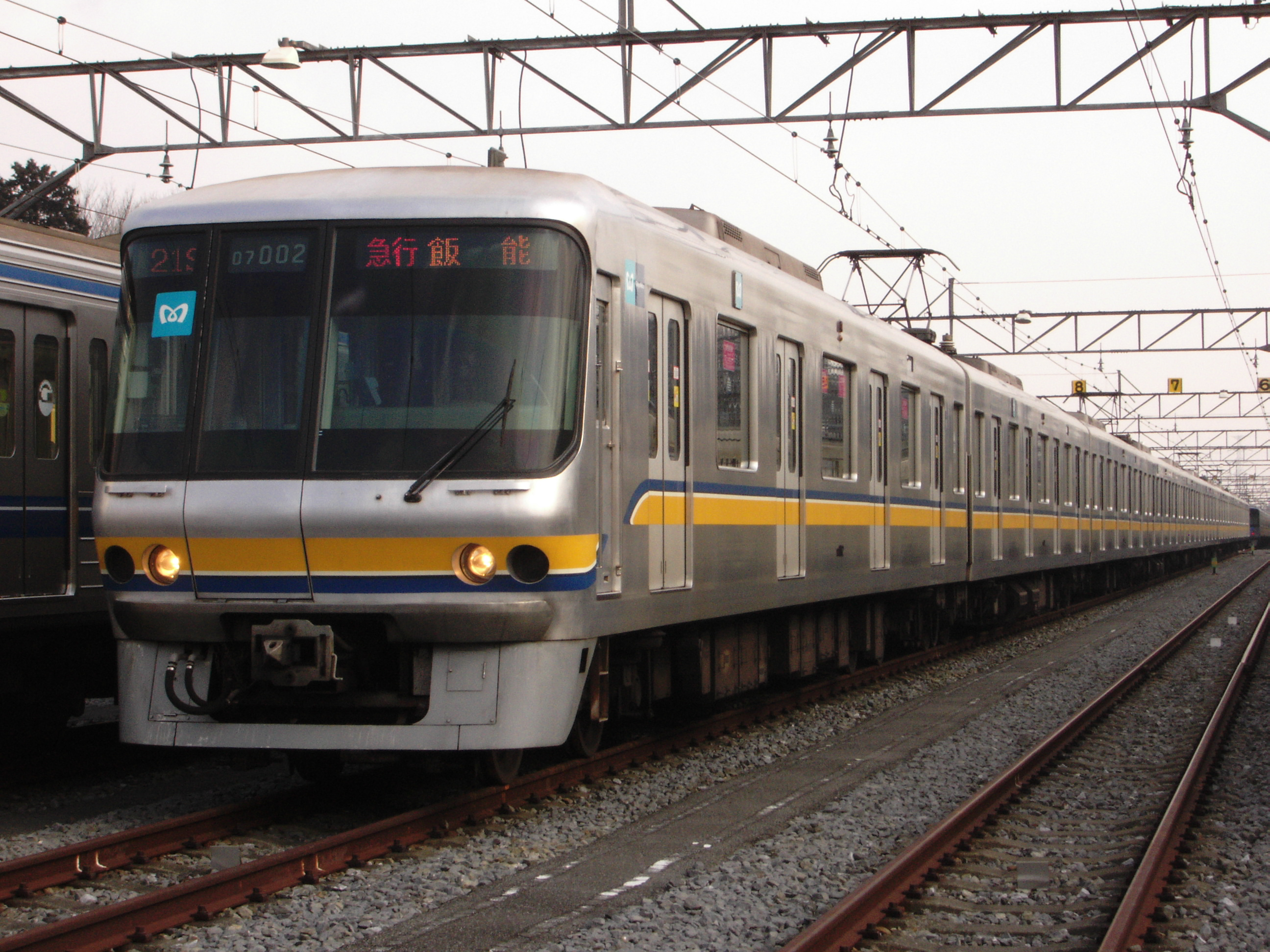
A Tokyo Metro 07 series EMU

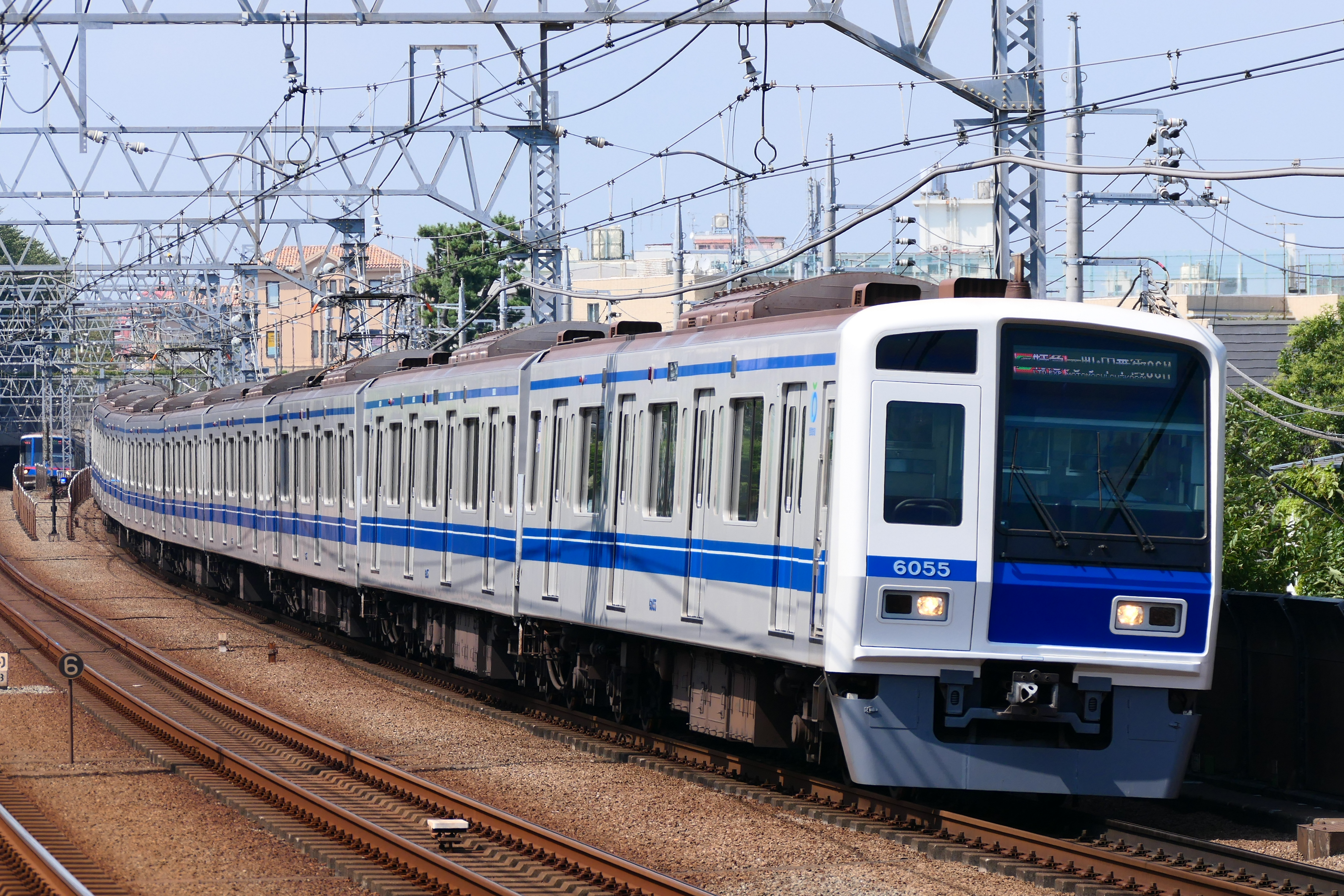
Seibu 6050 series EMU

== Depots ==
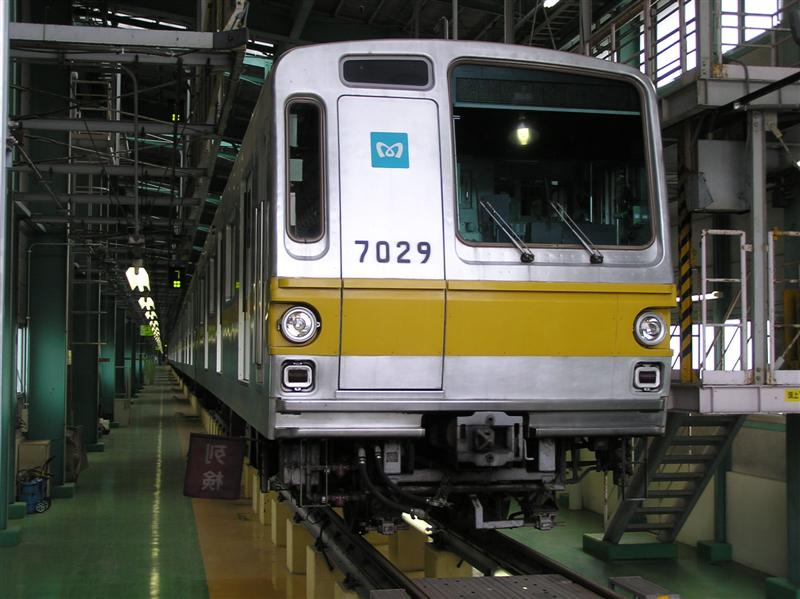
A 7000 series undergoing inspection at Shin-Kiba Depot

- Wakō Depot (和光検車区) (main depot)
- Shin-Kiba Depot (新木場検車区) (responsible for minor inspections; for major ones, EMUs are forwarded to the Ayase Depot (綾瀬車両基地) on the Chiyoda Line via underground connecting tracks)
- Shin-Kiba Car Renewal (新木場CR) (specializes in railcar refurbishment: also used for Chiyoda and Hanzōmon Line railcars)

== Future developments ==
In 2021, plans were announced to branch the Yūrakuchō Line at Toyosu Station, traveling north for 5.2 km (3.2 mi) connecting with Toyocho on the Tozai Line and Sumiyoshi Station on the Shinjuku Line and Hanzōmon Line. An additional two stations (Edagawa and Sengoku) would also be added in the Koto Ward serving the Sengoku and Toyo districts. Tentative names for the new stations were determined in August 2022. The branch line (nicknamed the Toyozumi Line according to official city documents) is intended to aid in redevelopment efforts in Koto Ward. As of 28 January 2022 the expected cost of construction is ¥269 billion (2021). There are also plans for a spur branching off from the planned Tokyo Rinkai Subway line at Kachidoki to link up to the future Toyozumi Line (Yūrakuchō Line branch) platforms at Toyosu Station. The branch line is expected to be in service in the mid-2030s.

On 17 April 2025, Tokyo Metro and Tobu Railway announced plans to introduce through services via the Yūrakuchō Line branch and Hanzōmon Line to Tobu's Skytree, Isesaki, and Nikko lines.

No.	Station (tentative)	Japanese	Distance (km) Between stations	Transfers	Location
	Toyosu	豊洲	0000	Yūrakuchō Line (Y-22; for Wakoshi and Shin-Kiba; some trains through); Yurikamome (U-16)	Kōtō
	Edagawa	枝川	0000		Kōtō
	Toyocho	東陽町	1.6	Tōzai Line (T-14)	Kōtō
	Sengoku	千石	0.9		Kōtō
	Sumiyoshi	住吉	0.9	Hanzōmon Line (Z-12); Shinjuku Line (S-13)	Kōtō

A branch line from Toyosu Station has been planned since the early 1980s, heading north via Kameari Station (on the Jōban Line) to Noda in northwest Chiba Prefecture.
