= Higashi-ikebukuro-yonchōme Station =

Tram station in Tokyo, Japan

Coordinates: 35°43′30.8208″N 139°43′12.6984″E

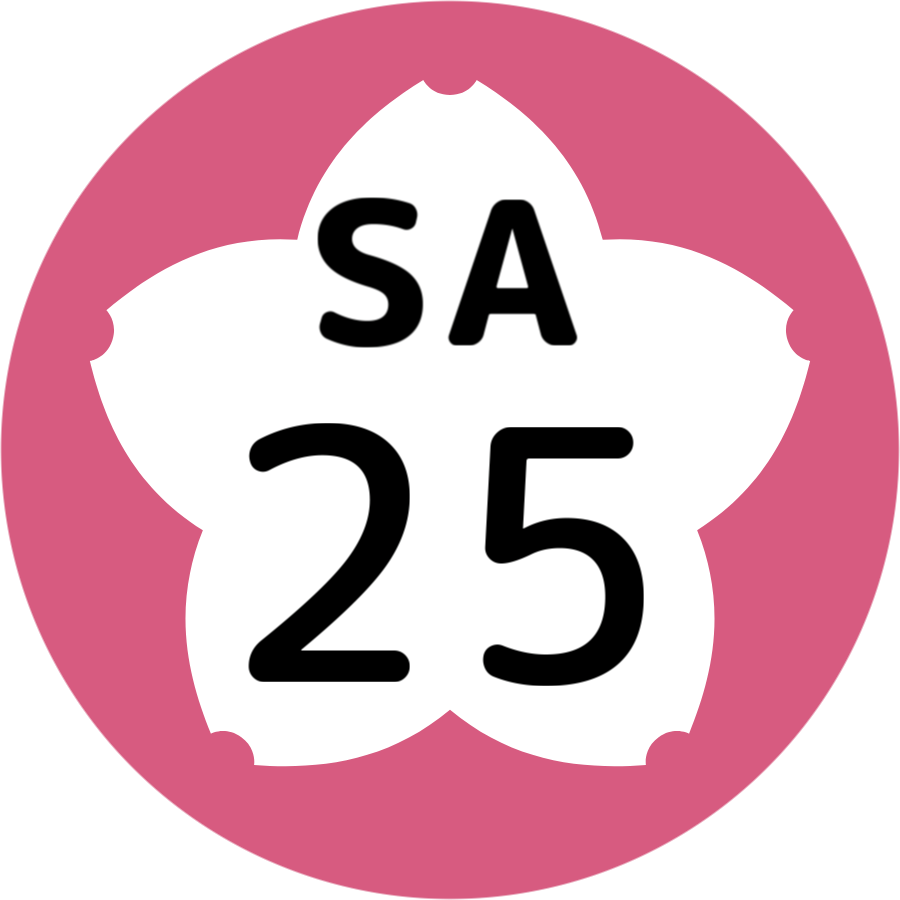
Higashi-ikebukuro-yonchōme Station 東池袋四丁目停留場

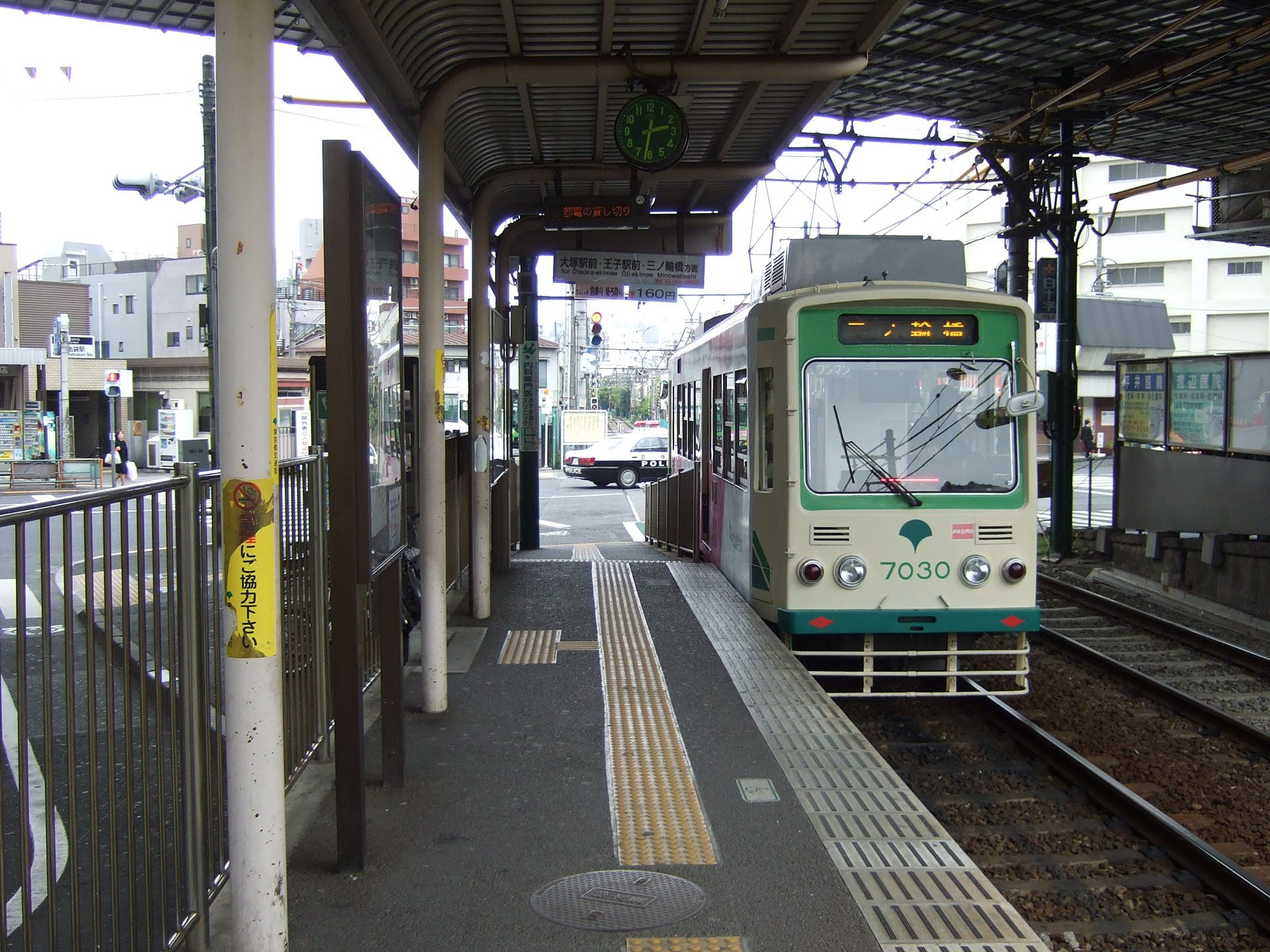
- Toden 7000 series tram at Higashi-ikebukuro-yonchōme Station, April 2008

General information
- Location: 4-chome, Higashi-ikebukuro,Toshima Ward, Tokyo; Japan
- Operator: Toei
- Line: Toden Arakawa Line
- Platforms: 2 side platforms
- Tracks: 2

Construction
- Structure type: At grade

Other information
- Station code: SA25

History
- Opened: 12 November 1925; 100 years ago

Services
Preceding station	Toei	Following station
Toden-zoshigaya towards Waseda	Toden Arakawa Line	Mukōhara towards Minowabashi
Location
- Location within Special wards of Tokyo Location within Tokyo Bay and Bōsō Peninsula Location within Tokyo Location within Japan

Higashi-ikebukuro-yonchōme Station (東池袋四丁目停留場, Higashi-Ikebukuro-yonchōme-Teiryūjyō) is a tram station located in Toshima, Tokyo, Japan. It opened on December 12, 1925. On maps, it is marked as an interchange with the Tokyo Metro Yurakucho Line at Higashi-ikebukuro Station.

== Lines ==
This stop is served by the Tokyo Sakura Tram operated by Tokyo Metropolitan Bureau of Transportation (Toei).
