= Sakuradamon Station =

Metro station in Tokyo, Japan

Coordinates: 35°40′38.47″N 139°45′6.39″E

Sakuradamon Station 桜田門駅

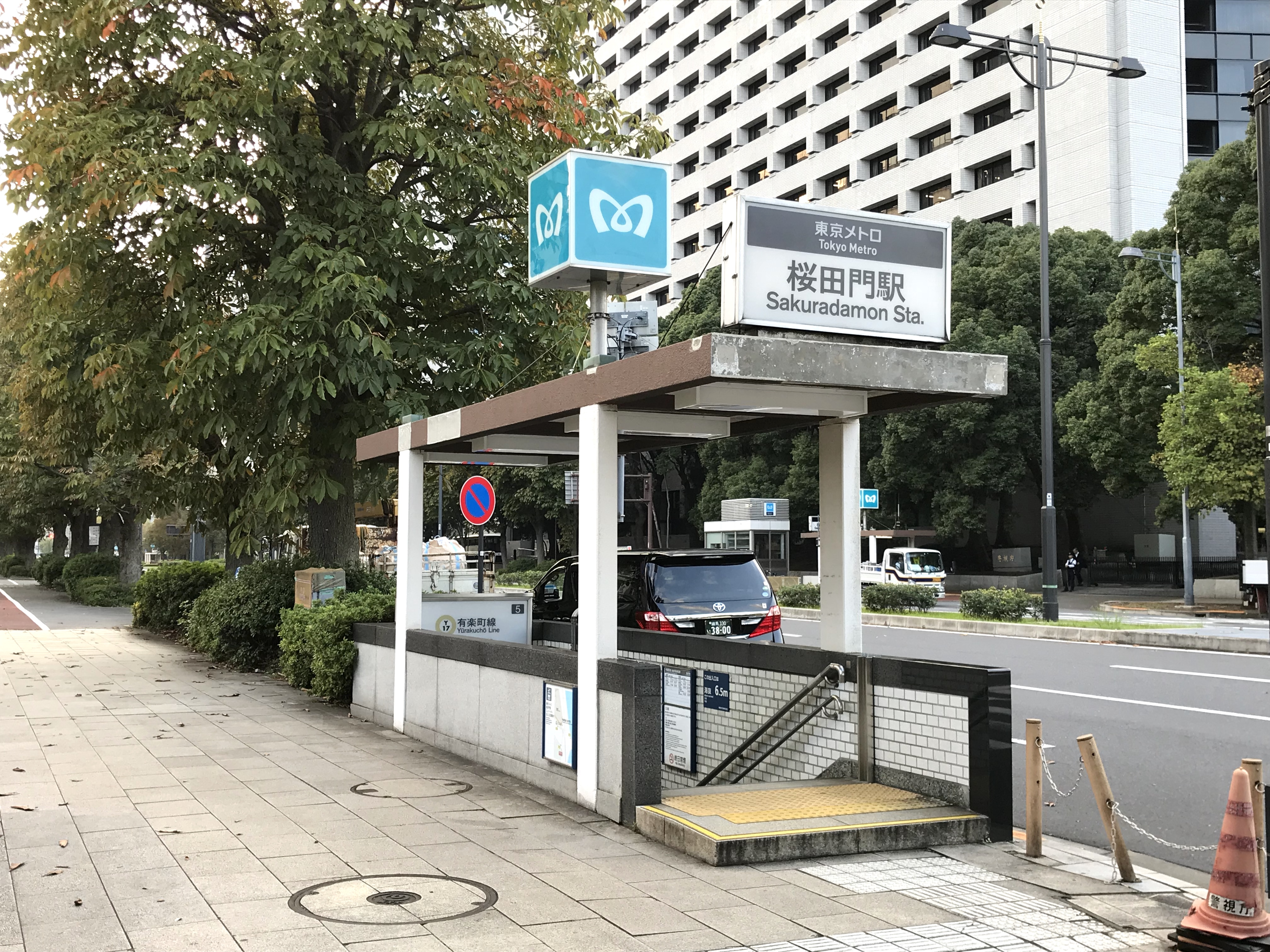
- Entrance of Sakuradamon Station

Japanese name
- Shinjitai: 桜田門駅
- Kyūjitai: 櫻田門驛
- Hiragana: さくらだもんえき

General information
- Location: 2-1-1 Kasumigaseki, Chiyoda, Tokyo （東京都千代田区霞が関2-1-1） Japan
- Operator: Tokyo Metro
- Line: Yūrakuchō Line
- Platforms: 1 island platform
- Tracks: 2

Construction
- Structure type: Underground

Other information
- Station code: Y-17

History
- Opened: 30 October 1974; 52 years ago

Passengers
- FY2013: 13,566 daily

Services
| Preceding station | Tokyo Metro | Following station |
|---|---|---|
| Nagatachō towards Wakoshi | Yūrakuchō Line | Yūrakuchō towards Shin-kiba |
Location
- Location within Tokyo Yamanote Loop Location within Tokyo wards area Location within Japan

Sakuradamon Station (桜田門駅, Sakuradamon-eki) is a subway station on the Tokyo Metro Yūrakuchō Line in Chiyoda, Tokyo, Japan, operated by the Tokyo subway operator Tokyo Metro. It is numbered Y-17. It is the closest train station to the Tokyo Imperial Palace, adjacent to the Sakurada gate.

== Lines ==
Sakuradamon Station is served by the Tokyo Metro Yūrakuchō Line from Wakōshi in Saitama Prefecture to Shin-Kiba in Tokyo, and is located 20.2 km (12.6 mi) from the line's starting point at Wakōshi. Through services operate to and from the Tobu Tojo Line and Seibu Ikebukuro Line.

== Station layout ==
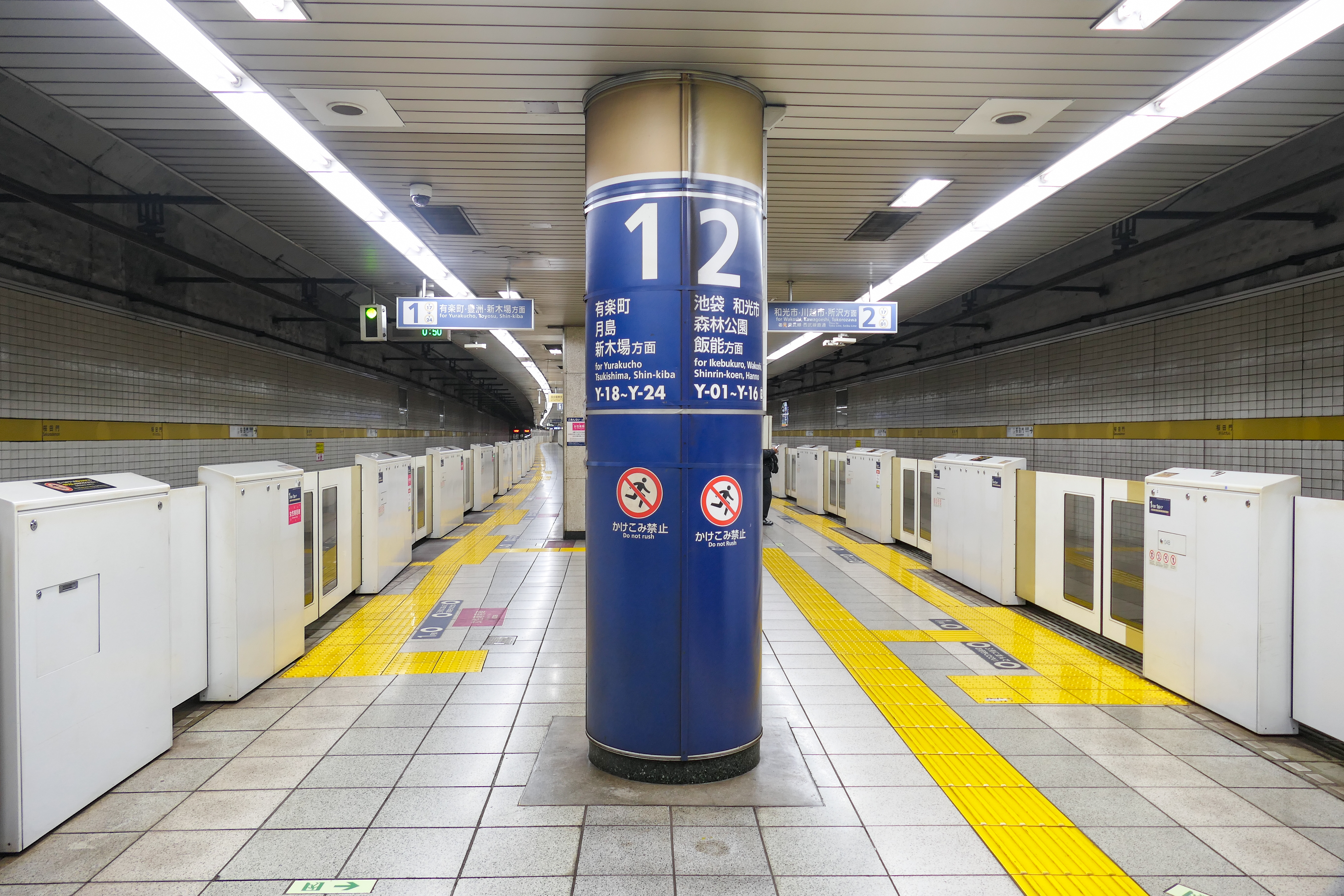
View of the platforms, with chest-high platform edge doors, March 2023

The station consists of an island platform located on the second basement ("B2F") level, serving two tracks.

=== Platforms ===
| 1 | Yūrakuchō Line | for Yurakucho, Toyosu and Shin-Kiba |
| 2 | Yūrakuchō Line | for Ikebukuro, Kotake-mukaihara, and Wakoshi; Tobu Tojo Line for Shinrinkōen; Seibu Ikebukuro Line for Hannō |

== History ==
The station was opened on 30 October 1974 by the Teito Rapid Transit Authority (TRTA).

== Passenger statistics ==
In fiscal 2013, the station was the least used on the Yūrakuchō line and the 128th busiest on the Tokyo Metro network with an average of 13,566 passengers daily.

| Fiscal year | Daily average |
|---|---|
| 2010 | 13,348 |
| 2011 | 13,062 |
| 2012 | 13,517 |
| 2013 | 13,566 |

== Surrounding area ==
- Imperial Palace
- Sakurada Gate
- Tokyo Metropolitan Police Department - "Sakurada Gate" is also synonymous with the Police Agency.
- National Diet Building
- Kasumigaseki Station ( Tokyo Metro Marunouchi Line, Tokyo Metro Hibiya Line, Tokyo Metro Chiyoda Line)
