= Yūrakuchō Station =

Railway and metro station in Tokyo, Japan

Coordinates: 35.674877°N 139.763646°E

JK25 JY30 Yūrakuchō Station 有楽町駅

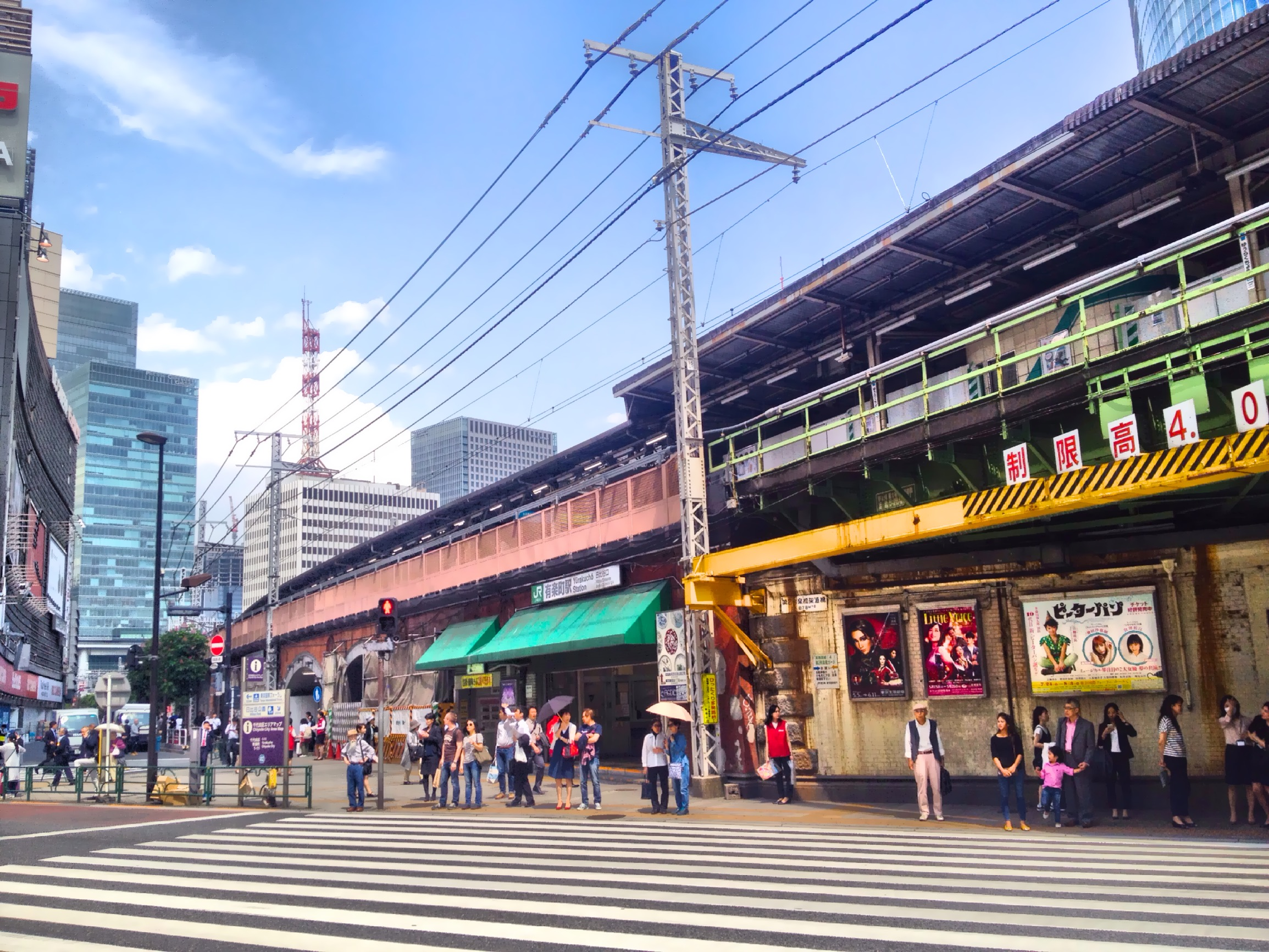
- Yūrakuchō Station Hibiya entrance in May 2017

Japanese name
- Shinjitai: 有楽町駅
- Kyūjitai: 有樂町驛
- Hiragana: ゆうらくちょうえき

General information
- Location: Chiyoda-ku, Tokyo; Japan
- Operator: JR East; Tokyo Metro
- Lines: Yamanote Line; Keihin-Tōhoku Line; Yūrakuchō Line (Y-18)
- Connections: Hibiya

Other information
- Station code: Y-18 JK-25 JY-30

History
- Opened: 25 June 1910; 116 years ago

Passengers
- FY2024: 253,744 daily; 139,041 daily

Services
Preceding station	JR East	Following station
Shimbashi Next clockwise	Yamanote Line	Tokyo Next counter-clockwise
Shimbashi towards Yokohama	Keihin–Tōhoku Line Local	Tokyo towards Ōmiya
Preceding station	Tokyo Metro	Following station
Iidabashi towards Kotesashi	S-Train (weekdays)	Toyosu Terminus
Sakuradamon towards Wakoshi	Yūrakuchō Line	Ginza-itchōme towards Shin-kiba
Location
- Location within Tokyo Yamanote Loop Location within Tokyo wards area Location within Japan

Yūrakuchō Station (有楽町駅, Yūrakuchō-eki) is a railway station in the Yūrakuchō district of Chiyoda, Tokyo, Japan, operated by East Japan Railway Company (JR East) and the Tokyo subway operator Tokyo Metro. It was Tokyo Metro's fifteenth busiest station in 2016.

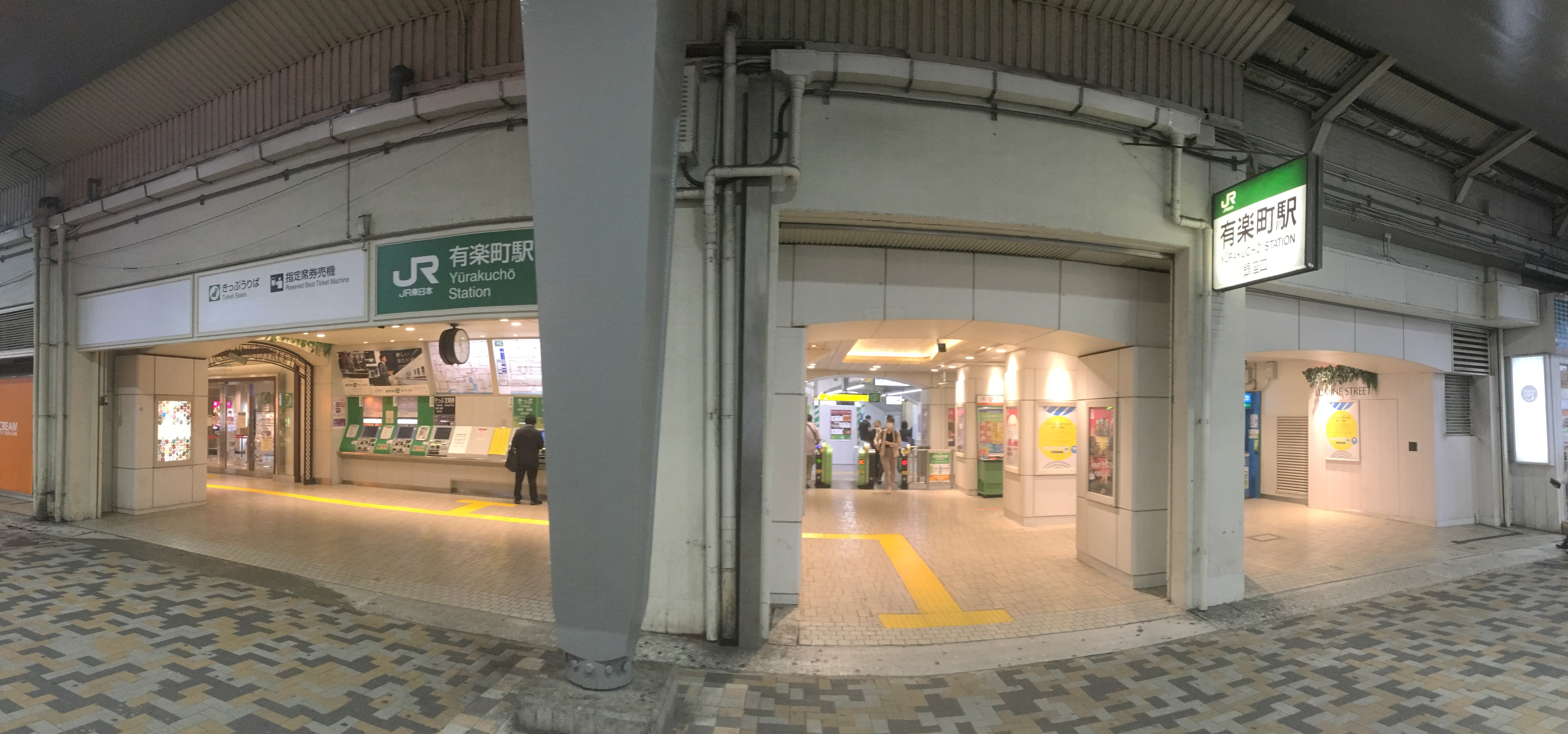
JR Yūrakuchō Station Ginza exit, 2020

== Lines ==
Yūrakuchō is served by the JR East Keihin-Tōhoku Line and Yamanote Line, and the Tokyo Metro Yūrakuchō Line subway. On Tokyo subway maps, nearby Hibiya Station is marked as an interchange and is linked to Yurakucho by underground passages.

== Platforms ==
=== JR East platforms ===
1	Keihin-Tohoku Line	for Tokyo, Ueno, Akabane, and Ōmiya
2	Yamanote Line	for Tokyo, Ueno and Ikebukuro
3	Yamanote Line	for Shinagawa, and Shibuya
4	Keihin-Tohoku Line	for Shinagawa, Yokohama, and Ōfuna

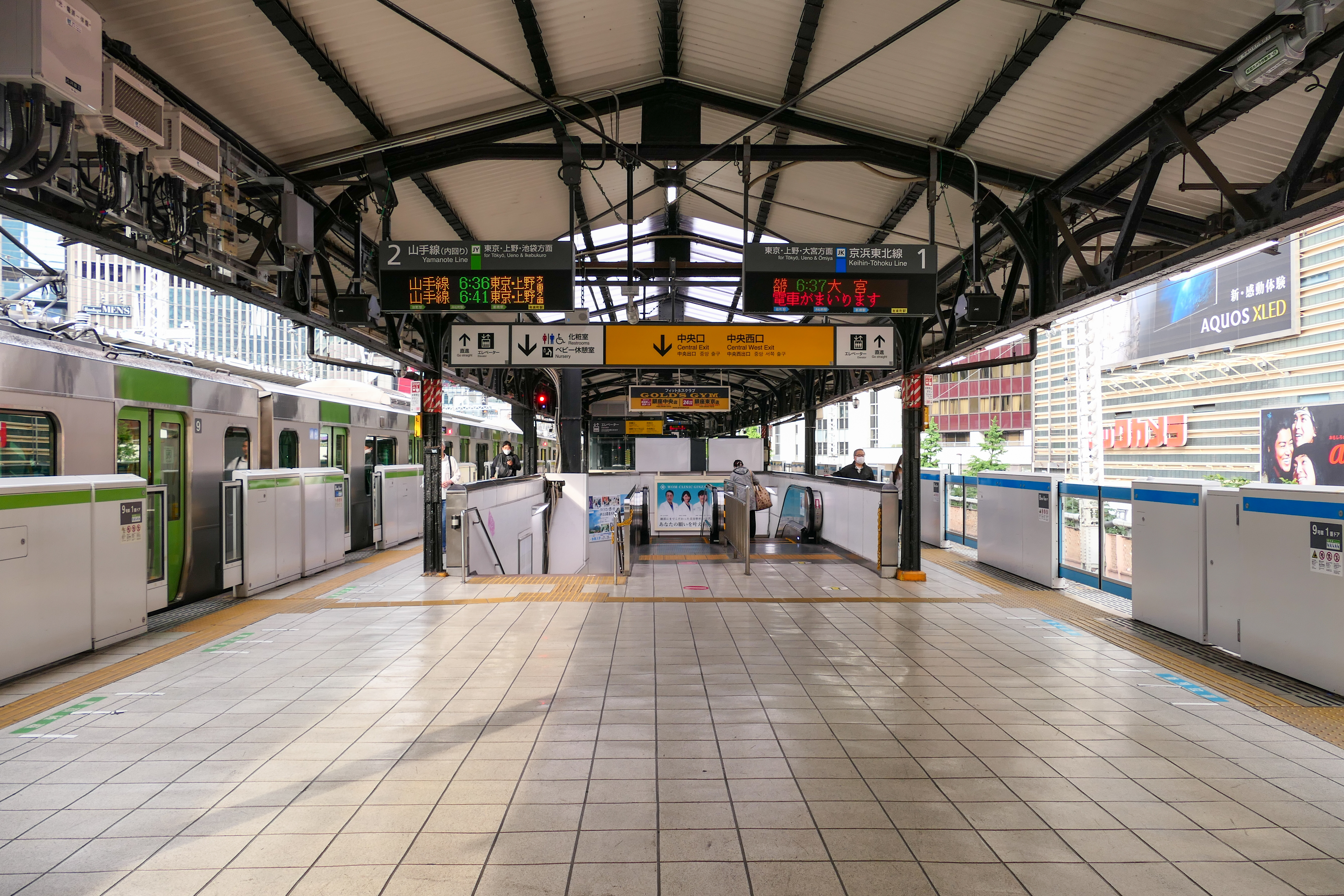
Platforms 1 and 2

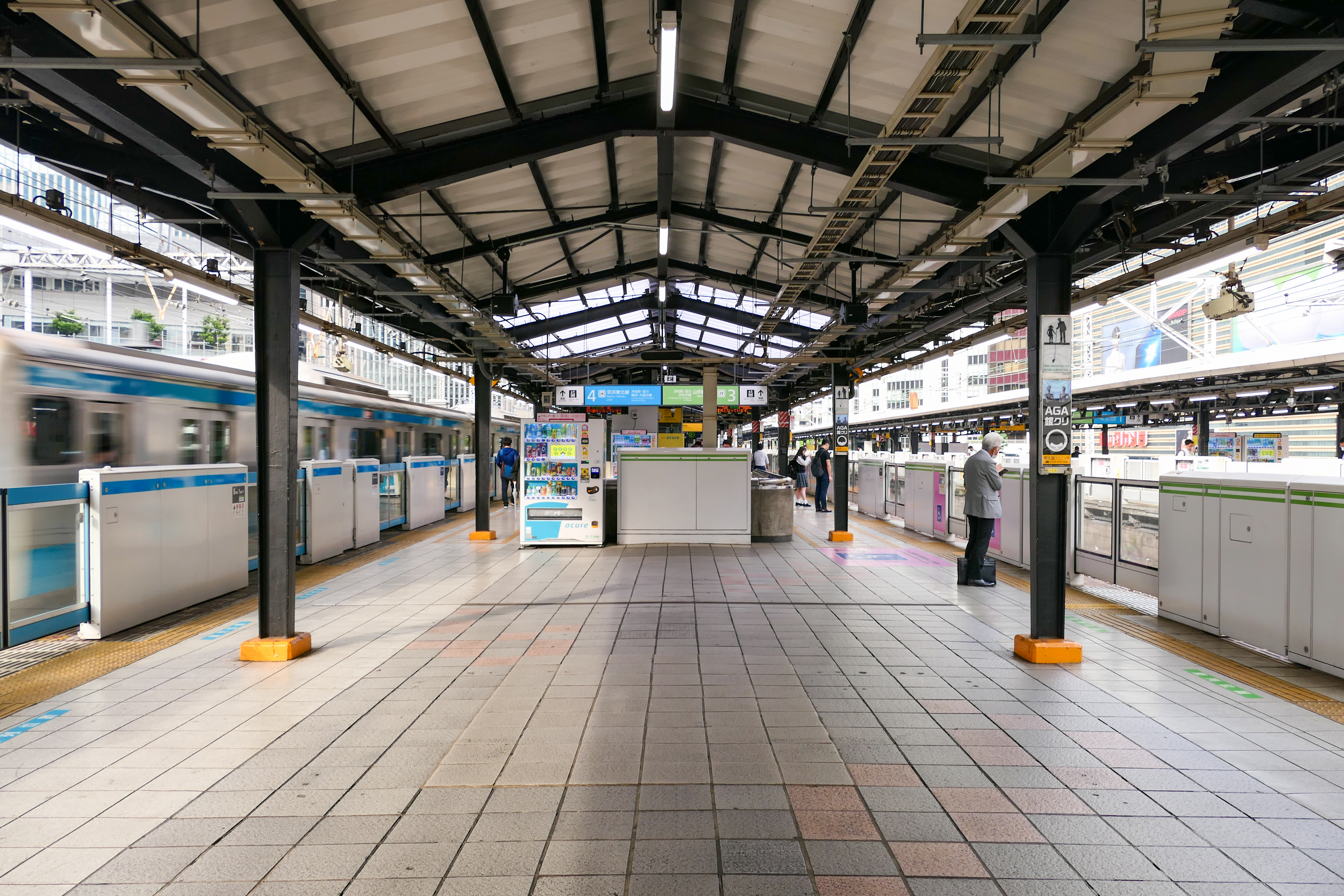
Platforms 3 and 4

=== Tokyo Metro platforms ===
1	Yūrakuchō Line	for Tsukishima, Toyosu and Shin-Kiba
2	Yūrakuchō Line	for Iidabashi and Ikebukuro; Seibu Ikebukuro Line for Hannō; Tobu Tojo Line for Shinrin-kōen

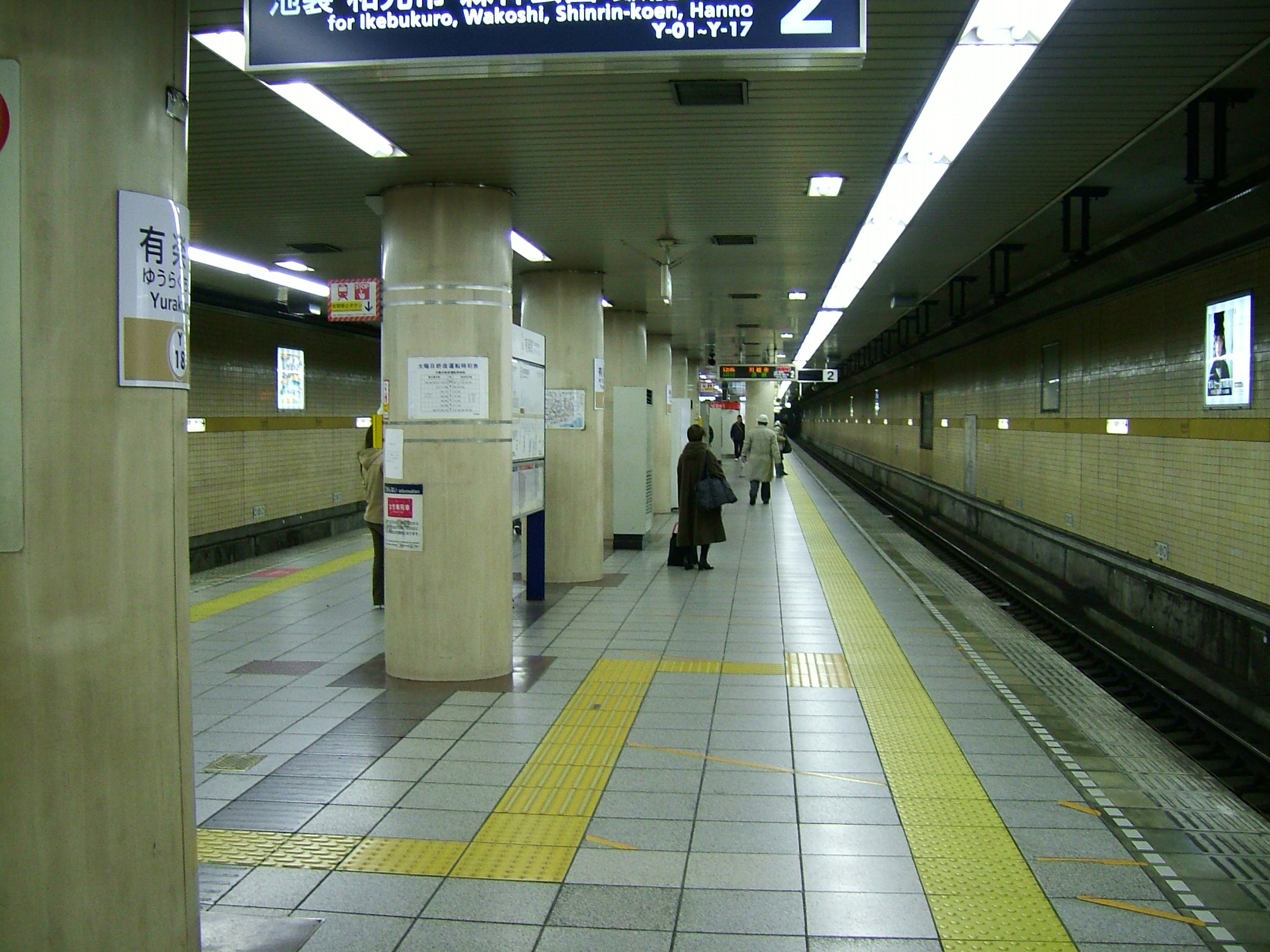
Yurakucho Line platforms

== History ==
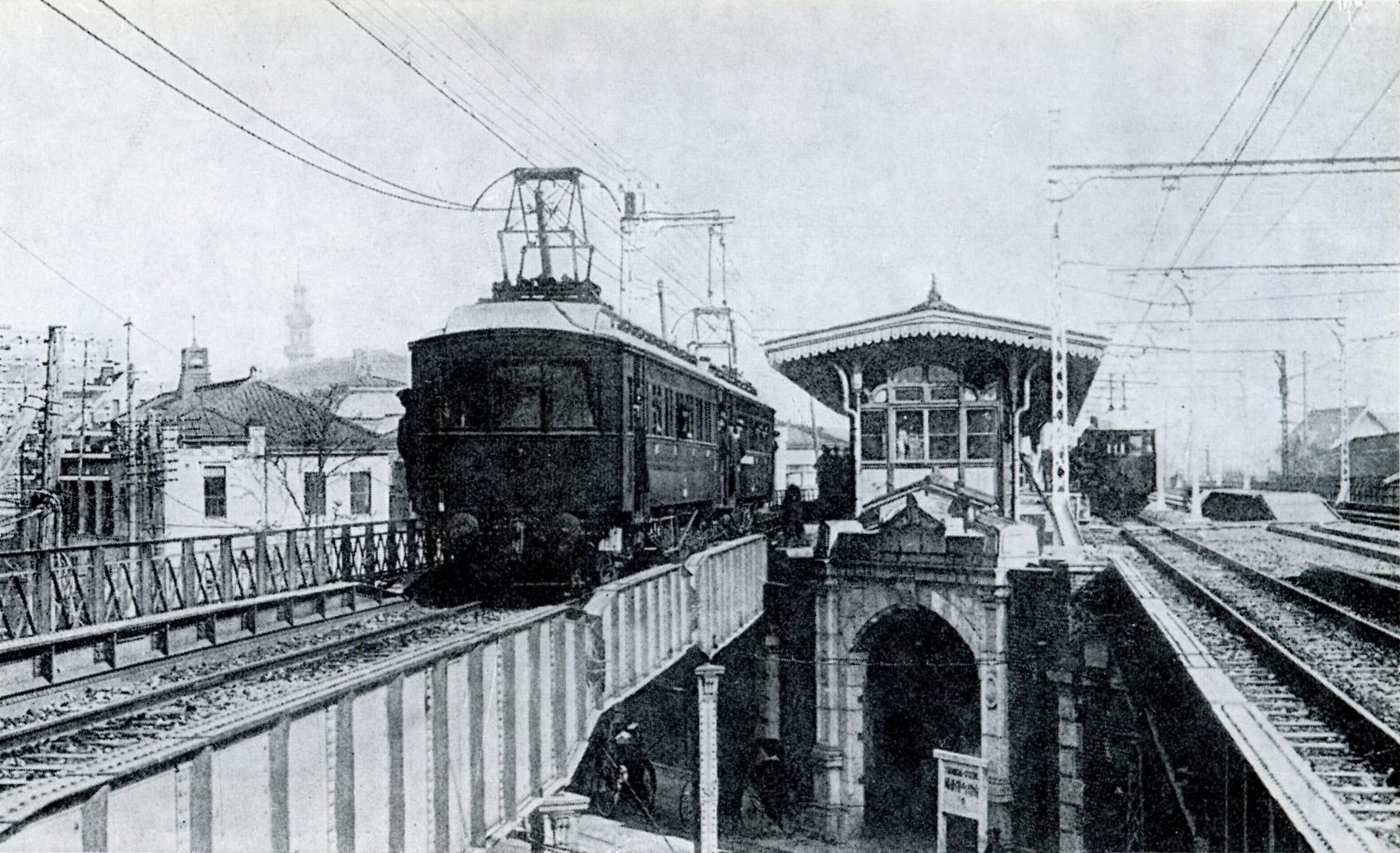
Yūrakuchō station in 1914

The elevated JR station opened on June 25, 1910. The subway station was opened on October 30, 1974 by the Teito Rapid Transit Authority (TRTA).

Chest-high platform edge doors were installed on the Yamanote Line platforms in July 2014, with operation scheduled to begin on 30 August 2014.

== Passenger statistics ==
In fiscal 2013, the JR East station was used by an average of 167,365 passengers daily (boarding passengers only), making it the fourteenth-busiest station operated by JR East. In fiscal 2013, the Tokyo Metro station was used by an average of 158,809 passengers per day (exiting and entering passengers), making it the sixteenth-busiest station operated by Tokyo Metro. The average daily passenger figures for each operator in previous years are as shown below.

Fiscal year	JR East	Tokyo Metro
1999	160,126	
2000	156,273	
2005	153,113	
2010	162,445	
2011	162,252	147,303
2012	164,929	152,102
2013	167,365	158,809

- Note that JR East figures are for boarding passengers only.

== See also ==
- List of railway stations in Japan
