= Nerima =

Special ward in Tokyo, Japan

Nerima 練馬区
- Special ward
- Nerima Ward / Nerima City
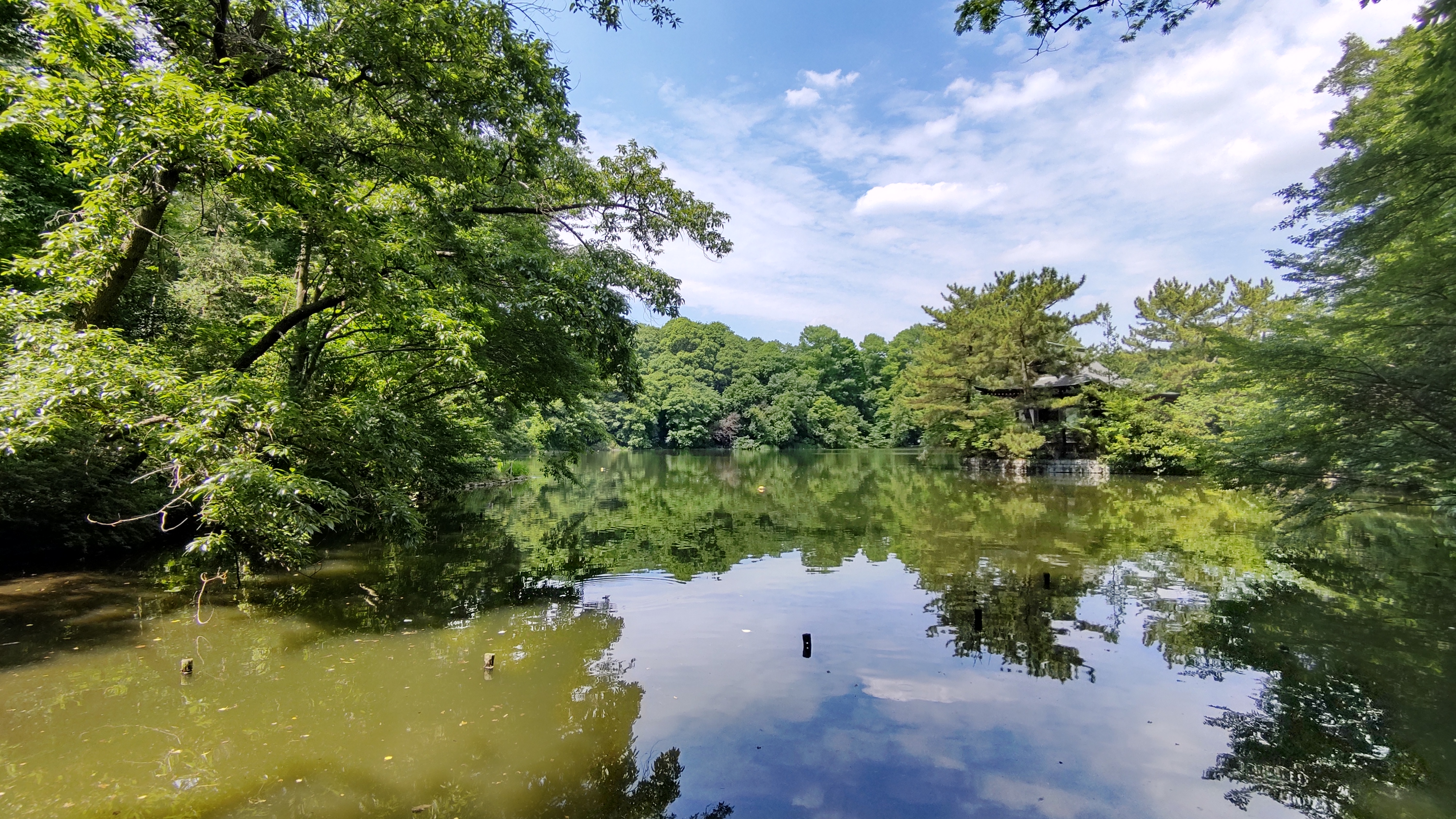
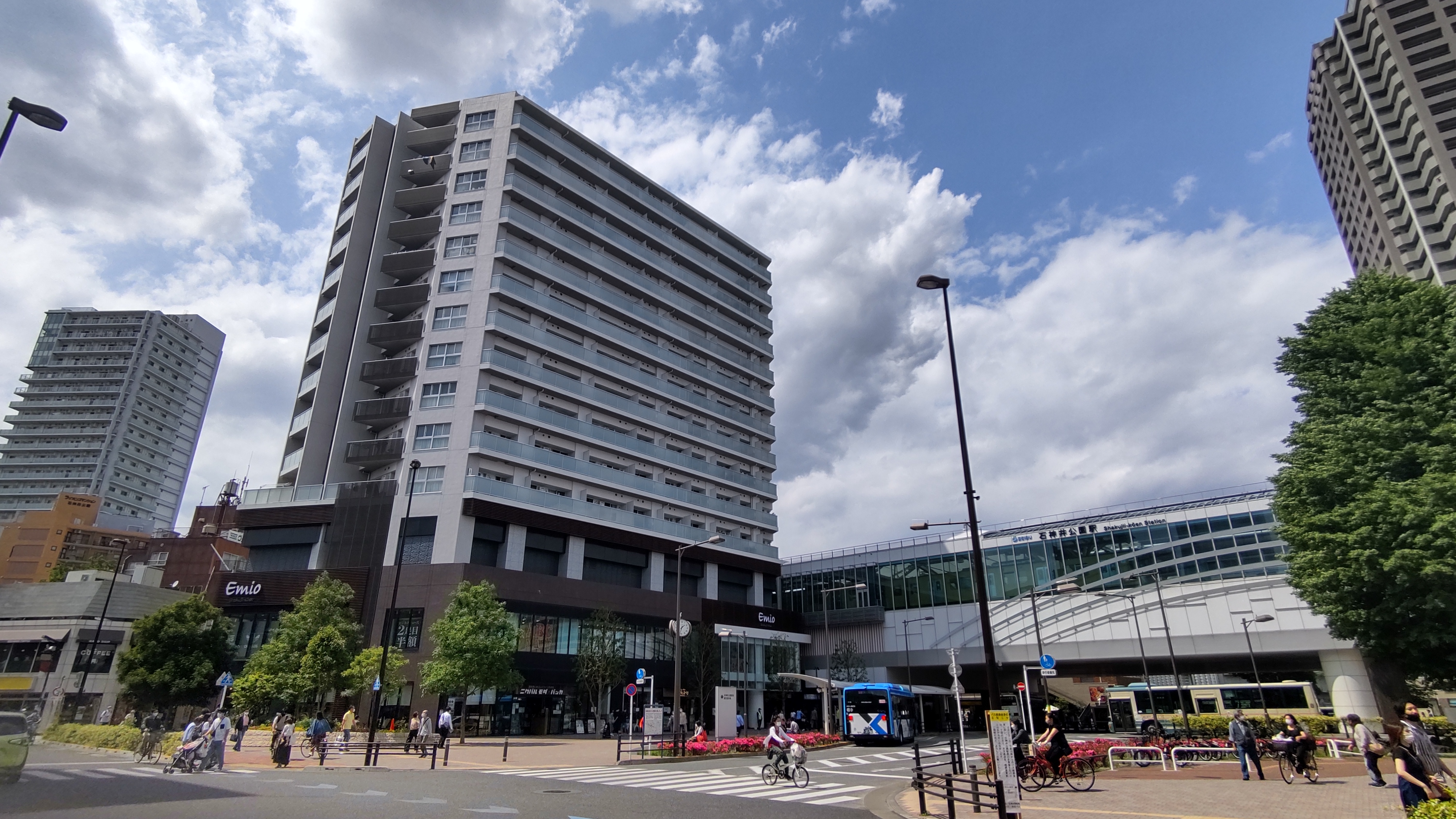
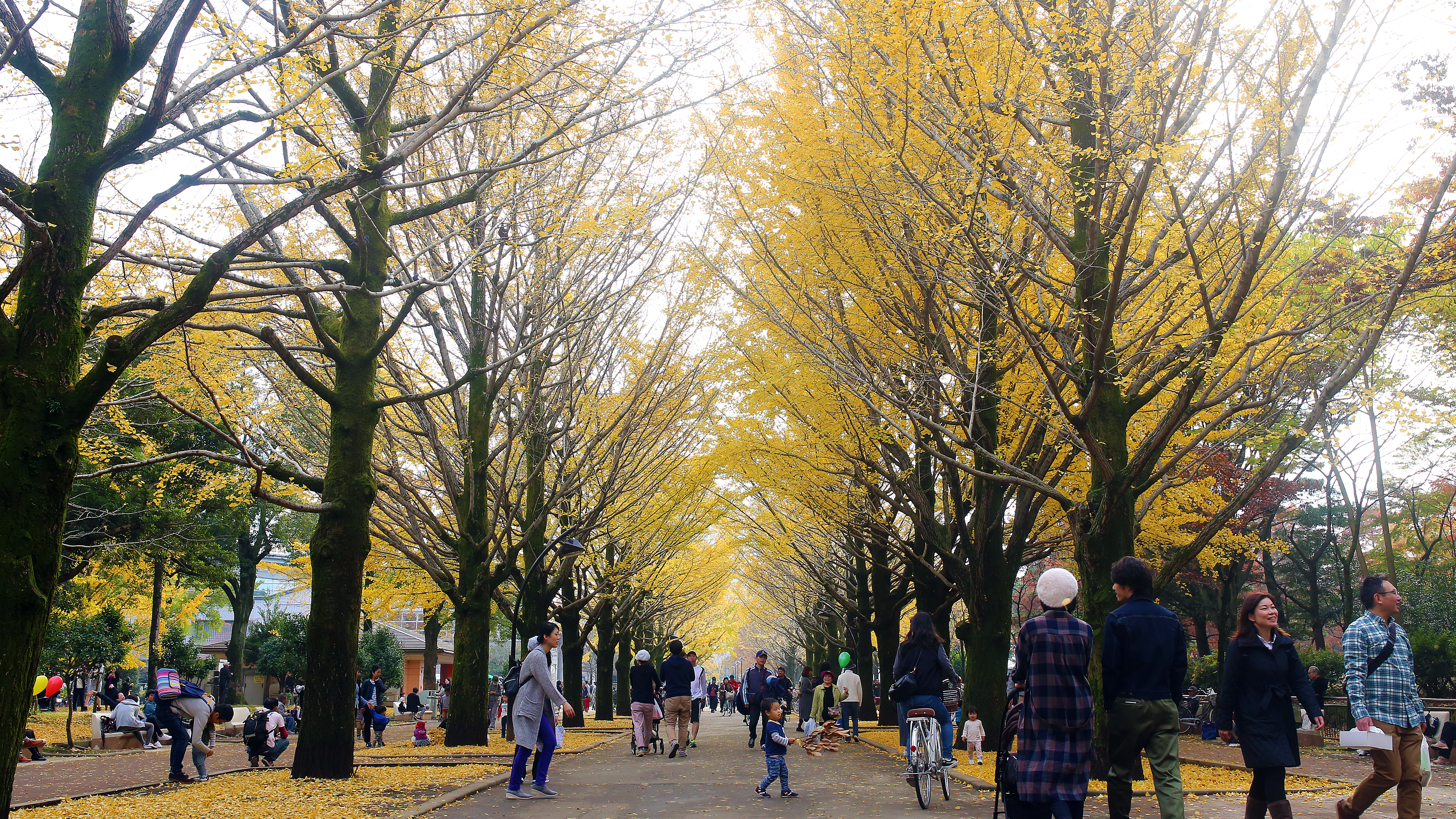
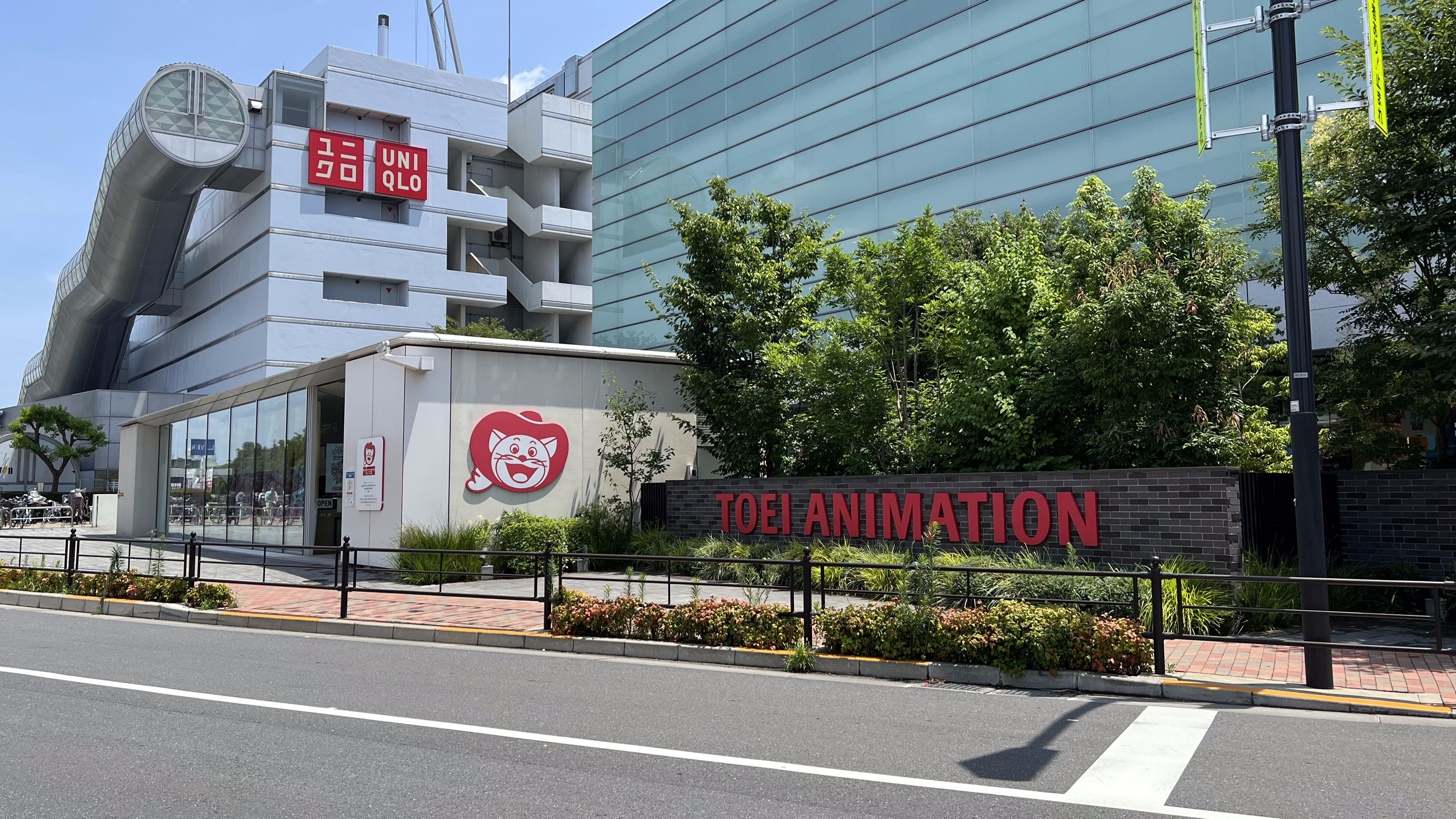
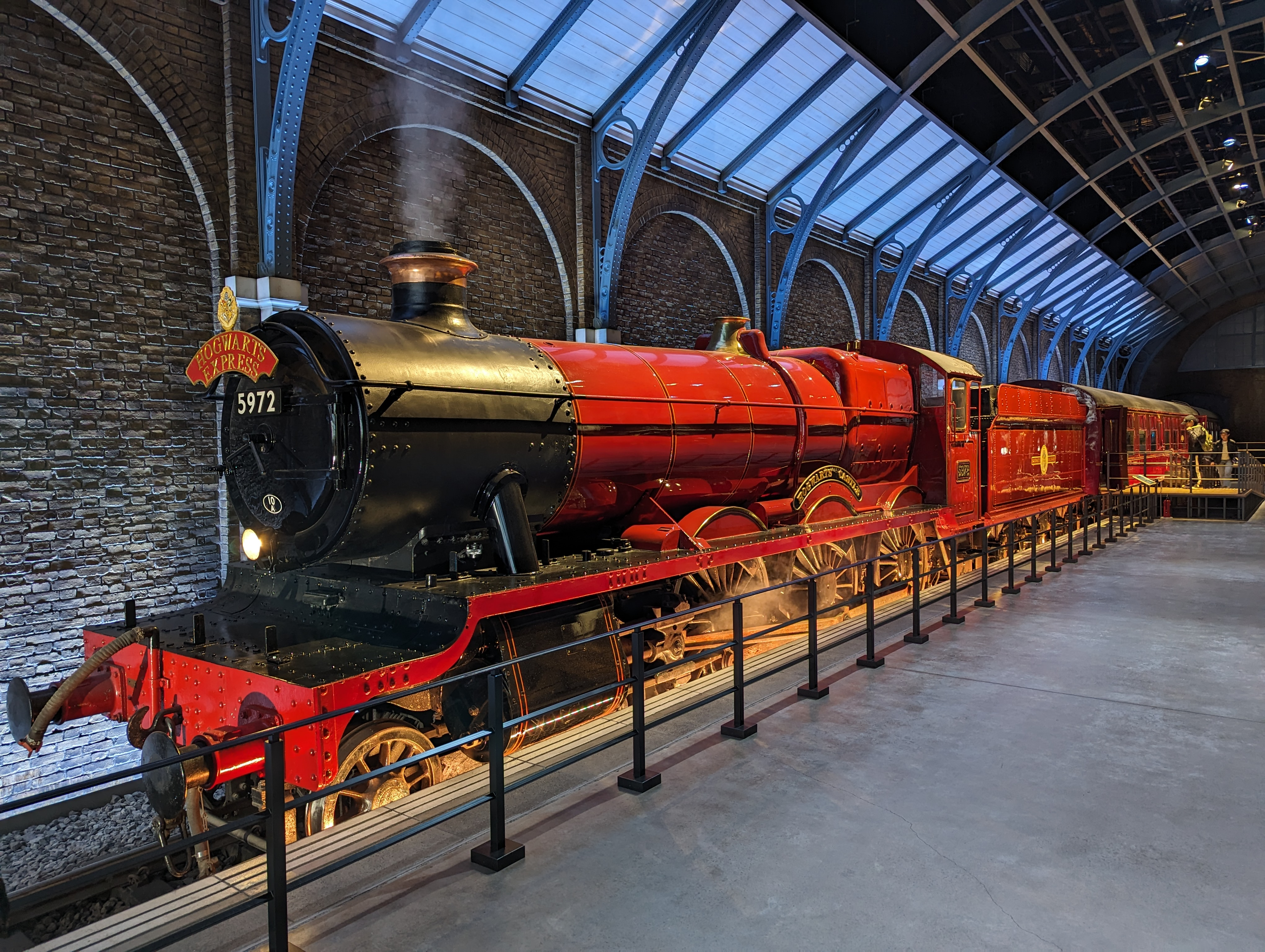

- Flag Seal

- Location of Nerima in the Wards Area of Tokyo

- Location in Japan
- Coordinates: 35°44′8.24″N 139°39′5.97″E
- Country: Japan
- Region: Kantō
- Prefecture: Tokyo

Government
  - Ward Mayor (区長, kuchō): Kenichi Yoshida (吉田健一) (since April 2026)

Area
  - Total: 48.08 km^{2} (18.56 sq mi)

Population (1 June 2025)
  - Total: 749,451
  - Density: 15,591/km^{2} (40,380/sq mi)
- Time zone: UTC+09:00 (JST)
- City hall address: 6-12-1 Toyotama-Kita, Nerima Ward, Tokyo 〒176-8501
- Climate: Cfa
- Website: www.city.nerima.tokyo.jp
- Symbols
- Flower: Azalea
- Tree: Kobushi Magnolia

Nerima (練馬区, Nerima-ku; Japanese pronunciation: [nè̞.ɾʲí.mä́(.kɯ̈̀), né̞.ɾʲì.mä̀]) is one of the 23 special wards of Tokyo, Japan. It is mainly a residential ward, located in the northwest of the Wards Area of Tokyo (東京都区部, Tōkyō-to kubu). It split from Itabashi Ward on August 1, 1947, making it the newest of the 23 wards. It ranks 20th in official ward order under the Local Government Code of Japan, where it is assigned code 13120.

Nerima Ward is nicknamed "the town of animation" (アニメのまち, Anime no Machi), because the earliest anime studios started up in the ward, like Toei Animation and Osamu Tezuka's Mushi Production, making it the birthplace of anime, of the first color anime feature film The White Snake Enchantress, and of the first anime TV series Astro Boy. As of 2007, Nerima has the largest concentration of anime studios in Japan, followed by the neighboring Suginami Ward. Nerima has also served as the setting for several popular anime and manga series, including Doraemon, Ranma ½, Maison Ikkoku, Urusei Yatsura, Tokyo Ghoul, and Digimon Adventure.

As of 1 June 2025, the ward has an estimated total population of 749,451 people. It has 399,800 households, and 21.6% of the ward's population is elderly (over the age of 65). The total area of the ward is 48.08 km^{2}, which gives a population density of 15,591 persons per km^{2}.

== Geography ==
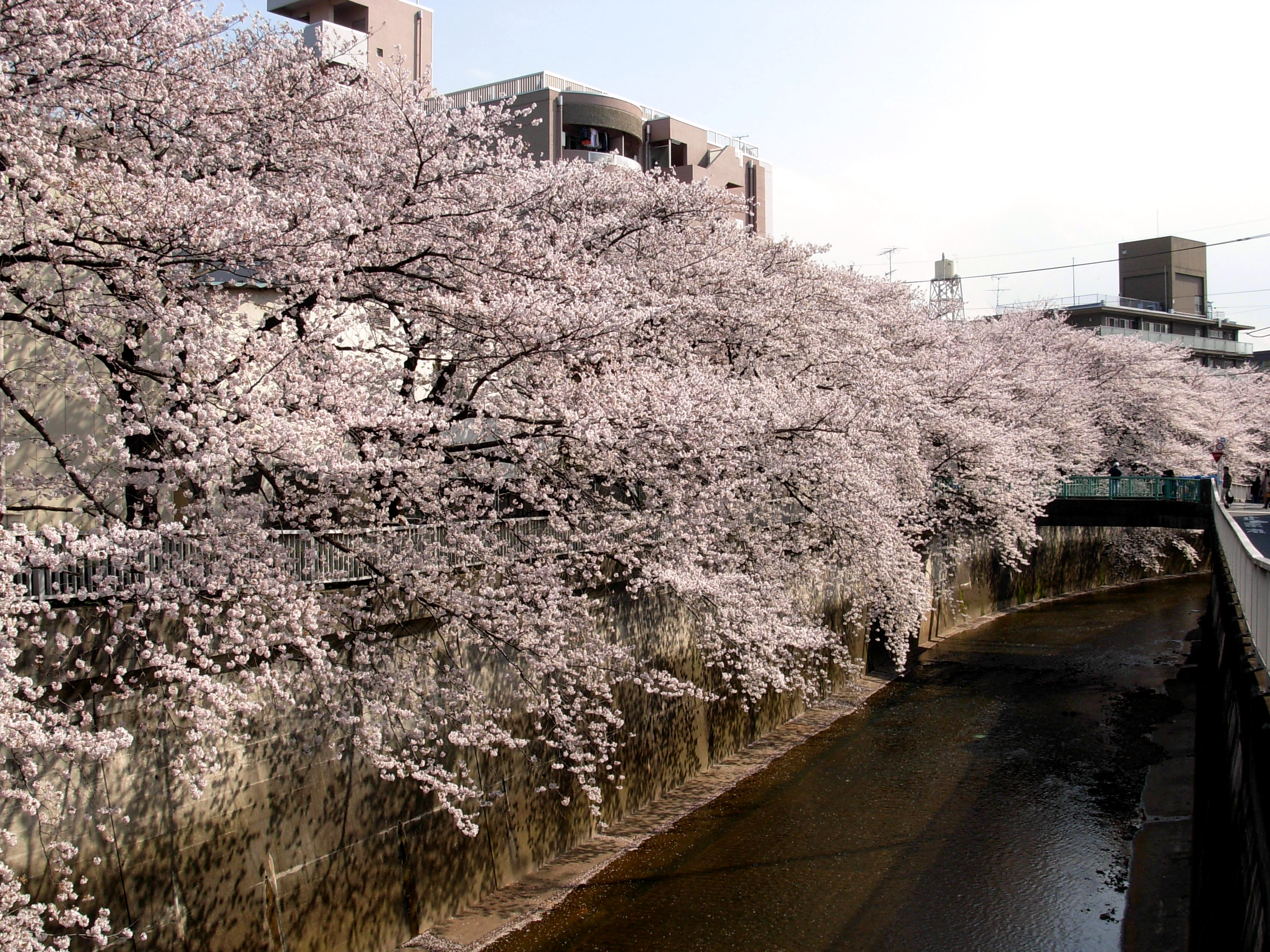
Shakujii River and cherry blossoms

Nerima is located within the Wards Area of Tokyo, in the north part of the West of the Palace area (城西エリア, Jōsai eria). Neighboring wards are Itabashi Ward (to the east), Toshima Ward (to the southeast), Suginami Ward, and Nakano Ward (to the south). To the west it neighbors two cities in the Tama Area of Tokyo: Musashino (to the southwest), and Nishitōkyō (to the west). To the north lie three cities in Saitama Prefecture: Wakō, Asaka and Niiza.

The ward is roughly rectangular, measuring 10km east to west and 4km to 7km north to south, with an area of 48.08km^{2}. It accounts for about 7.7% of the total area of the 23 wards, making it the 5th largest of the 23 wards.

To the northwest, there is a small exclave called Nishi-Ōizumimachi, enclaved within the city of Niiza in Saitama Prefecture. The ward is working to incorporate the exclave into Saitama Prefecture, but residents are opposed to the plan.

=== Terrain ===
The entire ward lies within the Musashino Plateau and features soil composed of loam formed from volcanic ash. The highest point in the 23 wards is in Nerima Ward, around Musashi-Seki Park. There are two peaks in the plateau at an altitude of about 58m in Sekimachi-Minami 4th Street and Sekimachi-Kita 4th Street.

=== Water bodies ===
The main rivers are the Shakujii River and the Shirako River, and the difference in elevation is small. The Senkawa Aqueduct flows through the ward. Groundwater from the Musashino Plateau surfaces as springs, creating the Sambōji Pond, Shakujii Pond, and Fujimi Pond.

In the past, the Naka-Arai River and the Tagara Irrigation Canal flowed through the ward, but have dried out since. Extinct ponds are the Nukui Pond and the Igashira Pond.

==== Rivers ====
- Shakujii River
- Shirako River

==== Ponds ====
- Sambōji Pond
- Shakujii Pond
- Fujimi Pond

==== Aqueducts ====
- Senkawa Aqueduct

==== Extinct water bodies ====
- Naka-Arai River
- Tagara Irrigation Canal
- Nukui Pond
- Igashira Pond

=== Neighborhoods ===
Nerima Ward has implemented an addressing system based on the Act on Residential Addresses (Act No. 119 of 10 May 1962) in most areas. Based on this system, the ward comprises 46 neighborhoods (町, machi), each further divided into numbered neighborhood blocks called chōme (丁目) or Streets, which have local neighborhood associations called chōnaikai (町内会).

The neighborhoods are as follows, arranged by postal code and postal area:

==== Nerima area ====
Neighborhood	Japanese Name	Date of Establishment	No. of Streets (丁目)	Zip Code
Nerima	練馬	1 February 1963	4	176-0001
Sakuradai	桜台	1 November 1987	6	176-0002
Hazawa	羽沢	1 January 1987	3	176-0003
Kotakechō	小竹町	1 January 1987	2	176-0004
Asahigaoka	旭丘	1 January 1987	2	176-0005
Sakaechō	栄町	1 January 1987	1	176-0006
Toyotama-Kami	豊玉上	1 January 1990	2	176-0011
Toyotama-Kita	豊玉北	1 January 1990	6	176-0012
Toyotama-Naka	豊玉中	1 January 1989	4	176-0013
Toyotama-Minami	豊玉南	1 January 1989	3	176-0014
Nukui	貫井	1 January 1965	5	176-0021
Kōyama	向山	1 April 1965	4	176-0022
Nakamura-Kita	中村北	1 September 1972	4	176-0023
Nakamura	中村	1 September 1972	3	176-0024
Nakamura-Minami	中村南	1 September 1972	3	176-0025

==== Shakujii area ====
Neighborhood	Japanese Name	Date of Establishment	No. of Streets (丁目)	Zip Code
Miharadai	三原台	1 August 1971	3	177-0031
Yahara	谷原	1 April 1965	6	177-0032
Takanodai	高野台	1 April 1965	5	177-0033
Fujimidai	富士見台	1 November 1964	4	177-0034
Minami-Tanaka	南田中	1 August 1973	5	177-0035
Shakujiimachi	石神井町	1 January 1970	7	177-0041
Shimo-Shakujii	下石神井	1 August 1973	6	177-0042
Kami-Shakujii-Minamichō	上石神井南町	1 June 1984	1	177-0043
Kami-Shakujii	上石神井	1 June 1985	4	177-0044
Shakujiidai	石神井台	1 July 1970	8	177-0045
Sekimachi-Kita	関町北	1 January 1978	5	177-0051
Sekimachi-Higashi	関町東	1 June 1985	2	177-0052
Sekimachi-Minami	関町南	1 June 1984	4	177-0053
Tatenochō	立野町	1 June 1984	1	177-0054

==== Ōizumi area ====
Neighborhood	Japanese Name	Date of Establishment	No. of Streets (丁目)	Zip Code
Ōizumi-Gakuenchō	大泉学園町	1 December 1982	9	178-0061
Ōizumimachi	大泉町	1 January 1980	6	178-0062
Higashi-Ōizumi	東大泉	1 August 1980	7	178-0063
Minami-Ōizumi	南大泉	1 August 1981	6	178-0064
Nishi-Ōizumi	西大泉	1 August 1981	6	178-0065
Nishi-Ōizumimachi	西大泉町	Address system not implemented	1	178-0066

==== Hikarigaoka area ====
Neighborhood	Japanese Name	Date of Establishment	No. of Streets (丁目)	Zip Code
Asahichō	旭町	1 October 1968	3	179-0071
Hikarigaoka	光が丘	1 March 1983	7	179-0072
Tagara	田柄	1 October 1967	5	179-0073
Kasugachō	春日町	1 January 1967	6	179-0074
Takamatsu	高松	1 September 1969	6	179-0075
Doshida	土支田	1 January 1975	4	179-0076
Kitamachi	北町	1 June 1966	8	179-0081
Nishiki	錦	1 July 1965	2	179-0082
Heiwadai	平和台	1 July 1965	4	179-0083
Hikawadai	氷川台	1 July 1965	4	179-0084
Hayamiya	早宮	1 July 1965	4	179-0085

=== Postal codes ===
In Nerima Ward, the first three digits of the postal code are either 176, 177, 178, or 179, depending on the area.

- 〒176-00XX: Nerima Post Office
- 〒177-00XX: Shakujii Post Office
- 〒178-00XX: Ōizumi Post Office
- 〒179-00XX: Hikarigaoka Post Office

=== Climate ===
During summer months, the Nerima Ward experiences intense heat, with many days exceeding 35°C and peak temperatures sometimes reaching 38°C. During winter months, it recorded a low of -7.0°C in 2018, and between January and March each year, low-pressure systems approaching from the south often bring snowfall, when the costal wards in downtown Tokyo receives only rain or sleet.

These temperature variations, combined with drainage from local rivers and irrigation canals, create ideal conditions for agriculture. Nerima has become renowned for its specialty crops, including Nerima daikon, cabbage, blueberries, and grapes. Annual precipitation typically ranges from 1,000 to 2,000 millimeters, showing no clear long-term trends.

Climate data for Nerima (2013−2020 normals, extremes 2012−present)
Month	Jan	Feb	Mar	Apr	May	Jun	Jul	Aug	Sep	Oct	Nov	Dec	Year
Record high °C (°F)	19.3 (66.7)	24.8 (76.6)	28.8 (83.8)	29.9 (85.8)	34.7 (94.5)	34.8 (94.6)	39.6 (103.3)	39.0 (102.2)	37.0 (98.6)	33.4 (92.1)	25.0 (77.0)	25.0 (77.0)	39.6 (103.3)
Mean daily maximum °C (°F)	9.9 (49.8)	10.8 (51.4)	15.2 (59.4)	20.0 (68.0)	25.5 (77.9)	27.1 (80.8)	30.8 (87.4)	32.5 (90.5)	27.6 (81.7)	22.1 (71.8)	16.8 (62.2)	11.9 (53.4)	20.9 (69.5)
Daily mean °C (°F)	4.8 (40.6)	5.8 (42.4)	10.0 (50.0)	14.4 (57.9)	20.0 (68.0)	22.5 (72.5)	26.3 (79.3)	27.8 (82.0)	23.6 (74.5)	18.1 (64.6)	12.4 (54.3)	7.1 (44.8)	16.1 (60.9)
Mean daily minimum °C (°F)	0.2 (32.4)	1.4 (34.5)	5.2 (41.4)	9.5 (49.1)	15.2 (59.4)	19.0 (66.2)	23.0 (73.4)	24.2 (75.6)	20.2 (68.4)	14.8 (58.6)	8.4 (47.1)	2.7 (36.9)	12.0 (53.6)
Record low °C (°F)	−7.0 (19.4)	−4.1 (24.6)	−2.6 (27.3)	1.2 (34.2)	6.4 (43.5)	12.3 (54.1)	17.4 (63.3)	17.4 (63.3)	12.2 (54.0)	6.6 (43.9)	−1.1 (30.0)	−3.4 (25.9)	−7.0 (19.4)
Average precipitation mm (inches)	47.8 (1.88)	39.6 (1.56)	109.3 (4.30)	130.9 (5.15)	88.3 (3.48)	201.4 (7.93)	165.8 (6.53)	164.4 (6.47)	229.6 (9.04)	263.9 (10.39)	66.2 (2.61)	46.3 (1.82)	1,553.3 (61.15)
Average precipitation days (≥ 1.0 mm)	4.1	3.9	8.1	8.5	7.5	12.3	12.6	10.8	12.5	9.9	7.4	5.0	102.6
Mean monthly sunshine hours	212.9	178.8	189.1	193.4	213.2	135.7	147.6	175.3	120.3	131.3	160.3	182.3	2,040.2
Source: JMA

=== Parks ===
Parks

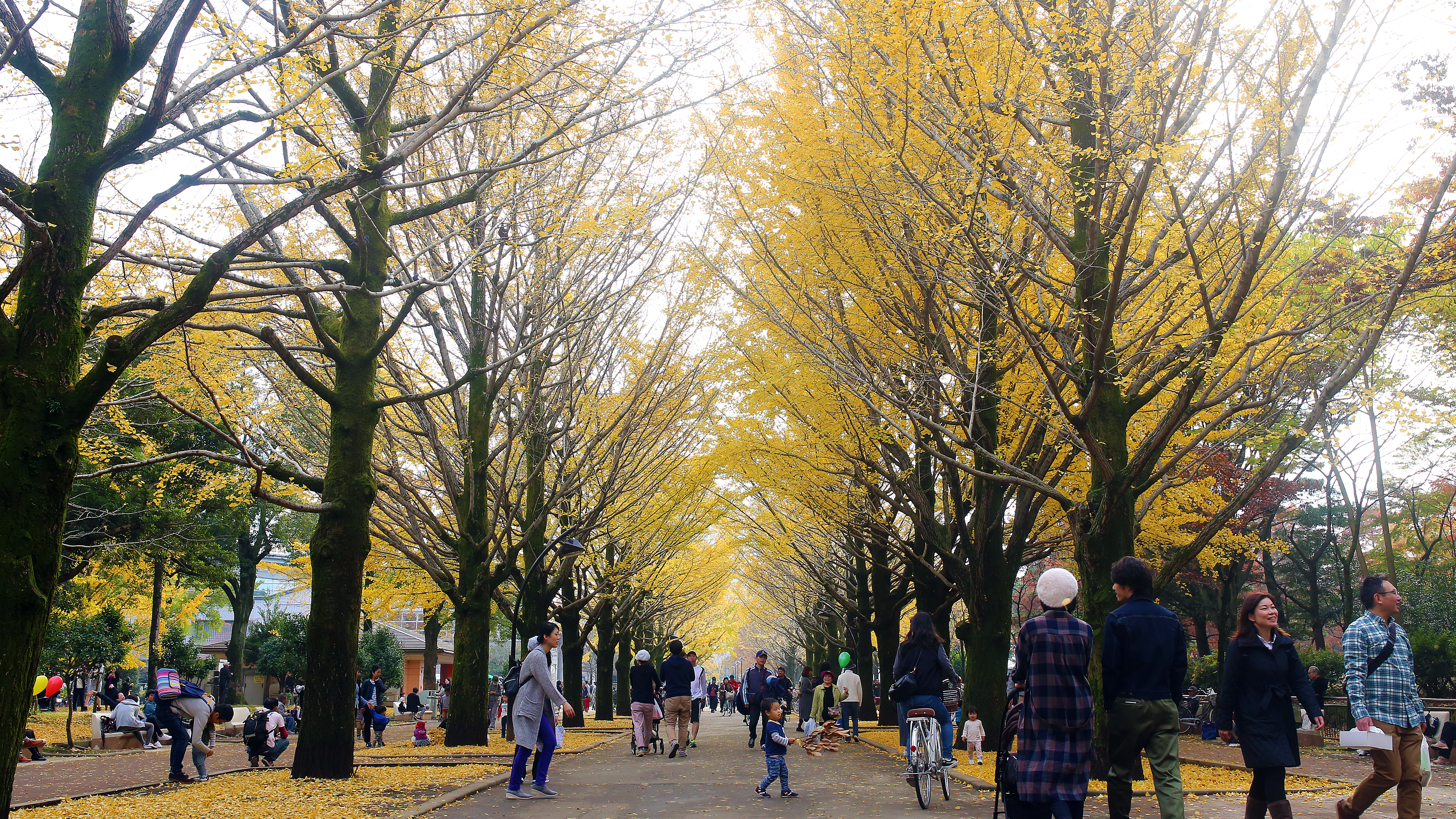
Hikarigaoka Park

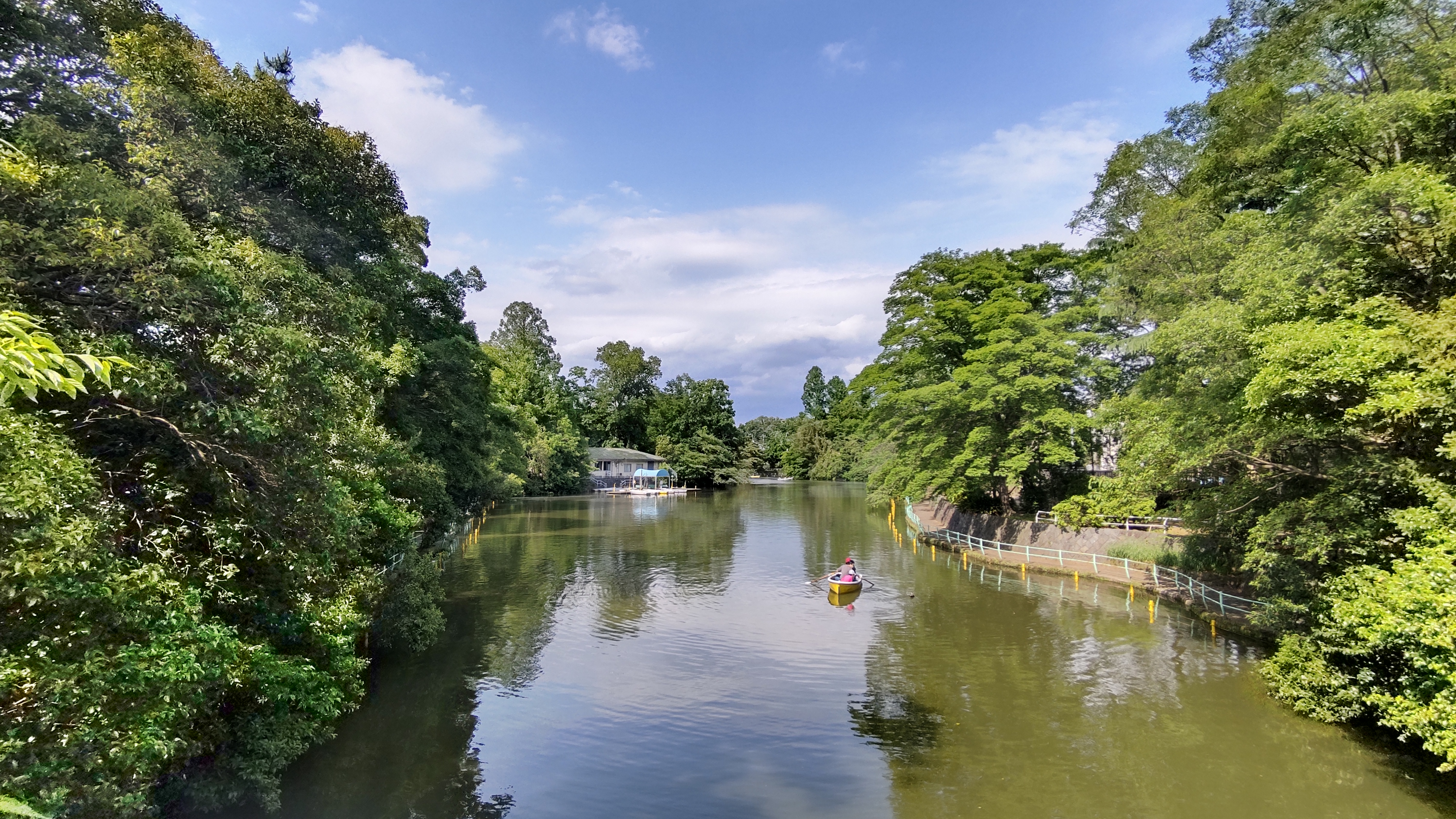
Fujimi Pond in Musashi-Seki Park

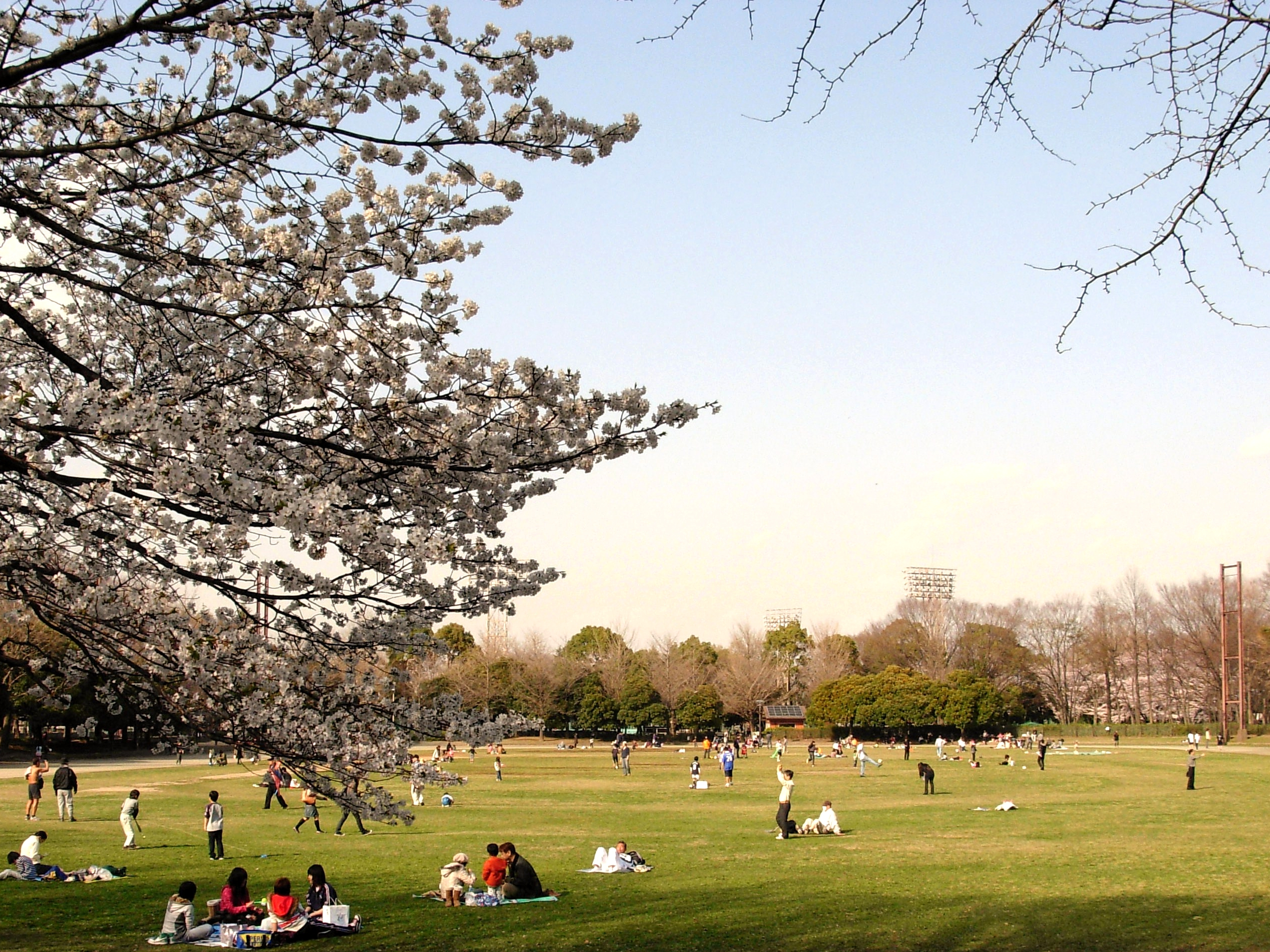
Jōhoku Central Park

- Hikarigaoka Park
- Shakujii Park
- Ōizumi Central Park
- Musashiseki Park
- Jōhoku Central Park (half of it is part of Itabashi Ward)
- Takamatsu Park

=== Facilities ===
==== Museums ====
- Ward art museum
- Iwasaki Chihiro illustrated book museum
- Tōei Animation Museum

==== Amusement parks ====
Amusement Parks

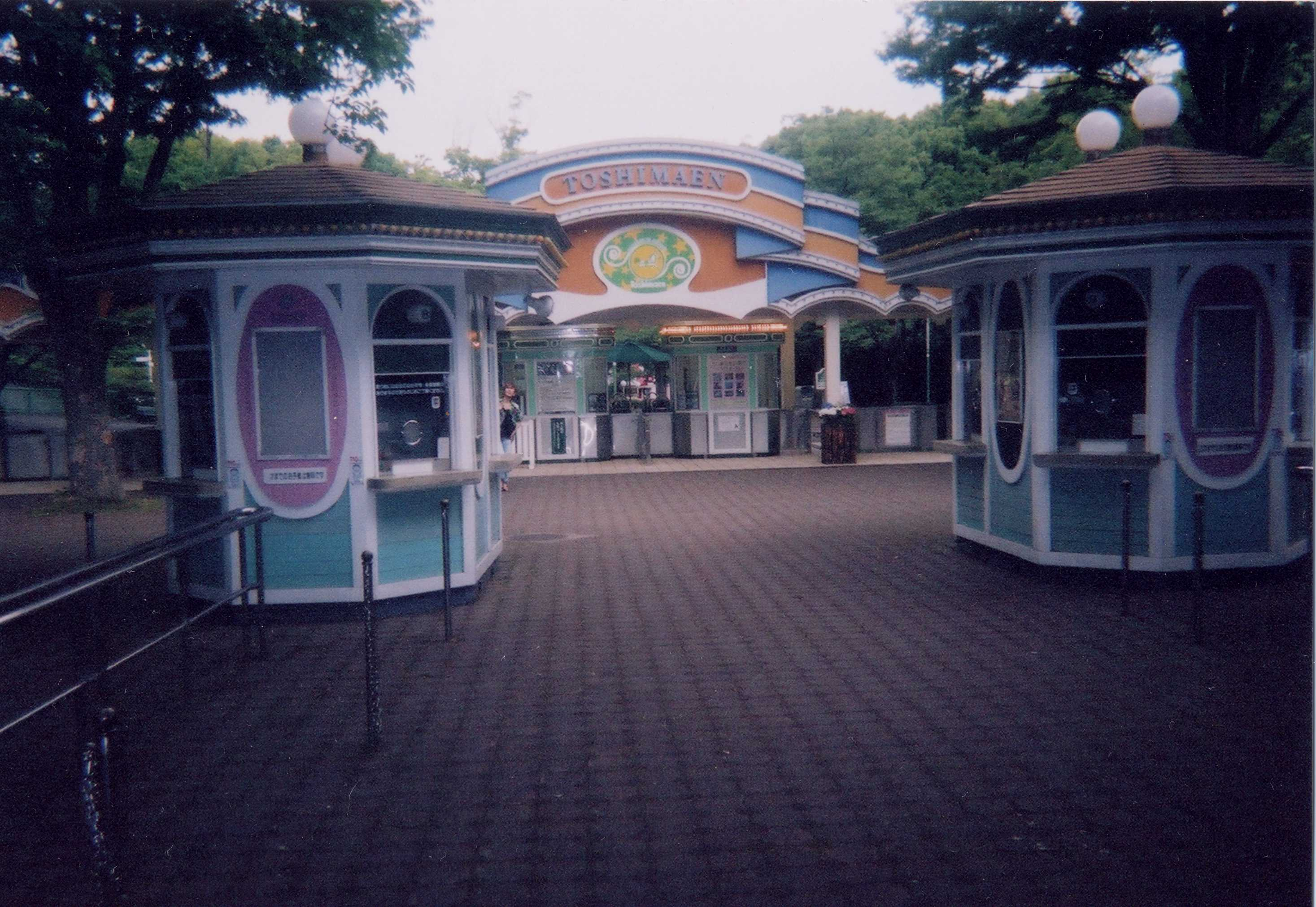
The historic Toshimaen amusement park

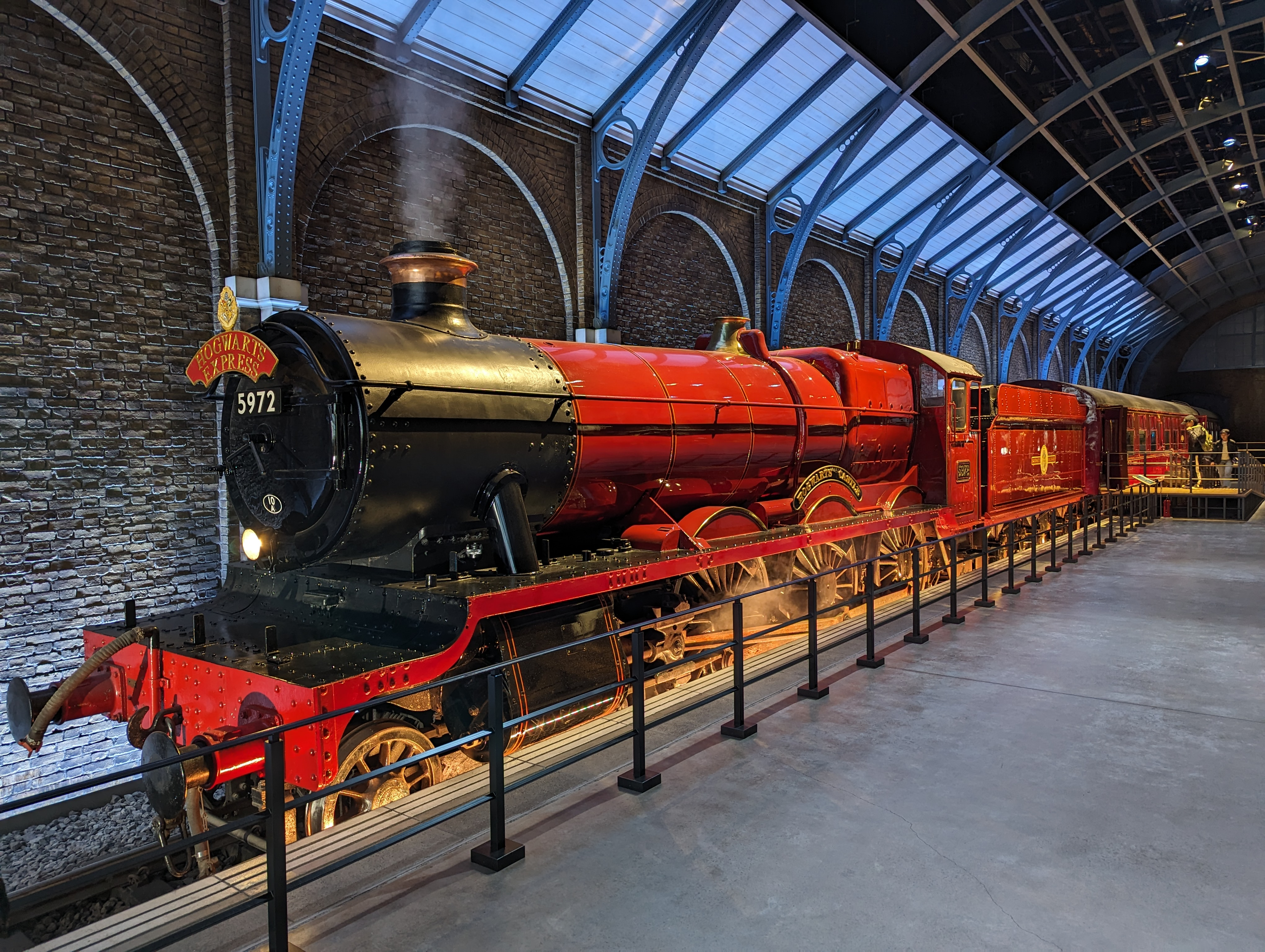
The Making of Harry Potter - Warner Bros. Studio Tour Tokyo

===== Toshimaen =====
Toshimaen (closed permanently on 31 August 2020) was an amusement park in Nerima Ward. The majority of the former Toshimaen site was purchased by the Tokyo Metropolitan Government after its closure, and is planned to be developed as a large park that serves as a base for use in event of a disaster. Another part of it was used to reopen as The Making of Harry Potter - Warner Bros. Studio Tour Tokyo.

===== Warner Bros. Studio Tour Tokyo – The Making of Harry Potter =====
Toshimaen reopened as Warner Bros. Studio Tour Tokyo – The Making of Harry Potter, announced in August 2020 and opened on 16 June 2023, Warner Bros. Studio Tour Tokyo – The Making of Harry Potter is the second such park in the world, after the one in London, which opened in 2012. It is located in Nerima Ward, on part of the now-defunct Toshimaen amusement park site. Similar to its counterpart in London, the 30,000 square-meter attraction in Tokyo offers visitors a walking tour through some of the recreated famous film sets including the Great Hall, the Forbidden Forest, and the Diagon Alley. It also displays film sets, costumes, and props that were used in the Harry Potter films. In addition to Harry Potter, it also covers the Fantastic Beasts spin-offs. Steam locomotive 4920 Dumbleton Hall, which is identical to the locomotive used in the Harry Potter movies, will be an exhibit.

== Toponym ==
The earliest confirmed appearance of the name Nerima dates to a 1362 document titled Musashi-no-kuni Ganmon (武蔵国願文), where it was recorded phonetically as Nerima-gō (ねりま郷). The earliest known record using the kanji characters "練馬" appears over a century later in the 1480 Ōta Dōkan-jō (太田道灌状), a military report referencing Nerima Castle (練馬城).

While the exact etymological origin of the name remains unknown, several theories exist:

- It derives from neriba (ねり場), a place where the red clay of the Kanto loam layer was kneaded (neru).
- It comes from nenuma (根沼), meaning "deep swamps," which were numerous in the secluded lowlands of the Shakujii River basin.
- It is a corruption of Norinuma (のりぬま / 乗沼 or 乗瀦), a post station located in Musashi Province during the Nara period. While some historians estimate this station was situated near the Hakusan Shrine in modern-day Nerima, another prominent theory places it in Amanuma, Suginami Ward.
- During the Middle Ages, a retainer of the ruling Toshima clan was a master of horsemanship, and the practice of training and breaking in horses (馬) was referred to as neru (練る).

In English, the ward sometimes translates ward as city, as do some of the other special wards of Tokyo. In maps and street signs, it also uses the word ward, or simply -ku.

== History ==
=== Prehistory ===
People first began living in Nerima during the Paleolithic period. Archaeological evidence that bears witness to this has been discovered throughout the ward, such as the Paleolithic spear-point stone tools excavated from the Musashi-Seki site, which are registered as cultural property of the ward.

=== Toshima clan rule ===
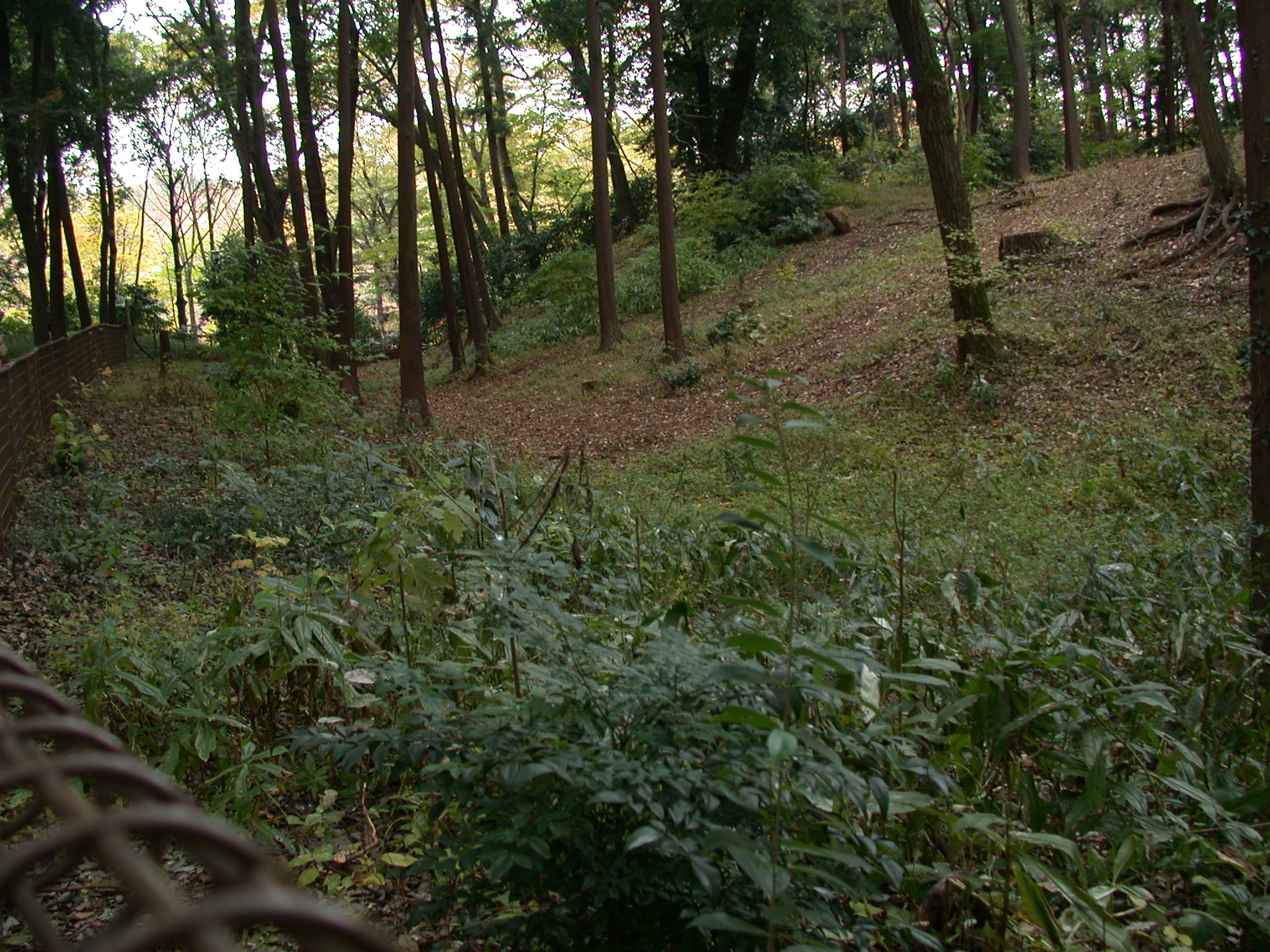
Ruins of Shakujii Castle, Kamakura/Muromachi-era seat of the Toshima clan's territory

During the Heian period, most of Nerima was part of Toshima District (豊嶋郡, Toshima-gun), which included the city of Edo, in Musashi Province. By the end of the Heian period, the Toshima clan had control of the district.

During the beginning of the Muromachi period, the Toshima clan, who had power at the mouth of the Arakawa River, expanded their territory along the Shakujii River, and eventually built Nerima Castle (now Nerima-jōshi Park) and Shakujii Castle (now Shakujii Park). The Toshima clan continued to rule until Toshima Yasutsune, the lord of Shakujii Castle, was defeated on 28 April 1477, by Ōta Dōkan, a vassal of the Uesugi clan who built Edo Castle.

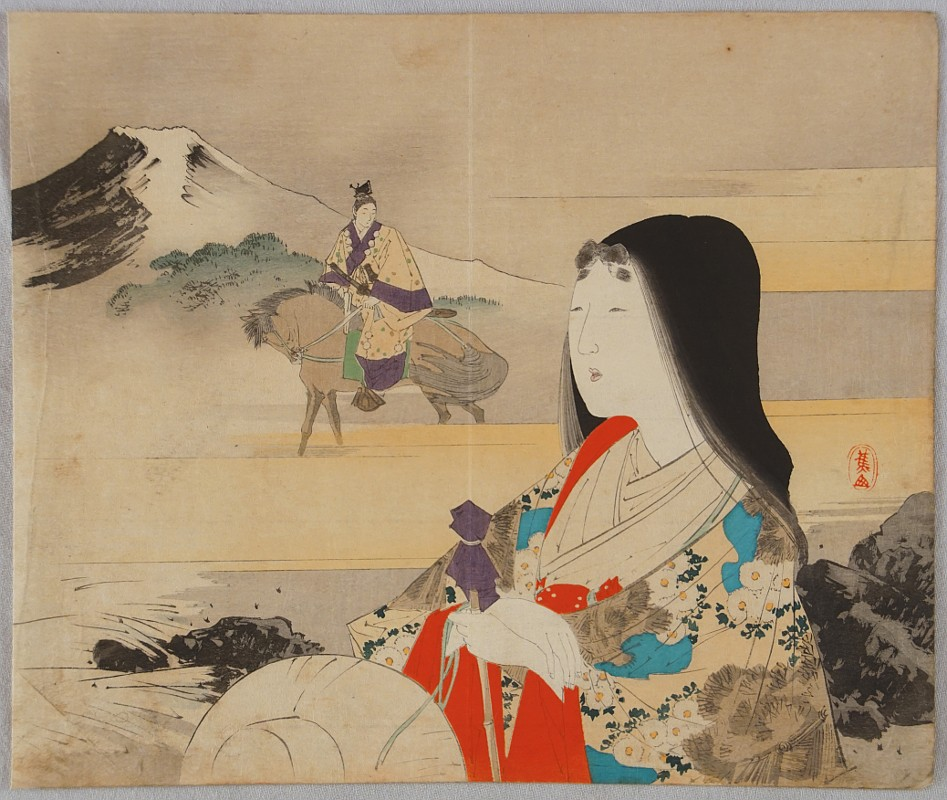
Woodblock print depicting Princess Teruhime

The leyend has it that when Dōkan launched his final assault on Shakujii Castle, the castle's lord Toshima Yasutsune faced inevitable defeat. Yasutsune placed a golden saddle, a treasured heirloom of the Toshima clan, on his snow-white horse and rode to the cliff behind the castle. With Dōkan's soldiers watching from below, he spurred his horse over the edge, plunging into the waters of Sanbōji Pond (located in present-day Shakujii Park), where both horse and rider drowned. Yasutsune had a beautiful second daughter called Princess Teruhime, who was so saddened by her father's death that she threw herself into the same pond and drowned with him. Moved by compassion for the princess, Dōkan ordered a memorial mound built in her honor. Local folklore says that those who climb the old pine tree near Teruhime's mound can glimpse the golden saddle still gleaming at the bottom of the pond. This tree is called Teruhi-no-Matsu. Today, Nerima Ward commemorates the princess with an annual festival called the Teruhime Matsuri.

After the defeat of the Toshima clan, the area came under the influence of the Ōta clan, and then the Hōjō clan, before transitioning into the Tokugawa era.

=== Edo period ===
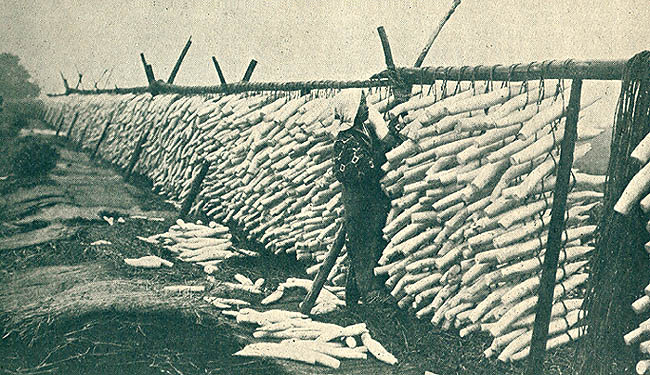
Farmer cultivating Nerima daikon in Tokyo City (Winter, c. 1935)

During the Edo period, Nerima developed as a major suburban farming village in Toshima District, that supplied the city of Edo with daikon, burdock, and potatoes, among other products. During this period, the area's specialty, Nerima daikon developed. The earliest reference of Nerima daikon is from the 1683 geography book Murasaki-no-Hitomoto (『紫の一本』) edited by Toda Mosui. One of the legends about its origin is related to Tokugawa Tsunayoshi, the 5th shogun of the Edo shogunate, who built a villa in the village of Shimo-Nerima before becoming shogun, and brought seeds of Miyashige daikon from Owari to a vacant lot within the villa and cultivated them. The Senkawa Aqueduct, which is now almost a culvert, was developed by the Tokugawa Shogunate in 1696 and became a valuable water resource for agriculture in Nerima at the time.

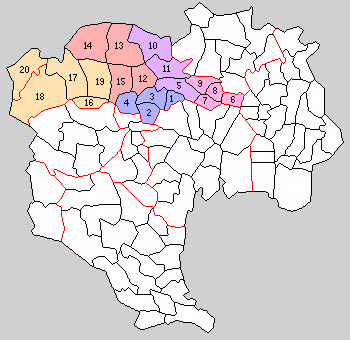
Map of Kita-Toshima District in 1889. The yellow area is today's Nerima Ward, and the orange area is today's Itabashi Ward.

After the Boshin War, the city of Edo was removed from Toshima District, and was renamed Tokyo City. In 1878, during the abolition of the han system in the Meiji era, the rest of Toshima District was divided into Kita-Toshima District (北豊島郡, Kita-Toshima-gun) and Minami-Toshima District (南豊島郡, Minami-Toshima-gun). Nerima was incorporated into Kita-Toshima District under the District, Town and Village Organization Act of 1878 (郡区町村編成法).

After the Great Kanto Earthquake in 1923, population began to flow from the city center into the Nerima area.

On 1 October 1932, Kita-Toshima District merged into Tokyo City as part of Itabashi Ward, including the town of Nerima and the villages of Kami-Nerima, Naka-Arai, Shakujii, and Ōizumi.

=== Second World War ===
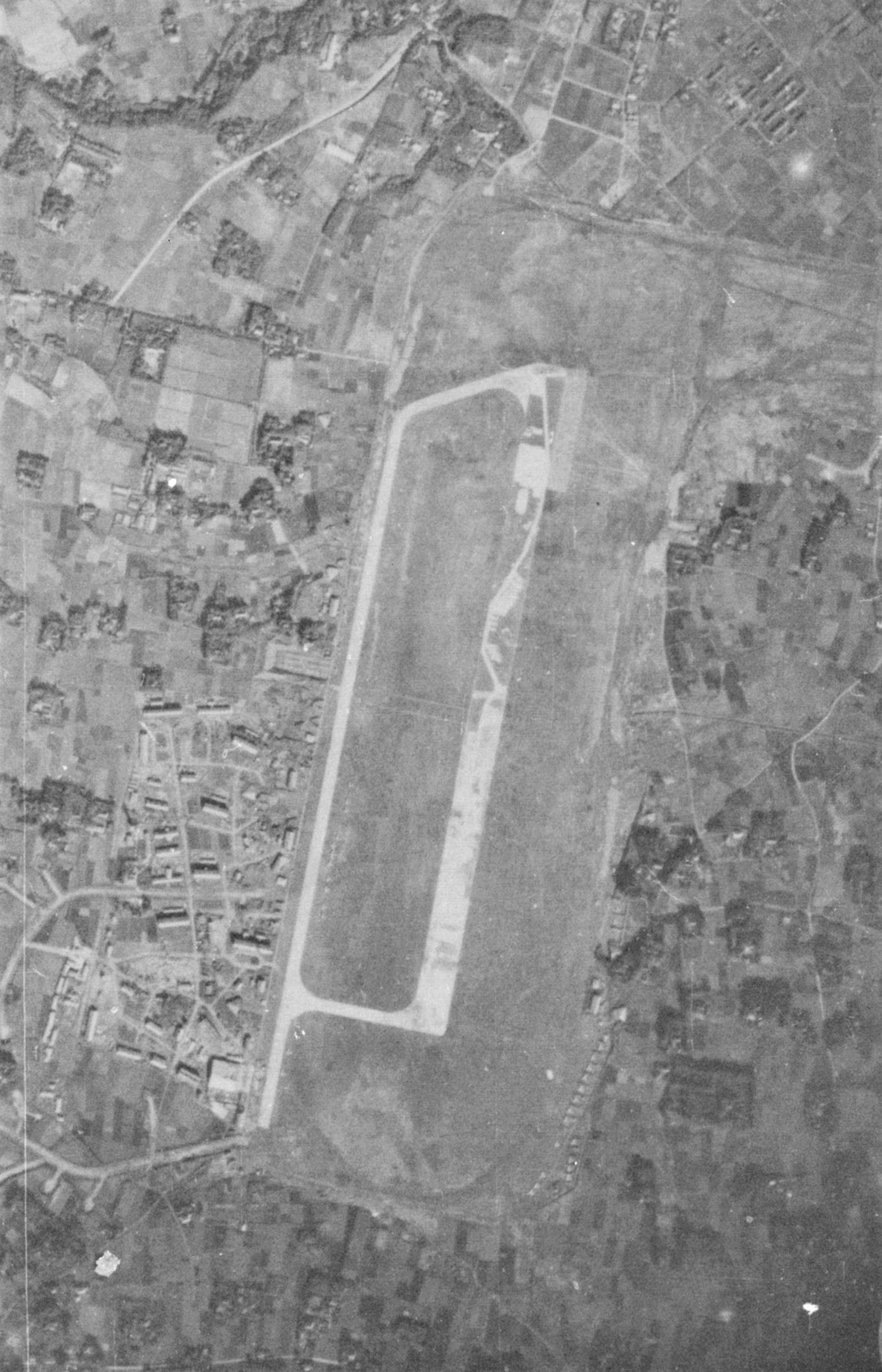
The Imperial Japanese Army's Narimasu Airfield in October 1944

During the Second World War, the Imperial Japanese Army operated Narimasu Airfield in the Nerima area in Itabashi Ward. At its peak, the earthworks were rushed, with 3,000 people working in day and night shifts each day. The Imperial Japanese Army's 47th Air Squadron, 43rd Airfield Battalion, and the Narimasu Detachment Maintenance Unit of the Tachikawa Branch of the Air Arsenal were based there. Towards the end of the war, it became a place for the Southern Operation Squadron to regain its fighting strength, and the 48th and 231st Shinbu Special Attack Units were stationed here and used it as a training ground. In addition, the 101st, 102nd, and 103rd Air Squadrons were also relocated there. Remnants of its wartime infrastructure can still be seen today. Concrete bunkers that once housed aircraft remain visible in Hikarigaoka Park, and the runway is now the main street in front of the IMA department store in Hikarigaoka.

During the occupation of Japan, the occupying Allied forces renamed the former Narimasu Airfield to Grant Heights on 3 March 1947. On 5 April, the construction of family quarters for the United States Army Air Forces began, and was finished in June 1948.

=== Independence ===
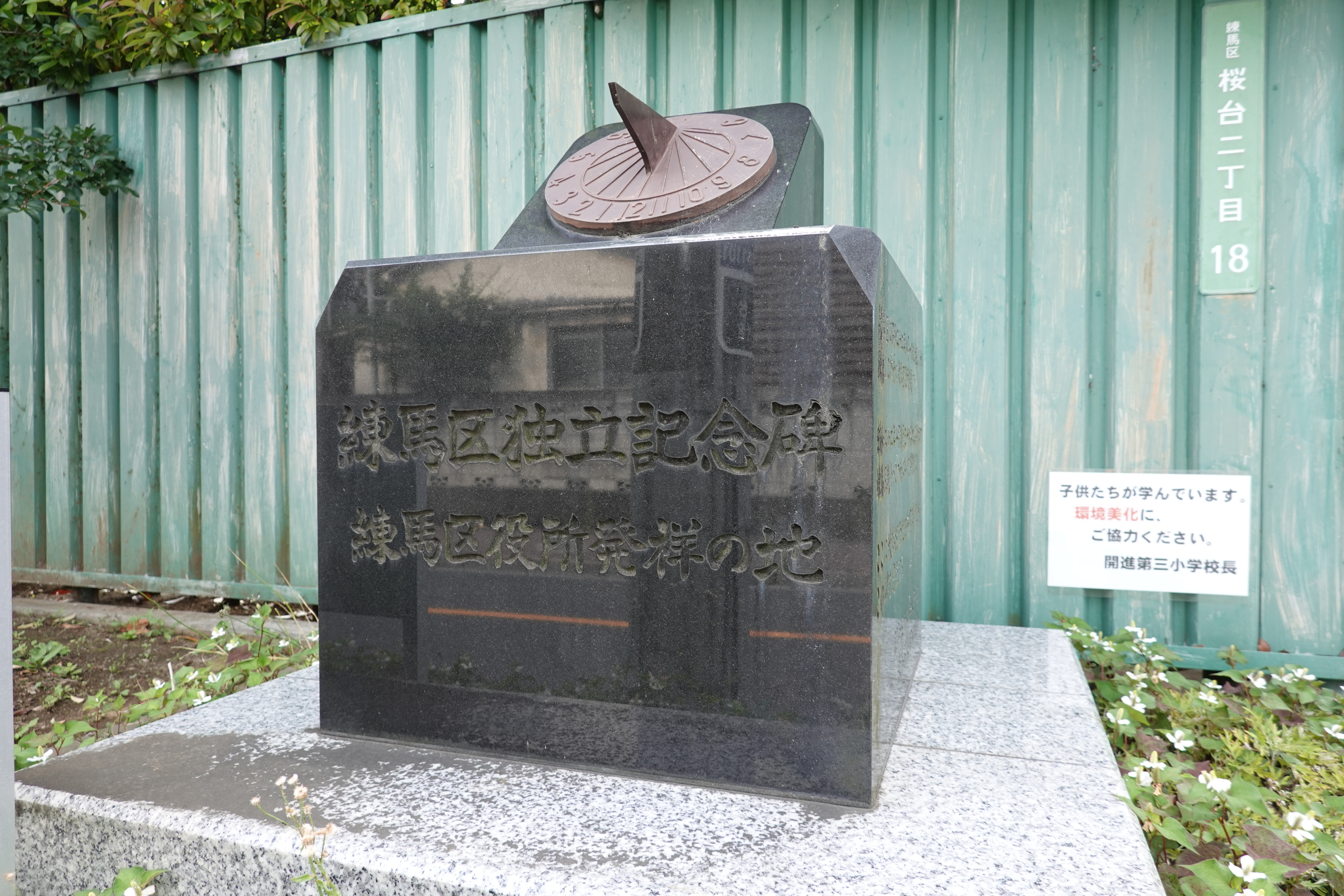
Monument to commemorate the ward's independence from Itabashi Ward

In 1946, shortly after the end of the war, the local government system was reviewed by a memorandum of the Allied Forces. One of the measures was to merge the then 35 wards of Tokyo into 22 wards. The people of the Nerima area in Itabashi Ward had long been troubled by the distance of the Itabashi Ward Office. Since the establishment of Itabashi Ward in 1932, there have been several talks about separating the Nerima region, but they had not been successful. During the review of the ward system, the town council presidents, ward assembly members, and various organization leaders of Nerima, Shakujii, and Ōizumi got together to try to make Nerima independent from Itabashi Ward, but the purpose of the occupying forces was to merge wards, not create new ones. In March 1947, the wards of Tokyo were merged into 22 wards, with Nerima still being part of Itabashi Ward. After much campaigning, five months after the establishment of the 22 special wards, on 1 August, Nerima Ward was established and declared independent from Itabashi Ward, becoming the 23rd special ward of Tokyo. Nerima Ward's independence day is commemorated annually.

When the Allied occupation of Japan ended in 1952, the Japan Self-Defense Forces established a base in Nerima Ward. The first division of the eastern group of the Ground Self-Defense Force has its headquarters there.

In 1973, the United States Forces Japan returned Grant Heights to Japanese control.

== Demographics ==
Historical population
Year	Pop.	±%
1947	111,792	—
1950	125,197	+12.0%
1960	305,628	+144.1%
1970	527,931	+72.7%
1980	564,156	+6.9%
1990	618,663	+9.7%
2000	658,132	+6.4%
2010	716,124	+8.8%
2020	752,608	+5.1%
Source: Censuses

== Culture ==
=== Festivals ===
Festivals

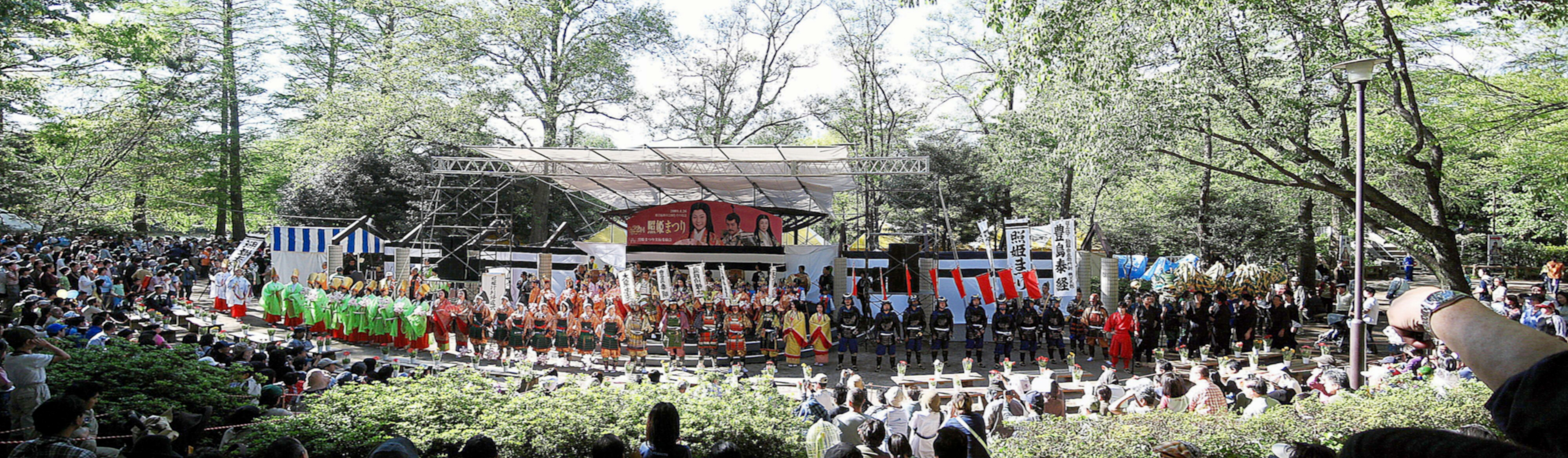
Teruhime Festival

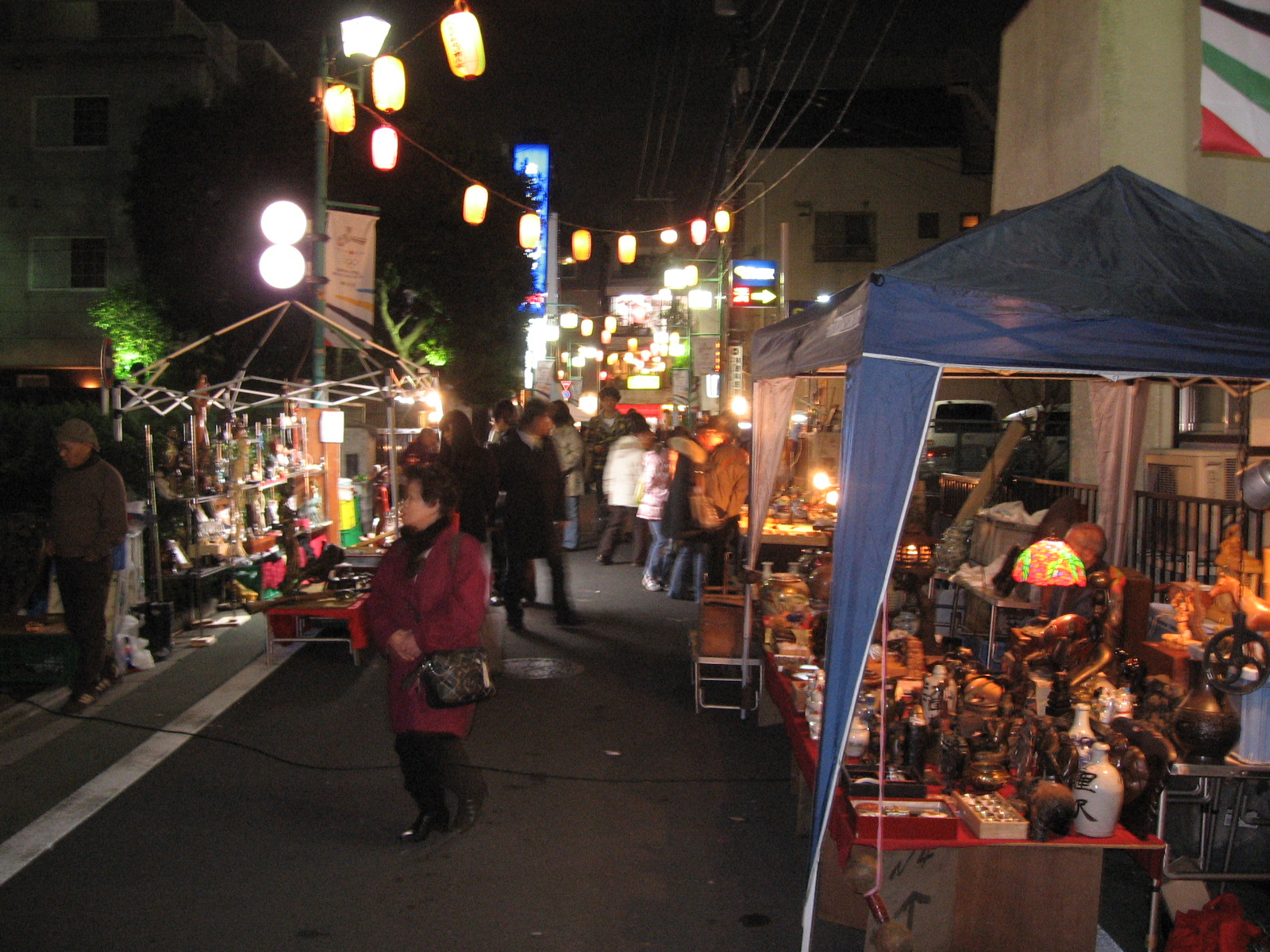
Seki-no-Boroichi Market

- Teruhime Matsuri (April or May): A festival held annually in Shakujii Park in honor of Teruhime, daughter of Toshima Yasutsune, lord of Shakujii Castle during the Muromachi period. People dressed in period costumes as Princess Teruhime, Lord Yasutsune, the wife, members of the Toshima clan, and retainers perform the stage play The Legend of Teruhime and parade around the park. The roles of the princes, the mother, and the lord are open to the public, and can be played by people living in Nerima Ward.
- Yosakoi Matsuri in Hikarigaoka Park (July)
- Nerima Festival (October)
- Tori-no-Ichi (November): A festival held at Nerima Ōtori Shrine in the Toyotama-Kita neighborhood every November on the day of the rooster, attracting tens of thousands of people.
- Seki-no-Boroichi Market (December): A traditional flea market which has been held every December since 1751 during the Edo period in Honryūji Temple, in the Sekimachi-Kita neighborhood, next to Musashi-Seki Station.

=== Traditional Products ===
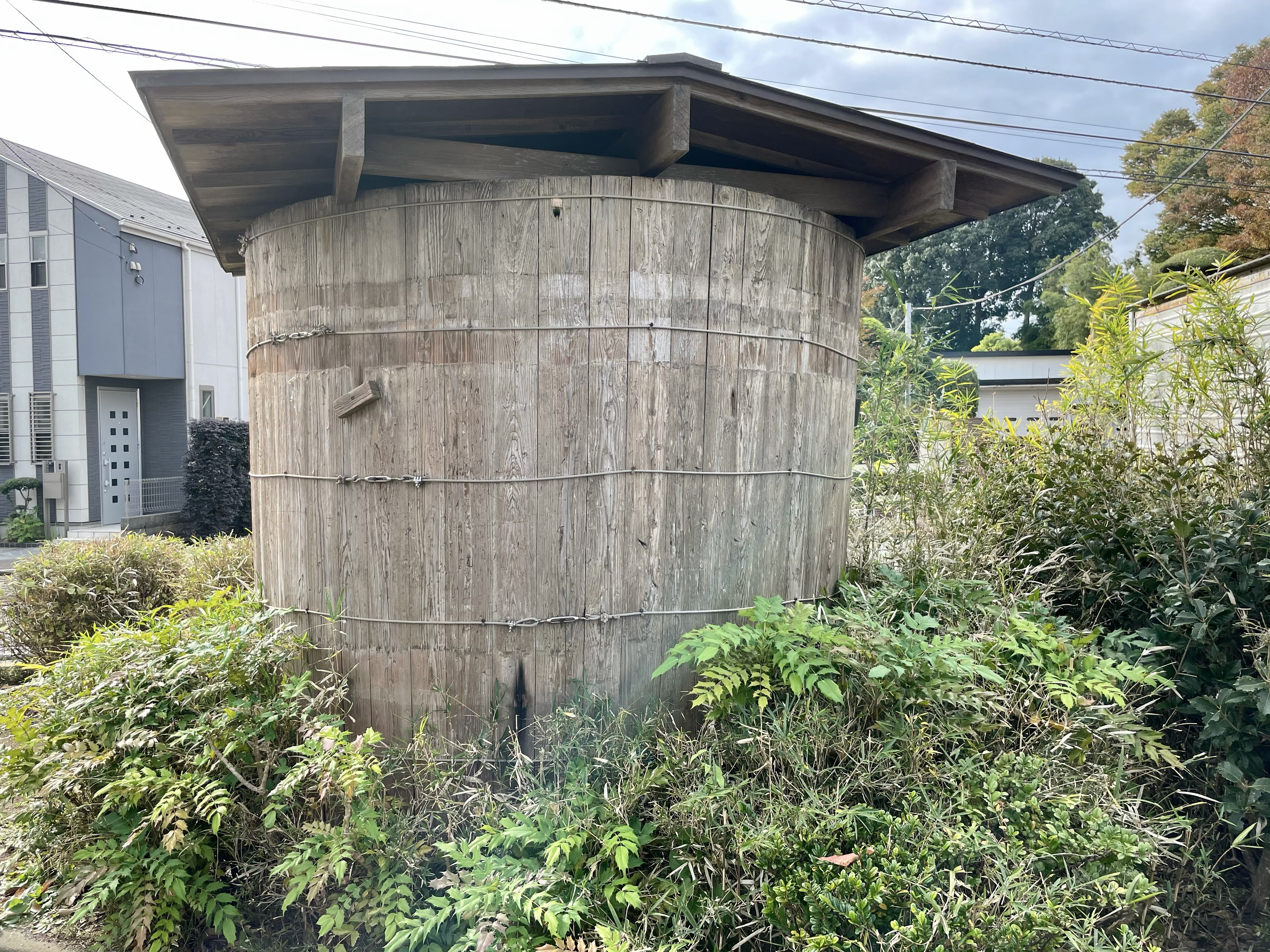
Pickled daikon being produced in Wakamiya Park, in the Takamatsu neighborhood of Nerima Ward

- Cabbage
- Nerima daikon
- Pickled vegetables, centered around pickled daikon (takuan)
- Sweets such as monaka and manjū featuring Nerima daikon motifs
- Tokyo hand-painted yuzen (textile dyeing)

=== Food ===
- Nerima Spaghetti (pasta dish that uses grated Nerima daikon and canned tuna for the sauce, which is then topped with seaweed flakes). This dish is usually served in elementary schools and is a staple in many Nerima citizens' childhood.

=== Animation ===
Nerima Ward is the birthplace of Japanese anime, where Japan's first full-length color theatrical anime film The Tale of the White Serpent (1958) was produced. It is also the birthplace of television anime, where the world's first weekly broadcast full-scale TV anime series Astro Boy (black and white) was created in 1963, and Japan's first full-color TV anime series Jungle Emperor Leo began in 1965.

From Toei Animation's Ōizumi Studio, many anime industry figures including Hayao Miyazaki, Isao Takahata, Rintaro, Yasuo Otsuka, and Mamoru Hosoda have emerged.

Nerima Ward, home to Toei Animation (formerly Toei Films) and Osamu Tezuka's Mushi Production (currently unrelated to Tezuka Productions), has 94 anime-related companies (as of 2007), making it Japan's largest concentration of anime-related businesses. Numerous works have been produced here and set in this location. Beyond anime, this area has also been frequently used for filming tokusatsu (special effects) productions, particularly the long-running Super Sentai series that has continued for 30 years, and Kamen Rider. Since 2002, the annual Nerima Anime Festival has been held in Ōizumi-Gakuen, working with shopping districts and NPOs to promote anime.

In 2004, the Nerima Animation Council was established by about 50 businesses including Mushi Production and Toei Animation to promote anime in Nerima Ward. The council has been aiming to build an anime museum in the ward since its predecessor NPO Anime Museum Association was established in 1994. However, progress has stalled due to concerns about duplication after Toei Animation independently created the Toei Animation Gallery (now Toei Animation Museum) in 2003.

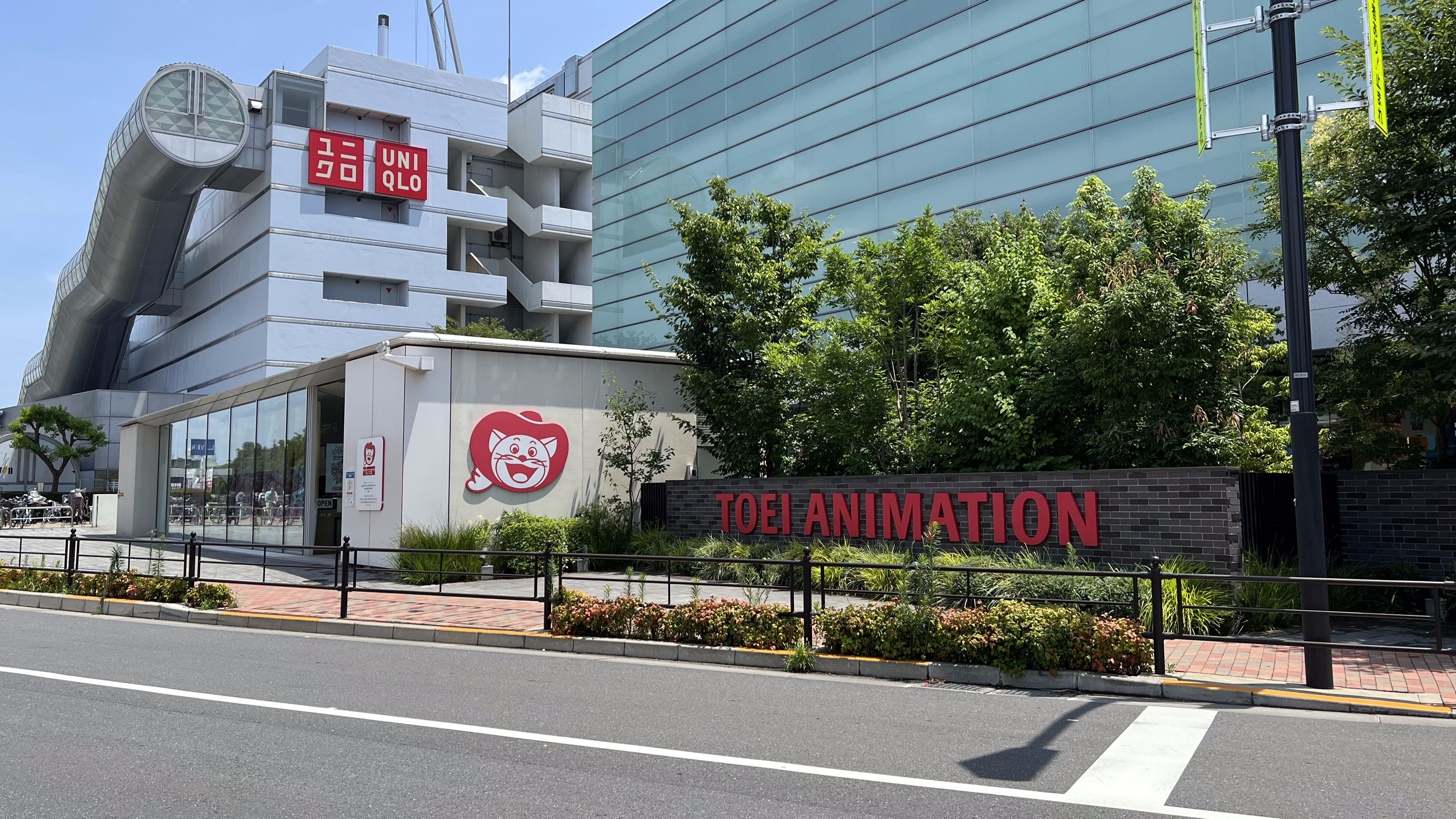
Toei Animation Museum

=== Manga ===
Nerima Ward attracted many manga artists including Osamu Tezuka and Shotaro Ishinomori to establish their residences and workplaces due to its convenient transportation access to publishing companies in Chiyoda Ward's Hitotsubashi and Kanda-Jinbōchō areas, and Bunkyō Ward's Otowa area. Other advantages included proximity to art supply stores and being somewhat removed from distracting entertainment districts, allowing for concentrated work. Many manga artists, both famous and unknown, have permanently resided or temporarily lived here, including Reiji Matsumoto, Keizo Shimada, Noboru Baba, Jiro Ota, Fujio Akatsuka, Sanpei Furuya, Tetsuya Chiba, Akio Chiba, Asao Takamori (Ikki Kajiwara), Fujiko Fujio, Moto Hagio, Keiko Takemiya, Yasumi Yoshizawa, Kenshi Hirokane, Fumi Saimon, Hideo Azuma, Rumiko Takahashi, and Yoshinori Kobayashi. Many manga works feature settings and backgrounds based on Nerima Ward.

In Nerima Ward's Ōizumi area, there existed the Ōizumi Salon, the female manga artist version of Tokiwa-so, where many renowned female manga artists including Moto Hagio and Keiko Takemiya developed their careers.

== References in popular culture ==
Nerima Ward is the setting for many manga and anime.

=== In manga and anime ===
Work	Creator	Description
Birdy the Mighty	Masami Yuki	The series is set in Nerima Ward, and many characters are named after places around Ekoda Station.
Cross Game / H2 / Miyuki	Mitsuru Adachi	Many of Adachi's works are set in Nerima Ward.
Digimon Adventure (film); Digimon Adventure	Akiyoshi Hongo	In the 1999 animated short film, Tai and the rest of the DigiDestined were residents of Hikarigaoka (often renamed Highton View Terrace in the English dub). Following the Parrotmon incident, many of the DigiDestined parents moved to Odaiba. In episode 29 of the TV series, the location served to give a recollection of the incident to the DigiDestined, who had arrived in search of the eighth child. They later go to Hikarigaoka Park and Nerima Station.
Doraemon	Fujiko Fujio	Nobita Nobi and his friends live in Nerima Ward, close to the Seibu Line, in a fictional neighborhood called Tsukimidai-Susukigahara. Suneo Honekawa's address is Tokyo, Nerima Ward, Tsukimidai-Susukigahara 3-10-5 (東京都練馬区月見台すすきヶ原3-10-5).
Haikyu!!	Haruichi Furudate	Nekoma High School, one of the main teams of the popular manga and anime series, is in Nerima Ward.
Hayate the Combat Butler	Kenjiro Hata	The villa where the heroine, Nagi Sanzenin, lives and the story takes place is set to take up 65% of Nerima Ward.
I Am a Hero	Kengo Hanazawa	The zombie-manga is set in Miharadai in Nerima Ward.
Kyūkyoku Chōjin R	Masami Yuki	A school comedy manga set in the fictional neighborhood of Isasaka-chō in Nerima Ward, Tokyo.
Maison Ikkoku	Rumiko Takahashi	In the anime version, the address of the house is 〒177 Tokyo, Nerima Ward, Tokeizaka 3-3-9 (〒177 東京都練馬区時計坂三-三-九).
Nerima Daikon Brothers	Takamitsu Kondō	The trio lives on a stage constructed in Hideki's Nerima daikon patch in Nerima Ward.
Nodame Cantabile	Tomoko Ninomiya	A popular manga based on classical music that has been made into an anime and a live-action film. The Momogaoka College of Music that appears in the work is modeled after the Ekoda campus of Musashino Academia Musicae in Nerima Ward. The nearest station, Ekoda Station, was once decorated with an illustration of the main character.
Prison School	Akira Hiramoto	Hachimitsu Academy, the main setting of the anime and manga series, is a fictional high school located in Nerima Ward.
Ranma ½	Rumiko Takahashi	Nerima is the setting of Takahashi's long-running and popular manga and anime series. Soun Tendo's dojo, where the main story takes place, is in Nerima Ward. As one of the first series in either media to achieve widespread popularity in the English-speaking world, Ranma introduced Nerima to Western audiences, with several locations recognizable as backgrounds, such as Shakujii River and Shakujii Park.
Rinshi!! Ekoda-chan	Yukari Takinami	The yonkoma manga serialized in Kodansha's Monthly Afternoon is set in Ekoda, Nerima Ward.
Shōjo Fight	Yoko Nihonbashi	The sports manga about volleyball depicts the scenery around Ekoda Station in Nerima Ward and around Toshimaen Station. In particular, the area around Ekoda Station is depicted a lot, and the ramen shop that the main characters go to in the manga is actually a real shop. In the story, a station called Isasaka is created between the real stations of Ekoda and Sakuradai.
Sket Dance	Kenta Shinohara	The school comedy manga features station names that parody the Fujimidai and Nakamurabashi stations on the Seibu Ikebukuro Line, and is set in Nerima Ward.
Tokyo Ghoul	Sui Ishida	The coffee shop Anteiku where the main character Ken Kaneki works is in the 20th ward (20区), which is Nerima Ward.
Touch	Mitsuru Adachi	The high school baseball manga and anime series is set in Nerima Ward, and the scenery of the ward frequently appears in the work. Also, the Neapolitan served at the coffee shop Minamikaze that appears in the work is modeled after the Neapolitan served at the coffee shop Andes near Nerima Station.
Train to the End of the World	Tsutomu Mizushima	The main characters travel through Nerima Ward aboard a Seibu 2000 series commuter train on the Seibu Ikebukuro Line. Their journey takes them past numerous stations throughout Nerima Ward, all of which have been altered by the catastrophic 7G Incident. The series features a mise en abyme element through Alice in Nerima, a popular fictional anime and manga that exists within the show's universe, whose characters are manifested in reality as a consequence of the same incident.
Urusei Yatsura	Rumiko Takahashi	The series is set in Nerima Ward. The address of the main character, Ataru Moroboshi, is in a fictional neighborhood in Nerima Ward called Tomobiki-chō (友引町), translated as Tomobiki Town.
Your Lie in April	Naoshi Arakawa	The manga and anime is set in Nerima Ward, and the scenery of the ward and the Seibu Ikebukuro Line that runs through Nerima are often depicted in the work.

=== In films ===
==== Ju On (The Grudge) ====
The popular Japanese horror franchise, Ju On, also known as The Grudge, takes place predominantly in a house in Nerima Ward.

== Economy ==
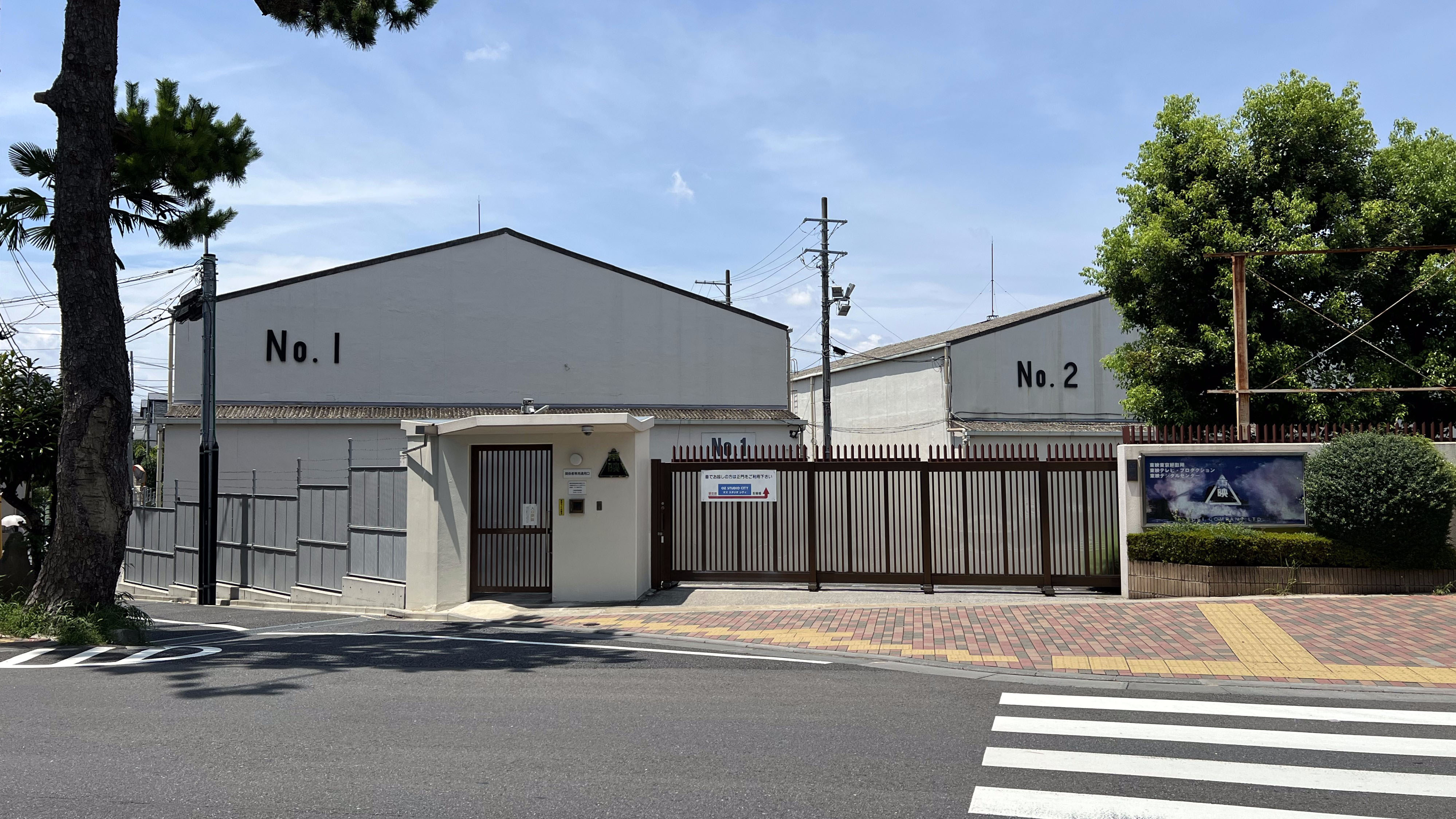
Toei Animation's Studio in Ōizumi

Toei Animation has its headquarters in the Ōizumi Studio in Nerima. Anime International Company has its headquarters in the AIC Digital Building. In addition, Studio Comet, and Mushi Production have their headquarters in Nerima.

=== Anime Studios ===
- Toei Animation
- Anime International Company
- Studio Comet
- Mushi Production
- Asahi Production
- ascension Inc.
- Diomedéa
- Kachigarasu (Encourage Films)
- Imagin (studio)
- Studio Blanc
- Studio Gallop
- Studio Tulip

== Government ==
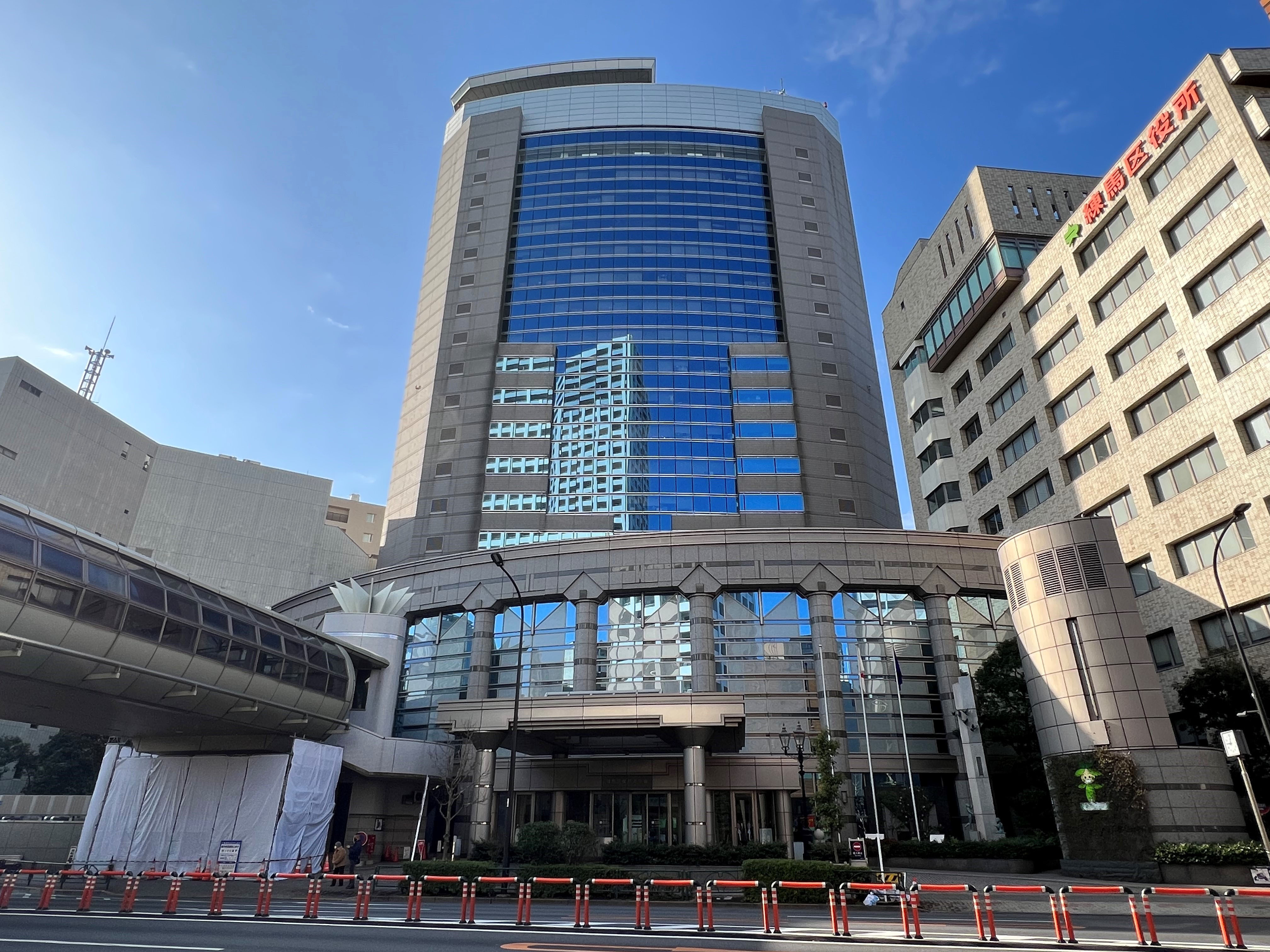
Nerima Ward Office

Nerima Ward is governed by a directly elected ward mayor and a ward assembly, with the current ward mayor serving four-year terms. Like other Tokyo wards, Nerima has significant autonomy in local affairs such as education, welfare services, and urban planning, while the Tokyo Metropolitan Government handles broader regional issues like water supply and major infrastructure. The ward assembly, composed of members elected from local districts, deliberates on budgets, ordinances, and policies. The ward government operates various public services including libraries, community centers, and local administrative offices. The ward office and city hall is in Toyotama-Kita, close to Nerima Station.

=== Designation ===
Nerima is designated as a special ward of Tokyo. Even though it is not designated as a "city" (市, shi), in English, Nerima translates its designation as a "ward" (区, ku) to "city" and refers to itself as Nerima City, following the practice of several other Tokyo special wards. However, in Japanese, it maintains its official designation as Nerima Ward (練馬区, Nerima-ku), with its government office referred to as the Ward Office (区役所, kuyakusho) and its leader as the Ward Mayor (区長, kuchō).

=== Ward Mayor ===
- Ward Mayor (区長, kuchō)：Ken'ichi Yoshida (吉田健一, 1st term）
- Term: 20 April 2026 - 19 April 2030 (expected)

=== Ward Residents' Offices ===
Administrative services are provided through a network of six local ward residents' offices (区民事務所, kumin jimusho) strategically positioned throughout the ward.

- Nerima Ward Residents' Office (6-12-1 Toyotama-Kita, Nerima Ward Office)
- Nerima Ward Hayamiya Residents' Office (1-44-19 Hayamiya)
- Nerima Ward Hikarigaoka Resident's Office (Hikarigaoka Community Center, 2-9-6 Hikarigaoka)
- Nerima Ward Shakujii Residents' Office (Shakujii's Ward Office Building, 3-30-26 Shakujiimachi)
- Nerima Ward Ōizumi Residents' Office (4th floor, Rhythmo Ōizumi-Gakuen, 1-28-1 Higashi-Ōizumi)
- Nerima Ward Seki Resindent's Office (Seki Community Center, 1-7-2 Sekimachi-Kita)

== Transportation ==
=== Rail ===
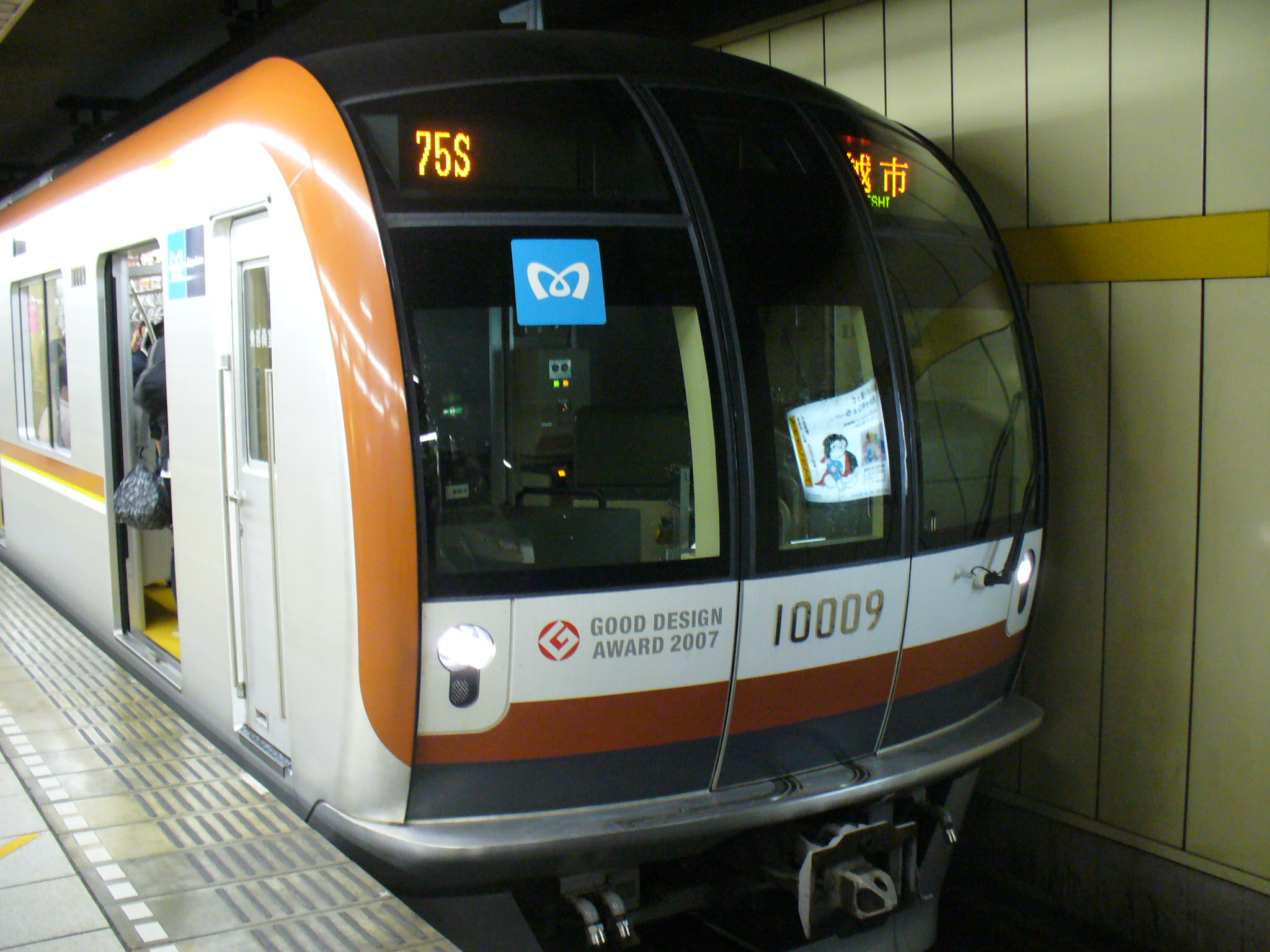
Tokyo Metro Fukutoshin Line

==== Tokyo Metro ====
Yūrakuchō Line

* Kotake Mukaihara, Hikawadai, Heiwadai, Chikatetsu Akatsuka Stations

Fukutoshin Line

* Kotake Mukaihara, Hikawadai, Heiwadai, Chikatetsu Akatsuka Stations

==== Tokyo Metropolitan Bureau of Transportation ====
Ōedo Line

* Shin-egota (on the boundary with Nakano), Nerima, Toshimaen, Nerima-kasugachō, Hikarigaoka Stations

==== Seibu Railway ====
Seibu Railway

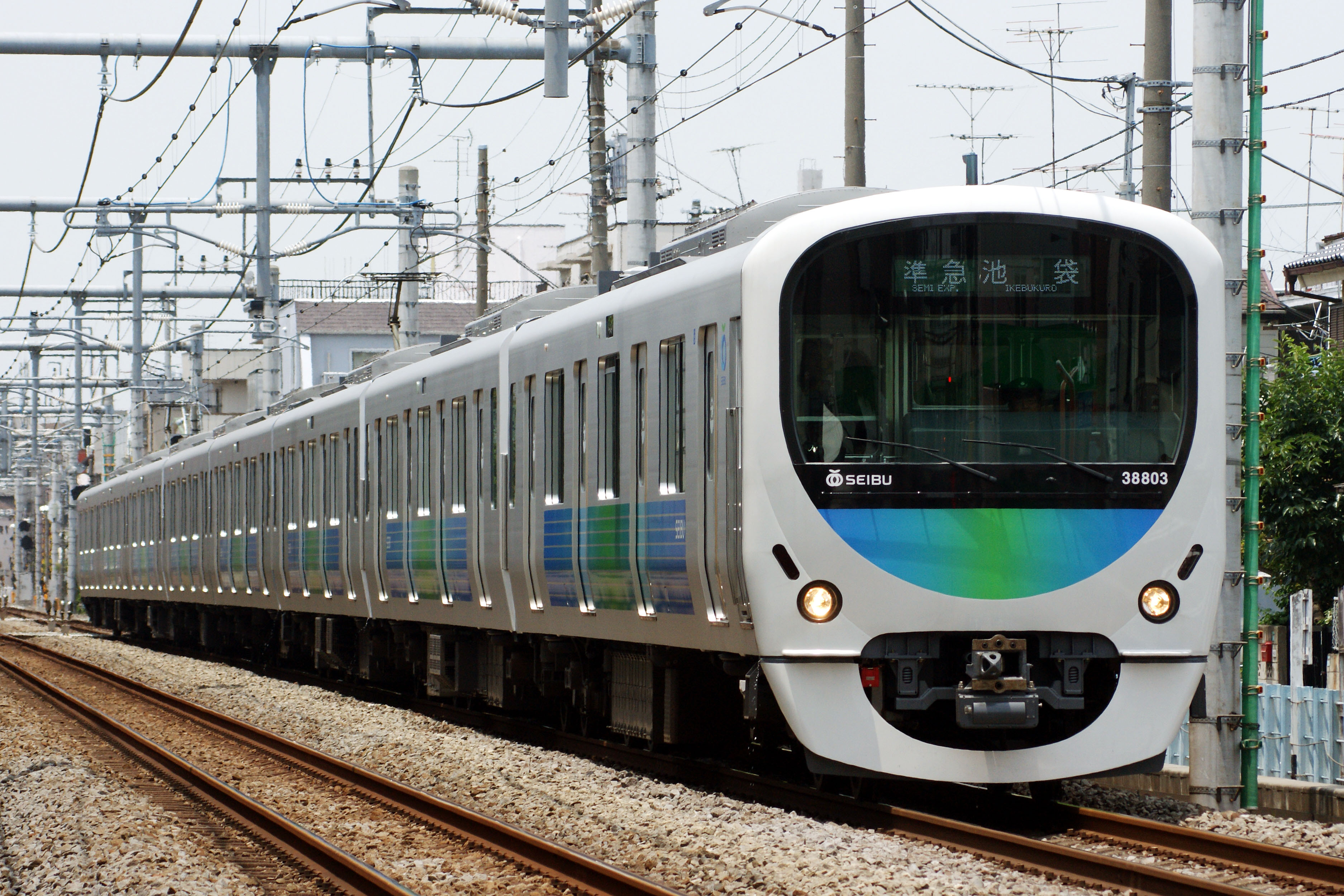
Seibu Ikebukuro Line

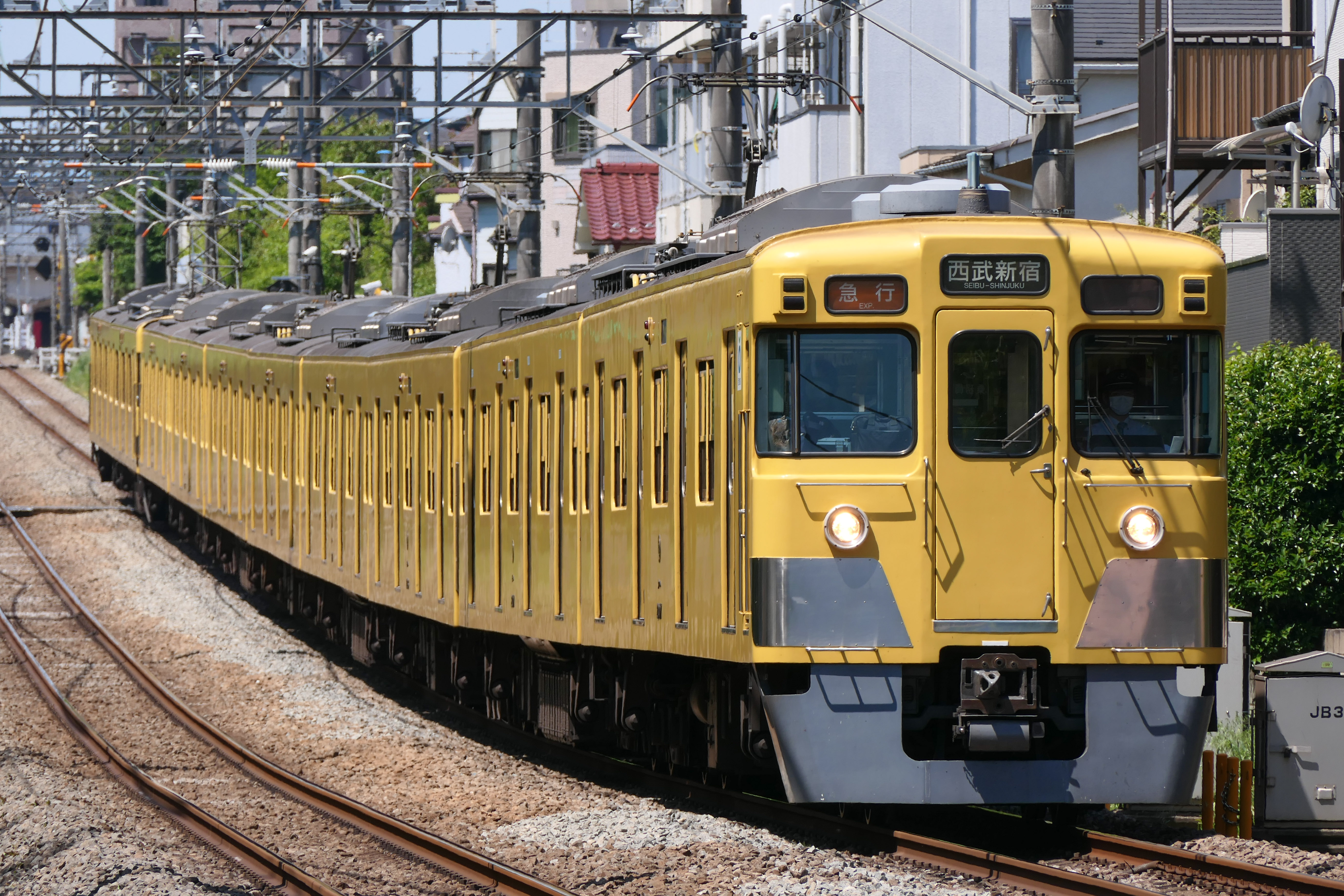
A classic Seibu 2000 series on the Seibu Shinjuku Line

Seibu Ikebukuro Line

* Ekoda, Sakuradai, Nerima, Nakamurabashi, Fujimidai, Nerima-Takanodai, Shakujii-kōen, Ōizumi-gakuen Stations

Seibu Shinjuku Line

* Kami-Shakujii, Musashi-Seki Stations

Seibu Toshima Line

* Nerima, Toshimaen Stations

Seibu Yūrakuchō Line

* Kotake Mukaihara, Shin-Sakuradai, Nerima Stations

==== Tobu Railway ====
Tōbu Tōjō Line

* Tōbu-Nerima and Shimo-Akatsuka Stations are on the boundary with Itabashi

=== Bus ===
- Kanto Bus
- Keio Bus: The Chu 92 bus travels between Nerima and Nakano Stations
- Kokusai-Kogyo Bus
- Seibu Bus
- Toei Bus: The Bus Service Division of the Tokyo Metropolitan Bureau of Transportation operates 5 routes in Nerima Ward.

=== Road ===
- Expressways:
  - Kan-etsu Expressway
  - Tokyo Gaikan Expressway
- National highways:
  - National Route 17 (Shin Ōmiya Bypass)
  - National Route 254 (Kawagoe Kaidō)
- Other major roads:
  - Ōme Kaidō (Prefectural Road 4)
  - Shin-Ōme Kaidō (Prefectural Road 245)
  - Mejiro Dōri (Prefectural Road 8)
  - Hoya Kaidō (Prefectural Road 233)
  - Kan-nana (Prefectural Road 318)
  - Kan-pachi (Prefectural Road 311)
  - Nakasugi Dōri (Prefectural Road 427)
  - Senkawa Dōri (Prefectural Road 439)
  - Fuji Kaidō (Prefectural Road 441)
  - Sasame Dōri (Prefectural Road 443&68)
  - Igusa Dōri (Prefectural Road 444)

== Education ==
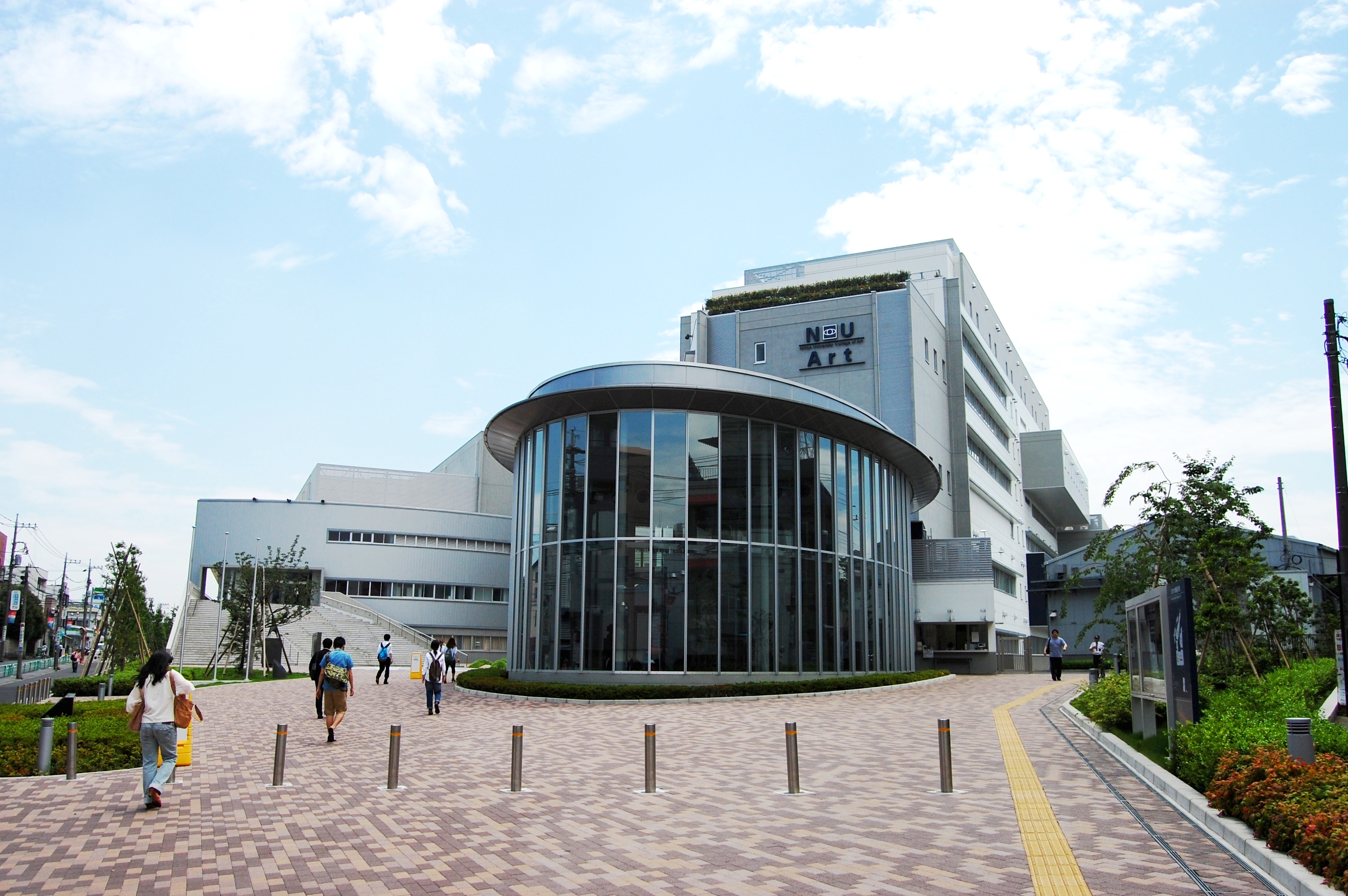
Nihon University Ekoda Campus

=== Colleges and universities ===
- Musashino Academia Musicae
- Musashi University
- Nihon University Ekoda Campus
- Sophia University Shakujii Campus: Faculty of Theology
- Japan Catholic Seminary

=== National schools ===
- Tokyo Gakugei University Oizumi Elementary School (東京学芸大学附属大泉小学校)
- Tokyo Gakugei University International Secondary School (東京学芸大学附属国際中等教育学校)

=== Prefectural high schools ===
- 9 high schools are operated by the Tokyo Metropolitan Government Board of Education

Prefectural high schools:

- Fourth Commercial High School (東京都立第四商業高等学校)
- Hikarigaoka High School (東京都立光丘高等学校)
- Igusa High School (東京都立井草高等学校)
- Nerima High School (東京都立練馬高等学校)
- Nerima Technical High School (東京都立練馬工業高等学校)
- Oizumi High School and Junior High School (東京都立大泉高等学校・附属中学校)
- Oizumi Sakura High School (東京都立大泉桜高等学校)
- Shakujii High School (東京都立石神井高等学校)
- Tagara High School (東京都立田柄高等学校)

=== Municipal schools ===
Nerima City Board of Education (練馬区教育委員会) operates the following:

- 64 elementary schools
- 32 junior high schools
- 1 combined elementary and junior high school

Combined elementary and junior high schools:

- Ōizumi Sakura Gakuen (小中一貫教育校大泉桜学園)

Junior high schools:

- Asahigaoka Junior High School (旭丘中学校)
- Hikarigaoka No. 1 Junior High School (光が丘第一中学校)
- Hikarigaoka No. 2 Junior High School (光が丘第二中学校)
- Hikarigaoka No. 3 Junior High School (光が丘第三中学校)
- Hokei Junior High School (豊渓中学校)
- Kaishin No. 1 Junior High School (開進第一中学校)
- Kaishin No. 2 Junior High School (開進第二中学校)
- Kaishin No. 3 Junior High School (開進第三中学校)
- Kaishin No. 4 Junior High School (開進第四中学校)
- Kami Shakujii Junior High School (上石神井中学校)
- Kitamachi Junior High School (北町中学校)
- Miharadai Junior High School (三原台中学校)
- Minamigaoka Junior High School (南が丘中学校)
- Nakamura Junior High School (中村中学校)
- Nerima Junior High School (練馬中学校)
- Nerima Higashi Junior High School (練馬東中学校)
- Nukui Junior High School (貫井中学校)
- Ōizumi Junior High School (大泉中学校)
- Ōizumi No. 2 Junior High School (大泉第二中学校)
- Ōizumi Gakuen Junior High School (大泉学園中学校)
- Ōizumi Kita Junior High School (大泉北中学校)
- Ōizumi Nishi Junior High School (大泉西中学校)
- Seki Junior High School (関中学校)
- Shakujii Junior High School (石神井中学校)
- Shakujii Higashi Junior High School (石神井東中学校)
- Shakujii Minami Junior High School (石神井南中学校)
- Shakujii Nishi Junior High School (石神井西中学校)
- Tagara Junior High School (田柄中学校)
- Toyotama Junior High School (豊玉中学校)
- Toyotama No. 2 Junior High School (豊玉第二中学校)
- Yahara Junior High School (谷原中学校)
- Yasaka Junior High School (八坂中学校)

Elementary schools:

- Asahicho Elementary School (旭町小学校)
- Asahigaoka Elementary School (旭丘小学校)
- Fujimidai Elementary School (富士見台小学校)
- Hashido Elementary School (橋戸小学校)
- Hayamiya Elementary School (早宮小学校)
- Hikarigaoka No. 8 Elementary School (光が丘第八小学校)
- Hikarigaoka Akinohi Elementary School (光が丘秋の陽小学校)
- Hikarigaoka Harunokaze Elementary School (光が丘春の風小学校)
- Hikarigaoka Natsunokumo Elementary School (光が丘夏の雲小学校)
- Hikarigaoka Shikinokaori Elementary School (光が丘四季の香小学校)
- Hokei Elementary School (豊溪小学校)
- Kaishin No. 1 Elementary School (開進第一小学校)
- Kaishin No. 2 Elementary School (開進第二小学校)
- Kaishin No. 3 Elementary School (開進第三小学校)
- Kaishin No. 4 Elementary School (開進第四小学校)
- Kamishakujii Elementary School (上石神井小学校)
- Kamishakujii Kita Elementary School (上石神井北小学校)
- Kasuga Elementary School (春日小学校)
- Kitahara Elementary School (北原小学校)
- Kitamachi Elementary School (北町小学校)
- Kitamachi Nishi Elementary School (北町西小学校)
- Kotake Elementary School (小竹小学校)
- Kowa Elementary School (光和小学校)
- Koyama Elementary School (向山小学校)
- Minamicho Elementary School (南町小学校)
- Minamigaoka Elementary School (南が丘小学校)
- Minami Tanaka Elementary School (南田中小学校)
- Nakamachi Elementary School (仲町小学校)
- Nakamura Elementary School (中村小学校)
- Nakamura Nishi Elementary School (中村西小学校)
- Nerima Elementary School (練馬小学校)
- Nerima No. 2 Elementary School (練馬第二小学校)
- Nerima No. 3 Elementary School (練馬第三小学校)
- Nerima Higashi Elementary School (練馬東小学校)
- Ōizumi Elementary School (大泉小学校)
- Ōizumi No. 1 Elementary School (大泉第一小学校)
- Ōizumi No. 2 Elementary School (大泉第二小学校)
- Ōizumi No. 3 Elementary School (大泉第三小学校)
- Ōizumi No. 4 Elementary School (大泉第四小学校)
- Ōizumi No. 6 Elementary School (大泉第六小学校)
- Ōizumi Gakuen Elementary School (大泉学園小学校)
- Ōizumi Gakuen Midori Elementary School (大泉学園緑小学校)
- Ōizumi Higashi Elementary School (大泉東小学校)
- Ōizumi Kita Elementary School (大泉北小学校)
- Ōizumi Minami Elementary School (大泉南小学校)
- Ōizumi Nishi Elementary School (大泉西小学校)
- Sekimachi Elementary School (関町小学校)
- Sekimachi Kita Elementary School (関町北小学校)
- Senshin Elementary School (泉新小学校)
- Shakujii Elementary School (石神井小学校)
- Shakujiidai Elementary School (石神井台小学校)
- Shakujii Higashi Elementary School (石神井東小学校)
- Shakujii Nishi Elementary School (石神井西小学校)
- Shimo Shakujii Elementary School (下石神井小学校)
- Tagara Elementary School (田柄小学校)
- Tagara No. 2 Elementary School (田柄第二小学校)
- Takamatsu Elementary School (高松小学校)
- Tateno Elementary School (立野小学校)
- Toyotama Elementary School (豊玉小学校)
- Toyotama No. 2 Elementary School (豊玉第二小学校)
- Toyotama Higashi Elementary School (豊玉東小学校)
- Toyotama Minami Elementary School (豊玉南小学校)
- Yasaka Elementary School (八坂小学校)
- Yawara Elementary School (谷原小学校)

=== Private schools ===
- One elementary school
- Four junior and senior high schools
- One high school
- One international school

They are:

- Fujimi Junior & Senior High School (富士見中学高等学校)
- Musashi High School and Junior High School
- Oizumi Gakuen High School (東京都立大泉学園高等学校)
- Tokyo Joshi Gakuin Junior & Senior High School (junior and senior high school) (東京女子学院中学校・高等学校)
- Waseda University Junior and Senior High School

=== International schools ===
- Aoba-Japan International School

== Media ==
Nerima prepares the Nerima News Azalea, a city newsletter, in English.

== Other ==
- Japan Ground Self-Defense Force Nerima Base
- US Forces, Grant Heights, Family Housing Area, later '40s to 1973.

== International relations ==
Nerima has a twin-town relationship with Ipswich, Queensland, Australia. Nerima Gardens in Ipswich commemorates the tie. It also has a twin-town relationship with Haidian District, Beijing, China.

=== Twin towns ===
- Haidan District, Beijing, China
- Ipswich, Australia
