= Senkawa Aqueduct =

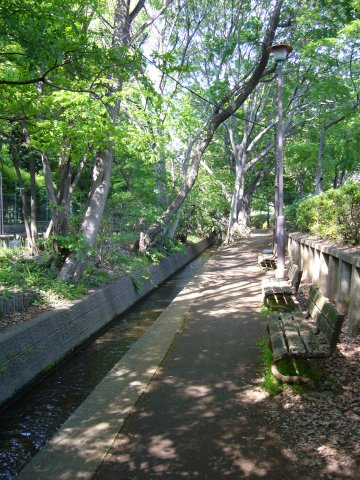
Senkawa Aqueduct on the border of Nishitokyo and Musashino City, Tokyo

Senkawa Aqueduct (千川上水, Senkawa Jōsui) is a 22-kilometre (14 mi) Japanese aqueduct located in Tokyo.

It diverts water from the Tamagawa Aqueduct, which takes water from the Tama River. The river passes through Musashino City, Nishitokyo City, and Nerima Ward.
