= Asahigaoka =

Asahigaoka 旭丘
- Neighborhood (町丁)
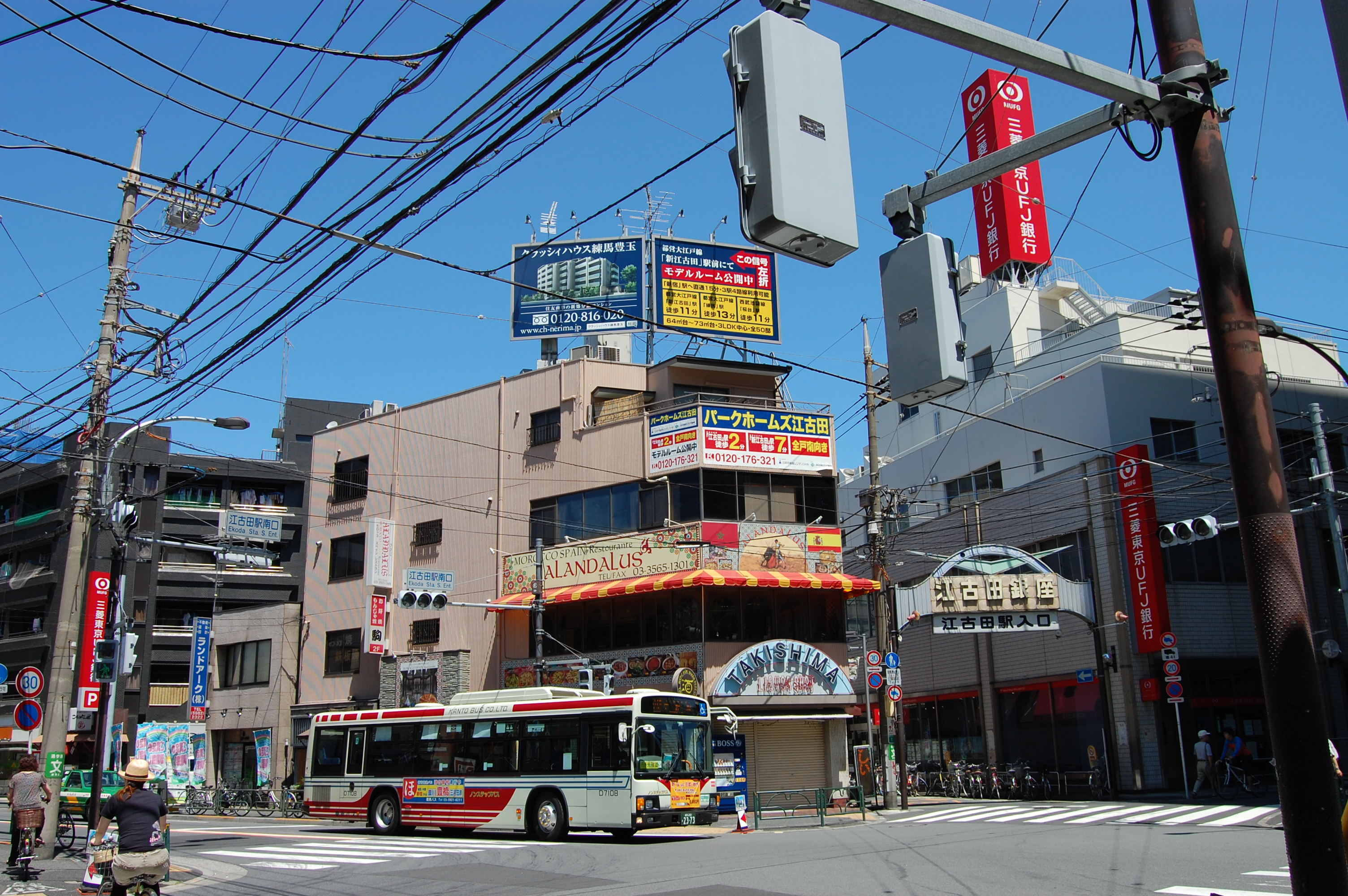
- Ekoda Station South Exit Intersection

- Location of Asahigaoka within Tokyo
- Coordinates: 35°44′13.54″N 139°40′22.25″E
- Country: Japan
- Region: Kantō
- Metropolis: Tokyo
- Ward: Nerima

Area
  - Total: 0.411 km^{2} (0.159 sq mi)

Population (December 1, 2017)
  - Total: 7,259
- Time zone: UTC+9 (JST)
- Zip code: 176-0005
- Area code: 03

Asahigaoka (旭丘) is a neighborhood (町丁) of Nerima Ward in Tokyo, Japan. It is subdivided into two neighborhood blocks (丁目, chōme): Asahigaoka 1-chōme and 2-chōme.

== Education ==
Nerima City Board of Education operates public elementary and junior high schools.

Asahigaoka is zoned to Asahigaoka Elementary School (旭丘小学校), and Asahigaoka Junior High School (練馬区立旭丘中学校).
