= Kotakechō =

Kotakechō 小竹町
- Neighborhood (町丁)
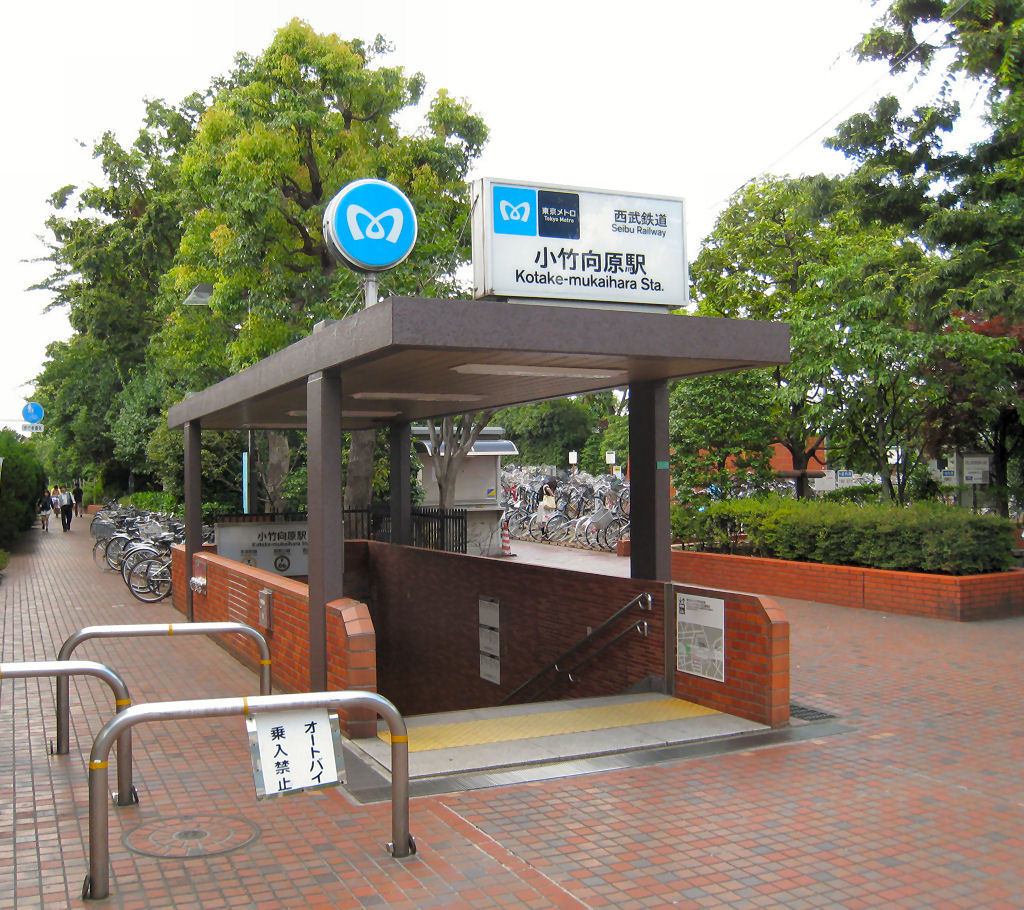
- Kotake Mukaihara Station Exit 2 on June 15, 2008

- Location of Kotakechō within Tokyo
- Coordinates: 35°44′36.57″N 139°40′43.92″E
- Country: Japan
- Region: Kantō
- Metropolis: Tokyo
- Ward: Nerima

Area
  - Total: 0.517 km^{2} (0.200 sq mi)

Population (December 1, 2017)
  - Total: 9,350
- Time zone: UTC+9 (JST)
- Zip code: 176-0004
- Area code: 03

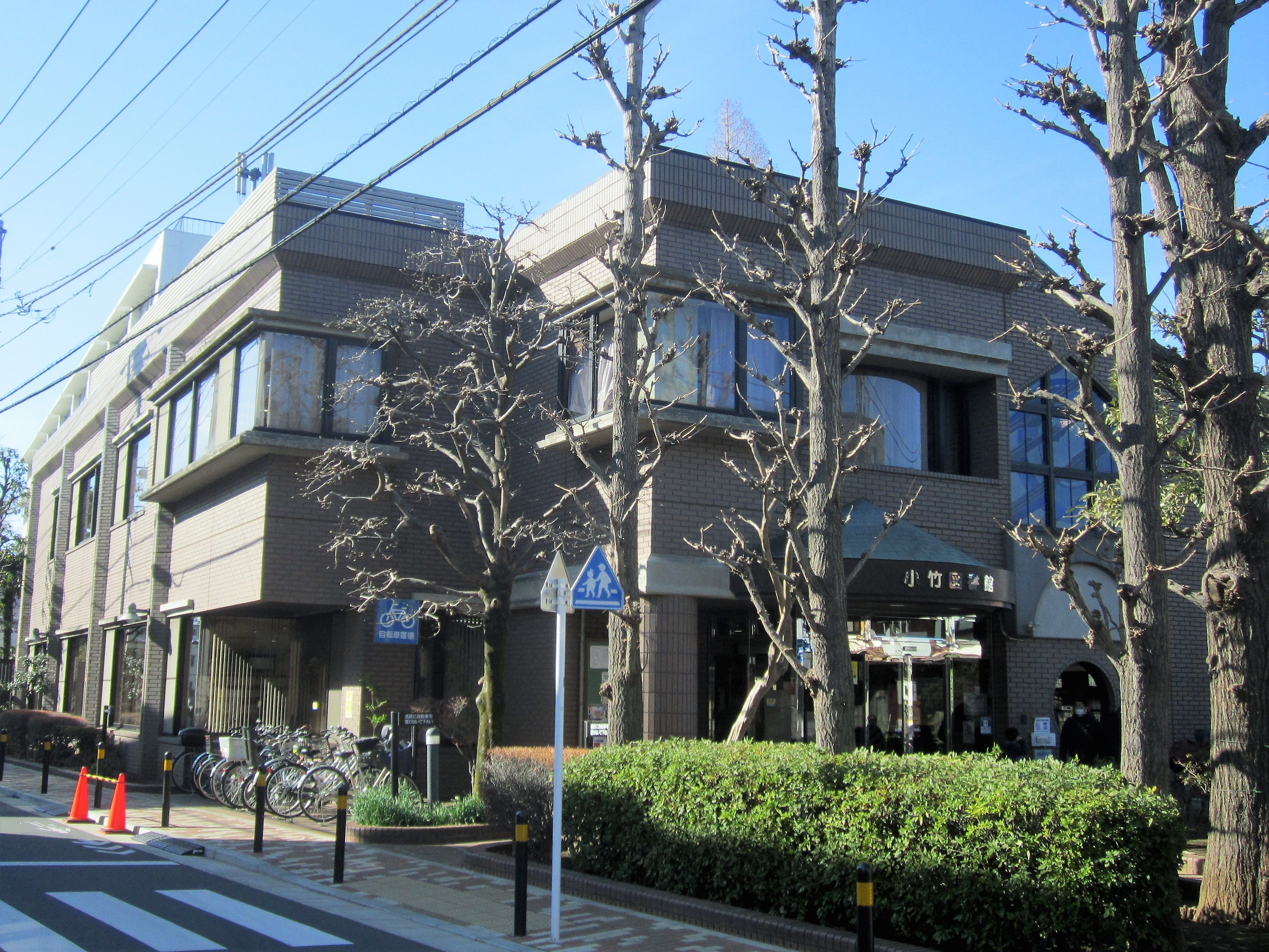
Nerima Ward Kotake Library (小竹図書館)

Kotakechō (小竹町) is a neighborhood (町丁, chōchō) of Nerima Ward in Tokyo, Japan. It is subdivided into two neighborhood blocks (丁目, chōme): Kotakechō 1-chōme and Kotakechō 2-chōme.

== Education ==
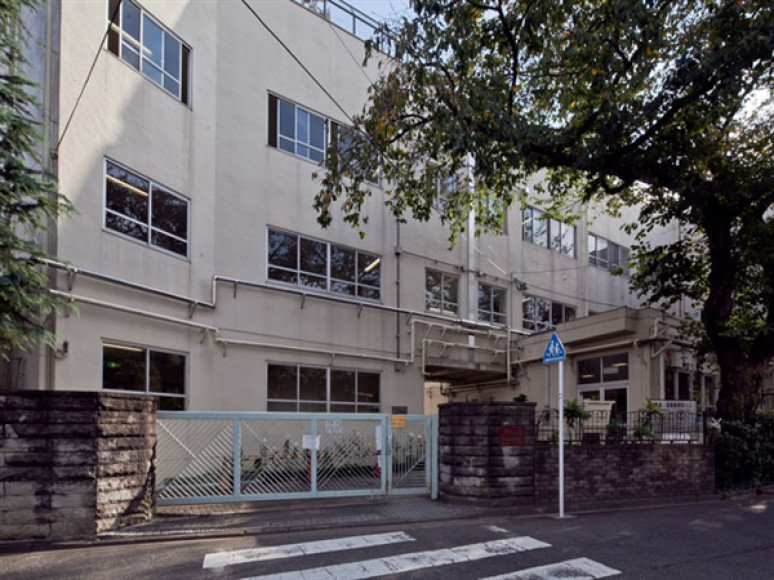
Kotakechō Elementary School (小竹小学校)

Nerima Ward Board of Education operates public elementary and junior high schools.

Kotakechō is zoned to Kotakechō Elementary School (小竹小学校), and Asahigaoka Junior High School (練馬区立旭丘中学校).

== Facilities ==
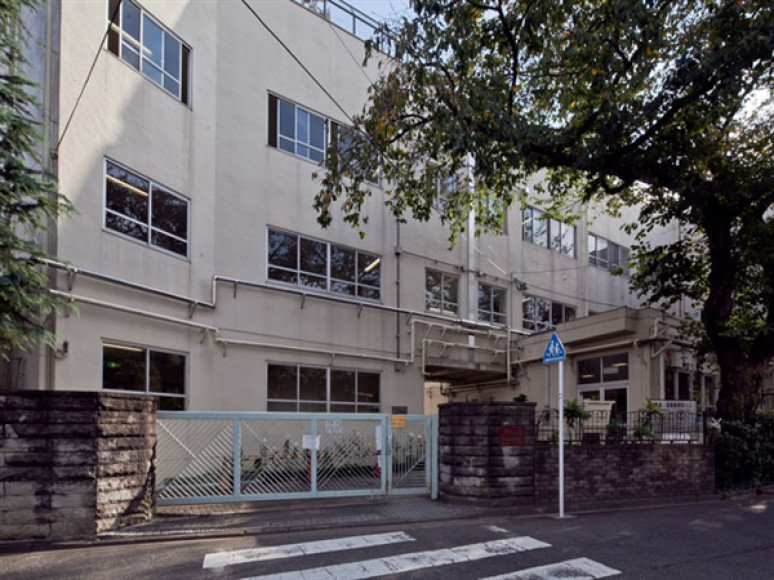
Kotakechō Elementary School (小竹小学校)

The Nerima Ward Kotake Library (小竹図書館) is located in Kotakechō 2-chōme. The library opened 18 July 1990.
