= Sports Park =

Sports Park or Sport Park may refer to:

== Parks ==
- Houston Sports Park
- Mohawk Sports Park
- Minami-Nagasaki Sports Park

== Sports venues ==
- Sports Park, Broxburn
- Dignity Health Sports Park
- Kai Tak Sports Park
- Šiška Sports Park
- Lendava Sports Park
- Stožice Sports Park
- Charlotte Sports Park
- Dignity Health Sports Park
- Domžale Sports Park
- Millennium Sports Park
- Opo Sports Park
- Nova Gorica Sports Park
- Zavrč Sports Park
- Kodeljevo Sports Park
- Aarhus Sports Park
- Beltinci Sports Park
- Aluminij Sports Park
- Odense Sports Park
