= Hamura Kusabana Kyūryō Prefectural Natural Park =

Prefectural natural park of Tokyo, Japan

- 都立羽村草花丘陵自然公園
- Location within Tokyo Location within Japan
- Location: Tokyo, Japan
- Coordinates: 35.75°N 139.3°E
- Area: 5.53 km^{2} (2.14 sq mi)
- Established: 12 March 1953

Hamura Kusabana Kyūryō Prefectural Natural Park (都立羽村草花丘陵自然公園, Toritsu Hamura Kusabana Kyūryō shizen kōen) is a Prefectural Natural Park in Tokyo, Japan. The park was established in 1953.

== See also ==
- National Parks of Japan
- Parks and gardens in Tokyo
