= Fuchū =

Fuchū may refer to:

== Current settlements ==
- Fuchū, Tokyo, a city in Tokyo
- Fuchū, Hiroshima, a city in Hiroshima Prefecture
- Fuchū, Hiroshima (town), a town in Hiroshima Prefecture
- Fuchū, Toyama (婦中), a former town (1889–2005) in Toyama Prefecture, Japan, which is now a district in Toyama City

== Historical entities ==
- Tsushima-Fuchū Domain, whose centre was in what is now Nagasaki prefecture
- Hitachi-Fuchū Domain, whose centre was in what is now Ibaraki prefecture
- Sunpu Domain, for three decades named Suruga-Fuchū Domain, whose centre was in what is now Shizuoka prefecture
- Fuchū-shuku, a former post station on the Tōkaidō
- Fuchū-shuku, a former post station on the Kōshū Kaidō

== Stations ==
- Fuchū Station (Hiroshima)
- Fuchū Station (Tokyo)
- Fuchūhommachi Station (in Fuchū, Tokyo)
- Fuchūkeiba-seimommae Station (in Fuchū, Tokyo)

== Other ==
- Fuchū Prison (in Fuchū, Tokyo)
- Fuchū Air Base (Tokyo)
- Fuchū-no-Mori Park (in Fuchū, Tokyo)

== See also ==
- Ichinomiya
- Kokubunji
