= Himonya Park =

Park in Meguro, Tokyo, Japan

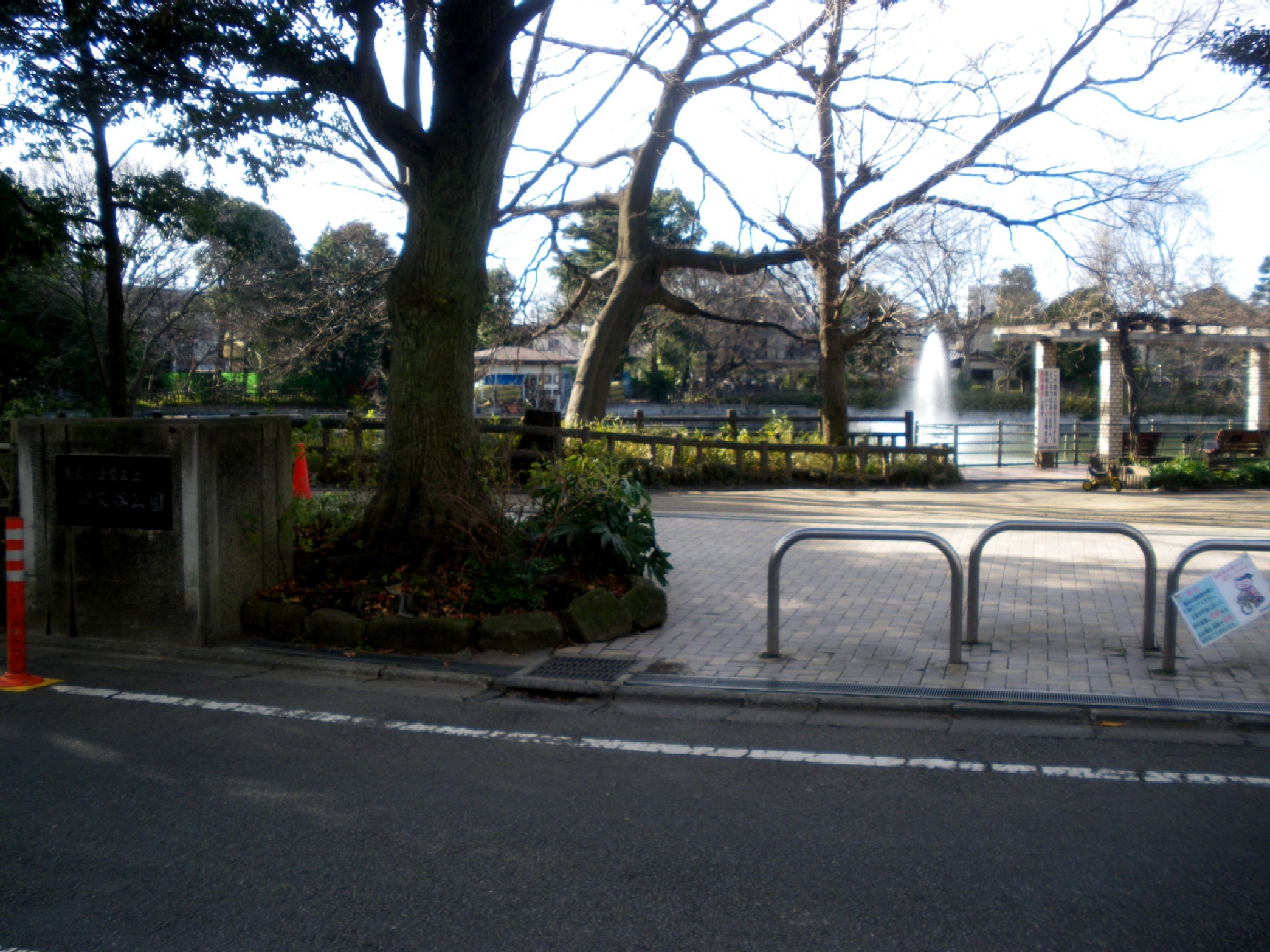
- Fountain in the park
- Interactive map of Himonya Park
- Type: Ward park
- Location: Meguro, Tokyo, Japan
- Coordinates: 35.6265794°N 139.6821967°E
- Area: 43,533 square metres (10.757 acres)
- Created: 15 November 1933
- Public transit: Gakugei-daigaku Station

Himonya Park (碑文谷公園, Himonya Kōen) is a public park located in the Himonya area of Meguro Ward in Tokyo, Japan.

== History ==
The park is centered around Himonya Pond (also known as Benten Pond), which was historically used as an irrigation reservoir for surrounding agricultural land. The area was later developed into a public park and opened in 1933.

Himonya Pond is also one of the water sources of the Tachiai River, along with Shimizu Pond in Shimizuike Park.

== Facilities ==
- Playground areas and landscaped greenery around Himonya Pond
- Children's Animal Square — a small petting area with animals such as ponies, rabbits, and guinea pigs
- Himonya Gymnasium — includes tennis courts and a baseball field
- Boating area — rowboats are available on Himonya Pond (fee required)

The park is divided into northern and southern sections, with sports facilities located in the north and recreational and family-oriented facilities around the pond in the south.

== Access ==
- By train: Approximately 6 minutes on foot from Gakugei-daigaku Station on the Tōkyū Tōyoko Line

== Gallery ==
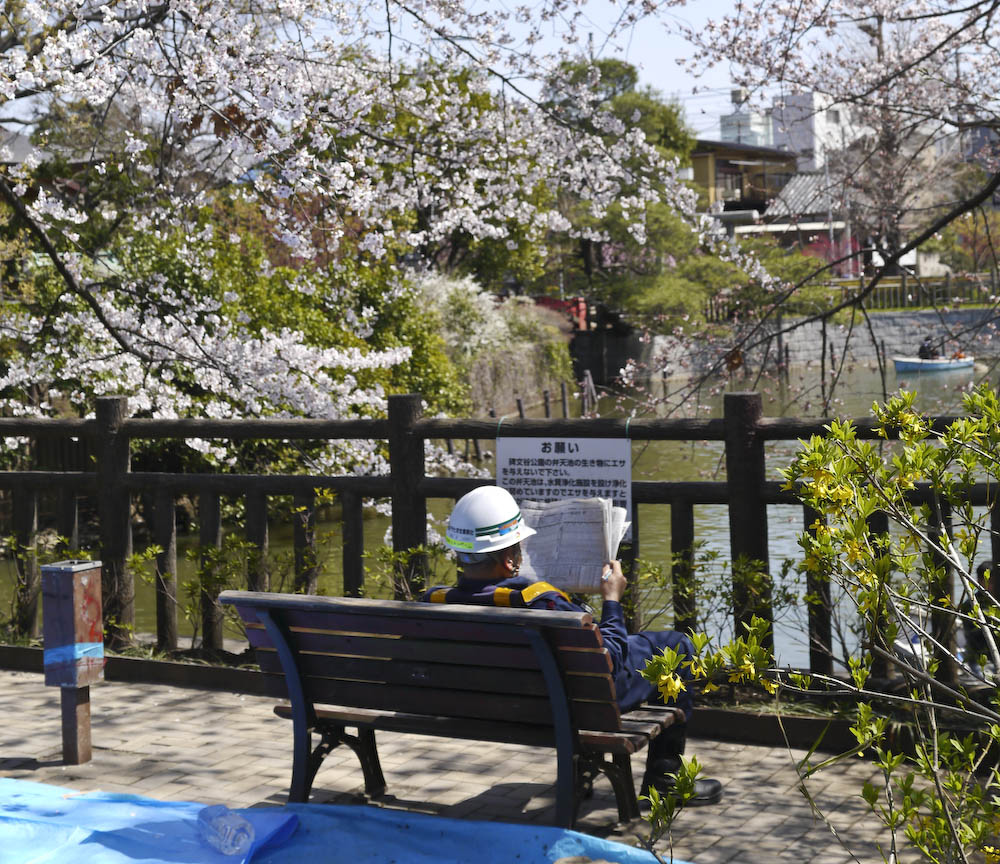
Pond in the park

== See also ==
- Parks and gardens in Tokyo
