= Itabashi Traffic Park =

Park in Itabashi, Tokyo, Japan

Coordinates: 35.7462757°N 139.6948284°E

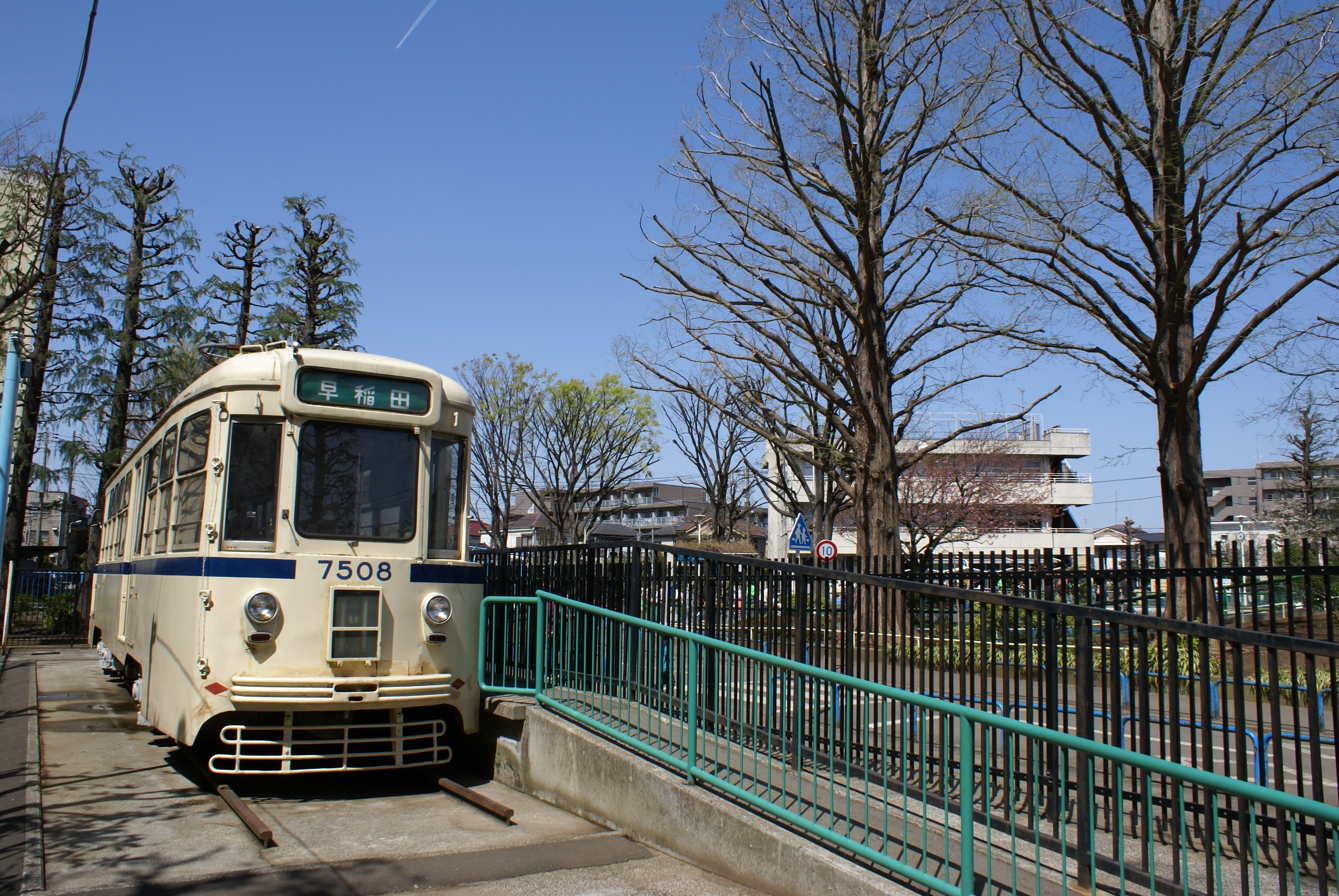
- Tram in the park
- Interactive map of Itabashi Traffic Park
- Location: Itabashi Ward, Tokyo, Japan
- Area: 7,725 square metres (1.909 acres)
- Created: October 1968
- Public transit: Ōyama Station

Itabashi Traffic Park (板橋交通公園, Itabashi Kōtsū Kōen) is a public park in Itabashi Ward, Tokyo, Japan.

== See also ==
- Parks and gardens in Tokyo
- National Parks of Japan
