= Ōizumi-Chūō Park =

Park in Nerima, Tokyo, Japan

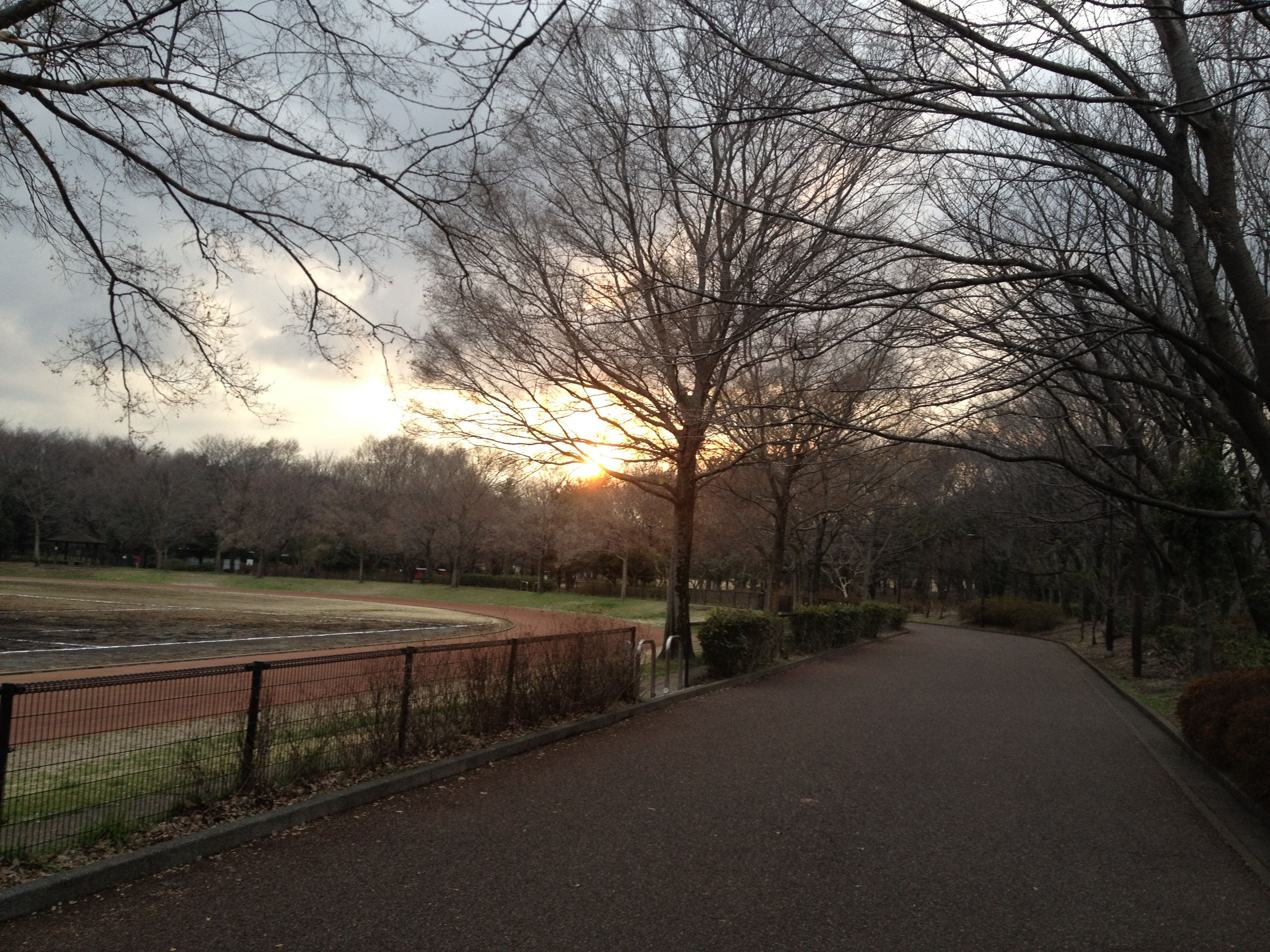
- The park in March
- Interactive map of Ōizumi-Chūō Park
- Type: Metropolitan park
- Location: Nerima Ward, Tokyo, Japan
- Coordinates: 35.775145°N 139.598233°E
- Area: 103,000 square metres (25 acres)
- Created: 1 June 1990
- Public transit: Narimasu Station

Ōizumi-Chūō Park (大泉中央公園, Ōizumi-Chūō Kōen) is a Tokyo metropolitan park located in Nerima Ward, Tokyo, Japan. It was opened in 1990 and covers an area of 103,000 m^{2}.

== Facilities ==
- Water plaza
- Sun plaza
- Four Seasons Square
- Fountain
- Athletics stadium (400 m all-weather track; free for individual use)
- Baseball field (with night lighting; fee required)

The park features open lawns and sports facilities, making it a popular destination for both recreation and athletic activities.

== Access ==
- By train: Approximately 44 minutes on foot from Ōizumi-gakuen Station on the Seibu Ikebukuro Line

== See also ==
- Parks and gardens in Tokyo
