= Hatoba Park =

Park in Chuo, Tokyo, Japan

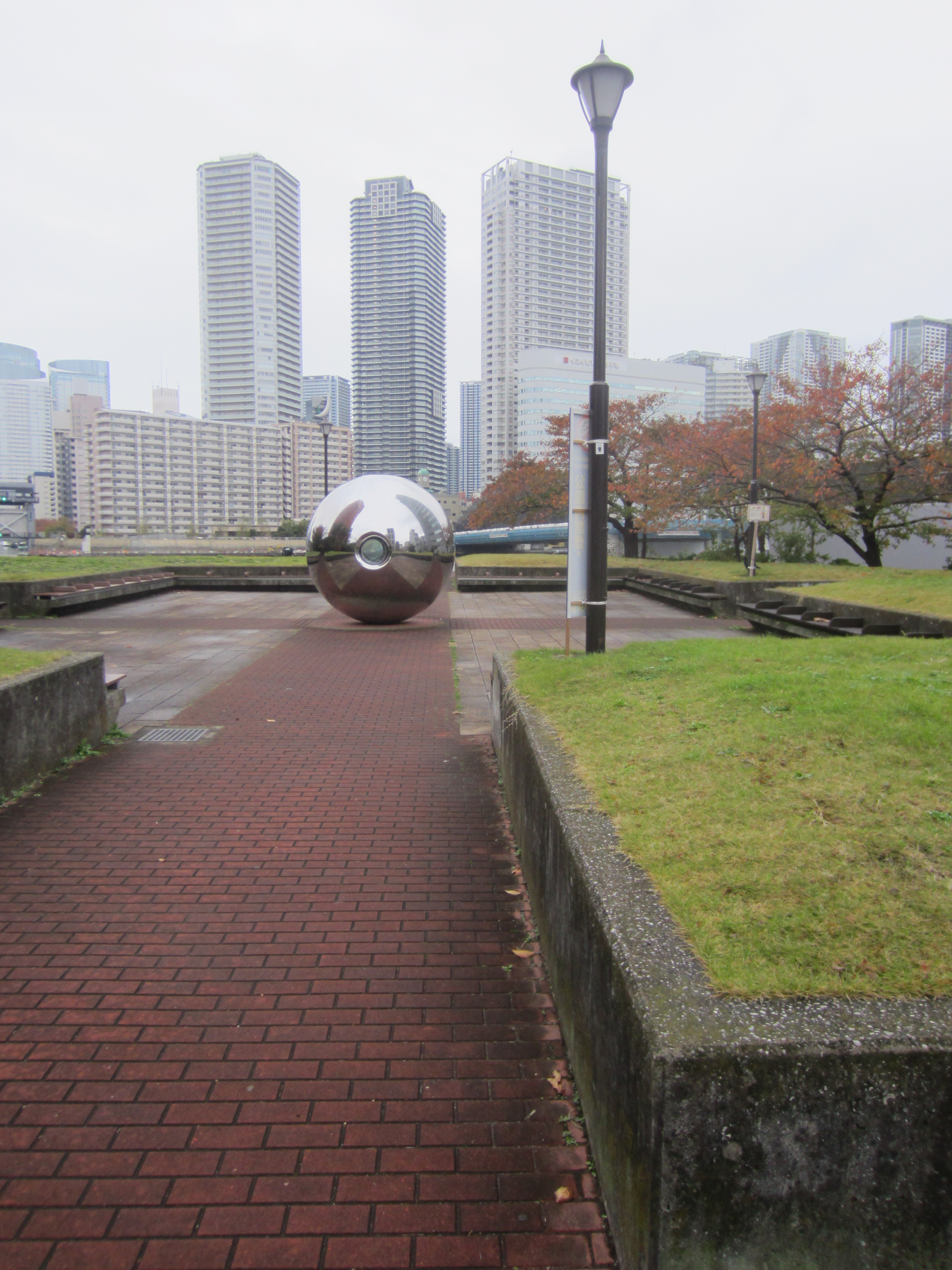
- The park in 2019

- Location within Special wards of Tokyo
- Location: Chūō, Tokyo, Japan
- Coordinates: 35.66399°N 139.77513°E
- Area: Approx. 17,700 sq. mtrs

Hatoba Park (はとば公園) is a park along the Sumida River, northeast of Kachidoki Bridge, in Chūō, Tokyo, Japan.

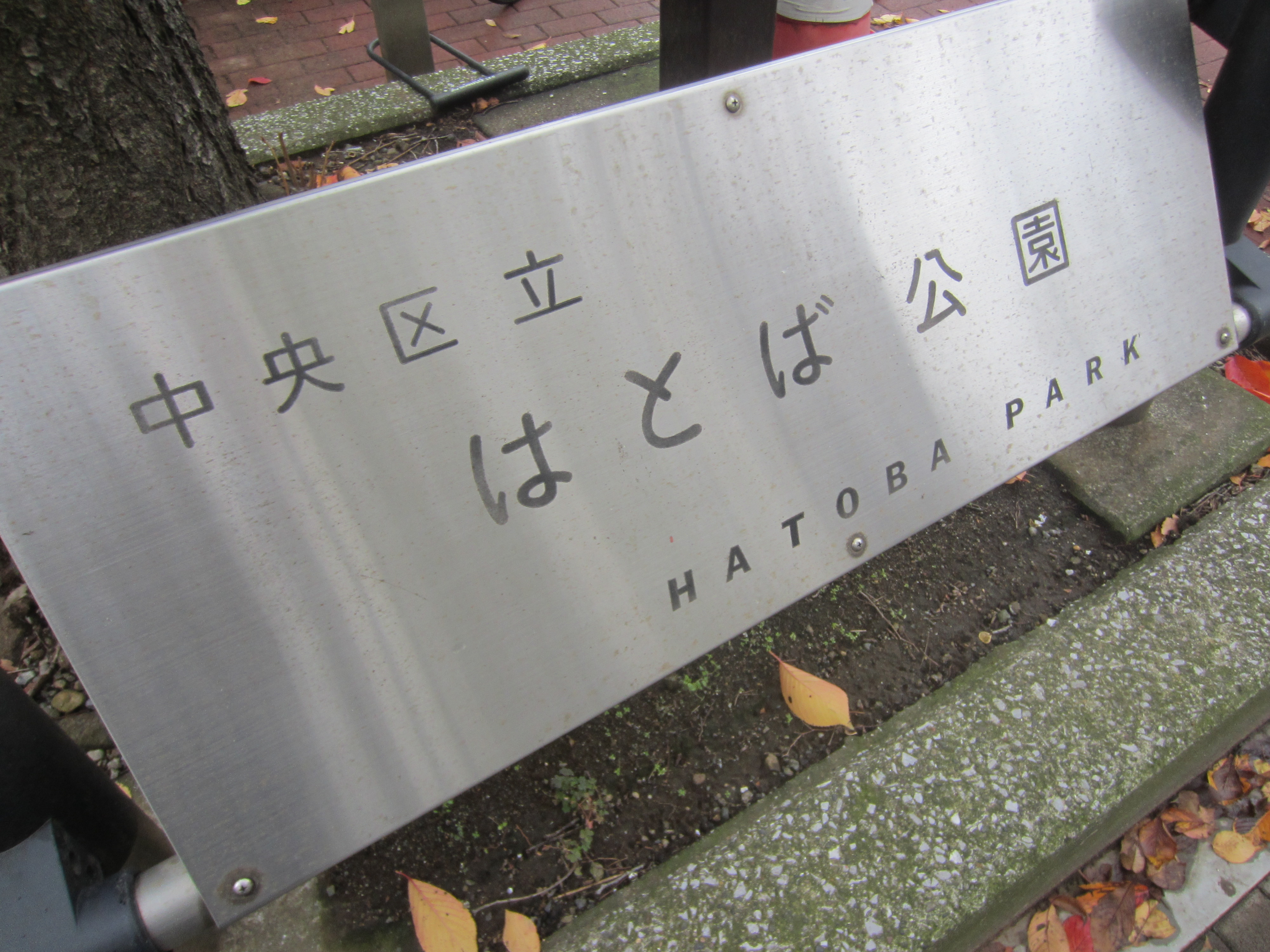
Park signage

== See also ==
- List of parks and gardens in Tokyo
