= Akabane Nature Observatory Park =

Park in Kita, Tokyo, Japan

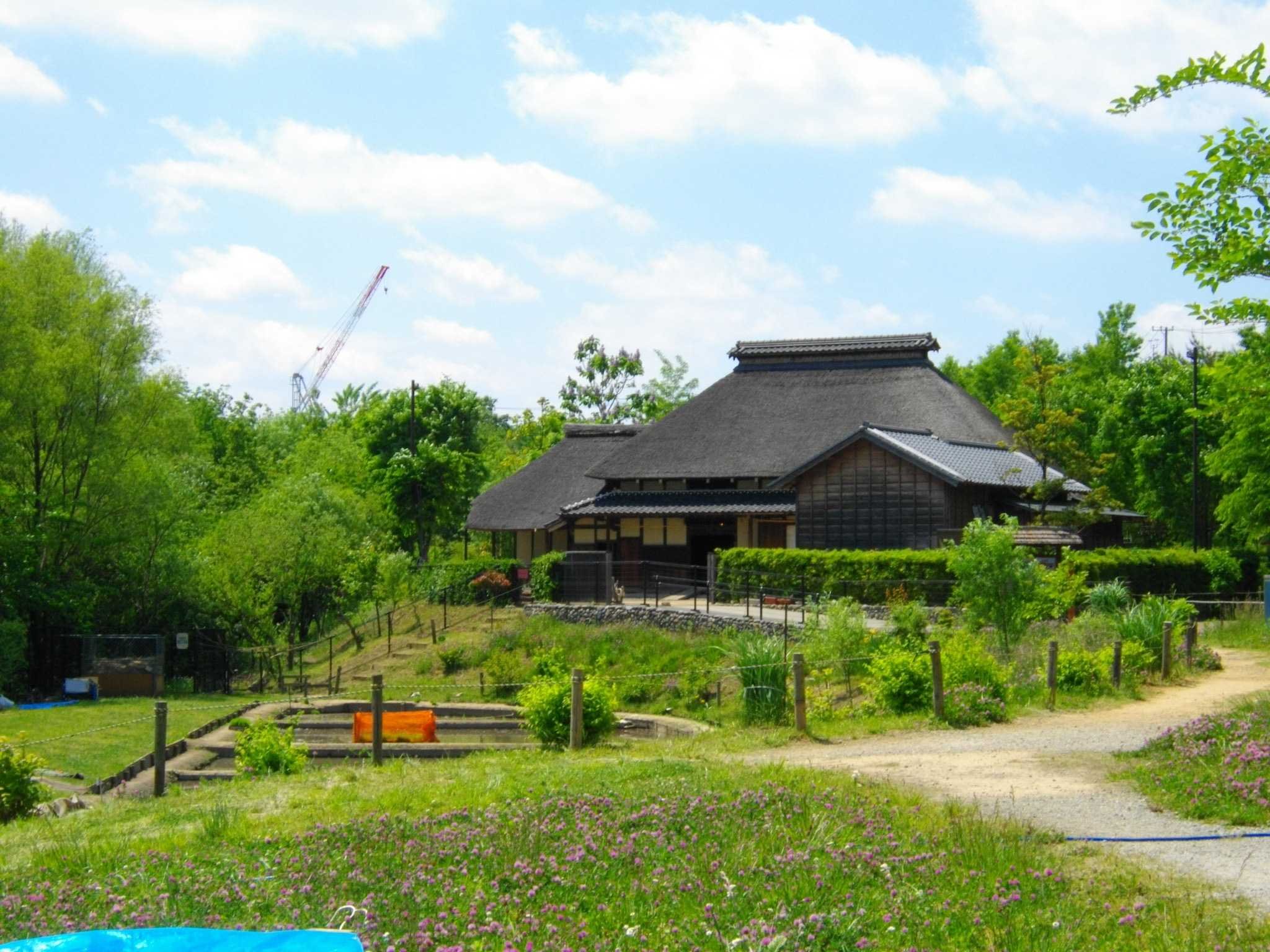
- Old farmhouse in the park
- Interactive map of Akabane Nature Observatory Park
- Location: Kita Ward, Tokyo, Japan
- Coordinates: 35.773355°N 139.709810°E
- Area: 54,020 square metres (13.35 acres)
- Created: 1 April 1999
- Public transit: Akabane Station

Akabane Nature Observatory Park (赤羽自然観察公園, Akabane Shizen Kansatsu Kōen) is a public park for viewing nature in Kita Ward, Tokyo, Japan.

== History ==
A portion of the former Akabane Detachment of the JGSDF Garrison, the park was opened on 1 April 1999. There are springs in the park, and they have been utilized to restore the nature that was once seen in this area. The park is maintained so that the visitors can observe and touch nature, as shown in the name of the park, with free admission.

== Facilities ==
- Acorn forest
- Paddy field
- Spring water (one of the famous spring waters in Tokyo)
- Day camp field (barbecues possible; permission required)
- Multipurpose square (permission required)
- Forest of Peace
- Kita Ward’s Hometown & Farmhouse Experience Hall—A tangible cultural property designated by Kita Ward
- Parking for cars (park office needs to be contacted in advance)

== Access ==
By train:

- 13 minutes’ walk from the West Exit of Akabane Station
- 13 minutes’ walk from Motohasunuma Station on the Toei Mita Line

== Gallery ==
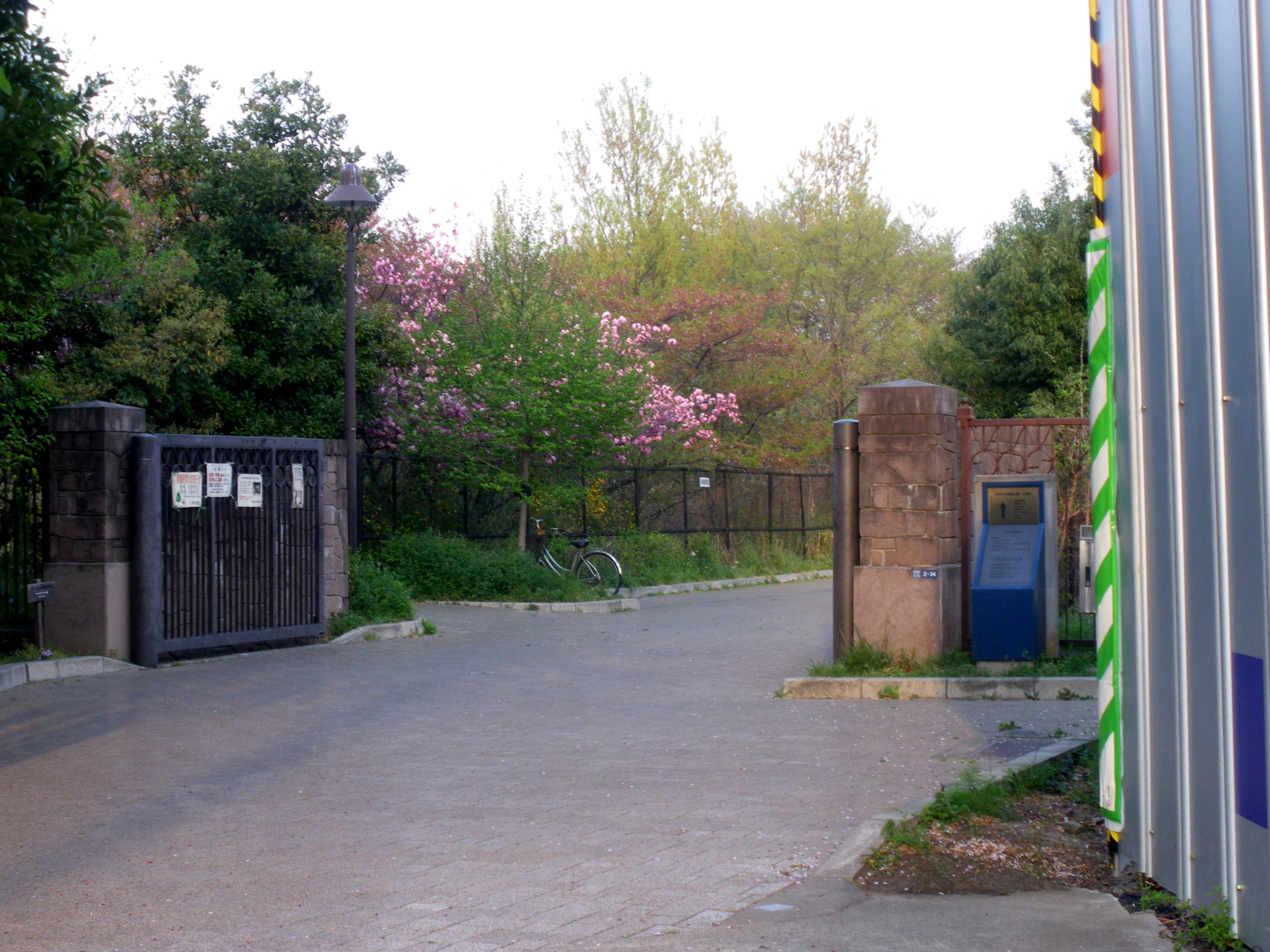
Entrance to the park

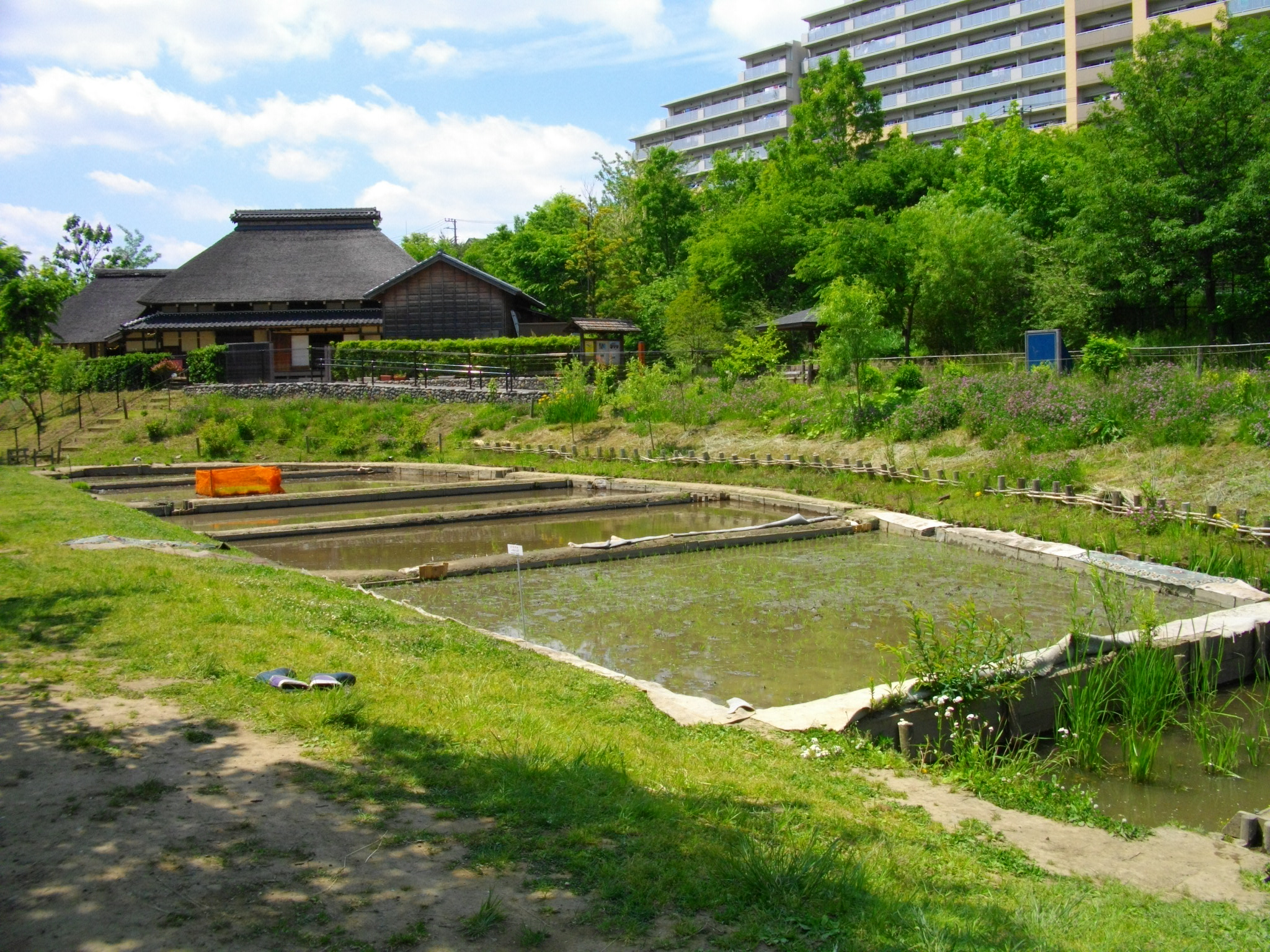
Paddy field in the park

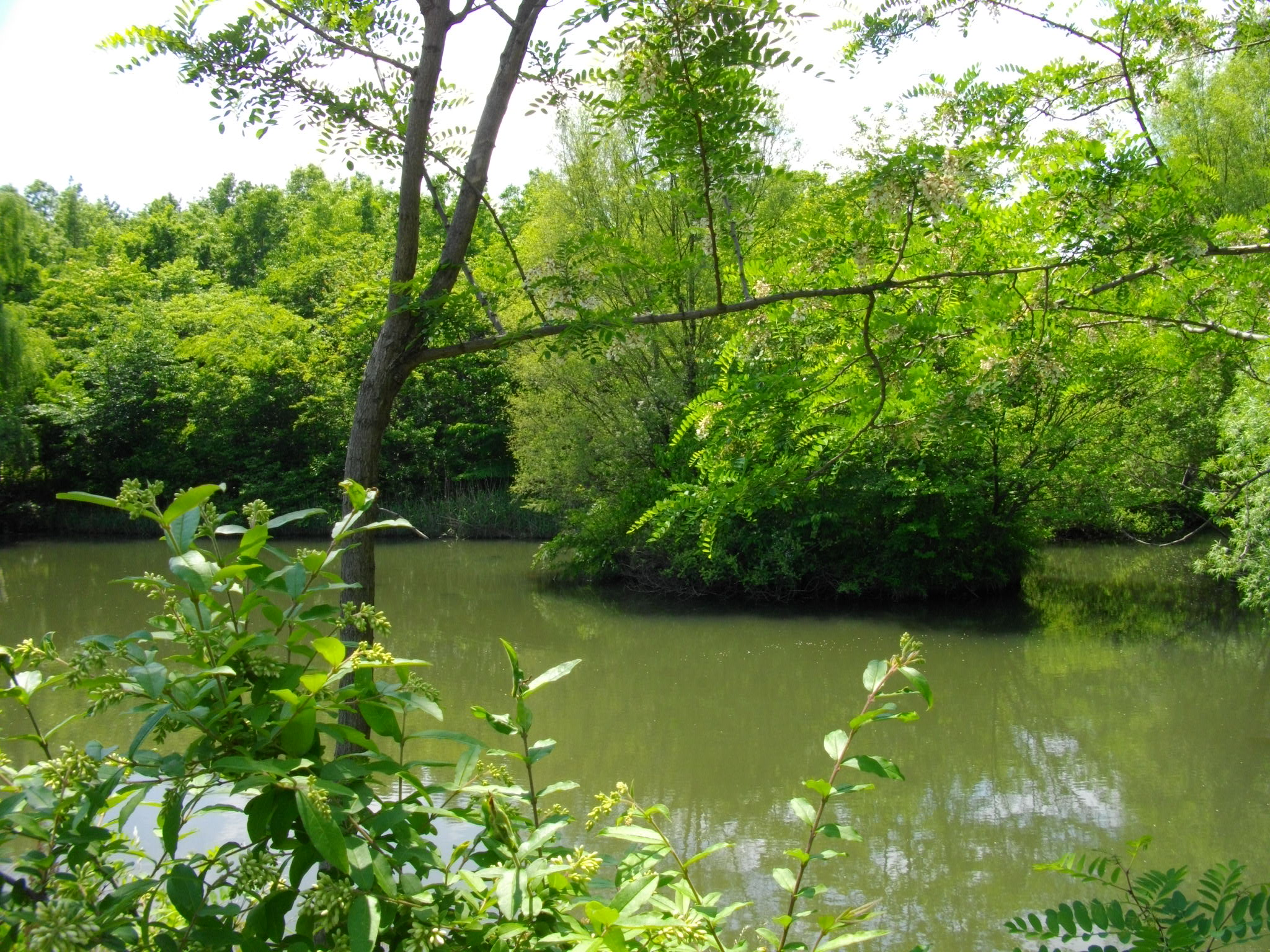
Mizudori-no-Ike (Waterfowl Pond)

== See also ==
- Parks and gardens in Tokyo
- National Parks of Japan
