= Akatsuka Park =

Park in Itabashi-ku, Tokyo, Japan

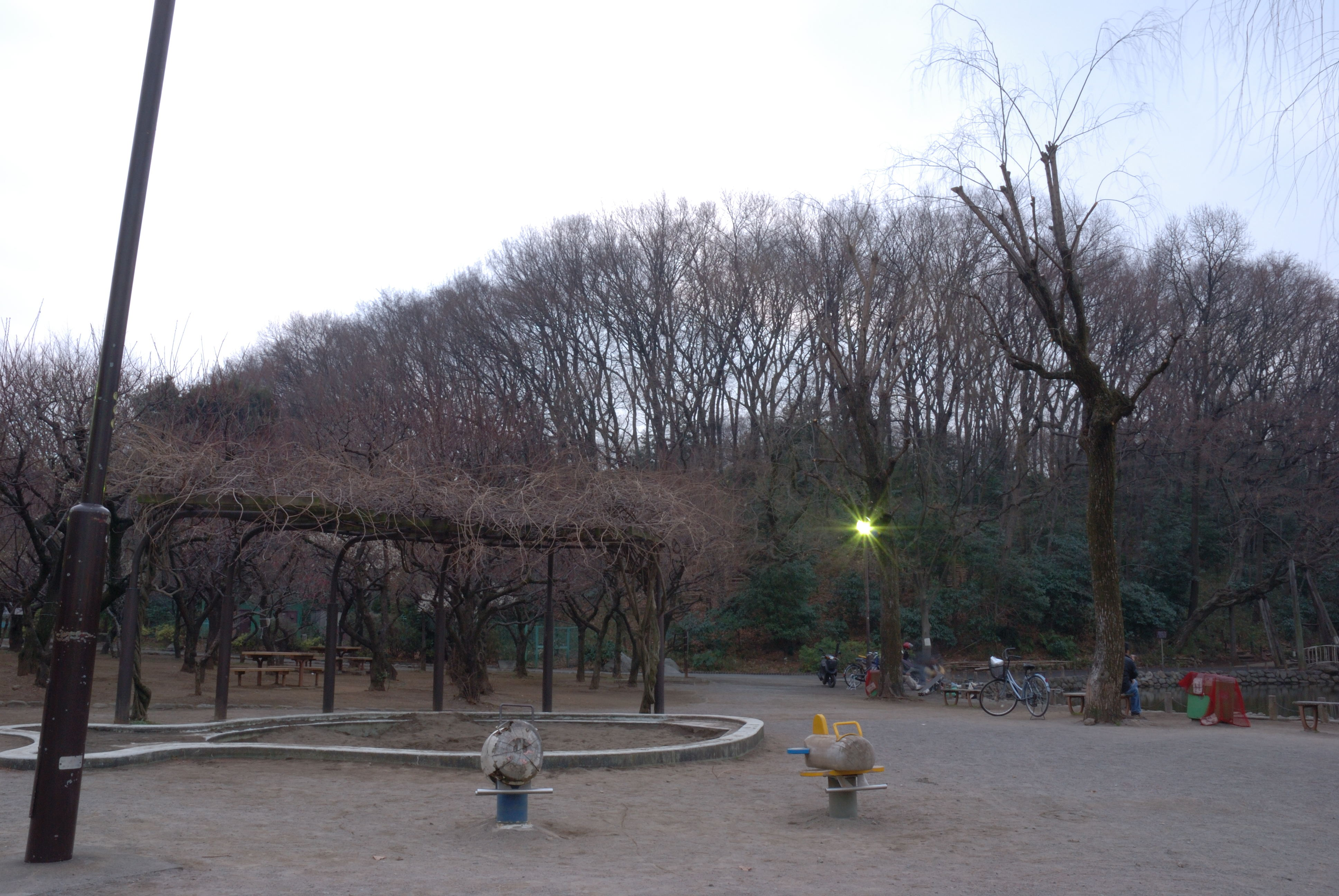
- Akatsuka Castle ruins
- Interactive map of Akatsuka Park
- Location: Itabashi Ward, Tokyo, Japan
- Coordinates: 35.784908°N 139.657066°E
- Area: 250,466.84 square metres (61.89170 acres)
- Created: 1 June 1974
- Public transit: Takashimadaira Station

Akatsuka Park (東京都立赤塚公園, Tōkyō Toritsu Akatsuka Kōen) is a public park in Itabashi Ward, Tokyo, Japan. The ruins of Akatsuka Castle can be found at the west end of the park.

== Facilities ==
- Baseball field (1)
- Tennis courts (7)
- Athletics field (300m track)
- Barbecue area

== Hilly area ==
The park contains a 70 m wide hilly area, which corresponds to the cliffline of the Musashino Terrace, and it extends for 2.3 km. Part of this area is a bird sanctuary. Further, soft windflower, the official flower of Itabashi Ward, grows naturally in a forest that covers these hills (the Daimon area of Akatsuka Park). This is the largest area of wild soft windflower growth in Tokyo. They grow over an area as large as 20 meters deep and 200 meters east and west.

== Access ==
By train:

- 10 minutes’ walk from Takashimadaira Station on the Toei Mita Line

== See also ==
- Parks and gardens in Tokyo
- National Parks of Japan
