= Noyamakita-Rokudōyama Park =

Public park in Tokyo, Japan

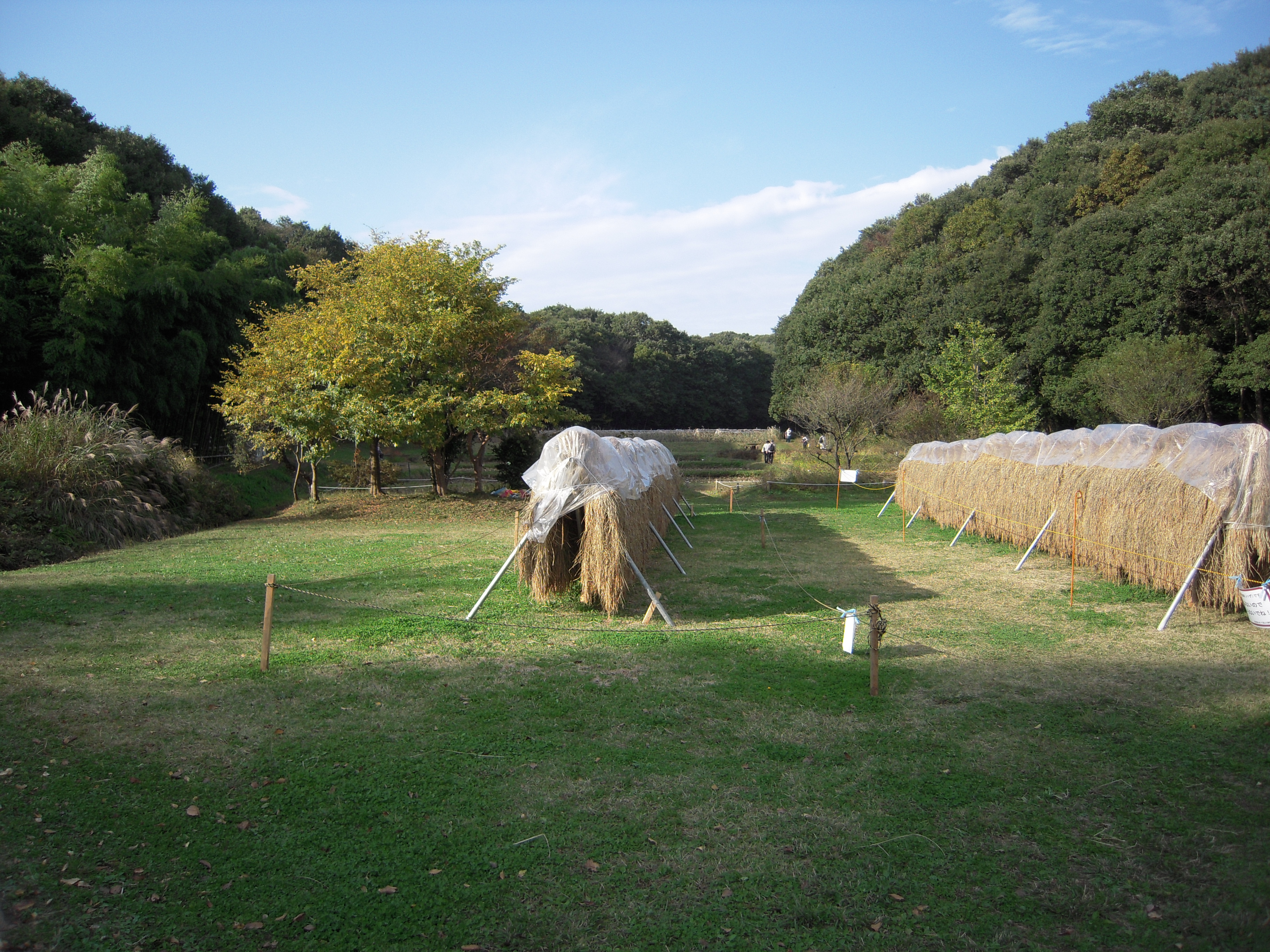
- Undeveloped woodland (satoyama) in the park
- Interactive map of Noyamakita-Rokudōyama Park
- Location: Musashimurayama, Tokyo, Japan
- Coordinates: 35.764588°N 139.378560°E
- Area: 1,323,900 square metres (327.1 acres)
- Created: June 1988
- Public transit: Hakonegasaki Station

Noyamakita-Rokudōyama Park (野山北・六道山公園, Noyamakita-Rokudōyama Kōen) is a public park located in the Sayama hills and stretching from the city of Musashimurayama to the town of Mizuho in Tokyo, Japan. With an area of 1,323,900 m^{2}, it is the second-largest park in the prefecture of Tokyo.

== Overview ==
Noyamakita-Rokudōyama Park is located at the western end of Sayama Prefectural Natural Park. It is a combination of thick woods and a valley (a valley cut into a hill).

== Access ==
- By train: 30 minutes’ walk from Hakonegasaki Station on the Hachikō Line (buses are available)

== See also ==
- Parks and gardens in Tokyo
- National Parks of Japan
