= Arakawa Nature Park =

Park in Tokyo, Japan

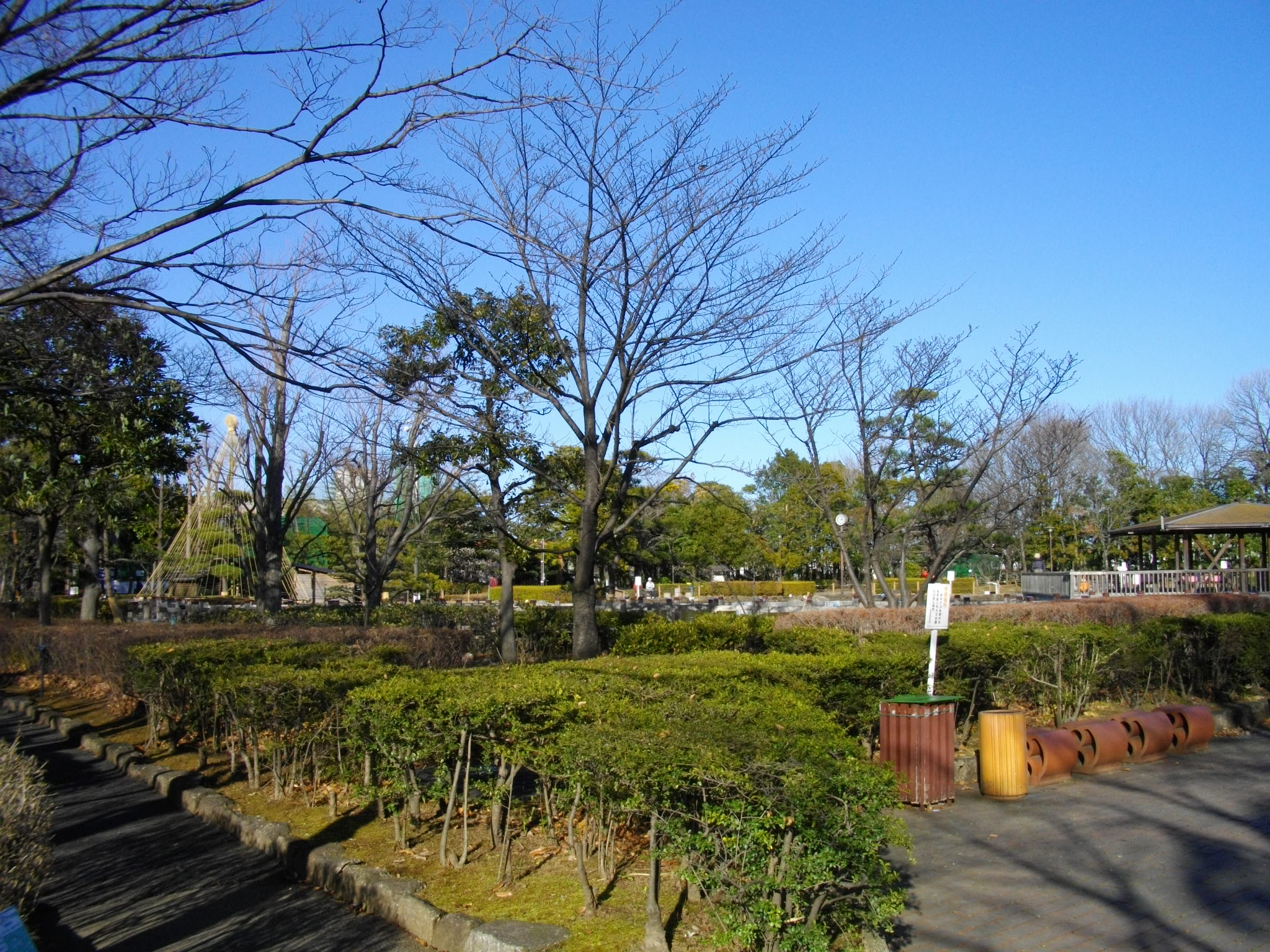
- Interactive map of Arakawa Nature Park
- Location: Arakawa, Tokyo, Tokyo, Japan
- Area: 61,068 square metres (15.090 acres)
- Created: 26 April 1974
- Public transit: Machiya Station 35.741°N 139.786°E

Arakawa Nature Park (荒川自然公園, Arakawa shizen koen) is a park in Arakawa, Tokyo. It was first opened in 1974, and is built on artificial ground placed over the Tokyo Mikawashima Wastewater Treatment Plant. The park features a garden, playground, bicycle track for children, baseball field, and tennis courts. In 1982 it was selected as one of the 'New Tokyo 100 Views.'

== Facilities ==
- Tennis courts
- Athletic corner
- Wildflower area
- Swan pond
- Omurasaki Observation Garden — Japanese emperor butterflies can be seen here in the summer
- Insect observation garden — Various beetles can be seen here in the summer
- Waterfront open space
- Observation platform

== Access ==
- By train: 10 minutes’ walk from Machiya Station on the Keisei Main Line and Tokyo Metro Chiyoda Line

== See also ==
- Parks and gardens in Tokyo
- National Parks of Japan
