= List of parks and gardens in Tokyo =

Parks and gardens in Tokyo, Japan

== Urban parks and gardens ==
Park	Location	Created	Area (m^{2})	Type	Remarks
Akabane Nature Observatory Park	Kita	1999	54,020	Ward park	
Akatsuka Park	Itabashi	1974	250,466	Metropolitan park	Largest park wholly in Itabashi Ward
Akinohi Park	Nerima	1988	18,200	Ward park	
Arakawa Nature Park	Arakawa	1974	61,068	Ward park	Largest park in Arakawa Ward
Arisugawa-no-miya Memorial Park	Minato	1934	67,131	Metropolitan park	Largest park in Minato Ward
Asukayama Park	Kita	1873	73,000	Metropolitan park	Largest park in Kita Ward
Chihaya Flower Park	Toshima	1990	5,542	Ward park	
Chinzan-so Garden	Bunkyō	1952	40,000	Garden	
East Garden of the Imperial Palace	Chiyoda	1968	210,000	National garden	
Egota-no-Mori Park	Nakano	1971	60,224	Ward park	Largest park in Nakano Ward
Fuchū-no-Mori Park	Fuchū	1991	169,748	Metropolitan park	
Hamarikyu Gardens	Chūō	1946	250,215	Metropolitan garden	Largest park in Chūō Ward
Hatoba Park	Chūō		17,700	Ward park	
Heiwa-no-Mori Park	Ōta	1982	99,000	Ward park	Largest park wholly in Ōta Ward
Heiwa-no-Mori Park	Nakano	1985	70,441	Ward park	
Hibiya Park	Chiyoda	1903	161,636	Metropolitan park	
Higashi-Ayase Park	Adachi	1966	158,969	Metropolitan park	
Higo Hosokawa Garden	Bunkyō	1961	500	Garden	
Hikarigaoka Park	Itabashi and Nerima	1974	607,823	Metropolitan park	Largest park in Nerima Ward
Himonya Park	Meguro	1933	43,533	Ward park	
Ikebukuro Nishiguchi Park	Toshima	1970	3,123	Ward park	
Inokashira Park	Kichijōji	1918	385,844	Metropolitan park	
Itabashi Traffic Park	Itabashi	1968	7,725	Ward park	
Italy Park	Minato	2003	3,660	Ward park	
Jindai Botanical Garden	Chōfu	1961	425,433	Metropolitan botanical garden	
Jōhoku-Chūō Park	Itabashi and Nerima	1957	262,369	Metropolitan park	
Kamezuka Park	Minato	1952	9,183	Ward park	
Kamichiba Sunahara Park	Katsushika	1968	20,982	Ward park	
Kansen-en Park	Shinjuku	1969	14,000	Ward park	
Kasai Rinkai Park	Edogawa	1989	805,861	Metropolitan park	Largest park in Edogawa Ward
Kiba Park	Kōtō	1992	238,711	Metropolitan park	
Kinshi Park	Sumida	1928	56,124	Ward park	Largest park in Sumida Ward
Kinuta Park	Setagaya	1957	391,777	Metropolitan park	Largest park in Setagaya Ward
Kitaku Central Park	Kita	1958	65,620	Ward park	
Kitanomaru Park	Chiyoda	1969	193,297	National garden	
Kiyosumi Garden	Fukagawa	1932	37,434	Metropolitan garden	
Koganei Park	Kodaira, Koganei, Musashino, and Nishitōkyō	1954	793,544	Metropolitan park	
Koishikawa Botanical Garden	Bunkyō	1877	161,588	Botanical garden	Largest gardens in Bunkyō Ward
Koishikawa Kōrakuen Garden	Bunkyō	1629	70,847	Metropolitan garden	
Kokyo Gaien National Garden	Chiyoda	1949	450,000	National garden	Largest park in Chiyoda Ward
Komaba Park	Meguro	1975	40,400	Ward park	
Komazawa Olympic Park	Meguro and Setagaya	1964	413,537	Metropolitan park	
Kōyama Garden	Nerima	1980	2,613	Garden	
Kyū-Furukawa Gardens	Kita	1956	30,780	Metropolitan garden	
Kyū-Iwasaki-tei Garden	Taitō	2001	16,912	Garden	
Kyū Shiba Rikyū Garden	Chūō	1924	42,035	Metropolitan garden	
Makino Memorial Garden	Nerima	1958	2,576	Garden	
Meguro Sky Garden	Meguro	2013	75,000	Ward park	
Meiji Shrine Inner Garden	Shibuya		83,000	Garden	
Meiji Shrine Outer Garden	Minato and Shinjuku	1926	580,000	Garden	
Mejiro-no-Mori	Toshima	1997	3,201	Ward park	
Minami-Ikebukuro Park	Toshima	2016	7,811	Ward park	
Minami-Nagasaki Sports Park	Toshima	2013	12,226	Ward park	Largest park in Toshima Ward
Mitsugi Park	Itabashi	1952	14,000	Ward park	
Miyashita Park	Shibuya	1930	10,808	Ward park	
Mizumoto Park	Katsushika	1965	921,539	Metropolitan park	Largest park in Katsushika Ward; largest park in Tokyo's 23 wards
Mizunoto Park	Nakano	1930	2,272	Ward park	
Mukōjima-Hyakkaen Garden	Sumida	1939	8,718	Metropolitan garden	
Mure-no-Sato Park	Mitaka	1995	5,800	City park	
Musashino Central Park	Musashino	1989	100,898	Metropolitan park	
Musashiseki Park	Nerima	1938	45,985	Metropolitan park	
Naganuma Park	Hachiōji	1980	313,486	Metropolitan park	
Nakagawa Park	Adachi	1986	120,698	Ward park	
Nakano Shiki no Mori Park	Nakano	2012	20,780	Ward park	
Nogawa Park	Chōfu	1980	399,764	Metropolitan park	
Noyamakita-Rokudōyama Park	Musashimurayama	1988	1,323,900	Metropolitan park	
Ōi Futō Chūō Kaihin Park	Ōta and Shinagawa	1978	454,271	Metropolitan park	Largest park in Shinagawa Ward
Ōizumi-Chūō Park	Nerima	1990	103,000	Metropolitan park	
Ōkuma Garden	Shinjuku	1922	3,000	Garden	
Ōjima Komatsugawa Park	Edogawa and Kōtō	1997	249,282	Metropolitan park	
Rikugi-en Gardens	Bunkyō	1938	87,809	Metropolitan garden	
Rinshi-no-mori Park	Meguro and Shinagawa	1989	120,762	Metropolitan park	
Saigōyama Park	Meguro	1981	10,549	Ward park	Largest park wholly in Meguro Ward
Sarue Onshi Park	Kōtō	1932	145,088	Metropolitan park	
Shakujii Park	Nerima	1959	223,785	Metropolitan park	
Shikinokaori Park	Nerima	1985	42,109	Ward park	
Shimizuike Park	Meguro	1935	5,795	Ward park	
Shinjuku Central Park	Shinjuku	1968	88,065	Ward park	
Shinjuku Gyo-en	Shibuya and Shinjuku	1949	583,000	National garden	Largest park in Shinjuku Ward
Showa Memorial Park	Tachikawa	1983	1,653,000	National government park	Largest park in Tokyo
Sumida Park	Sumida and Taitō	1931	107,797	Metropolitan park	
Takaido Park	Suginami	2020	95,000	Metropolitan park	
Tetsugaku-dō Park	Nakano and Shinjuku	1904	52,494	Metropolitan park	
Toneri Park	Adachi	1940	628,603	Metropolitan park	Largest park in Adachi Ward
Tonogayato Garden	Kokubunji	1979	21,124	Metropolitan garden	
Ueno Park	Taitō	1873	538,506	Metropolitan park	Largest park in Taitō Ward
Ukima Park	Itabashi and Kita	1967	117,330	Metropolitan park	
Ukimatsuribori Park	Kita	1960	3,000	Ward park	
Wadabori Park	Suginami	1964	199,936	Metropolitan park	Largest park in Suginami Ward
Wakasu Seaside Park	Kōtō	1990	32,000	Ward park	
Yokoamichō Park	Sumida	1930	19,580	Metropolitan park	
Yoyogi Park	Shibuya	1967	541,000	Metropolitan park	Largest park in Shibuya Ward
Yumenoshima Park	Kōtō	1978	433,212	Metropolitan park	Largest park in Kōtō Ward
Zenpukuji Park	Suginami	1961	80,264	Metropolitan park	
