= Minami-Ikebukuro Park =

Public park in northern Tokyo

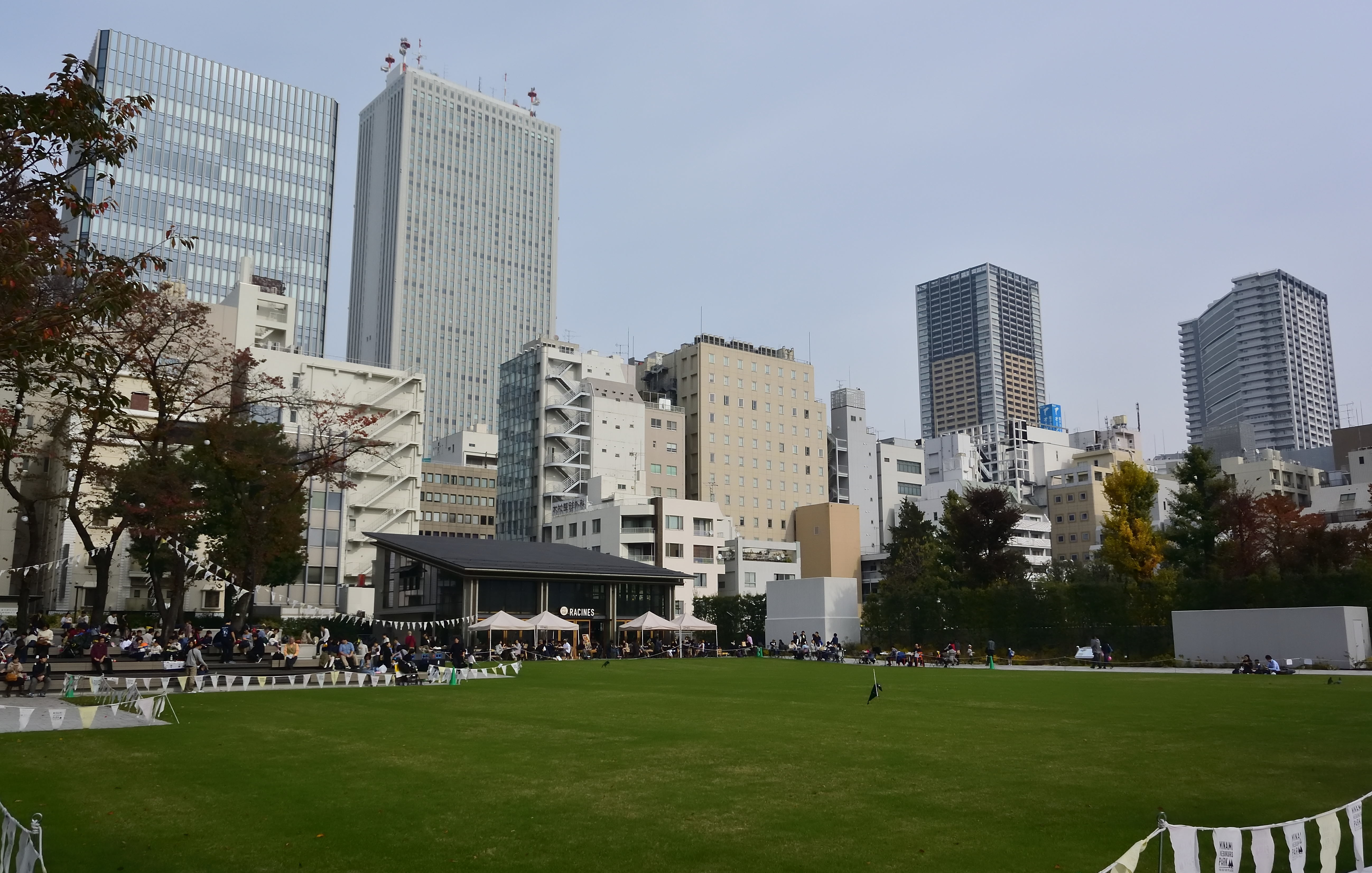
- Interactive map of Minami-Ikebukuro Park
- Location: Toshima, Tokyo, Japan
- Coordinates: 35.7280359°N 139.7128957°E
- Area: 7,811.5 square metres (1.9303 acres)
- Created: November 1948; reopened on 2 April 2016
- Public transit: Ikebukuro Station

Minami-Ikebukuro Park (南池袋公園, Minami Ikebukuro Kōen) is a public park in Toshima, Tokyo, Japan.

== History ==
The park was originally created in 1948 through a land readjustment project. From 14 September 2009 to 2014 it was closed due to the construction of an underground substation of Tokyo Electric Power Company and park maintenance construction. It was fully reopened on Saturday, April 2, 2016.

== What the park used to look like ==
In addition to the general public, there were many homeless people using the park. For the homeless people and those who attended public employment security office, soup kitchens and social welfare activities were conducted by volunteer groups and the government.

== Facilities ==
- Cafe/restaurant
- Children's play area
- Lawn
- Toilets

== Access ==
- By train: 6 minutes’ walk from Ikebukuro Station.
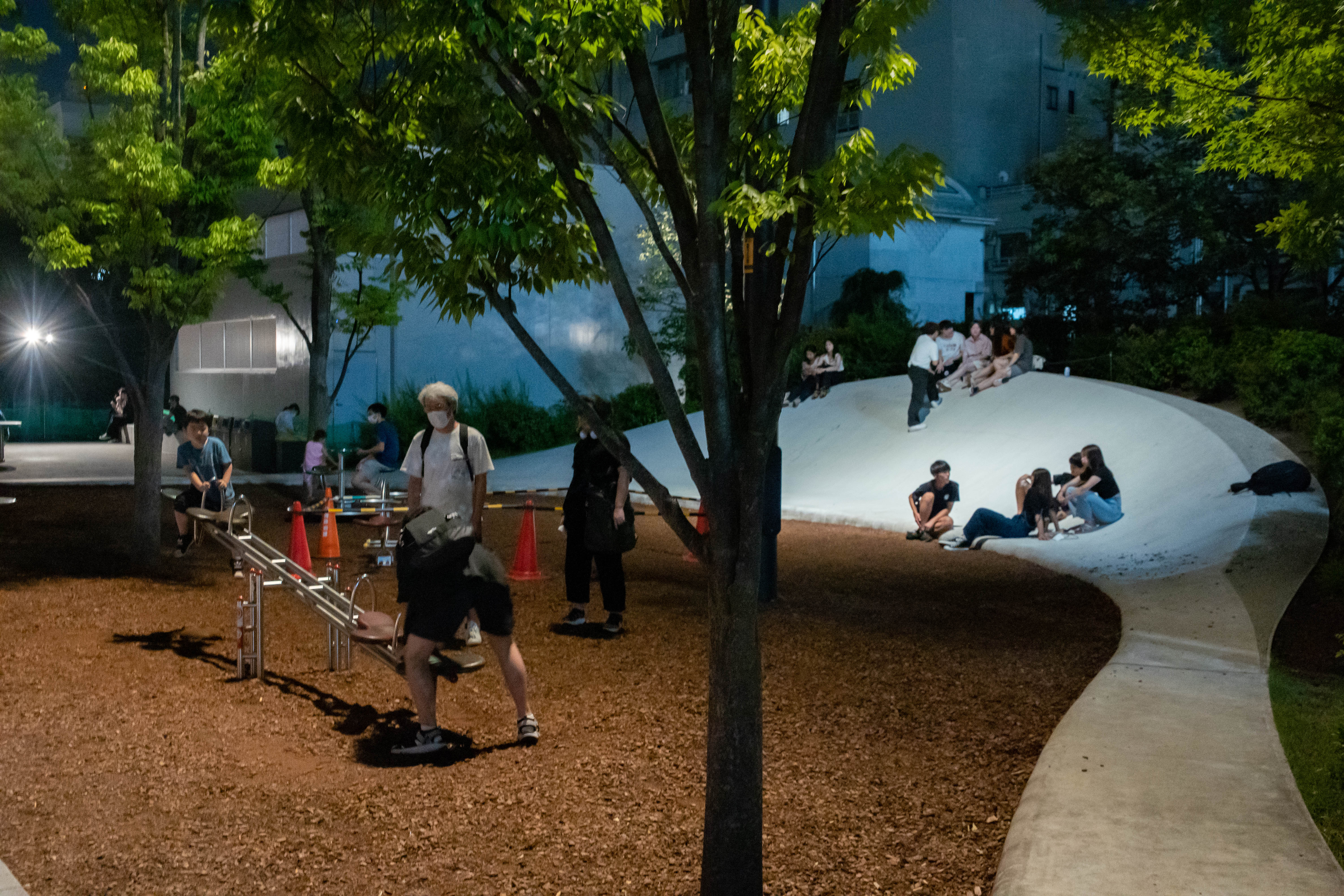
Children's play area

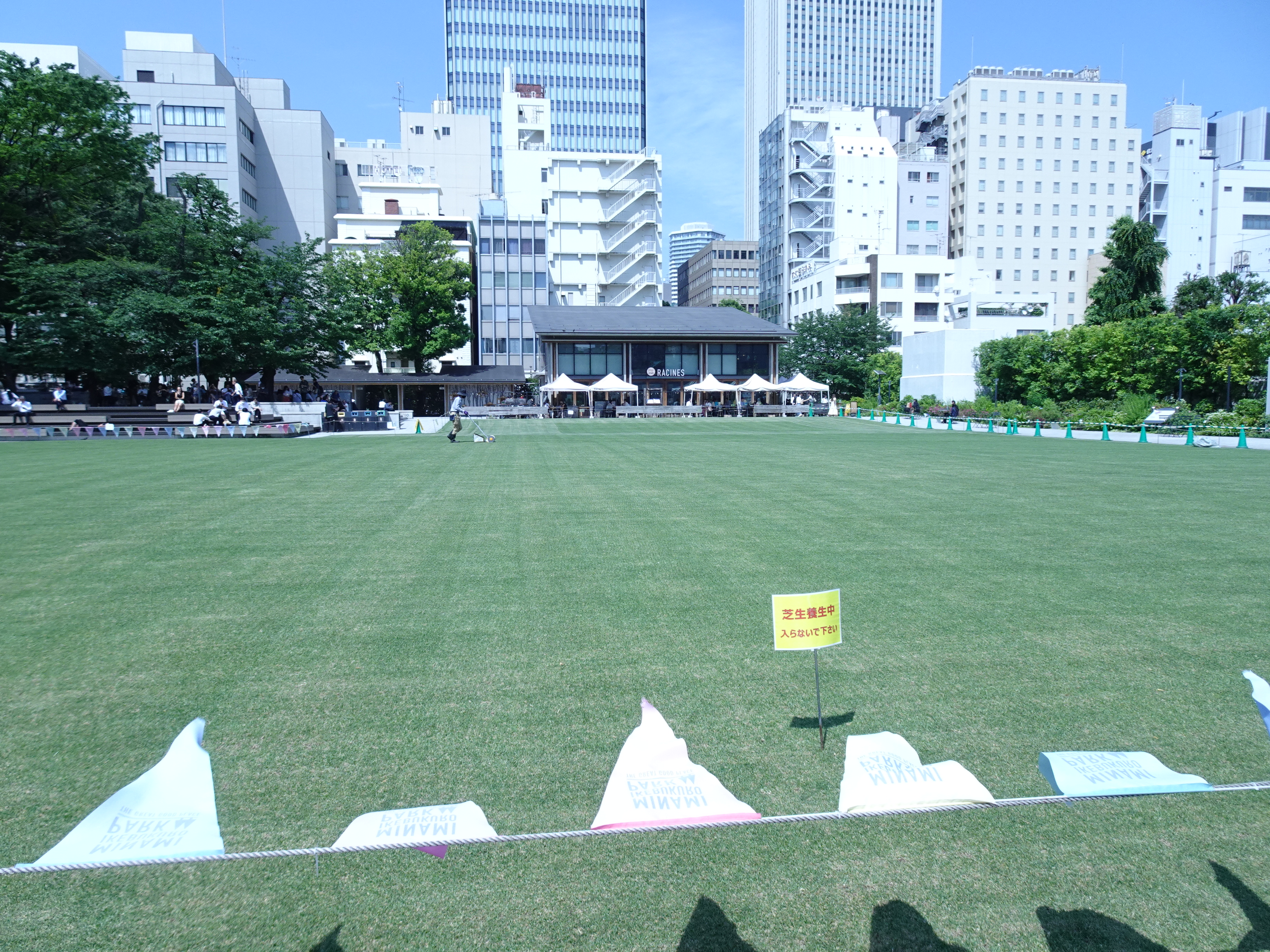
Lawn with cafe in the background

== See also ==
- Parks and gardens in Tokyo
- National Parks of Japan
