= Chihaya Flower Park =

Public park in Toshima Ward, Tokyo, Japan

Coordinates: 35.7311626°N 139.6935471°E

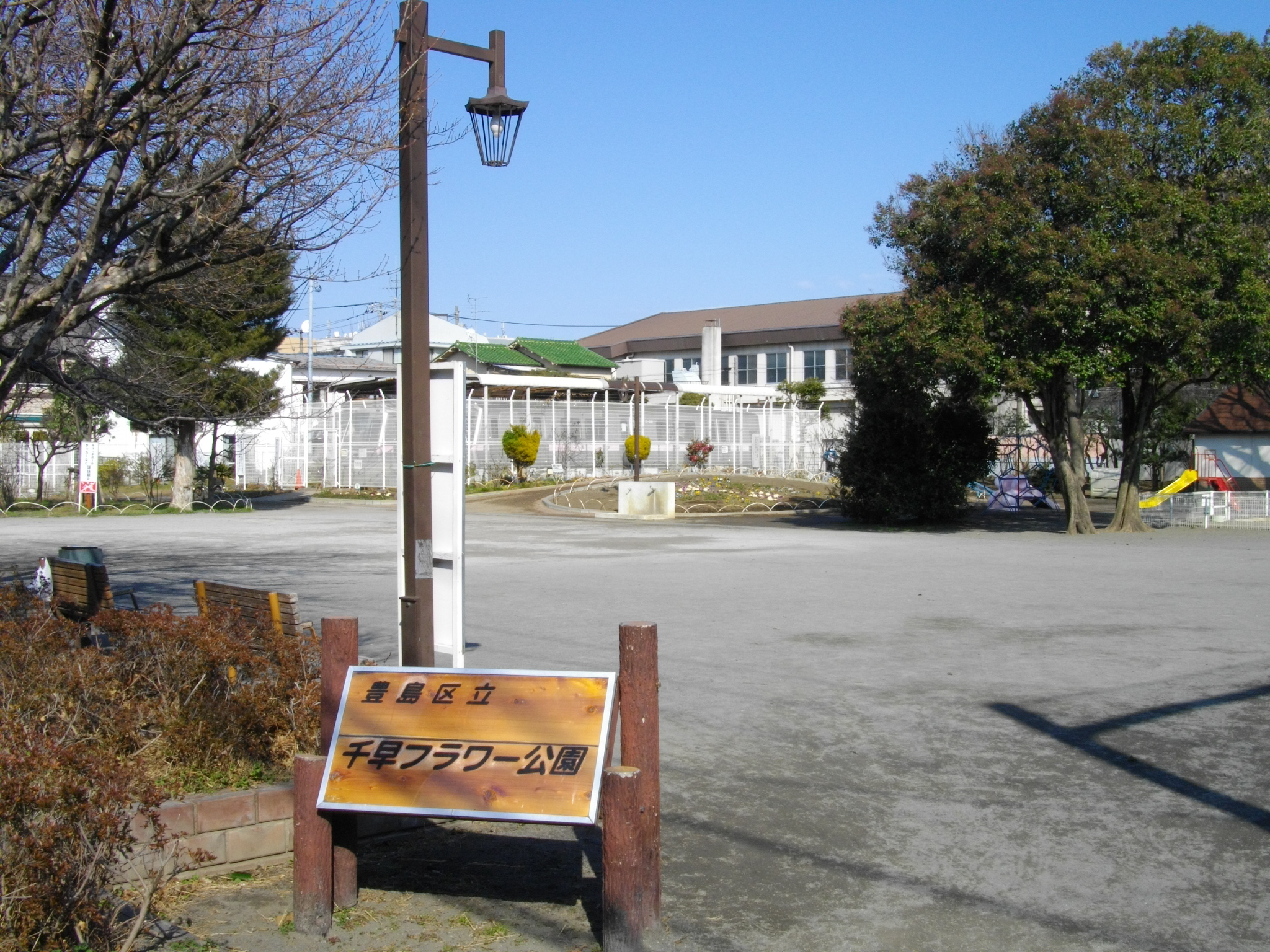
- Sign showing the park’s name
- Interactive map of Chihaya Flower Park
- Location: Toshima Ward, Tokyo, Japan
- Area: 5,542.49 square metres (1.36958 acres)
- Created: October 1990
- Public transit: Shiinamachi Station

Chihaya Flower Park (千早フラワー公園, Chihaya Furawaa Kōen) is a public park in Toshima Ward, Tokyo, Japan. It is open throughout the year. The park is the eighth largest in Toshima Ward.

== Facilities ==
Chihaya Flower Park has various pieces of play equipment for children including swings and a slide.

== Attractions ==
A prototype vehicle (12-000 series) of the Toei Ōedo Line (a subway) is located in the north side of the park.

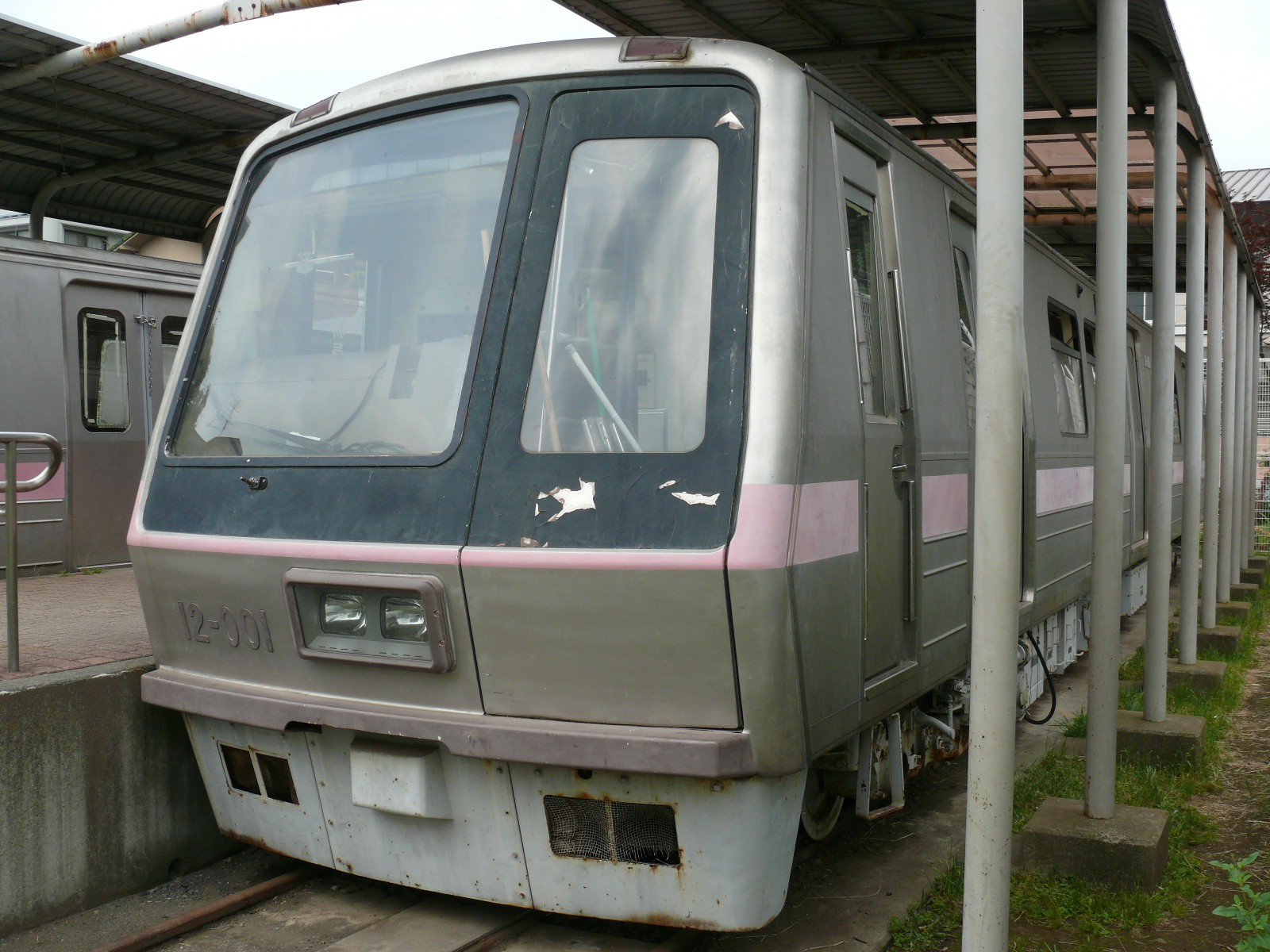
Train in the park

== See also ==
- Parks and gardens in Tokyo
- National Parks of Japan
