= Akinohi Park =

Park in Nerima, Tokyo, Japan

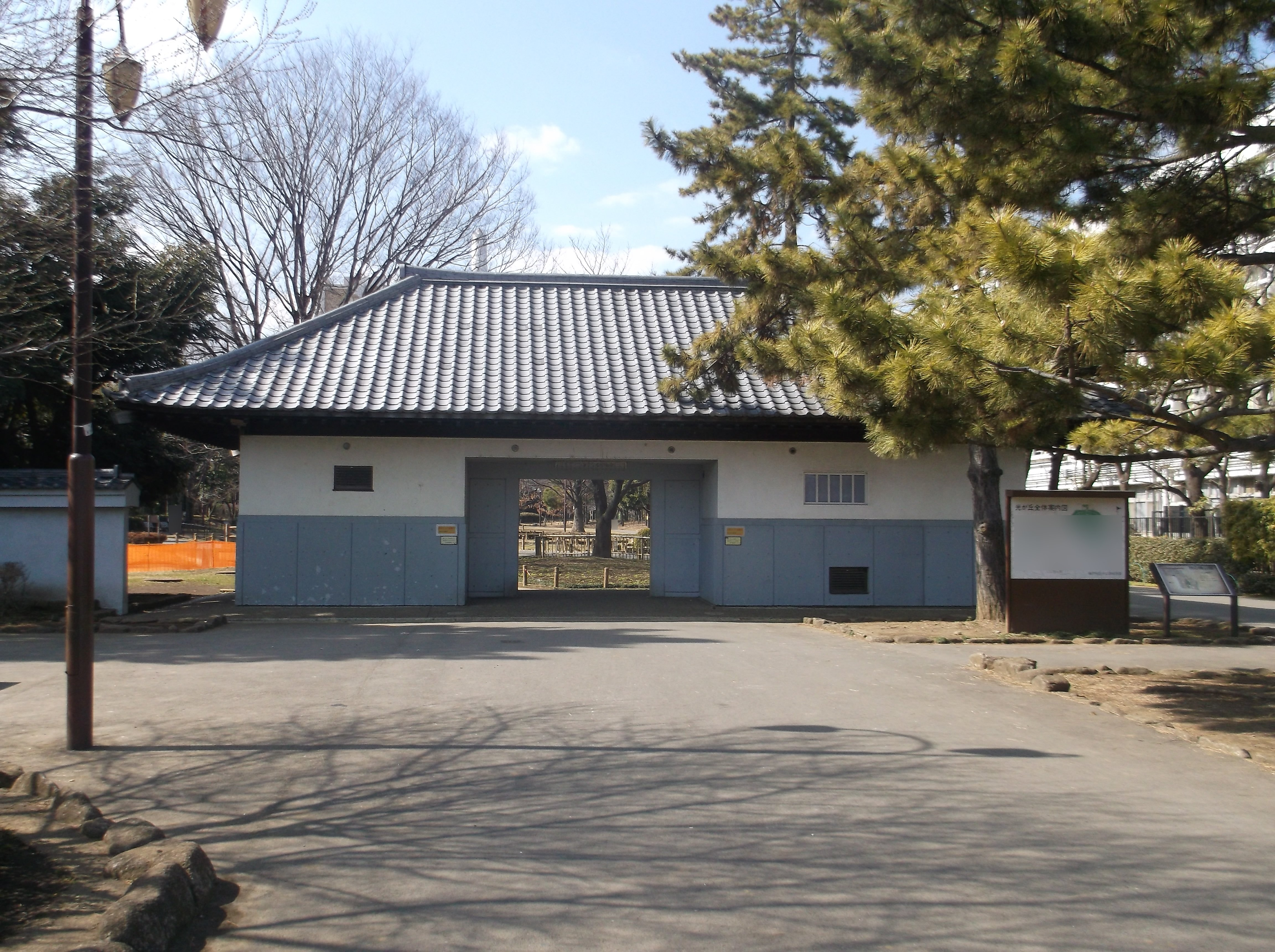
- Entrance to the park
- Interactive map of Akinohi Park
- Location: Nerima, Tokyo, Japan
- Coordinates: 35.762412°N 139.633801°E
- Area: 18,200 square metres (4.5 acres)
- Created: 1 April 1988
- Public transit: Hikarigaoka Station

Akinohi Park (秋の陽公園, Akinohi Kōen) (literally, Autumn Sun Park) is a public park in the Hikarigaoka region of Nerima, Tokyo, Japan.

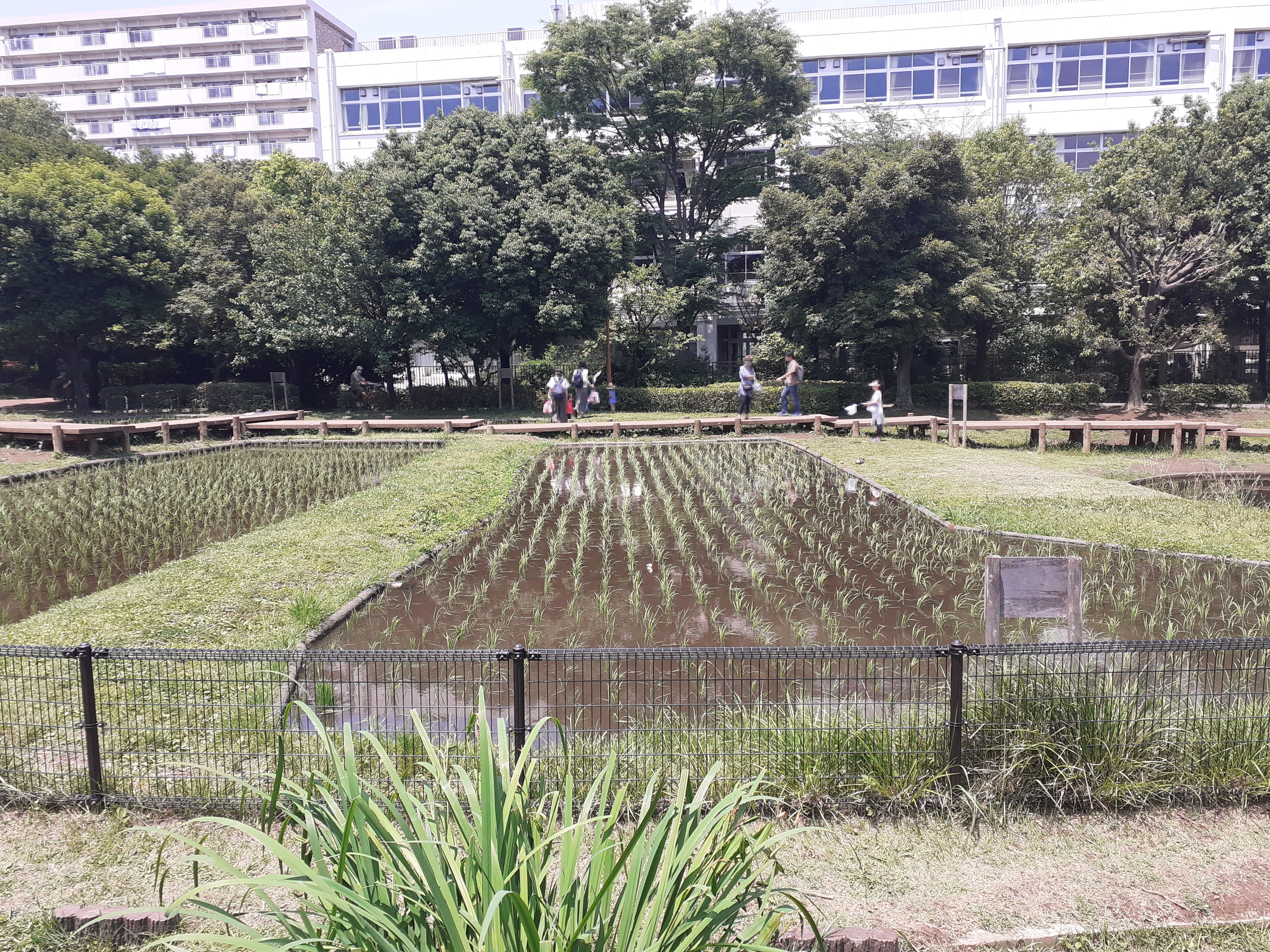
Rice paddy in the park

== Overview ==
The park is located in a corner of the Hikarigaoka housing complex, and is the only park with rice paddies in Nerima Ward. It was created to remind people that the area was once a place where paddy fields existed.

The paddy fields have an area of about 500 square metres, and glutinous rice is grown there. In order to have children experience rice cultivation, elementary school students in the neighborhood also participate in planting rice fields and harvesting rice.

At the entrance of the park, there is a gate that resembles that of an old farmhouse.

A flea market is also regularly held in the park.

== Access ==
- By train: About 15 minutes' walk from Hikarigaoka Station on the Toei Ōedo Line.

== See also ==
- Parks and gardens in Tokyo
- National Parks of Japan
