= Italy Park =

Public park in Tokyo, Japan

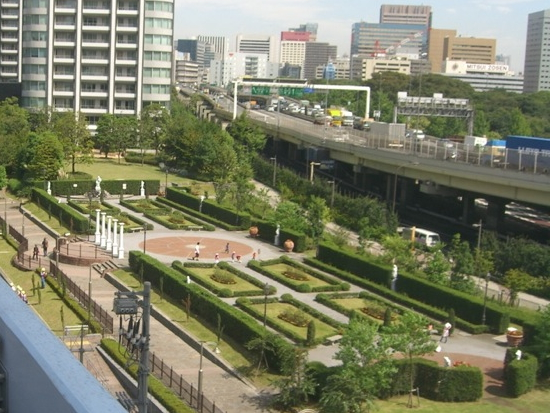
- The park in 2006
- Interactive map of Italy Park
- Location: Minato Ward, Tokyo, Japan
- Coordinates: 35.659512°N 139.759196°E
- Area: 3,660 square metres (0.90 acres)
- Created: 2003
- Public transit: Shiodome Station

Italy Park (イタリア公園, Itaria Kōen) is a public park in Minato Ward, Tokyo, Japan.

== Overview ==
The park was donated by Italy to commemorate "Italy in Japan 2001", a project that aimed to showcase Italy’s art, culture, design, fashion, music, science and technology in Japan. It is an authentic Italian garden with Italian sculptures and fountains.

== Access ==
- By train: 5 minutes’ walk from Shiodome Station on the Toei Ōedo Line

== See also ==
- Parks and gardens in Tokyo
- National Parks of Japan
