= Ōjima Komatsugawa Park =

Park in Tokyo, Japan

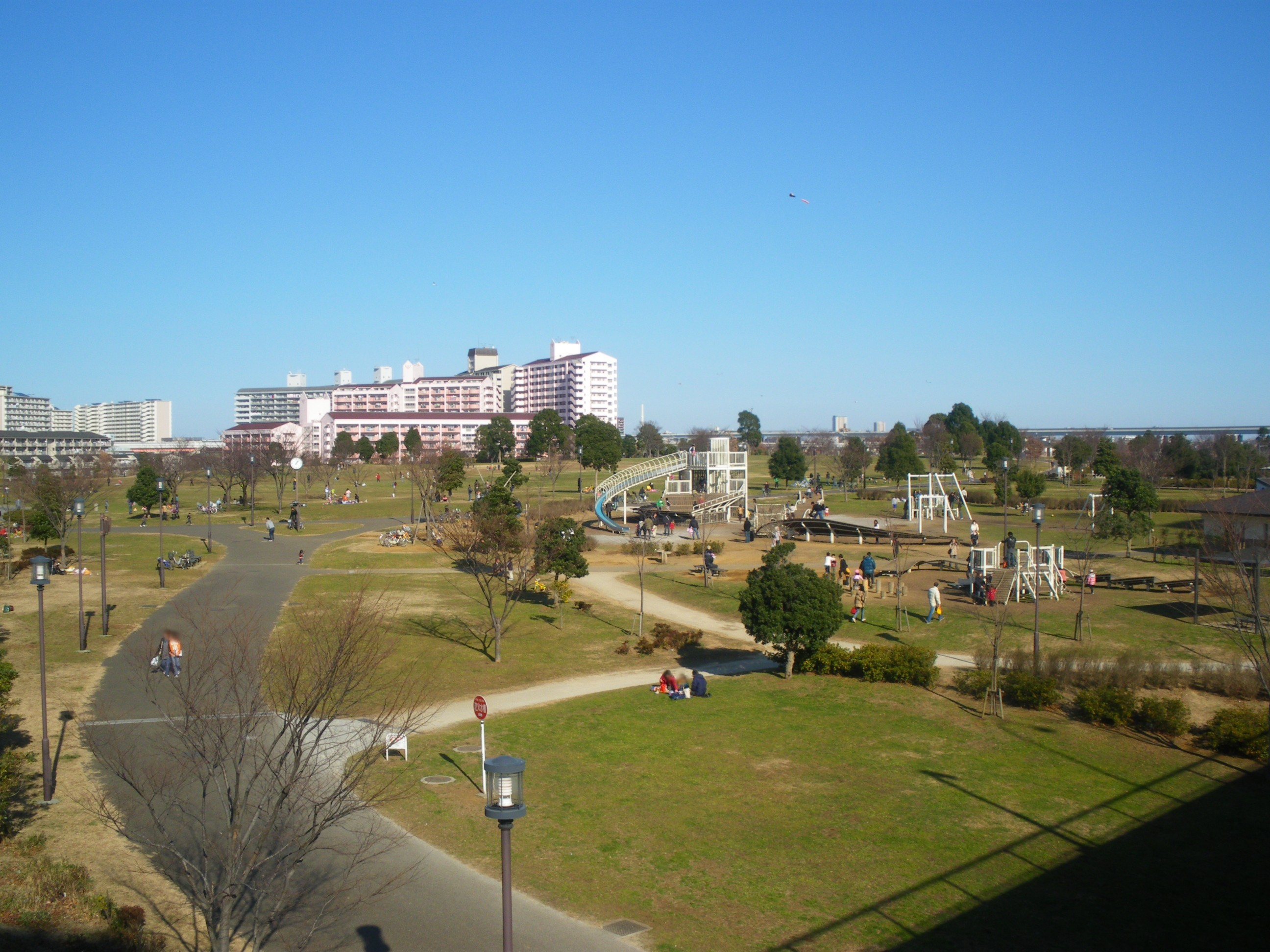
- Interactive map of Ōjima Komatsugawa Park
- Location: Edogawa Ward and Kōtō Ward, Tokyo, Japan
- Coordinates: 35.692780°N 139.849552°E
- Area: 249,282 square metres (61.599 acres)
- Created: 1 August 1997
- Public transit: Higashi-ojima Station

Ōjima Komatsugawa Park (大島小松川公園, Ōjima Komatsugawa Kōen) is a public park in Edogawa Ward and Kōtō Ward, Ojima, Tokyo, Japan.

== Overview ==
The park is mainly composed of a lawn plaza and a sports plaza, and is a place of relaxation for locals.

== History ==
The area around the park (Hirai, Ōjima, Komatsugawa) is at an altitude of 0 m above sea level, so the park was constructed by raising the land on a large scale and the park was set as an evacuation site for use in times of disaster.

== Environmental issue ==
Formerly an industrial area, it was the site where a large amount of chrome slag was buried by chemical manufacturers in the 1970s. Treatment of the slag by Kōtō Ward is said to have been completed in 2000, but a paper published in 2014 reported that some leaked during heavy rain and snowfall.

== Access ==
- By train: 3 minutes’ walk from Higashi-ojima Station on the Toei Shinjuku Line

== See also ==
- Parks and gardens in Tokyo
- National Parks of Japan
