= Musashino Central Park =

Park in Tokyo

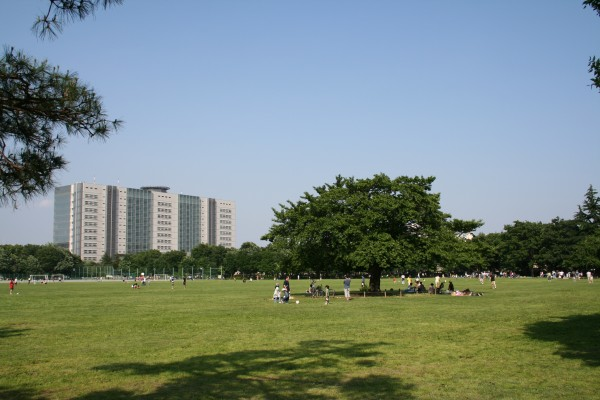
- Park in 2006
- Interactive map of Musashino Central Park
- Location: Musashino, Tokyo, Japan
- Coordinates: 35.718178°N 139.556438°E
- Area: 100,898 square metres (24.932 acres)
- Created: 1 June 1989
- Public transit: Mitaka Station

Musashino Central Park (武蔵野中央公園, Musashino Chūō Kōen) is a public park in the Yahata-cho region of the city of Musashino in Tokyo, Japan.

== Overview ==
- There are 977 trees in the park including cherry, jolcham oak, sawtooth oak, Japanese zelkova, mokryeon, and flowering dogwood. Sasanqua camellia, bigleaf hydrangea, and rhododendron also can be found there.
- Tsuki-machidai, a large, circular, stone bench representing the moon
- Kaze-o-miru-oka, a hill upon which to feel the breeze
- Children’s playground area
- Tennis courts (4, artificial grass)
- Gateball field
- Barbecue square

== Access ==
- By train: 25 minutes’ walk from Mitaka Station on the Chūō Line (Rapid)

== See also ==
- Parks and gardens in Tokyo
- National Parks of Japan
