= Takaido Park =

Public park in Tokyo, Japan

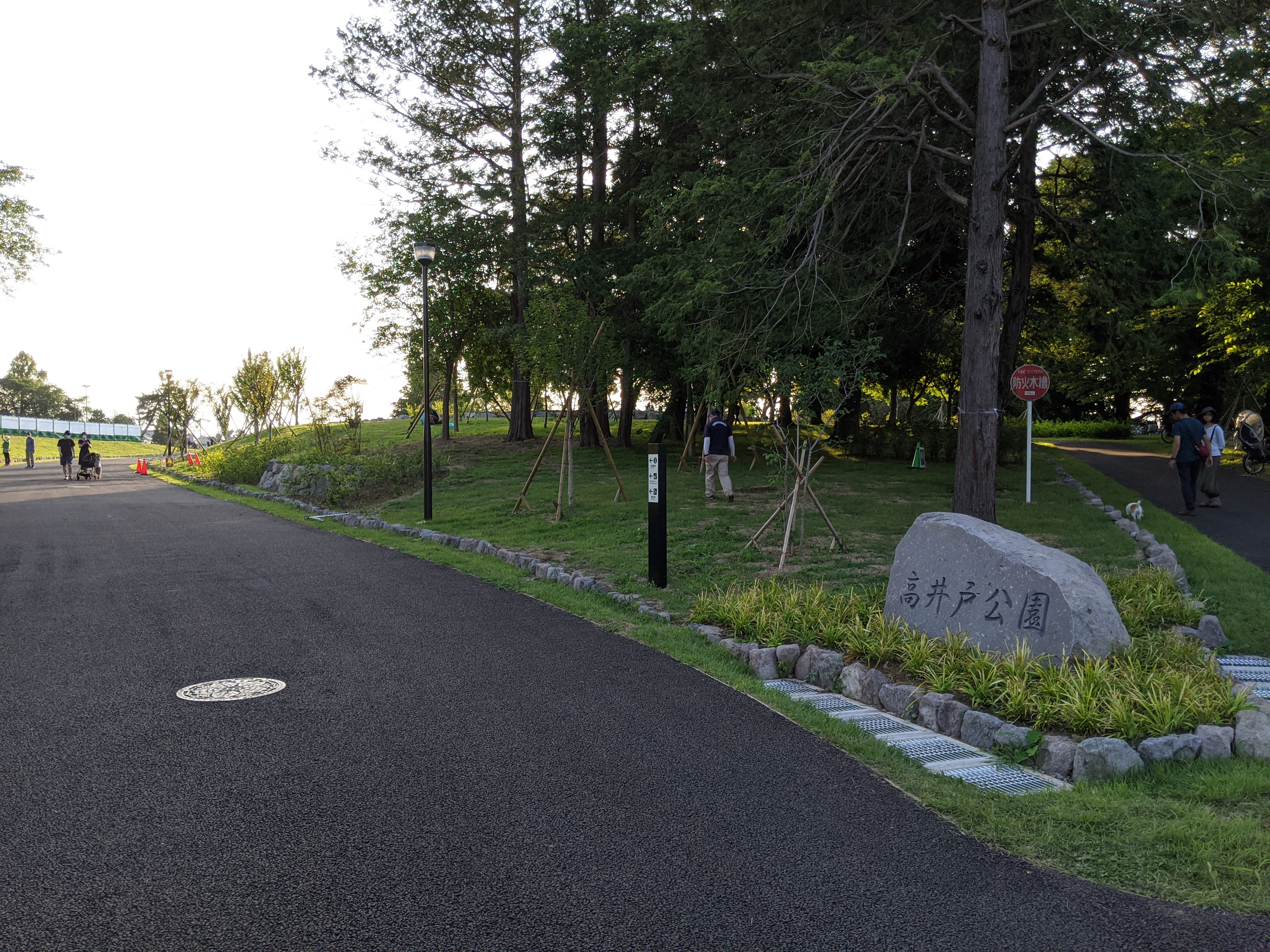
- View from Fujimigaoka Exit
- Interactive map of Takaido Park
- Location: Suginami, Tokyo, Japan
- Coordinates: 35°41′2.7″N 139°36′12.28″E
- Area: 95,000 square metres (23 acres)
- Opened: 1 June 2020
- Facilities: Grass field, children's park
- Website: www.tokyo-park.or.jp/park/takaido/

Takaido Park (高井戸公園, Takaido Kōen) is a public park in the Suginami ward of Tokyo in Japan.

== Overview ==
It was decided to be a sports park in 1957. Most of the planned site was occupied by three facilities: Oji Paper Fujimigaoka Ground, National Printing Bureau Kugayama Sports Ground, and NHK Fujimigaoka Sports Ground. However, as no work had been started for many years, a residential area had formed in the southwest. The need for a disaster prevention park was highlighted in the wake of the Great East Japan Earthquake in 2011, and the area was designated as a priority development area, with a development plan submitted in 2013. In the city plan, most of the Keio Electric Railway Fujimigaoka Depot, located on the north side of the Kanda River, was also included in the planned area of the park, but for the time being, only the south side of the river was planned to be developed, with the north side planned to be a lawn zone and the south side a sports zone. Takaido Interchange is nearby.

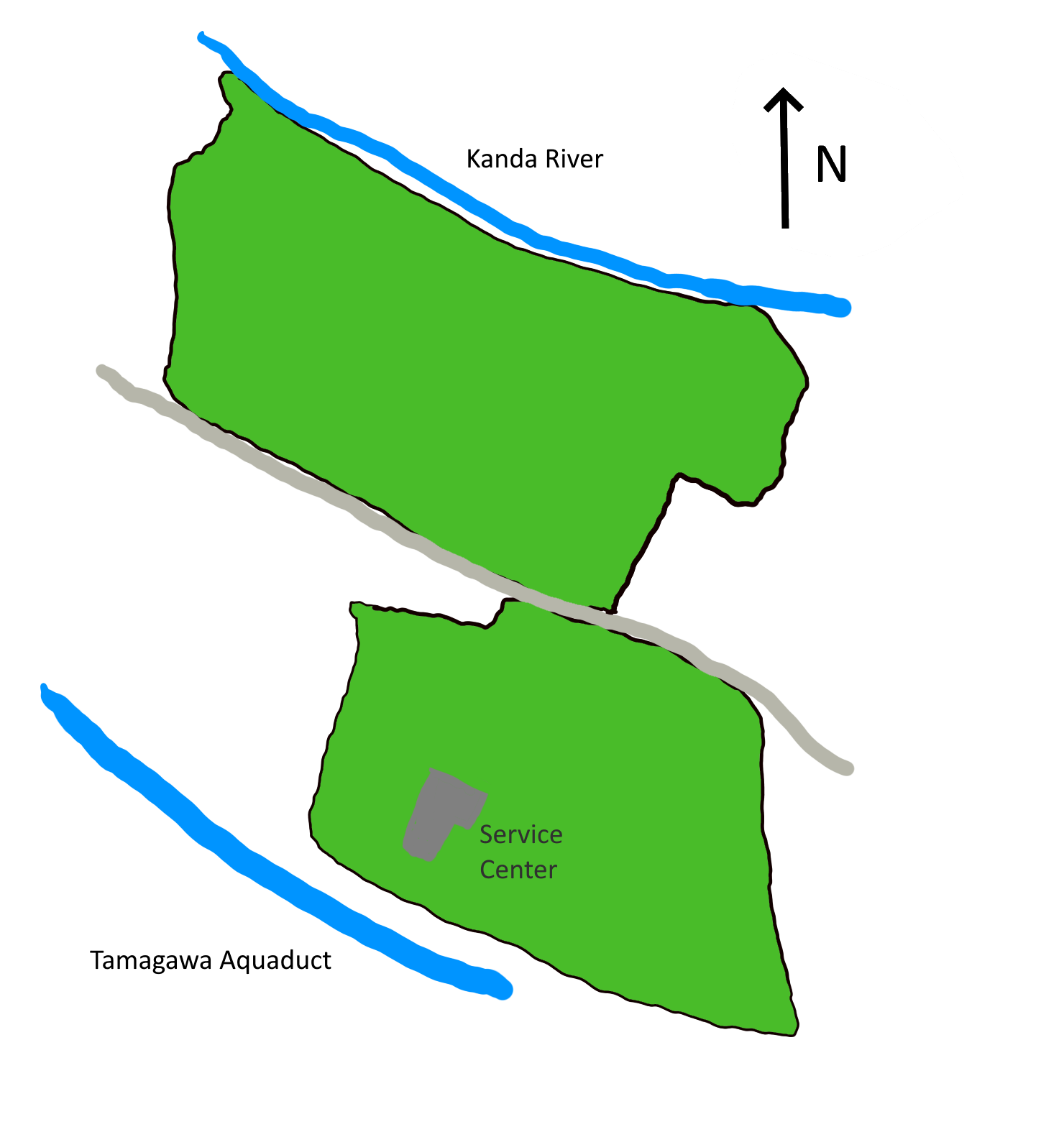
Bird's eye view of the park

== History ==
- 1942 - Designated as an air defense green space.
- 21 December 1957 - City planning decided (17.4 ha).
- 2015 - Construction begins.
- 1 June 2020 - The park on the east side of the north district (24,667 m^{2}) opens.
- 1 June 2021 - The west side of the North District (34,654 m^{2}) opens.
- 1 August 2022 - The east side of the South District (22,345 m^{2}) opens.
- 1 August 2023 - Suginami Ward Fujimigaoka Multipurpose Square, which also serves as an elementary school playground, opens in the southeast corner of the North District adjacent to Suginami Ward Fujimigaoka Elementary School.
- 1 September 2023 - Additional park space opens in the South District (11,702 m^{2}) and the ball field (soccer/rugby field) begins use.
- 7 November 2023 - Additional park space opens in the South District (1,957 m^{2}). The service center was relocated to the South District.

== Gallery ==
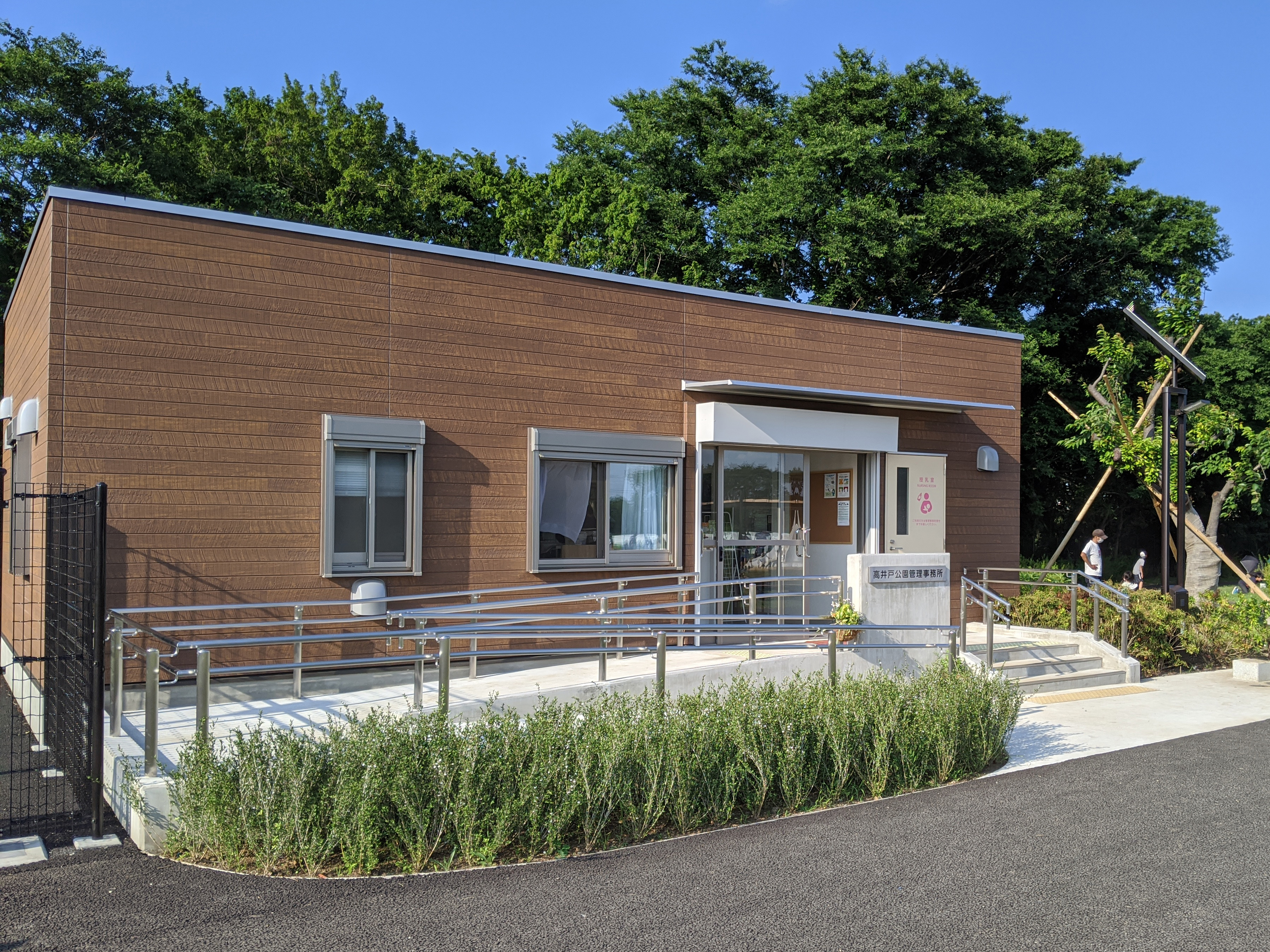
Service Center

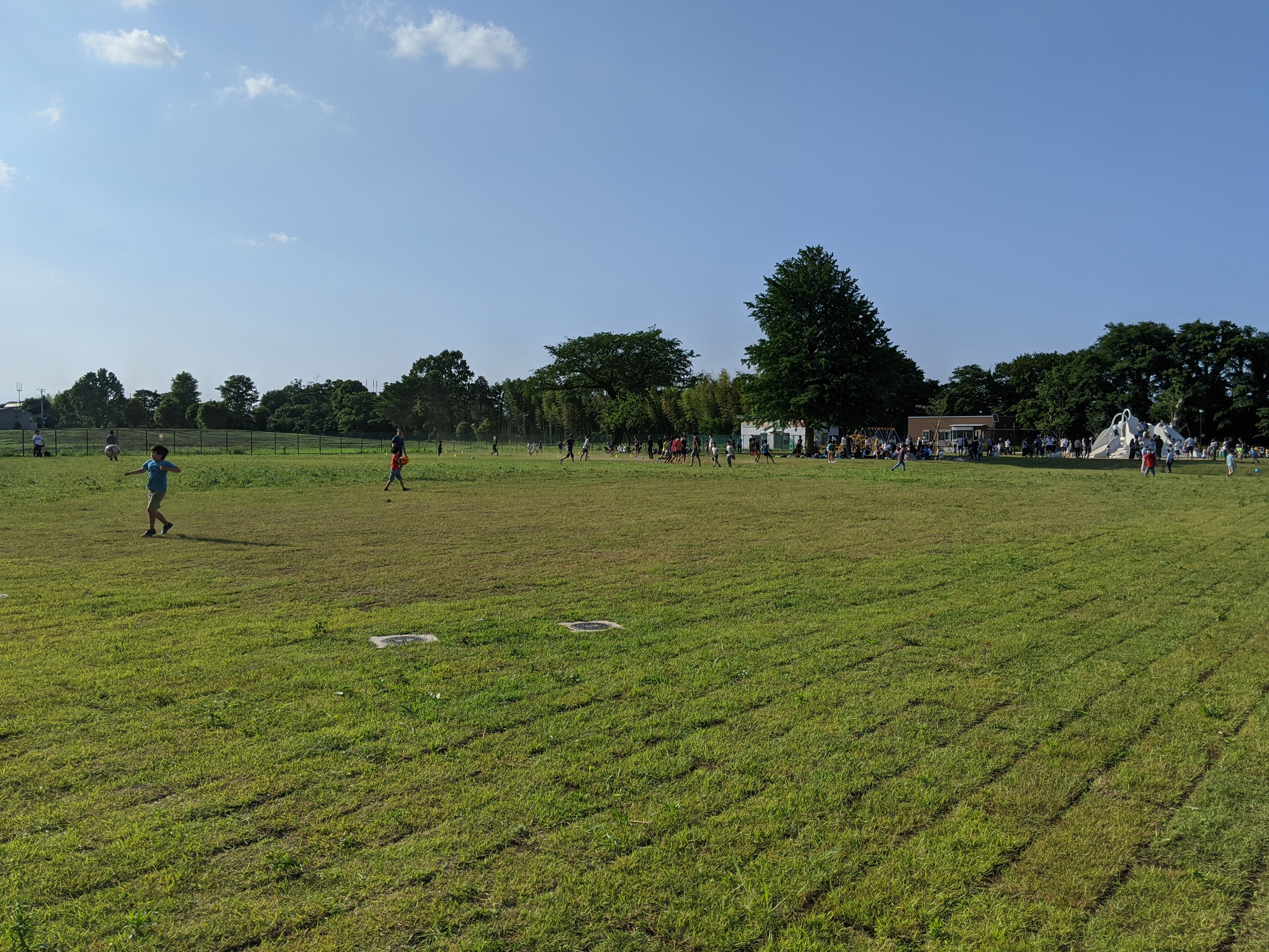
Lawn area
