= Fuchū-no-Mori Park =

Public park in Fuchū, Japan

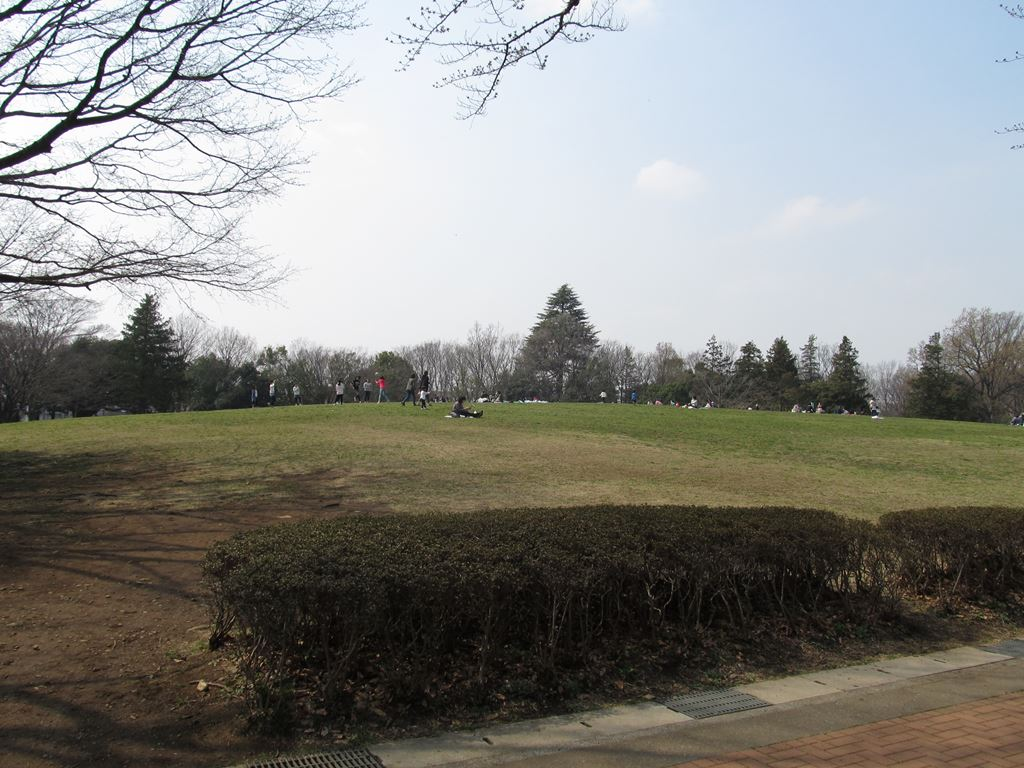
- Grassy area
- Interactive map of Fuchū-no-Mori Park
- Location: Fuchū, Tokyo, Japan
- Coordinates: 35.6765926°N 139.4895409°E
- Area: 169,748.60 square metres (41.94579 acres)
- Created: 1 June 1991
- Public transit: Higashi-fuchū Station

Fuchū-no-Mori Park (府中の森公園, Fuchū no Mori Kōen) is a public park in the Sengen-cho region of the city of Fuchū in Tokyo. It is located a little east of the center of the city, close to Higashi-fuchū Station.

== Facilities ==
- Flower promenade running north and south in the center of the park
- Monument
- Observation open space
- Musashino Forest on the west side
- Large open space (lawn)
- Sports facilities (tennis courts, small baseball field, soccer/hockey field)
- Barbecue open space

== Access ==
- By train: About 10 minutes’ walk from Higashi-fuchū Station on the Keiō Line.

== See also ==
- Parks and gardens in Tokyo
- National Parks of Japan
