= Minami-Nagasaki Sports Park =

Public park in Tokyo, Japan

Coordinates: 35.725083°N 139.683500°E

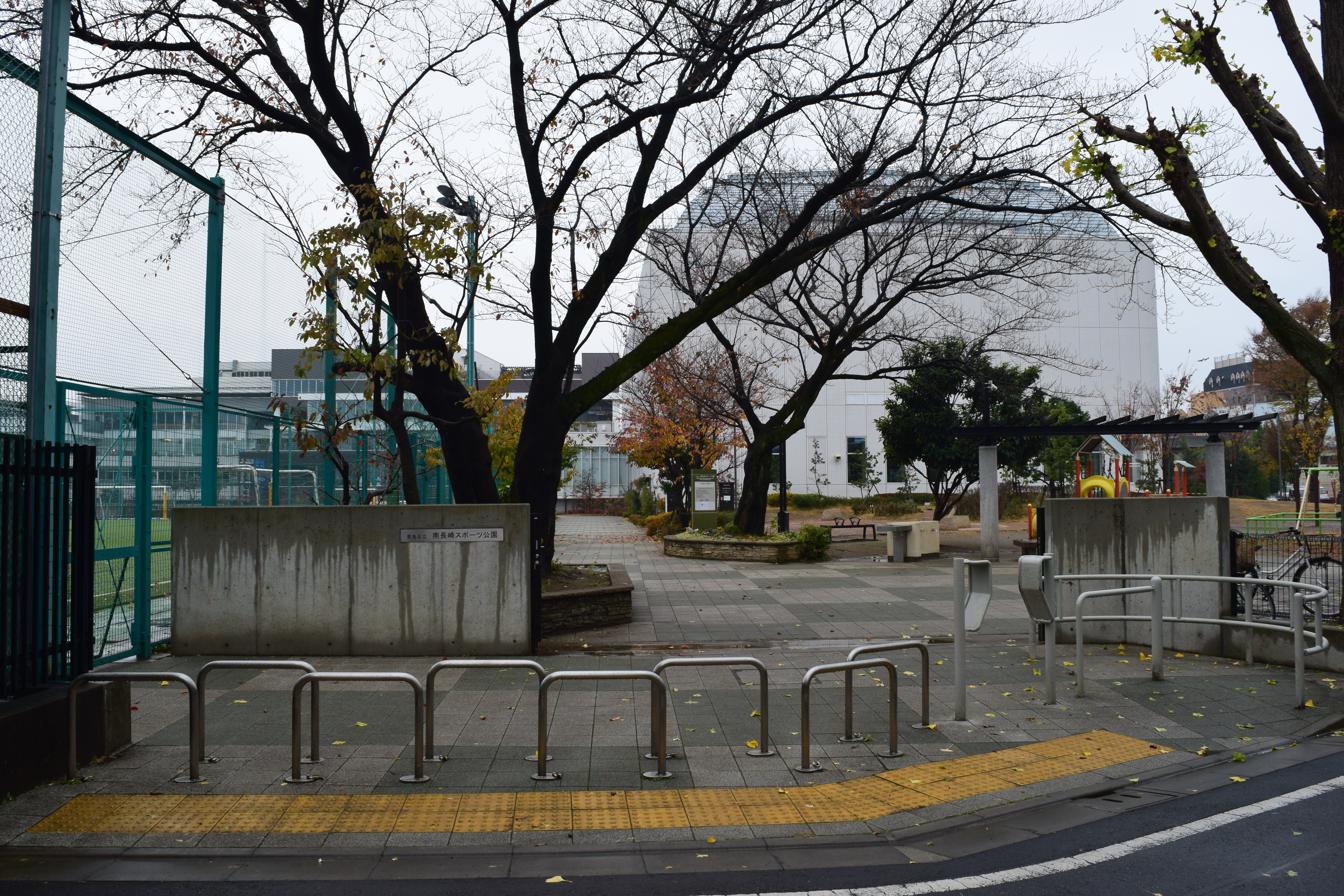
- Eastern entrance to the park
- Interactive map of Minami-Nagasaki Sports Park
- Location: Toshima Ward, Tokyo, Japan
- Coordinates: 35.725083,139.683500
- Area: 12,226 square metres (3.021 acres)
- Created: July 2013
- Public transit: Ochiai-minami-nagasaki Station

Minami-Nagasaki Sports Park (南長崎スポーツ公園, Minami-Nagasaki Supo-tsu Kōen) is a public park in Toshima Ward, Tokyo, Japan. It is the largest public park in Toshima Ward. The total park area includes the area of the Minami-Nagasaki Sports Center building and the football pitch. The area of the grassy section of the park excluding the football pitch is about 3,204 m^{2}.

== History ==
Minami-Nagasaki Sports Park is an urban planning park that was built on the site of the former Nagasaki Junior High School (豊島区立長崎中学校), which was completed in May 1950. The school closed in 2006 due to a fall in the number of students. Based on answers to an Internet questionnaire, the park was made a sports and disaster-prevention location. The park contains a memorial plaque to Nagasaki Junior High School.

== Facilities ==
There is a sports center, football (soccer) pitch (multipurpose square), open space with a lawn, and in summer there is a small fountain and water area (called Jabu-Jabu Ike (Splashing Pond)). There is play equipment for children including swings and slides. As a disaster-prevention facility, the park has a water-sampling port, a manhole that can serve as a temporary toilet, and a bench that can be used as a small oven. The park also offers access to existing disaster-prevention wells and fire-prevention water tanks.

== Gallery ==
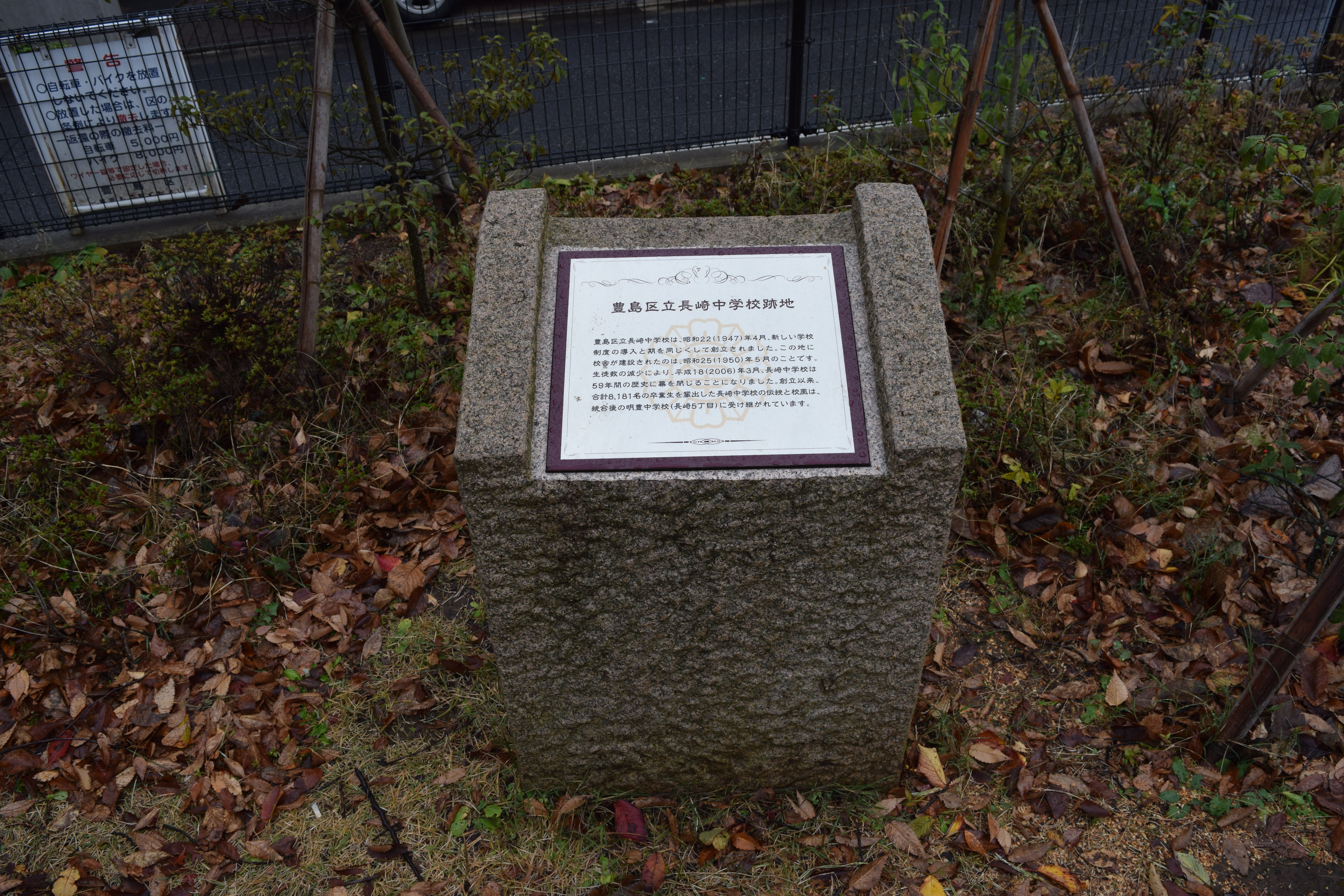
Memorial to the old school that used to occupy the site

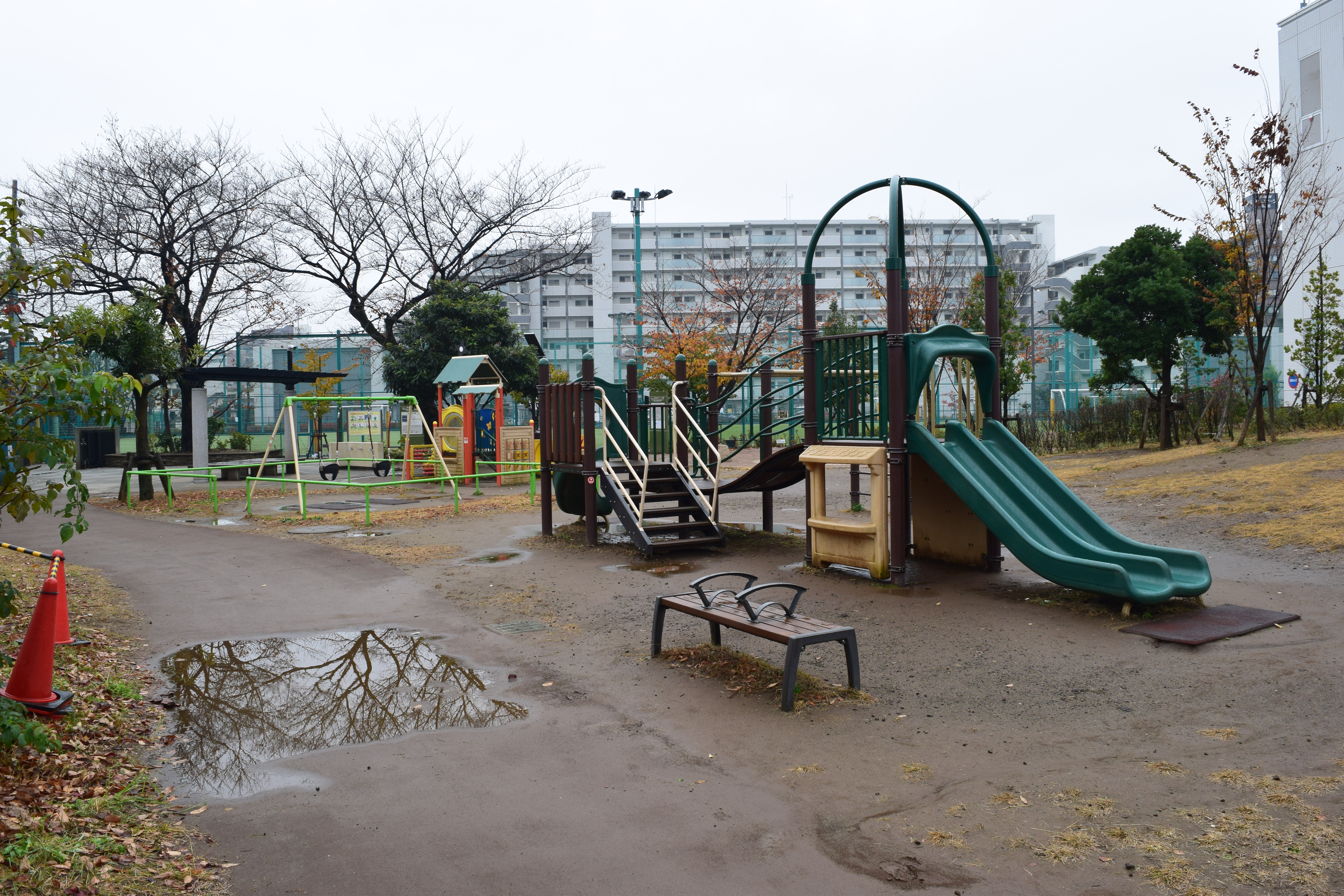
Play equipment in the park

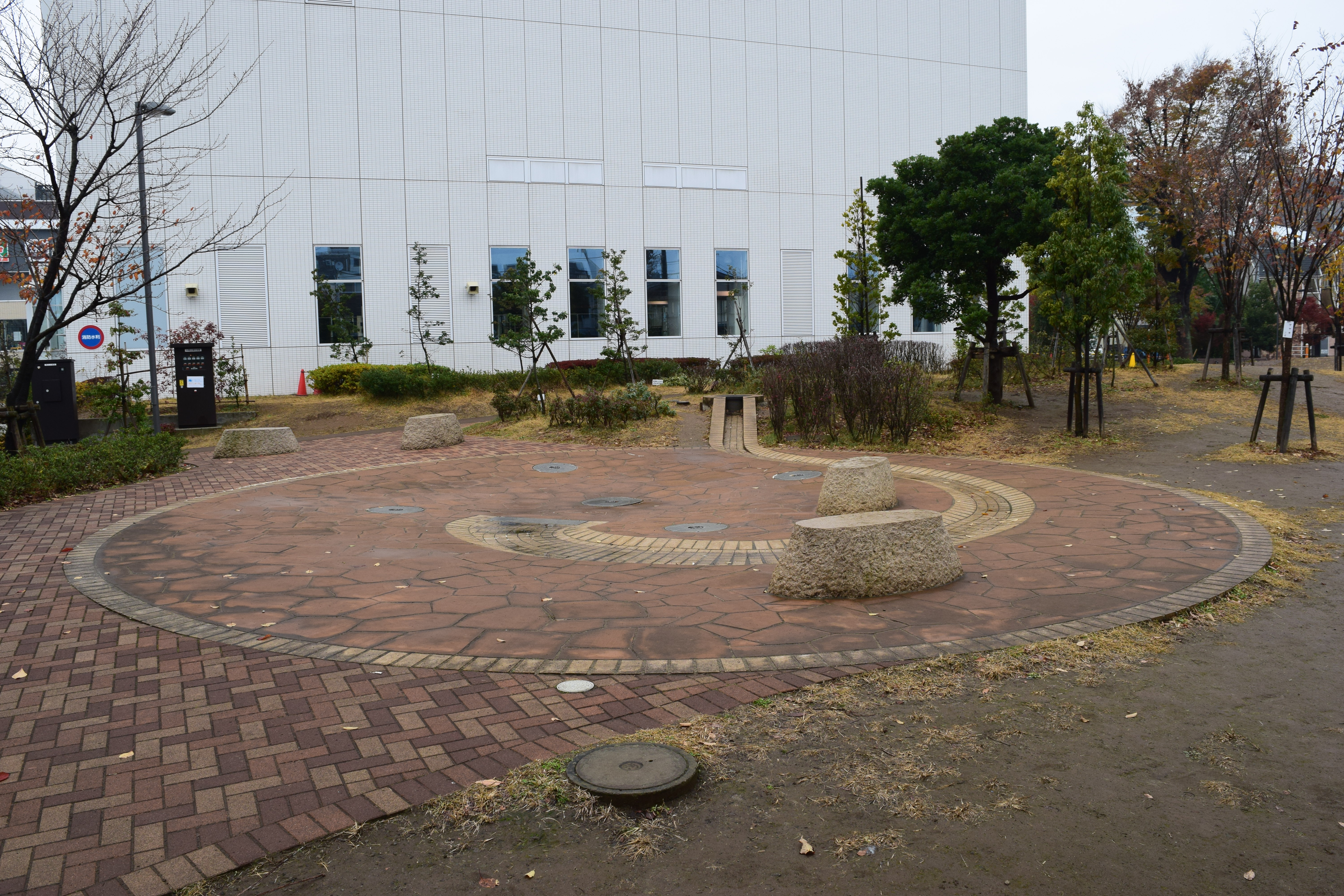
Fountain and water area in the park (summer only)

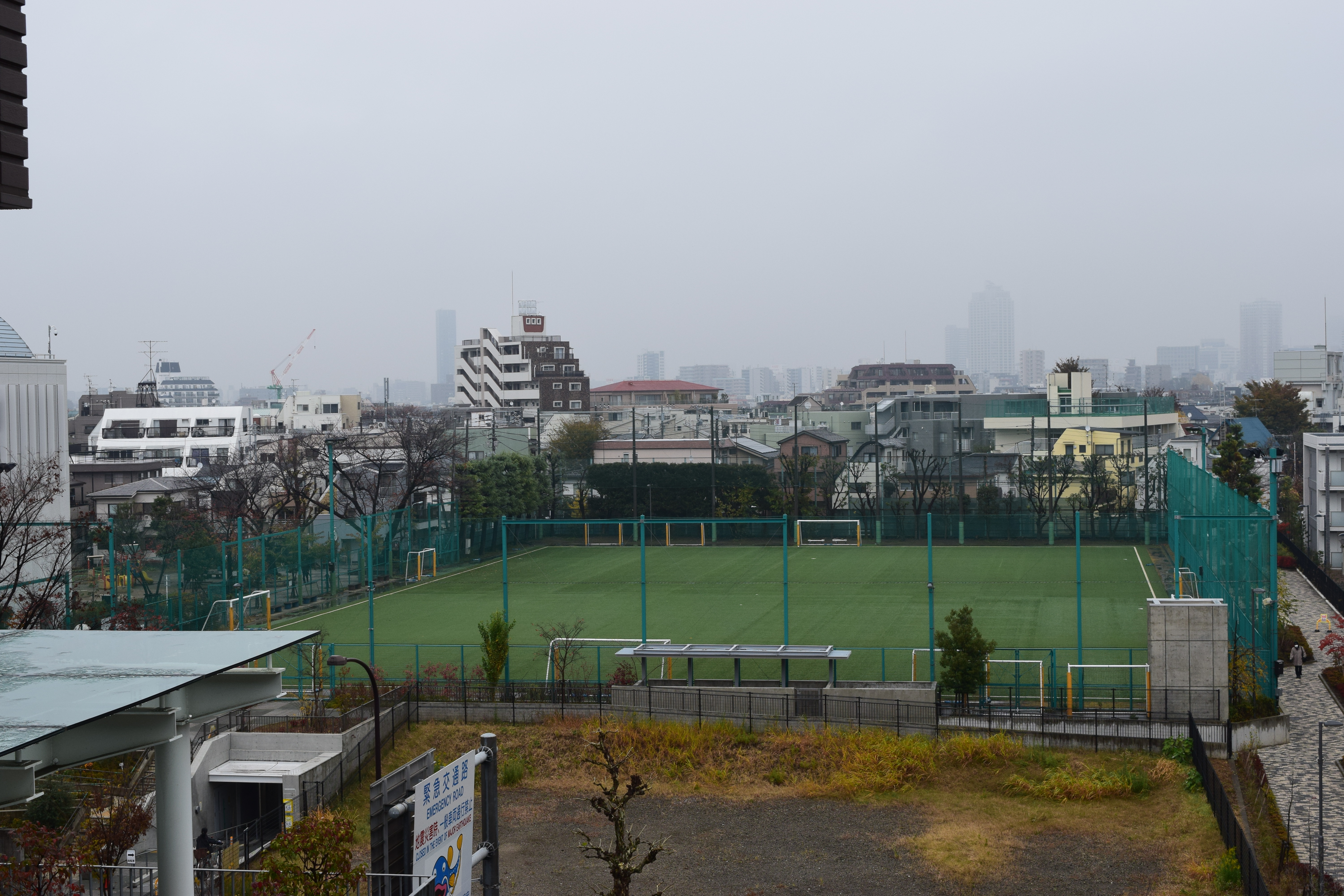
Football pitch that makes up part of the park

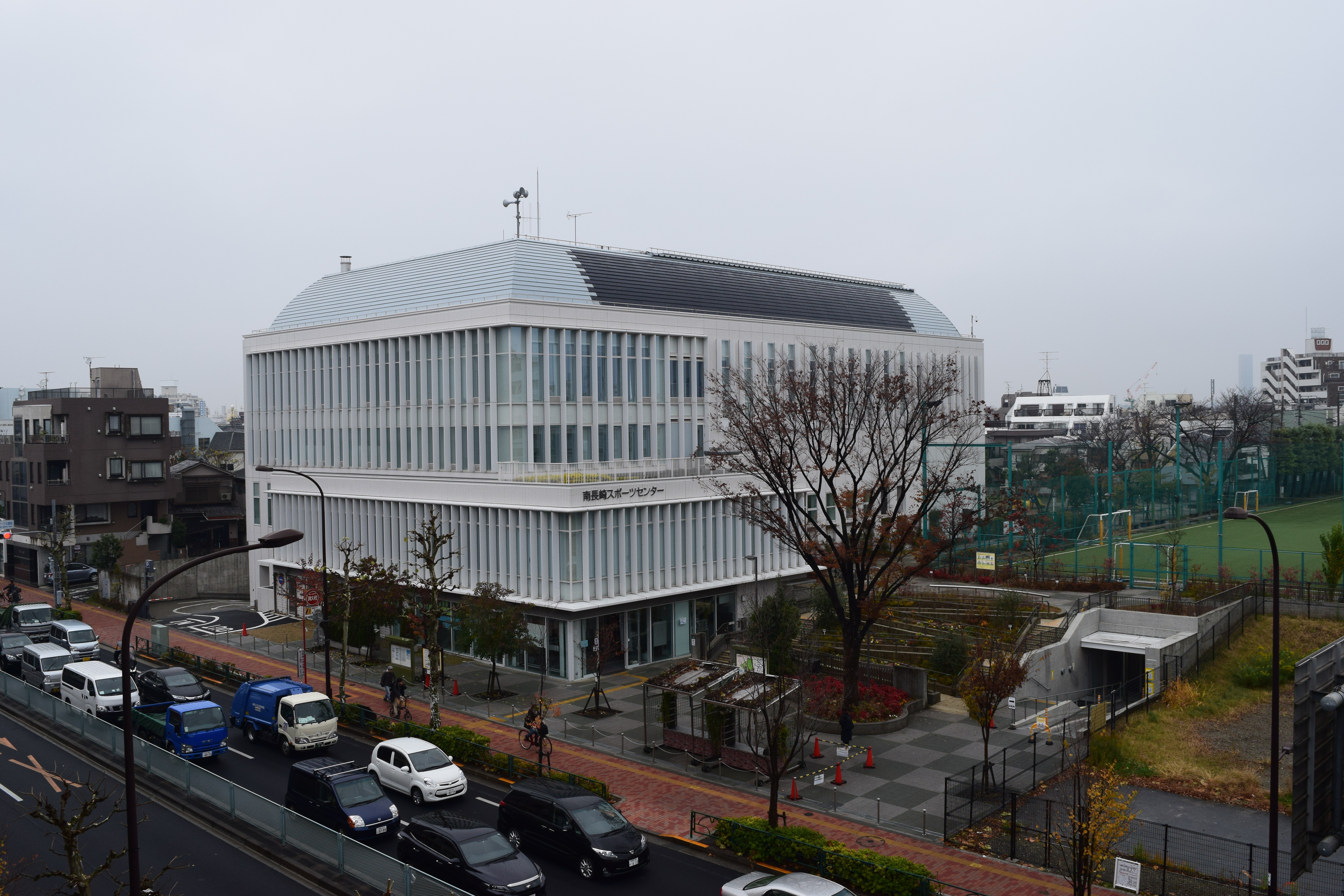
Minami-Nagasaki Sports Center, which forms part of the park

== See also ==
- Parks and gardens in Tokyo
- National Parks of Japan
