= Sekimachi-Higashi =

Sekimachi-Higashi 関町東
- Neighborhood (町丁)
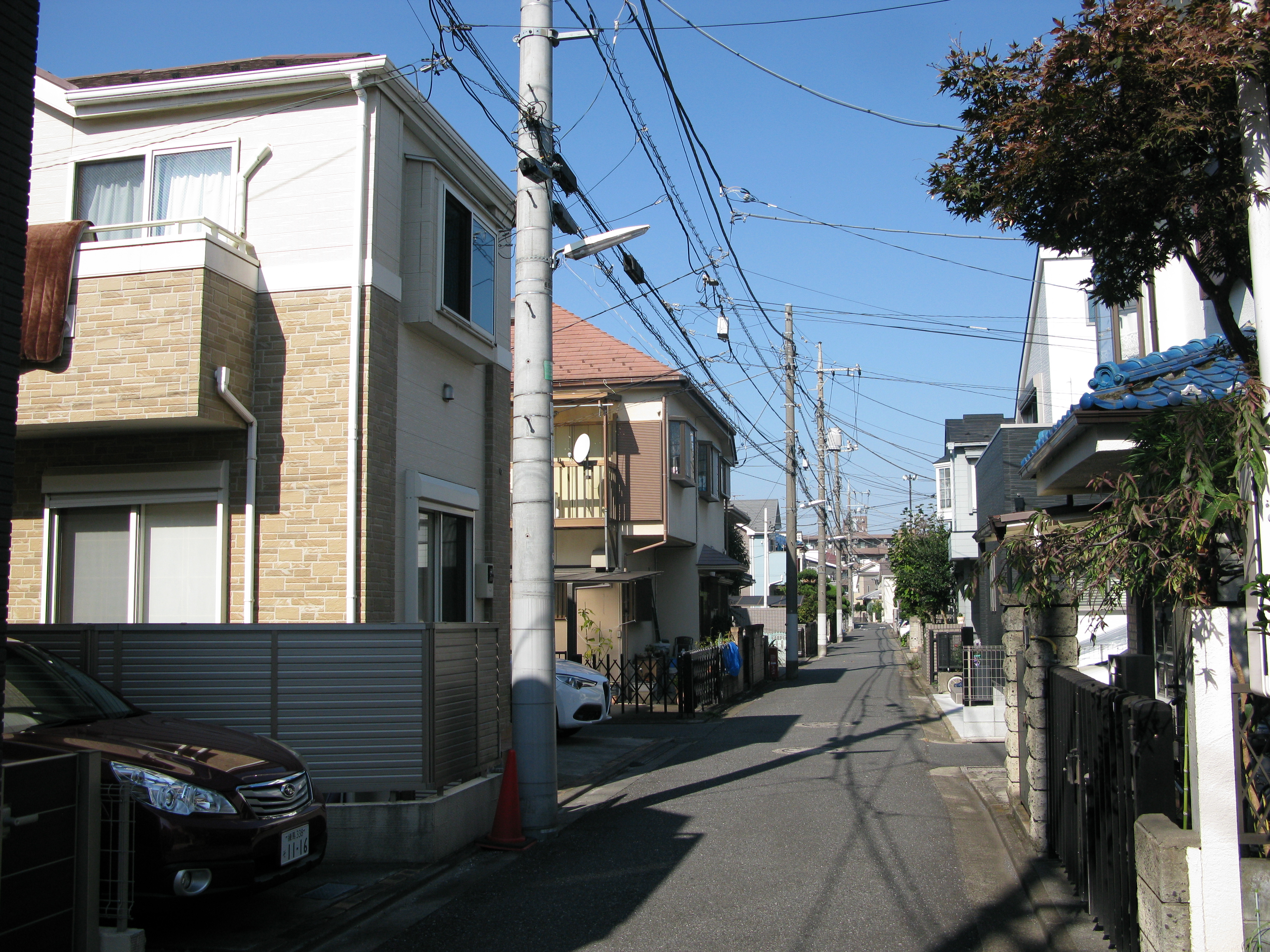
- Sekimachi-Higashi 1st Street

- Location of Sekimachi-Minami within the Wards Area of Tokyo
- Coordinates: 35°43′34″N 139°34′57″E
- Country: Japan
- Metropolis: Tokyo
- Ward: Nerima

Area
  - Total: 1.048 km^{2} (0.405 sq mi)

Population (December 1, 2017)
  - Total: 5,359
- Time zone: UTC+9 (JST)
- Zip code: 177-0052
- Area code: 03

Sekimachi-Higashi (関町東) is a neighborhood of Nerima Ward in Tokyo, Japan. The residential address system has been implemented since June 1, 1985, and the current administrative names go from Sekmachi-Higashi 1st Street to 2nd Street (丁目, chōme).

== Geography ==
The neighborhood is located in the western part of Nerima Ward. It borders the neighborhoods Kami-Shakujii to the east, Sekimachi-Minami across the Ōme-kaidō Avenue to the south, Sekimachi-Kita to the west, and Shakujiidai across the Shakujii River to the north. It is primarily a residential area.
