= Tatenochō (Nerima Ward) =

Tatenochō 立野町
- Neighborhood (町丁)
- "Tōka-gen" Chinese Garden in Tateno Park

- Location of Tatenochō within the Wards Area of Tokyo
- Country: Japan
- Region: Kantō
- Metropolis: Tokyo
- Ward: Nerima

Area
  - Total: 0.357 km^{2} (0.138 sq mi)

Population (April 1, 2025)
  - Total: 5,556
- Time zone: UTC+9 (JST)
- Zip code: 177-0054
- Area code: 03

Tatenochō (立野町) is a neighborhood of Nerima Ward in Tokyo, Japan. It has no sub-numbered streets (丁目, chōme). The residential address system has been fully implemented in this area since 1 June 1984.

== Geography ==
Tatenochō is located in the southernmost part of Nerima Ward. It borders Sekimachi-Minami (Nerima Ward) and a portion of Zenpukuji (Suginami Ward) to the north and east, and Kichijōji-Higashichō and Kichijōji-Kitamachi in the city of Musashino to the south and west. While shops can be seen along Kichijōji-dōri Avenue, it is primarily a residential area.

=== Rivers ===
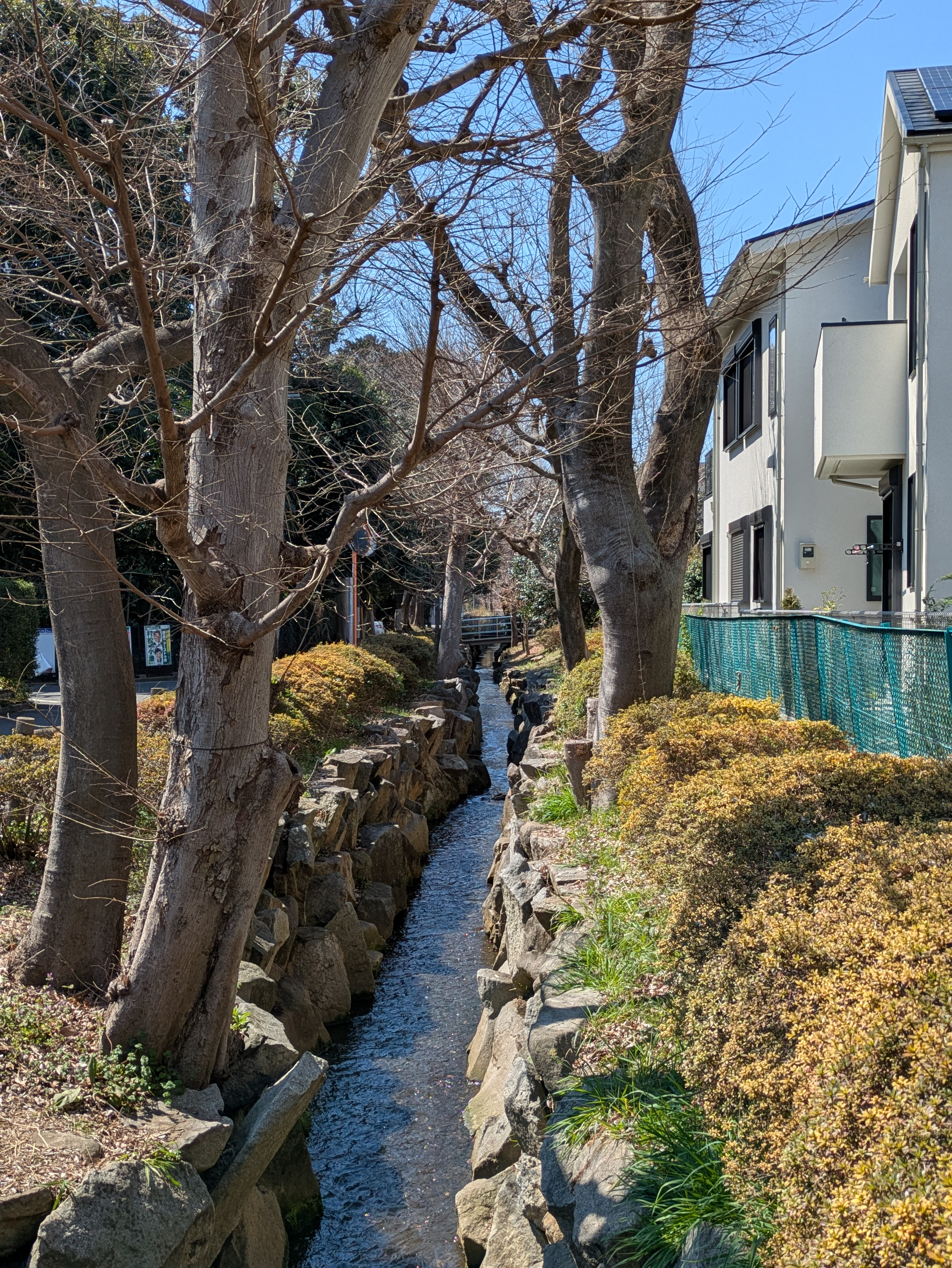
Senkawa Aqueduct in Tatenochō

Senkawa Aqueduct runs east-to-west through the northern section of the district, though its path does not strictly coincide with district boundaries.

== History ==
=== Origin of the Name ===
The name comes from Tateno (originally pronounced Tachino), an administrative sub-unit (字, aza) located in the southwestern section of Kami-Shakujii Village in Musashi Province. The main village was situated around the present-day 1st and 4th Street of Kami-Shakujii, Nerima Ward, and an exclave of reclaimed land further away also came to be called Tateno. Present-day Tatenochō corresponds to that original exclave. The intersection named Tatenobashi on Senkawa-dōri Avenue marks the bridge that once crossed the Senkawa Aqueduct in Kami-Shakujii Village's Tateno area, serving as a remnant of where the main village was historically situated.
