= Shakujiidai =

Neighborhood in Nerima Ward, Tokyo

Shakujiidai 石神井台
- Neighborhood (町丁)
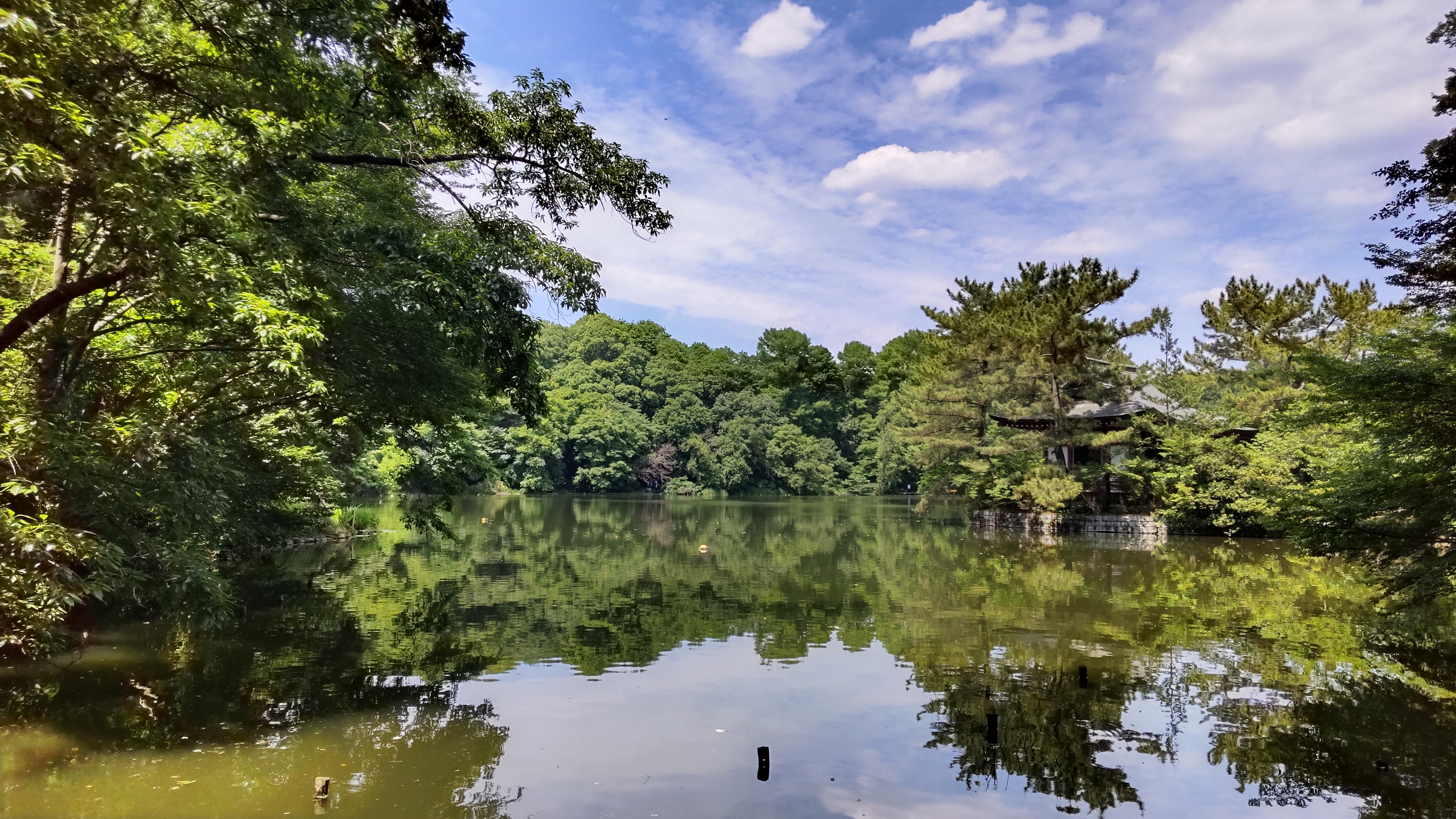
- Sambōji Pond

- Location of Shakujiidai within the Wards Area of Tokyo
- Coordinates: 35°44′14″N 139°35′20″E
- Country: Japan
- Region: Kantō
- Metropolis: Tokyo
- Ward: Nerima

Area
  - Total: 2.241 km^{2} (0.865 sq mi)

Population (March 1, 2007)
  - Total: 30,779
  - Density: 13,734.49/km^{2} (35,572.2/sq mi)
- Time zone: UTC+9 (JST)
- Zip code: 177-0045
- Area code: 03

Shakujiidai (石神井台) is a neighborhood in Nerima Ward, Tokyo. The current administrative names go from Shakujiidai 1st Street to Shakujiidai 8th Street. The residential address system has been implemented.

== Geography ==
It is located in the southwestern part of Nerima Ward. The neighborhood borders Higashi-Ōizumi to the north, Shakujiimachi to the east across Igusa Street, Kami-Shakujii to the south across the Shakujii River, and Sekimachi-Kita to the west.

There are no train stations, but Musashi-Seki Station and Shakujii Station on the Seibu Shinjuku Line, and Ōizumi-gakuen Station and Shakujii-kōen Station on the Seibu Ikebukuro Line are accessible.

== History ==
Formerly it was formed by the Daimon, Numabe, Nishimura, and Koseki areas of Kami-Shakujii Village, Toshima District, Musashi Province.

On July 1, 1970, the residential address system was implemented, and almost all of the former Kami-Shakujii 2nd Street and part of Shimo-Shakujii 2nd Street (around Sanbōji Pond) were combined to form the Shakujiidai neighborhood. Part of the former Kami-Shakujii 2nd Street became part of the Sekimachi-Kita neighborhood in 1978.
