= Omekaido Overbridge =

Omekaido Overbridge 新宿大ガード
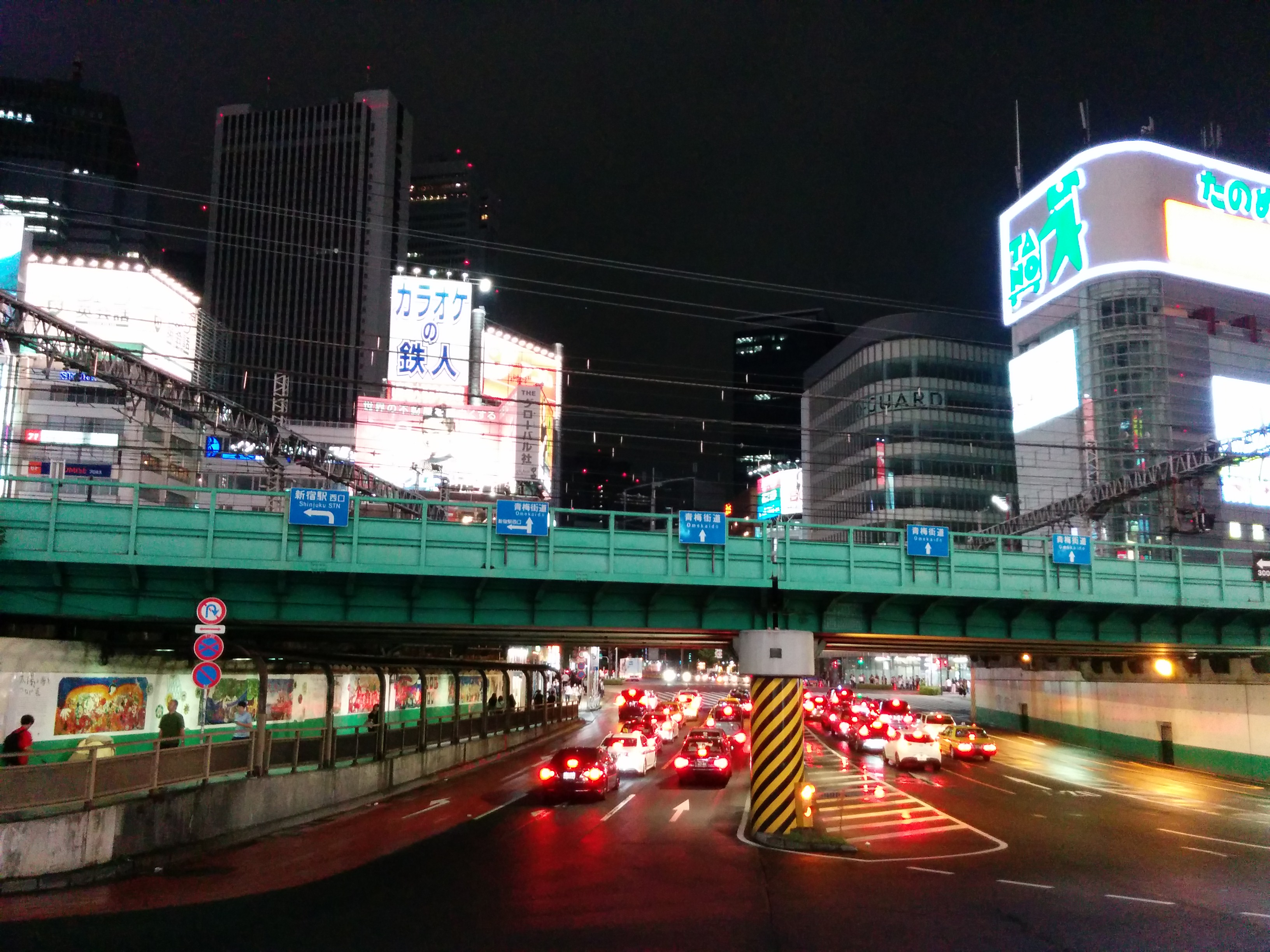
- The bridge in 2018
- Coordinates: 35°41′N 139°42′E
- Carries: Rail lines
- Crosses: Ōme Kaidō highway
- Locale: Shinjuku, Tokyo, Japan

The Omekaido Overbridge (Japanese: 新宿大ガード) is a rail bridge in Shinjuku, Tokyo, Japan, which carries large number of JR East tracks going into Shinjuku Station over the Ōme Kaidō highway.
