= Sekimachi-Kita =

Sekimachi-Kita 関町北
- Neighborhood (町丁)
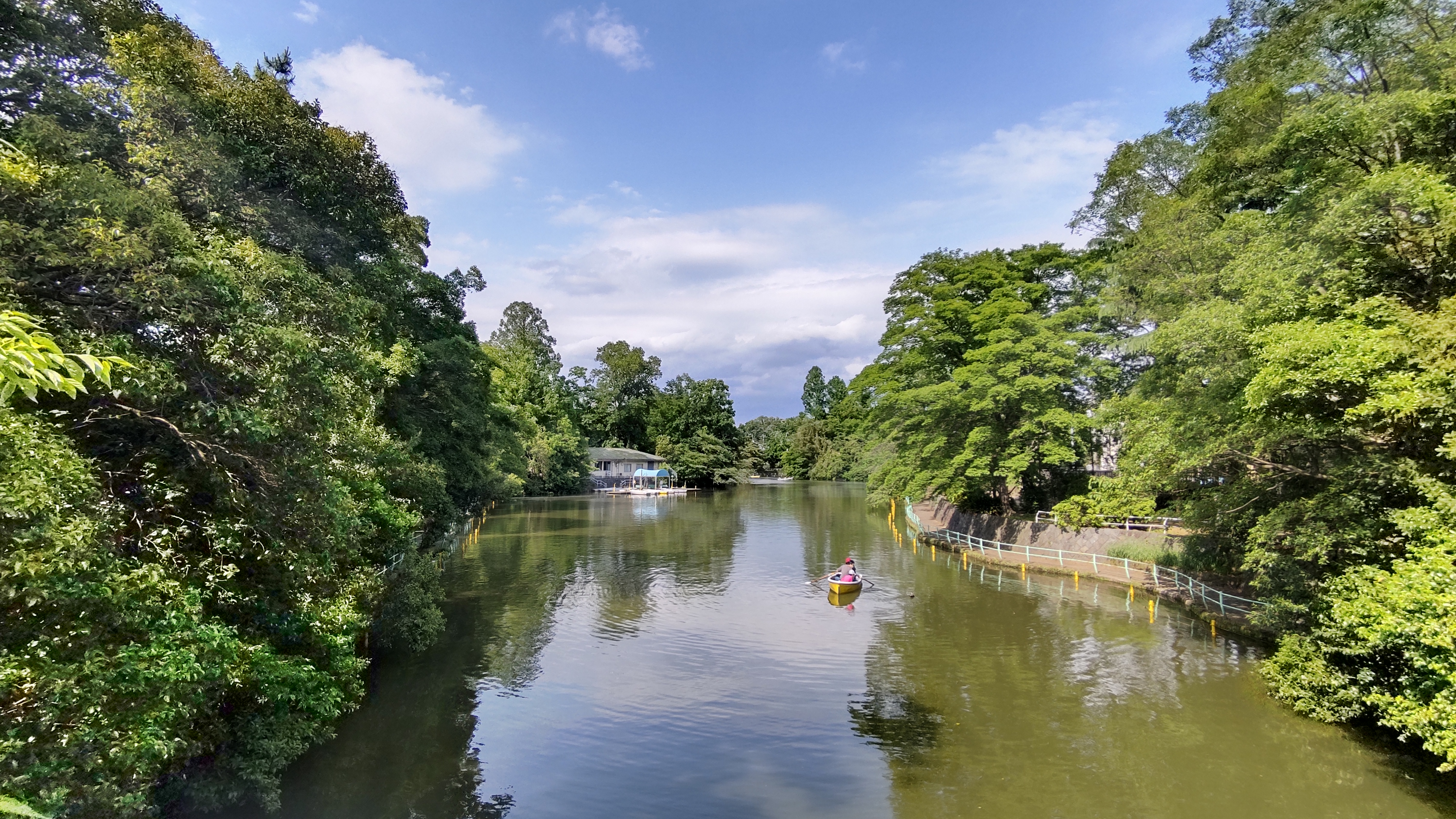
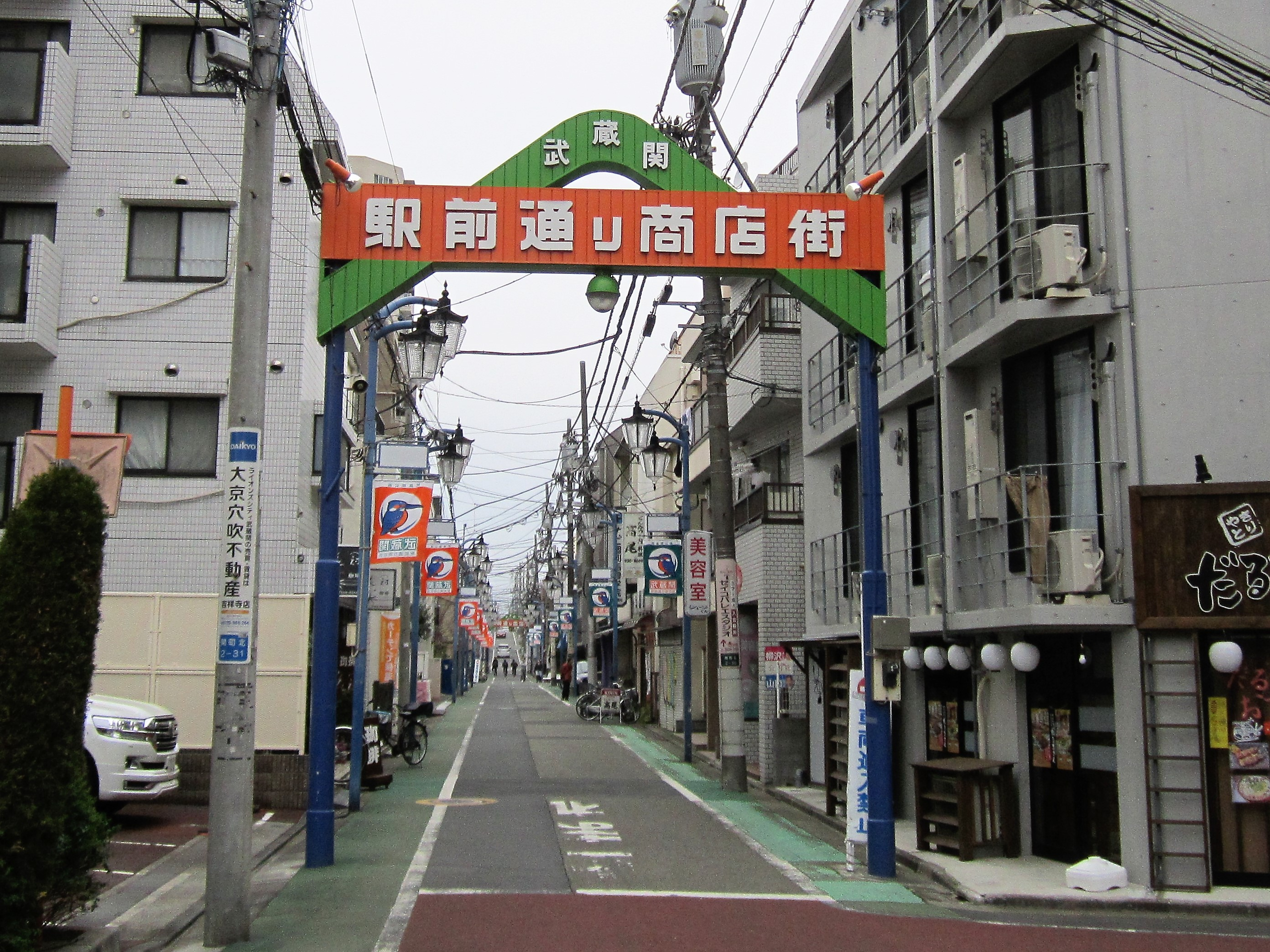
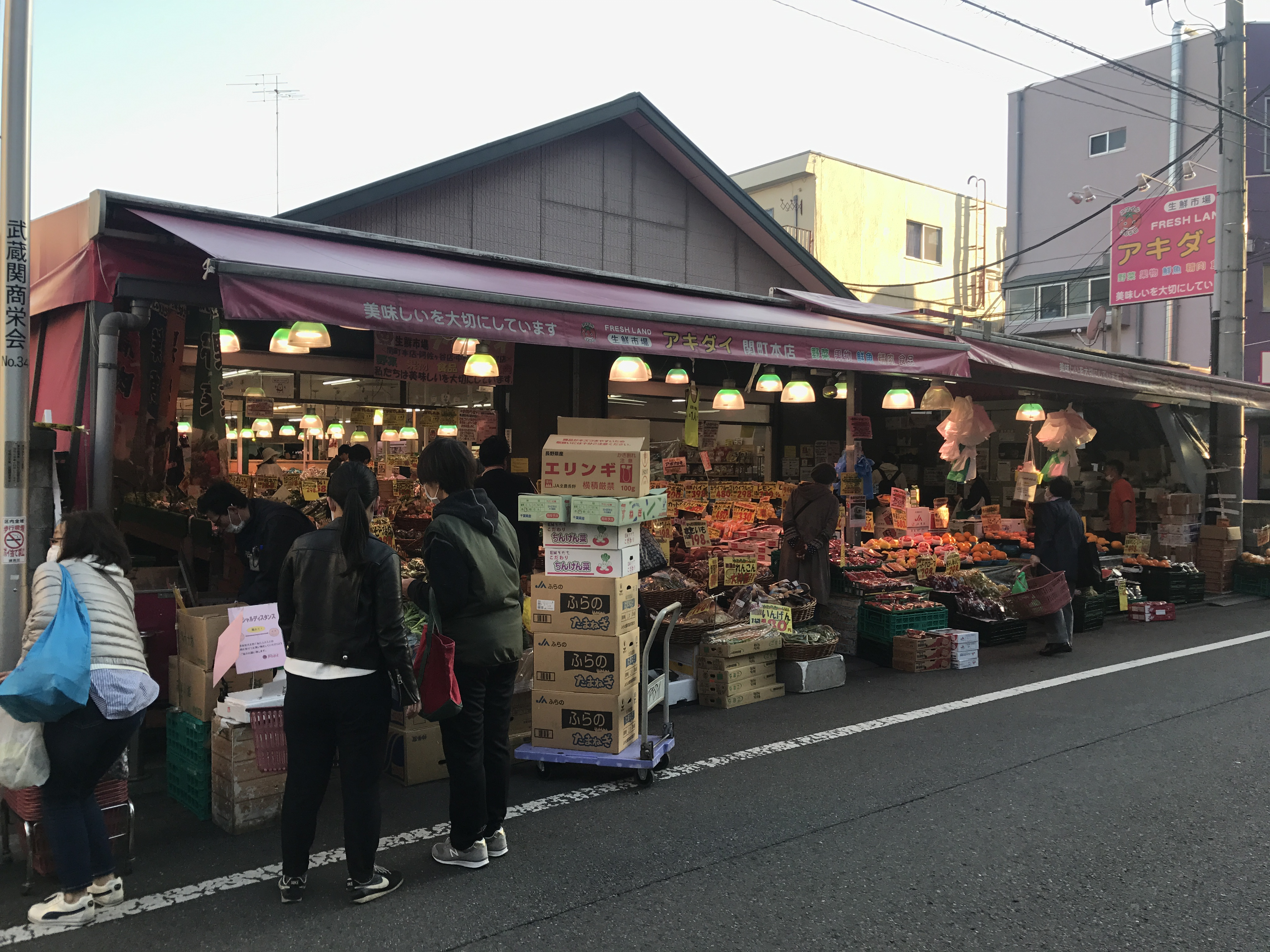
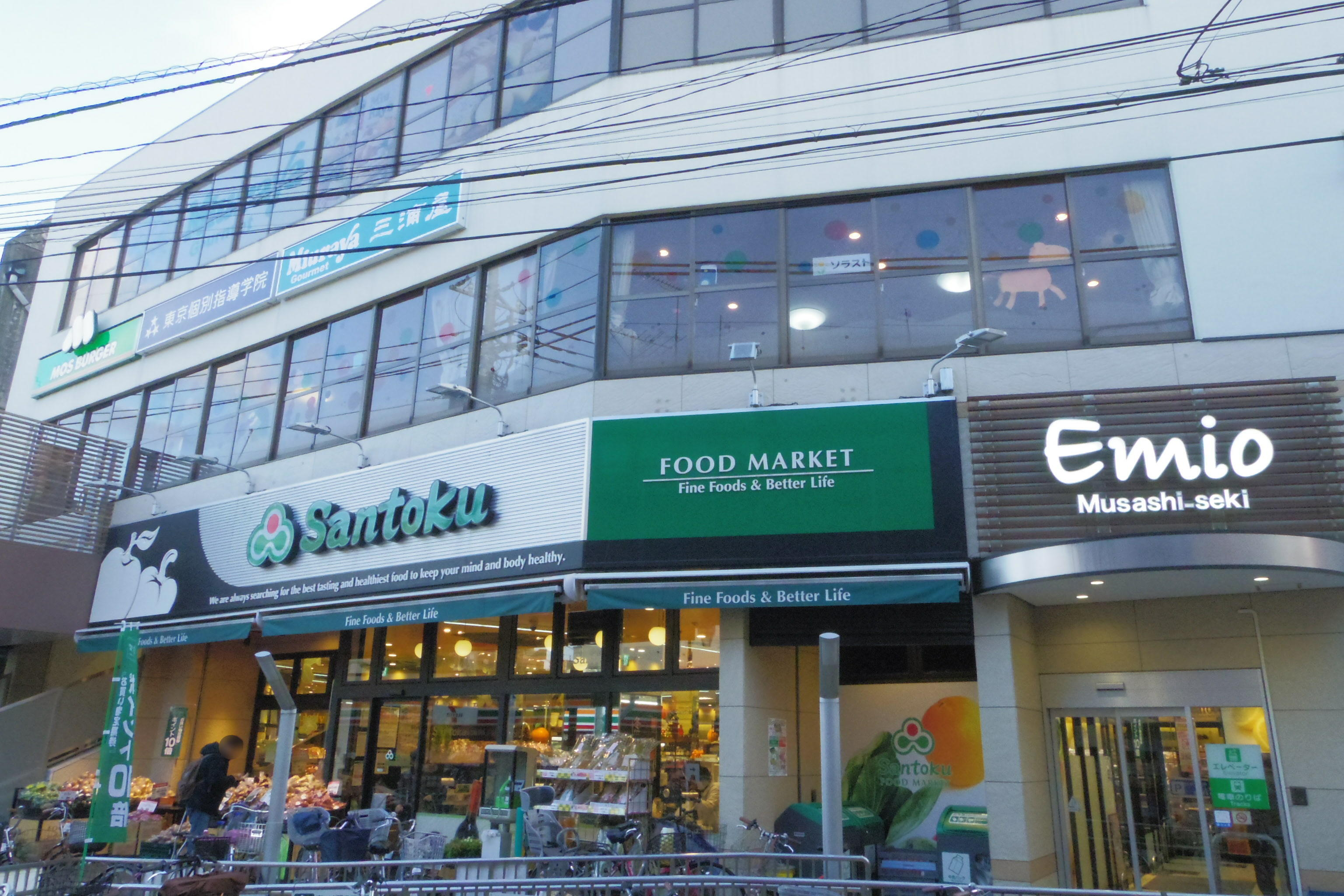
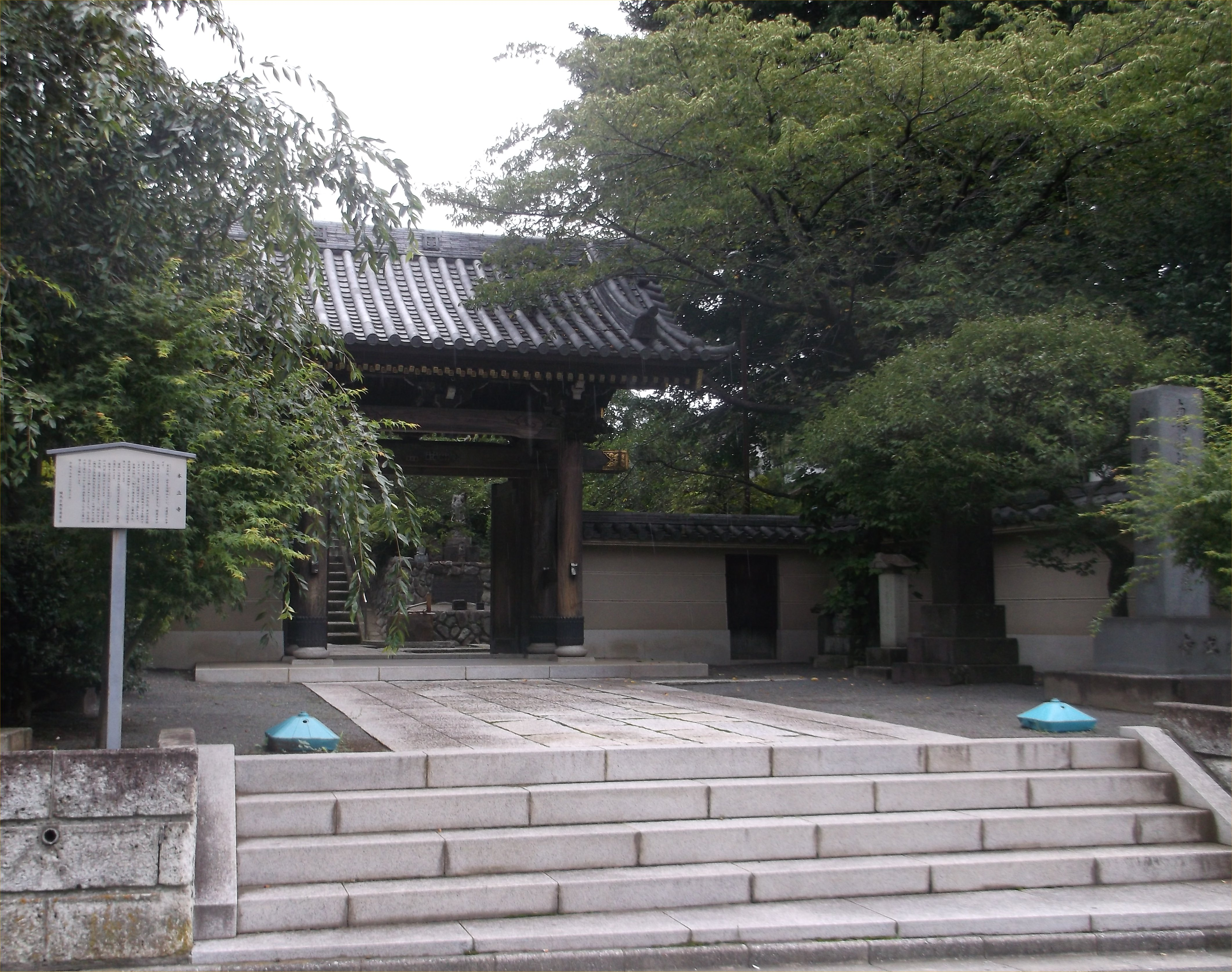

- Location of Sekimachi-Kita within the Wards Area of Tokyo
- Coordinates: 35°43′43.72″N 139°34′23.53″E
- Country: Japan
- Region: Kantō
- Metropolis: Tokyo
- Ward: Nerima

Area
  - Total: 1.344 km^{2} (0.519 sq mi)

Population (December 1, 2017)
  - Total: 22,085
- Time zone: UTC+9 (JST)
- Zip code: 177-0051
- Area code: 03

Sekimachi-Kita (関町北) is a neighborhood of Nerima Ward in Tokyo, Japan. The residential address system has been implemented since January 1, 1978, and the current administrative names go from Sekmachi-Kita 1st Street to 5th Street (丁目, chōme).

The Shakujii River runs through the middle of the neighborhood, along the Seibu Shinjuku Line. Musashi-Seki Station is in the center of the neighborhood, and there is a shōtengai on both the north and south exits. North of the station is Honryūji Temple, known for the traditional Seki-no-Boroichi flea market, which has been held every December since 1751, during the Edo period. Southwest of the station is Musashi-Seki Park, a ward-operated park known for its cherry blossoms in spring and rentable boats. To the south is Ōme-kaidō Avenue, a highway that exists since the Edo period. Several Japanese animation studios are also located in this neighborhood.

== History ==
People first began living in the area during the Paleolithic period. Paleolithic spear-point stone tools excavated from the Musashi-Seki site in Sekimachi-Kita 3rd Street are archaeological evidence that bears witness to this.

During the Nara period, the Tenso Wakamiya Hachimangū Shrine was established in the area, enshrining the tutelary deity.

Around the Muromachi period, the Toshima clan established a checkpoint (関, seki) in the area, when they had their castle in Shakujii. According to various Edo-period documents, including the Shinpen Musashi Fudo-kikō (『新編武蔵風土記稿』), the village of Seki (関村, Seki-mura) gets its name from this checkpoint.
Another theory suggests the village's name comes from a dam (堰, seki) that once stood in the area. An Edo-period village map from 1784 shows a large embankment downstream of a reservoir on the Shakujii River (now Fujimi Pond), suggesting the existence of a dam.

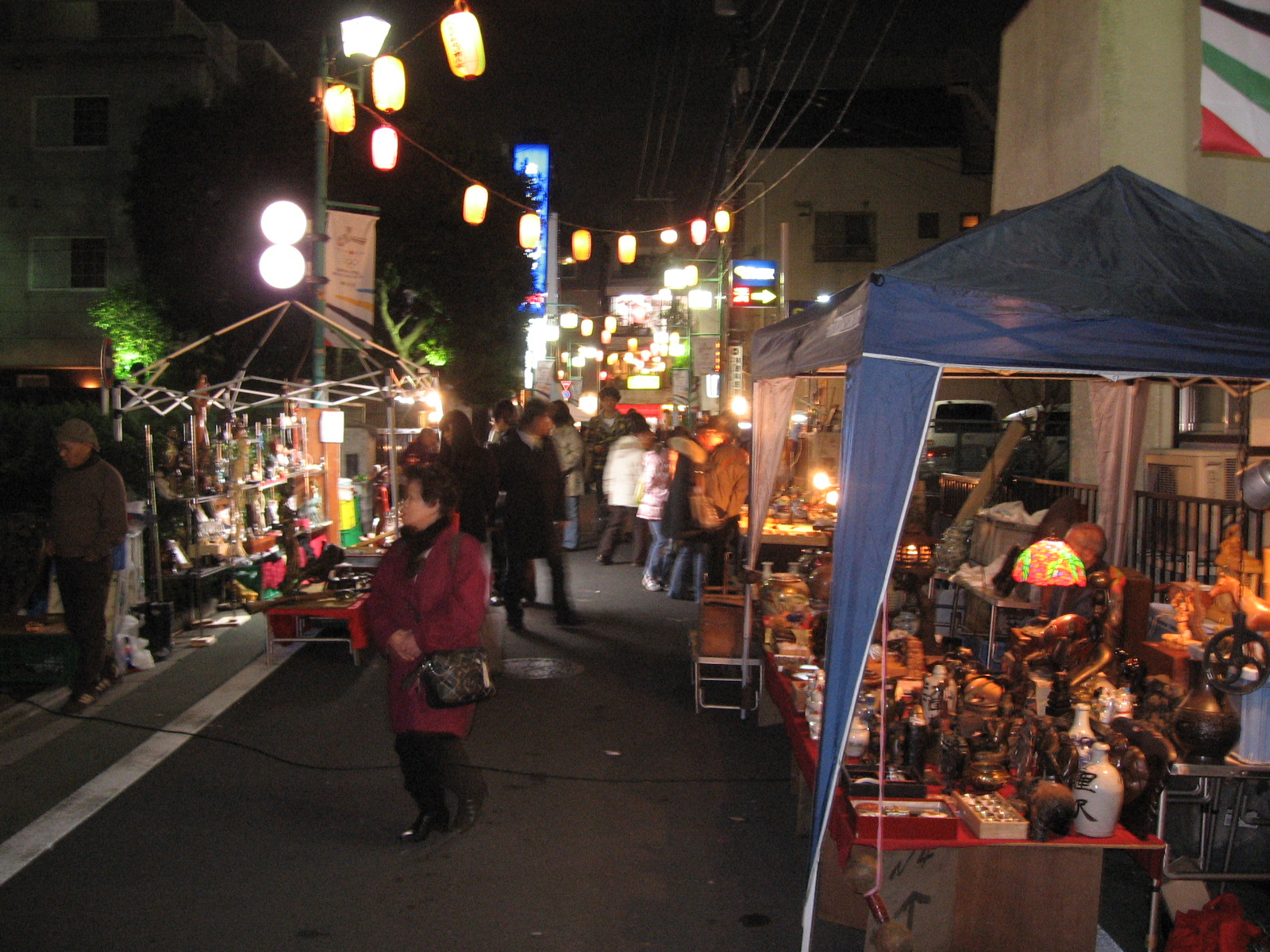
Seki-no-Boroichi traditional market.

During the Edo period, the village of Seki was in the Toshima District of Musashi Province. The Ōme-kaidō Avenue, one of the main highways leading to Edo, ran through the village.
The Seki-no-Boroichi Market started to be held from December, 1751, in front of Honryūji Temple, and is still held to this day.
According to the Shinpen Musashi Fudo-kikō, the village of Seki was composed of several smaller sections (小名, kona). Ōzeki (大関) and Koseki (小関) were north of the Shakujii River, now Sekimachi-Kita 4th Street. Kuzuhara (葛原) and Kobitai (小額) were south of the river and north of Ōme-kaidō Avenue, now 1st to 3rd Street.

During the Meiji era, on May 1, 1889, the village of Seki became part of the village of Shakujii (石神井村 Shakujii-mura) in Kita-Toshima Disctrict, Tokyo Urban Prefecture (東京府, Tōkyō-fu).

During the Taishō era, the private park Wakamiya Playground (若宮遊園, Wakamiya-yūen) opened close to the Tenso Wakamiya Hachimangū Shrine. The park would later become Musashi-Seki Park.

During the Shōwa era, on April 16, 1927, Musashi-Seki Station opened. It was run by the Murayama Line (now called Seibu Shinjuku Line), which run from Higashi-Murayama Station to Takadanobaba Station. It only had a south entrance at that point.

On October 1, 1932, the area became part of the Shakujii-Sekimachi neighborhood (from 2nd Street to 3rd Street) in Itabashi Ward, Tokyo City.

On August 1, 1947, Nerima Ward was established out of the west part of Itabashi Ward, and Shakujii-Sekimachi became part of Nerima Ward.

In 1949, the area became part of the Sekimachi neighborhood (from 2nd to 6th Streets) in Nerima Ward, Tokyo Metropolis.

On January 1, 1978, due to the implementation of the residential addressing system based on the Act on Residential Addresses (Act No. 119 of May 10, 1962) in Nerima Ward, the Sekimachi neighborhood was divided and Sekimachi-Kita was established out of Sekimachi 5th and 6th Streets, parts of Sekimachi 2nd to 4th Street, and parts of Kami-Shakujii 2nd Street.

== Education ==
The Nerima Ward Board of Education operates public elementary and junior high schools.

As of July 2022, Sekimachi-Kita's designated school areas are as follows:

Street	Blocks	小学校	中学校
1st Street	All	Shakujii-Nishi Elementary School	Shakujii-Nishi Junior High School
2nd Street	All	Sekimachi Elementary School	Shakujii-Nishi Junior High School
3rd Street	All	Sekimachi Elementary School	Shakujii-Nishi Junior High School
4th Street	All	Sekimachi-Kita Elementary School	Seki Junior High School
5th Street	All	Sekimachi-Kita Elementary School	Seki Junior High School

== Businesses ==
The main local businesses are anime studios and Akidai supermarket. The number of establishments and employees according to the Economic Census Survey as of 2021 is as follows:

Street	Establishments	Employees
1st Street	128	1,105
2nd Street	182	1,439
3rd Street	77	549
4th Street	147	1,588
5th Street	83	965
Total	617	5,646

=== Anime studios ===
- Studio Blanc
- Asahi Production
- Diomedéa
- Kachigarasu (Encourage Films)
- Studio Gallop

== Facilities ==
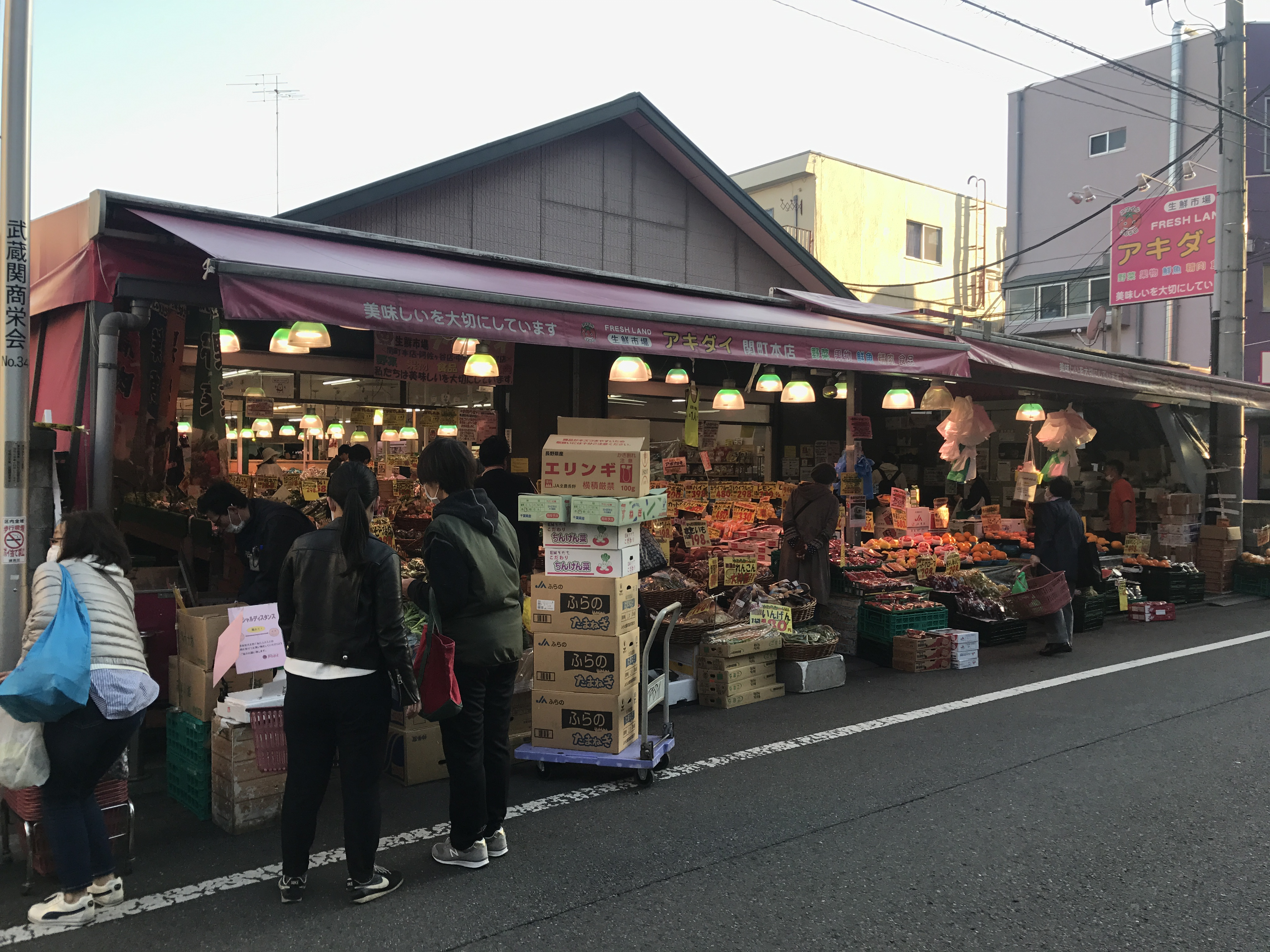
Akidai Main Store.

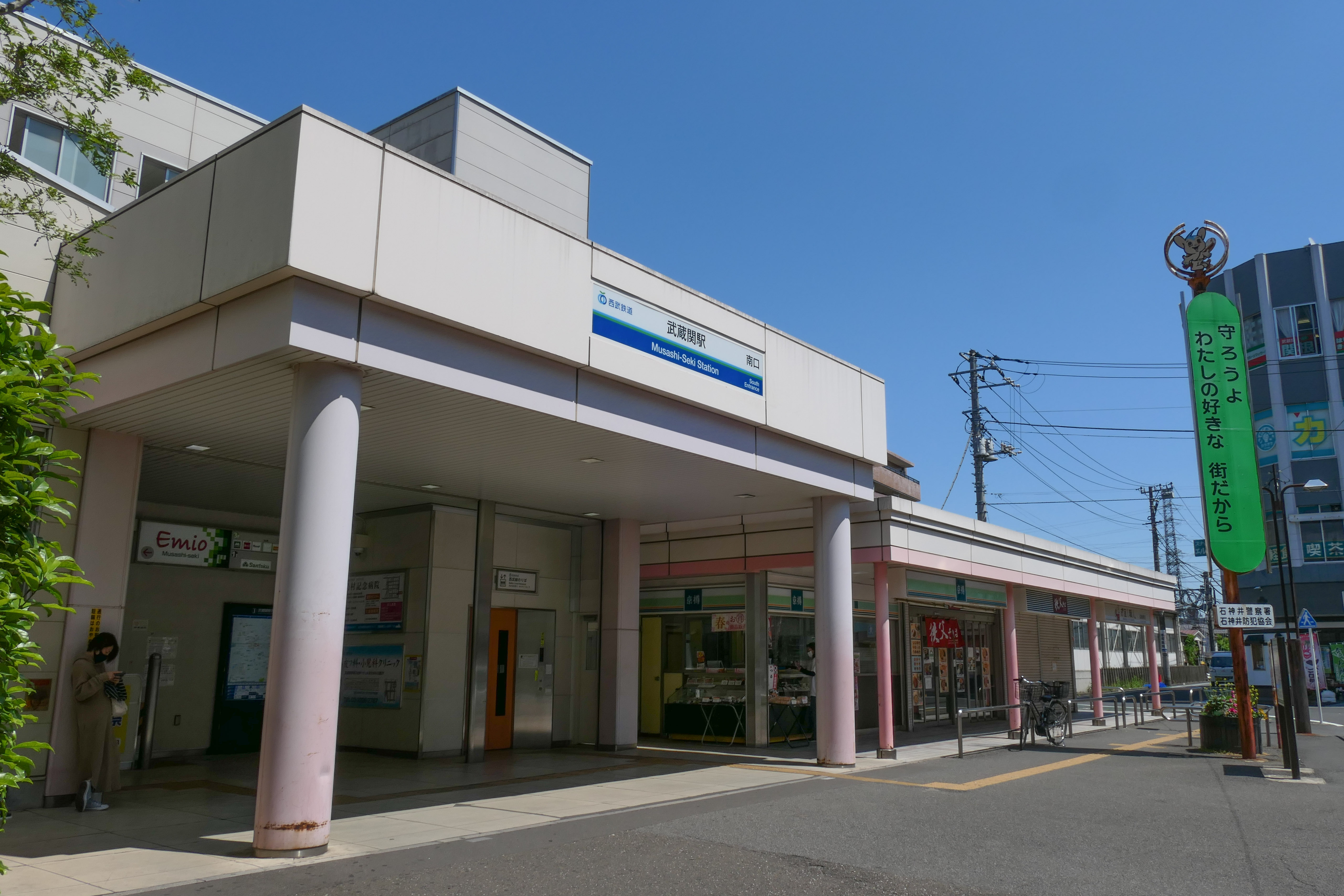
Musashi-Seki Station's south exit.

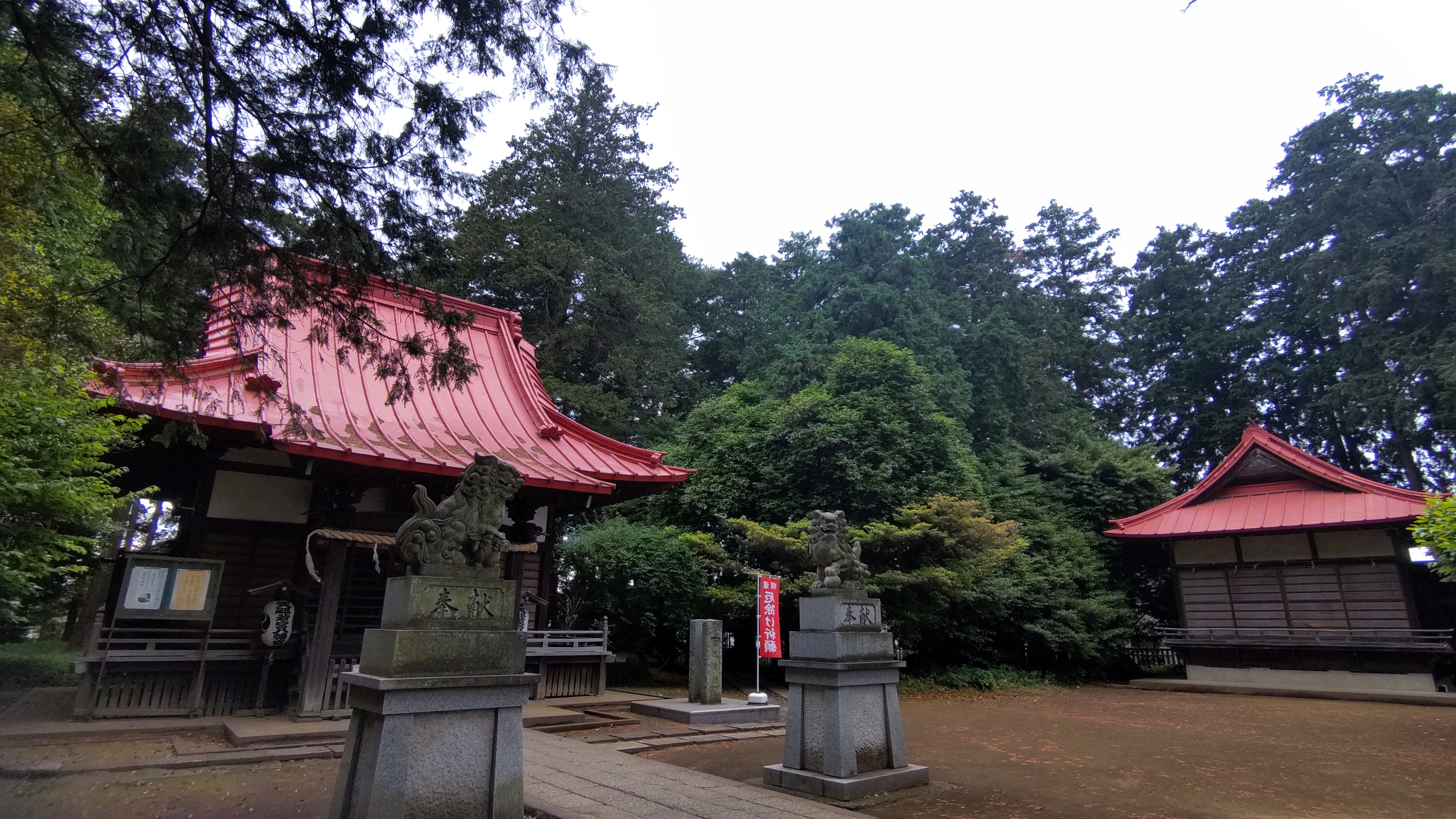
Tenso Wakamiya Hachimangū Shrine.

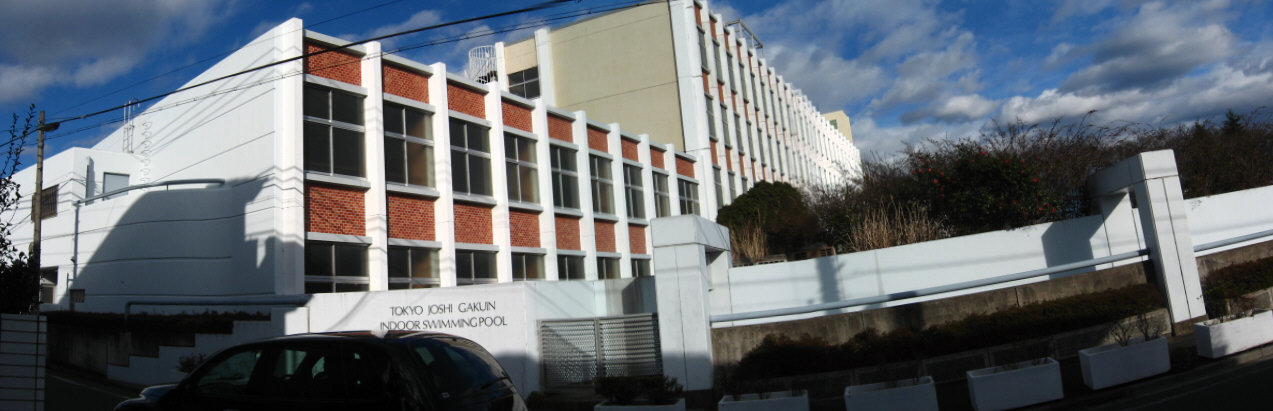
Tokyo Girls Academy.

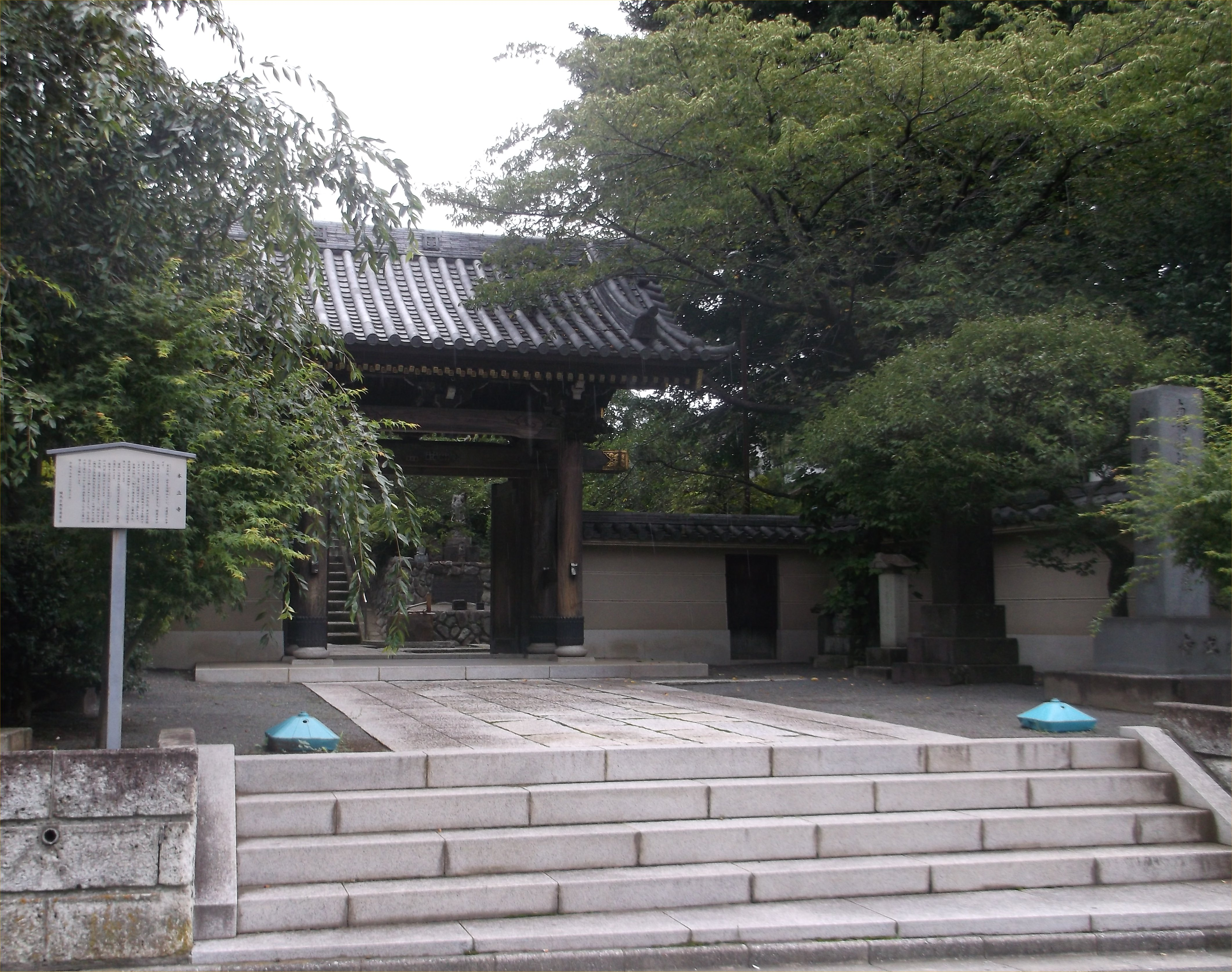
Honryūji Temple.

=== 1st Street ===
- Shakujii Fire Station (Sekimachi Branch Office), Tokyo Fire Department
- Nerima Ward Seki Community Center
  - Seki Residents' Office
- 2nd Kame-no-yu (Public Bath)
- Akidai Sekimachi Main Store
- Rico's Sekimachi-Kita 1st Street Store
- Welpark Musashi-Seki Station Front Store
- Studio Blanc (Anime Studio)

=== 2nd Street ===
- Musashi-Seki Station (South Exit)
- Shakujii Police Station (Musashi-Seki Station Front police box), Tokyo Police Department
- Nerima Sekimachi Post Office
- Shimamura Memorial Hospital
- St. Therese of the Infant Jesus Church (Sekimachi Catholic Church)
- Sekimachi Chigusa Kindergarten
- Ginza Yamagataya Sekimachi Store
- Essence Sekimachi Store (Don Quijote)
- Anime Studios
  - Asahi Production Head Office
  - Diomedéa
  - Kachigarasu (Encourage Films)
- Sumitomo Mitsui Banking Corporation Musashiseki Branch

=== 3rd Street ===
- Musashi-Seki Park
- Tenso Wakamiya Hachimangū Shrine (established in the Nara period)
- Nerima Ward Sekimachi Elementary School
- Studio Gallop (Anime Studio)

=== 4th Street ===
- Tokyo Metropolitan Shakujii High School
- Eimei Frontier Junior & Senior High School
- Nerima Ward Seki Junior High School
- Musashi-Seki Station (North Exit)
  - Emio Musashi-Seki
  - Lotus Road - Connected to the ticket gates
- Honryūji Temple (Nichiren Sect), famous for the Seki-no-Boroichi Market held annually at this temple on December since 1751, designated as a Nerima Ward Intangible Folk Cultural Property
- Musashi-Seki Ekimae Post Office
- Order of Friars Minor Conventual Friary (Catholic Chapel)
- Sisters of Saint Paul of Chartres Convent

=== 5th Street ===
- Nerima Ward Sekimachi-Kita Elementary School
- Yellow Hat (along Shin-Ōme Kaidō)

== Postal Code ==
The postal code is 177-0051, and belongs to the Shakujii Postal Office area.
