= Musashi-Seki Station =

Railway station in Tokyo, Japan

Coordinates: 35.7277°N 139.5763°E

SS14 Musashi-Seki Station 武蔵関駅
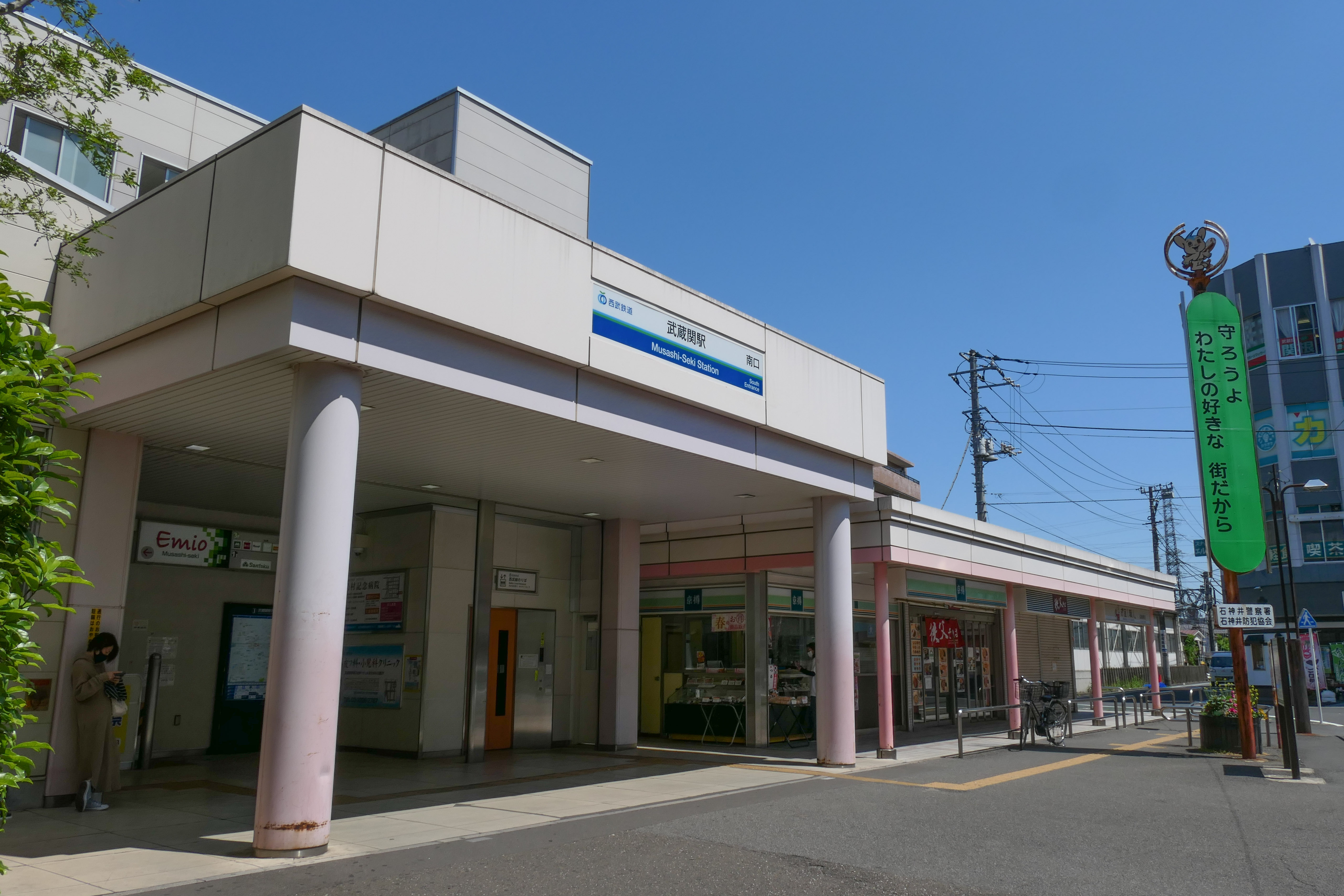
- South entrance, April 2021

General information
- Location: 2-29-1 Sekimachikita, Nerima, Tokyo （東京都練馬区関町北） Japan
- Operator: Seibu Railway
- Line: Seibu Shinjuku Line
- Platforms: 2 side platforms
- Tracks: 2
- Connections: Bus terminal

Other information
- Station code: SS14

History
- Opened: 16 April 1927

Passengers
- FY2013: 28,803 daily

Services
Preceding station	Seibu Railway	Following station
Higashi-Fushimi SS15 towards Hon-Kawagoe	Shinjuku Line Semi Express Local	Kami-Shakujii SS13 towards Seibu-Shinjuku
Location

Musashi-Seki Station (武蔵関駅, Musashi-Seki-eki) is a railway station on the Seibu Shinjuku Line in Nerima Ward, Tokyo, Japan, operated by the private railway operator Seibu Railway. Its station number is SS14.

== Lines ==
Musashi-Seki Station is served by the 47.5 km Seibu Shinjuku Line from Seibu-Shinjuku in Tokyo to Hon-Kawagoe in Saitama Prefecture. Located between Kami-Shakujii and Higashi-Fushimi, it lies 14.4 km from the Shinjuku terminus. Only all-stations "Local" services and "Semi-Express" services stop at this station.

== Station layout ==
The station structure is located over the tracks, with one set of ticket barriers, and station entrances on the north and south sides.

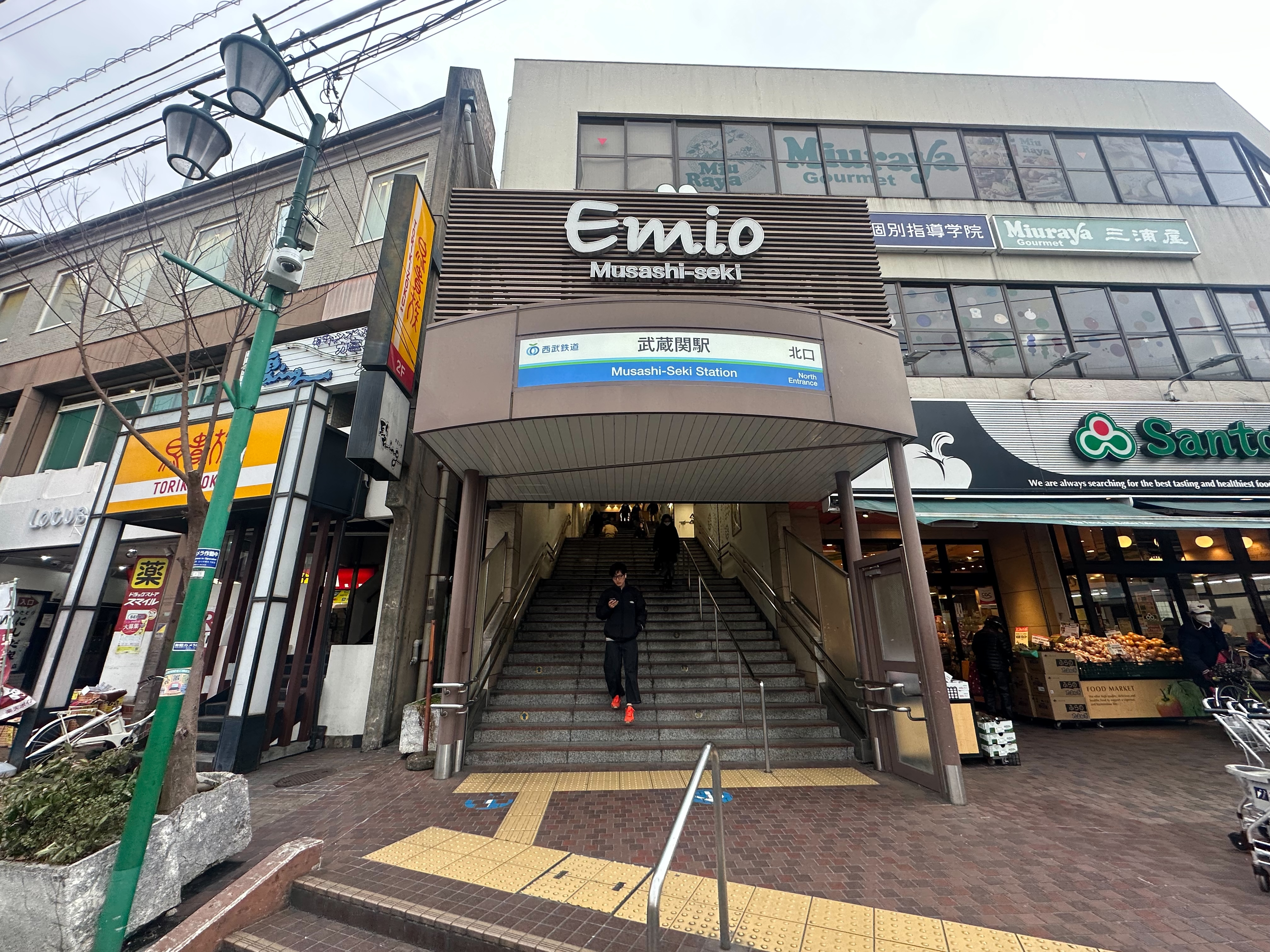
North entrance, March 2025

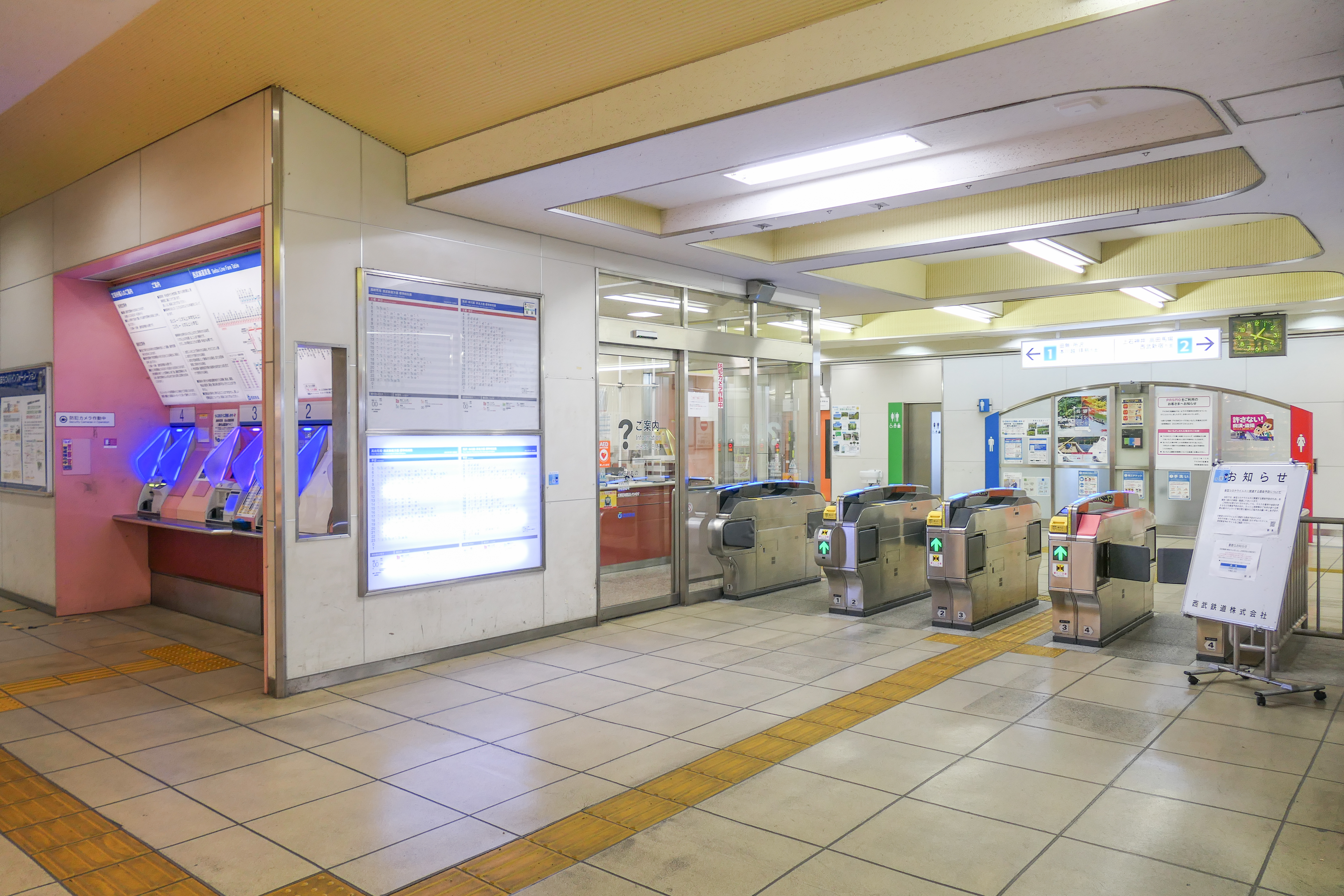
The ticket barriers, June 2022

=== Platforms ===
The station is composed of two side platforms serving two tracks.

1	Seibu Shinjuku Line	for Tanashi, Tokorozawa, Haijima, and Hon-Kawagoe
2	Seibu Shinjuku Line	for Takadanobaba and Seibu-Shinjuku

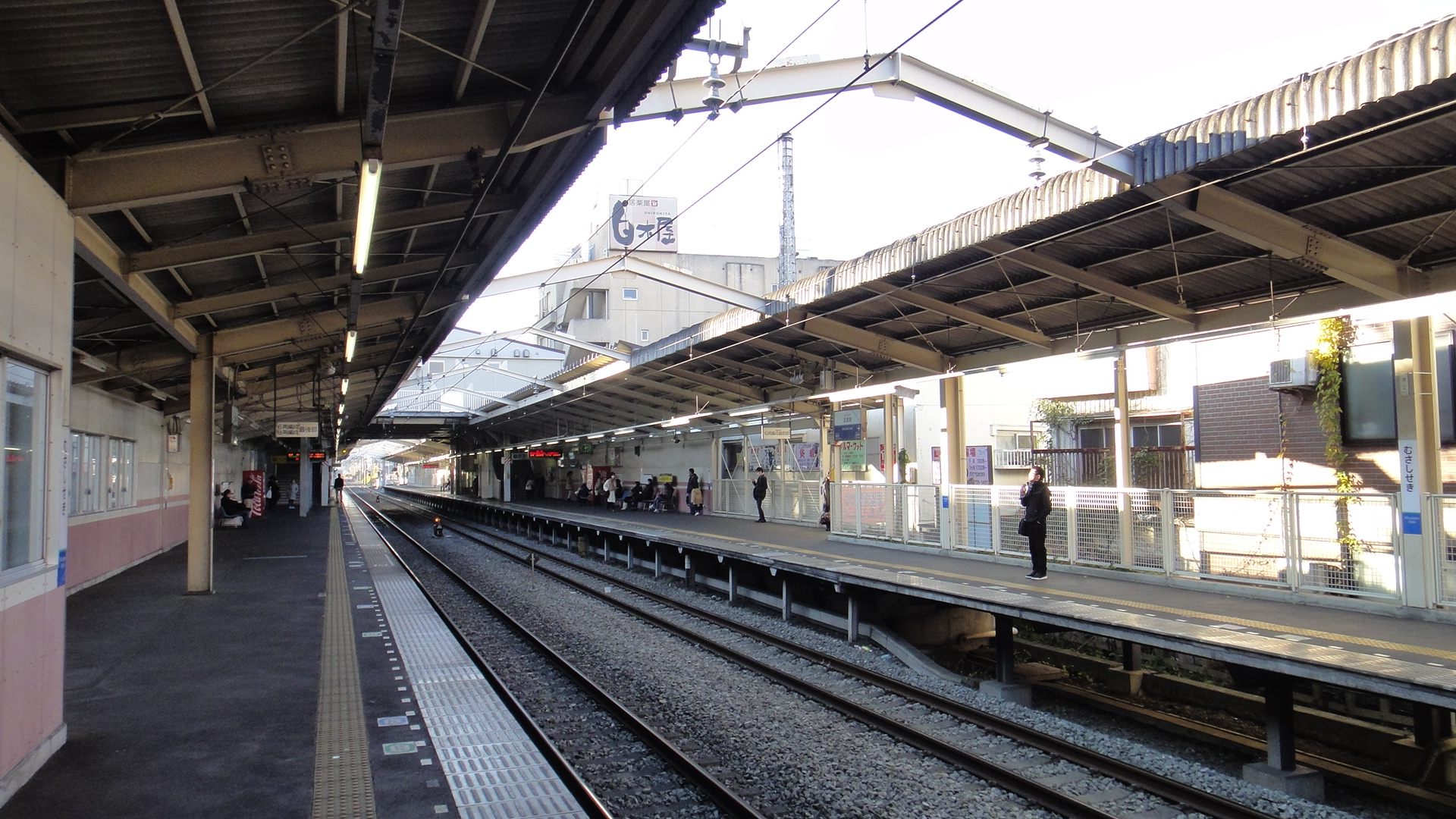
View from the east (Shinjuku) end of platform 1, December 2012

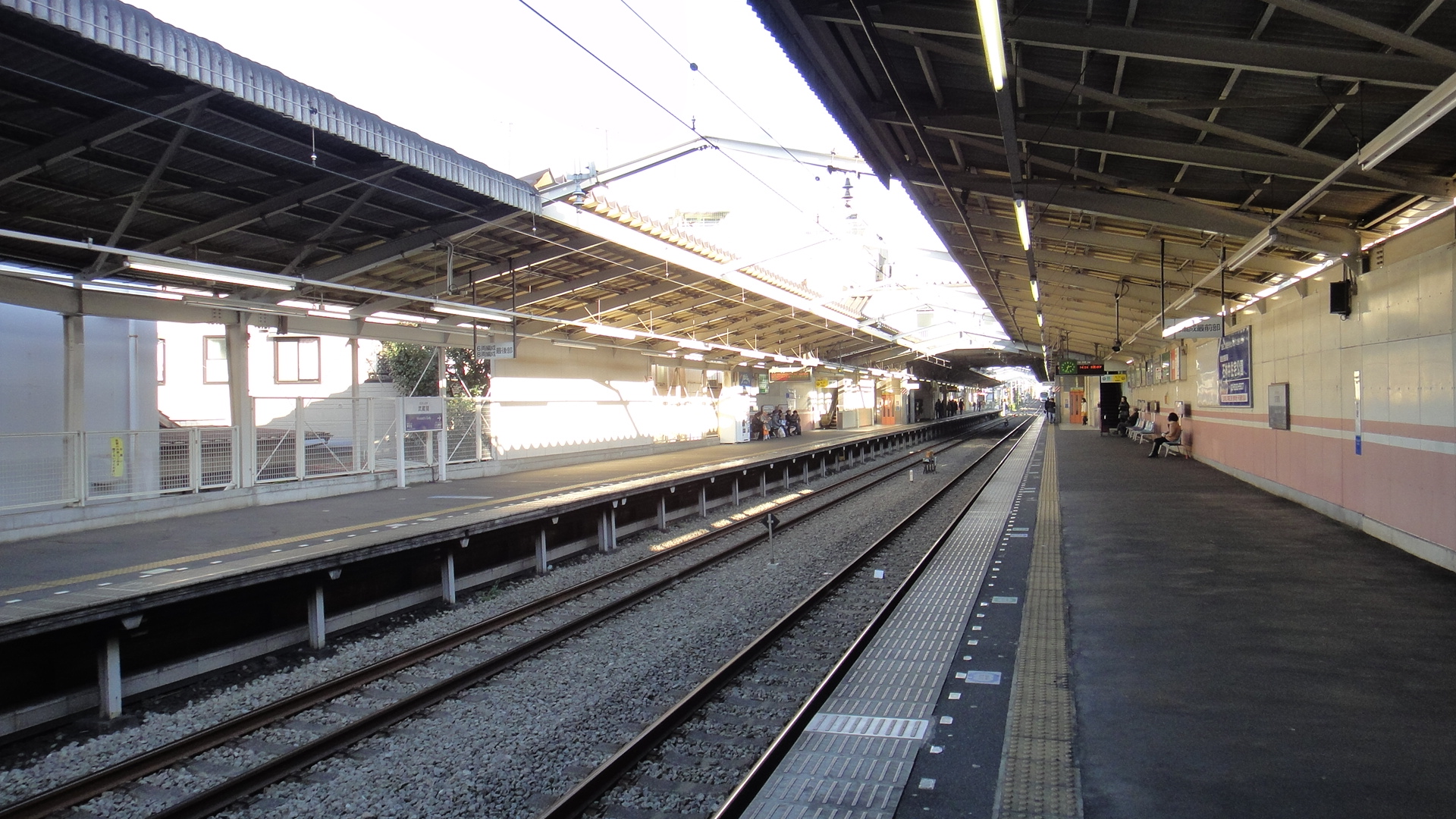
View from the west (Kawagoe) end of platform 1, December 2012

== History ==
The station opened on 16 April 1927.

Station numbering was introduced on all Seibu Railway lines during fiscal 2012, with Musashi-Seki Station becoming "SS14".

== Passenger statistics ==
In fiscal 2013, the station was the 34th busiest on the Seibu network with an average of 28,803 passengers daily.

The passenger figures for previous years are as shown below.

Fiscal year	Daily average
2009	28,859
2010	28,091
2011	27,864
2012	28,477
2013	28,803

== Surrounding area ==
=== North side ===
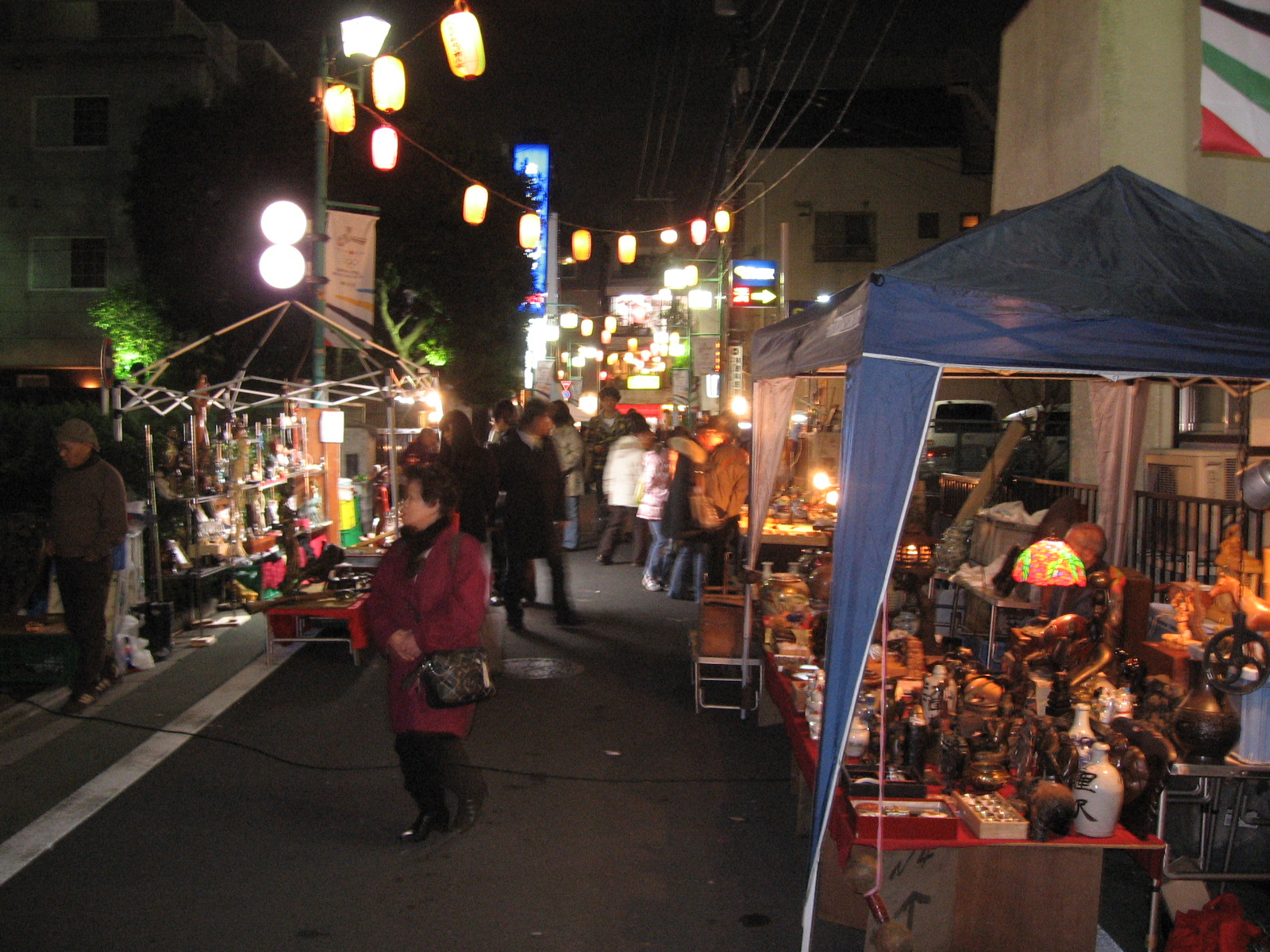
Seki-no-Boroichi Market, next to Musashi-Seki Station.

North of the station is Honryūji Temple, known for the traditional Seki-no-Boroichi flea market, which has been held every December since 1751 during the Edo period.

==== Parks and shrines ====
- Honryūji Temple
- Jesuit Kami-Shakujii Monastery

==== Educational institutions ====
- Sophia University Shakujii campus
- Japan Catholic Seminary
- Tokyo Shakujii High School
- Tokyo Joshi Gakuin Junior & Senior High School
- Sekimachi-Kita Elementary School

==== Rivers and roads ====
- Shakujii River

=== South side ===
South of the station is Musashi-Seki Park, a ward-operated park known for its cherry blossoms in spring and rentable boats. The local Ward Office and several Japanese animation studios are also located near the south exit.

==== Parks and shrines ====
- Musashi-Seki Park
- Tenso Wakamiya Hachimangū Shrine (established in the Nara period)
- St. Therese of the Infant Jesus Church (Sekimachi Catholic Church)

==== Anime studios ====
- Asahi Production
- ascension Inc.
- Diomedéa
- Kachigarasu (Encourage Films)
- Studio Blanc
- Studio Gallop
- Studio Tulip

==== Public institutions ====
- Nerima Ward Seki Residents’ Office (Seki Community Center and Civic Hall)
- Shakujii Police Station (Musashi-Seki Ekimae police box)
- Shakujii Fire Station (Sekimachi branch)

==== Financial institutions ====
- Nerima Sekimachi Post Office
- Sumitomo Mitsui Banking Corporation Musashi-Seki Branch
- JA Tokyo Aoba Sekimachi Branch
- Tokyo Shinkin Bank Musashi-Seki Branch

==== Companies and stores ====
- Akidai Main Branch (Sekimachi)

==== Educational institutions ====
- Sekimachi Elementary School
- Shakujii-Nishi Elementary School
- Shakujii-Nishi Junior High School

==== Rivers and roads ====
- Shakujii River
- Ōme Kaidō
