= Shakujiimachi =

Neighborhood in Nerima Ward, Tokyo

Shakujiimachi 石神井町
- Neighborhood (町丁)
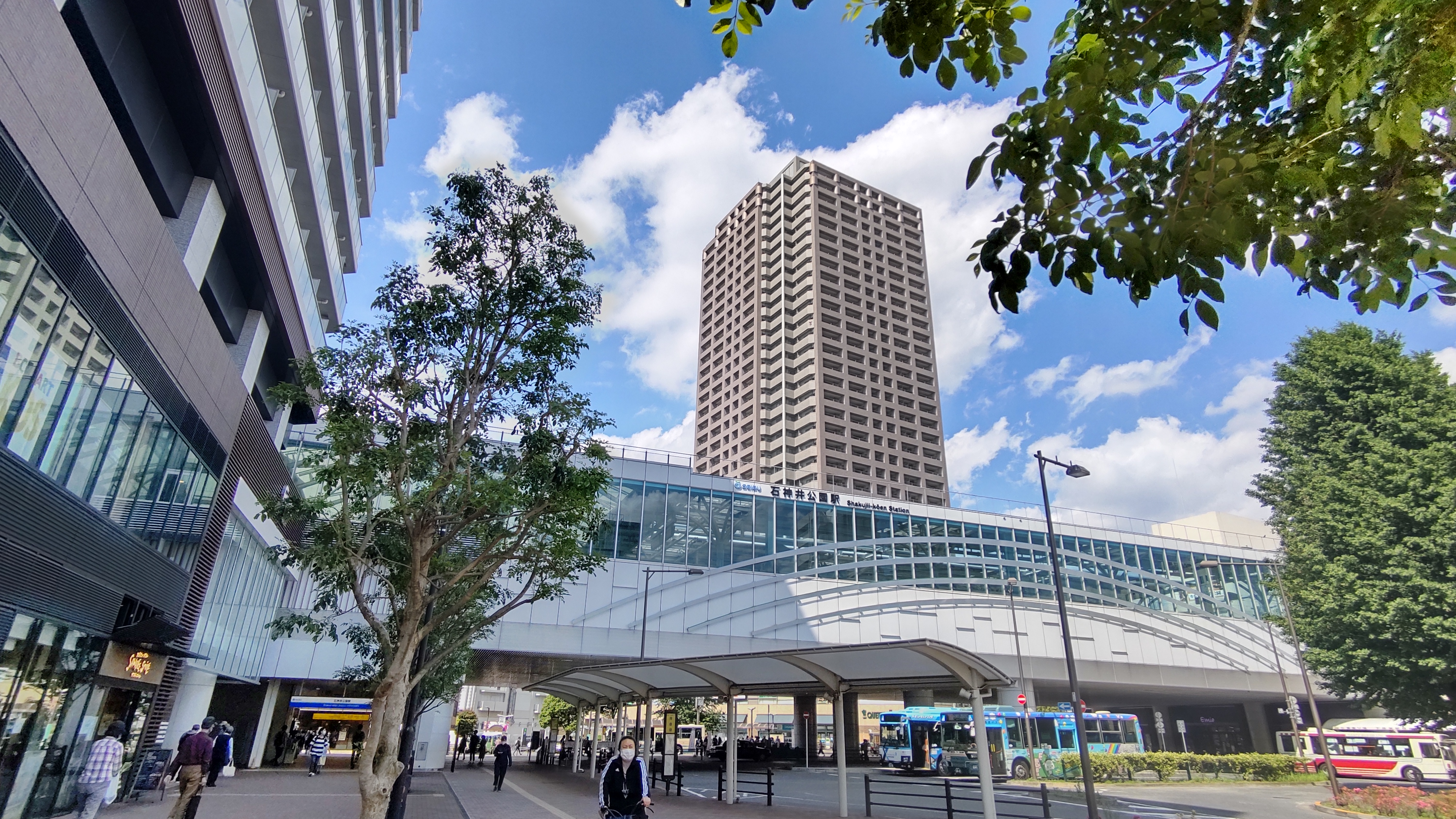
- Shakujii-kōen Station's South Exit.

- Location of Shakujiimachi within the Wards Area of Tokyo
- Coordinates: 35°44′38″N 139°36′21″E
- Country: Japan
- Region: Kantō
- Metropolis: Tōkyō
- Ward: Nerima

Area
  - Total: 1.933 km^{2} (0.746 sq mi)

Population (March 1, 2007)
  - Total: 27,917
  - Density: 14,442.32/km^{2} (37,405.4/sq mi)
- Time zone: UTC+9 (JST)
- Zip code: 177-0041
- Area code: 03

Shakujiimachi (石神井町) is a neighborhood in Nerima Ward, Tokyo. The current administrative names go from Shakujiimachi 1st Street to 8th Street. The residential address system has been implemented.

== Geography ==
Located slightly southwest of the center of Nerima Ward, it is home to Shakujii Park, Shakujii Pond, and Shakujii-kōen Station. The Shakujii River creates the southern border of the neighborhood. It is next to Shakujiidai and Higashi-Ōizumi to the west, Takanodai to the east, Shimo-Shakujii, Minami-Tanaka, and Kami-Shakujii across the Shakujii River to the south, and Miharadai and Yahara to the north.
