= Musashi-Seki Park =

Park in Nerima Ward, Tokyo, Japan

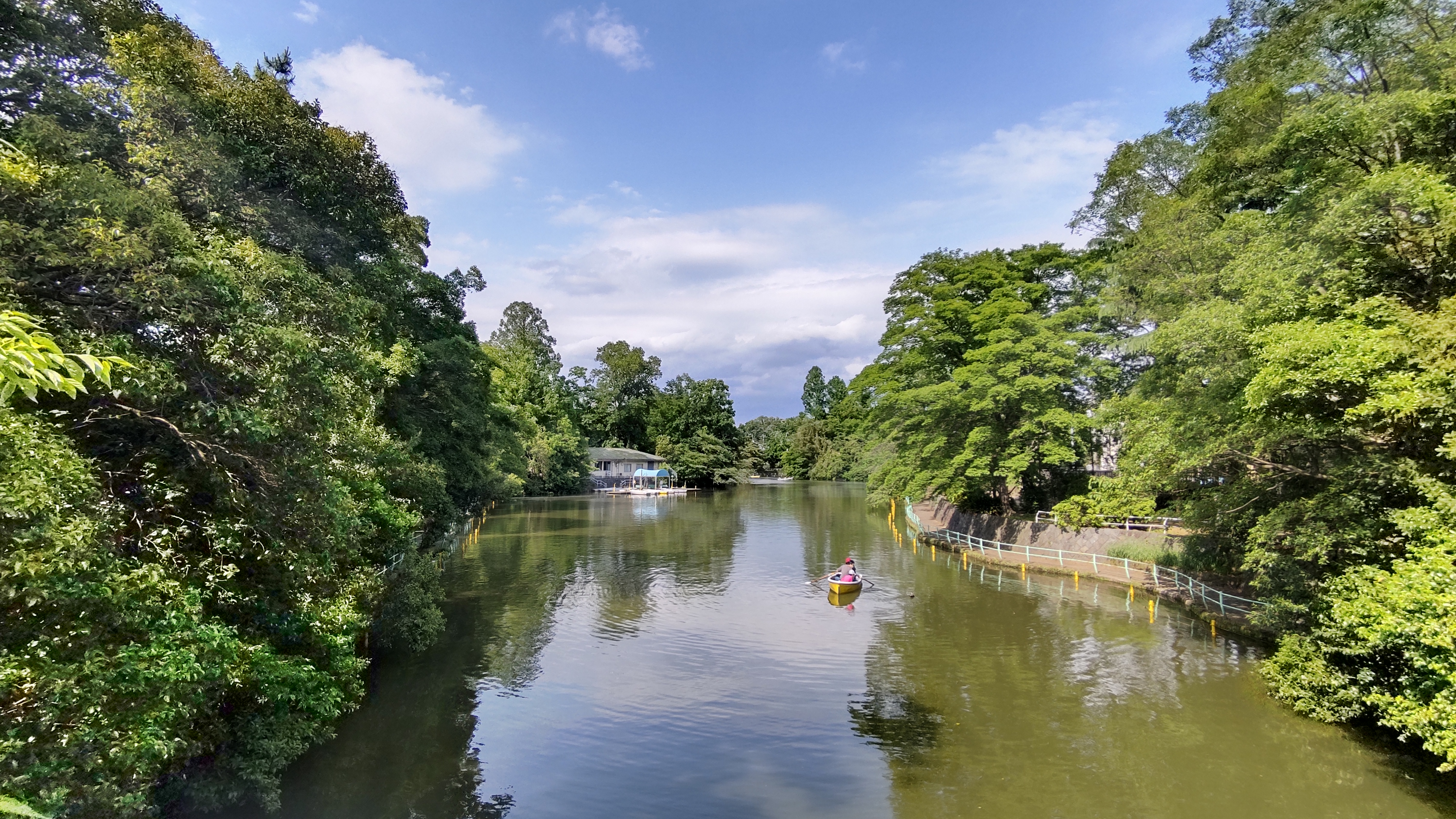
- Fujimi Pond in the park (2006)

- Location within Special wards of Tokyo
- Type: Public park
- Location: Nerima Ward, Tokyo, Japan
- Coordinates: 35.727656°N 139.567809°E
- Area: 45,985 m^{2} (11.363 acres)
- Created: October 1938
- Public transit: Higashi-Fushimi Station, Musashi-Seki Station

Musashi-Seki Park (武蔵関公園, Musashi-seki-kōen) is a public park administered by Nerima Ward in Tokyo, Japan. It is located in Sekimachi-Kita 3-chōme.

The park is noted for its cherry blossoms and for Fujimi Pond, a spring-fed pond where visitors can rent boats. Common kingfishers are frequently observed in the park and have become associated with the Sekimachi-Kita area.

== Fujimi Pond ==
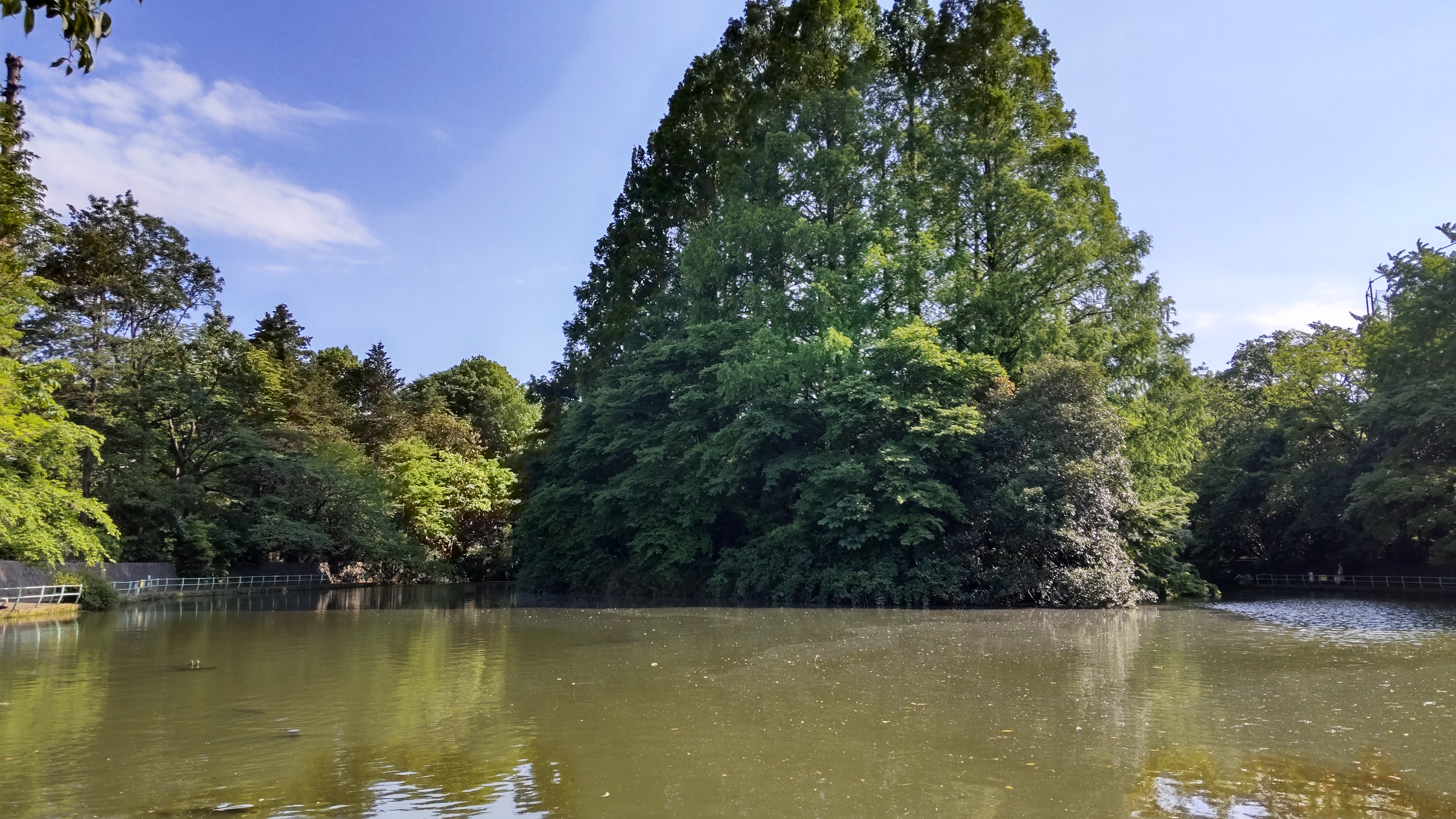
Ashi-no-Shima Island in Fujimi Pond

Fujimi Pond is located within the park and, like nearby ponds in Shakujii Park, Inokashira Park, and Zenpukuji Park, is fed by natural springs from the Musashino Terrace.

Visitors can rent boats and use the pond for recreational boating. The pond also plays a role in regulating the flow of the Shakujii River, which runs alongside it.

Fujimi Pond contains two small islands, Ashi-no-Shima and Matsu-no-Shima.

== History ==
The site originated as a private park in the Taishō era, when it was known as Wakamiya Playground (若宮遊園, Wakamiya-yūen), named after the nearby Wakamiya Shrine. During this period, recreational facilities such as playground equipment were installed.

In 1935, the area was incorporated into a park development project promoted by Tokyo City. Development began on a site of approximately 58,100 square metres (625,000 sq ft) (17,600 tsubo), including a 23,100 square metres (249,000 sq ft) (7,000 tsubo) pond, with a budget of 41,000 yen. At this stage, it was named Musashi-Seki Park.

== Access ==
- 5 minutes' walk from Higashi-Fushimi Station on the Seibu Shinjuku Line
- 10 minutes' walk from Musashi-Seki Station on the same line

== See also ==
- Parks and gardens in Tokyo
- National Parks of Japan
