= Akidai =

Japanese supermarket chain headquartered in Nerima Ward, Tokyo

Akidai Co., Ltd.
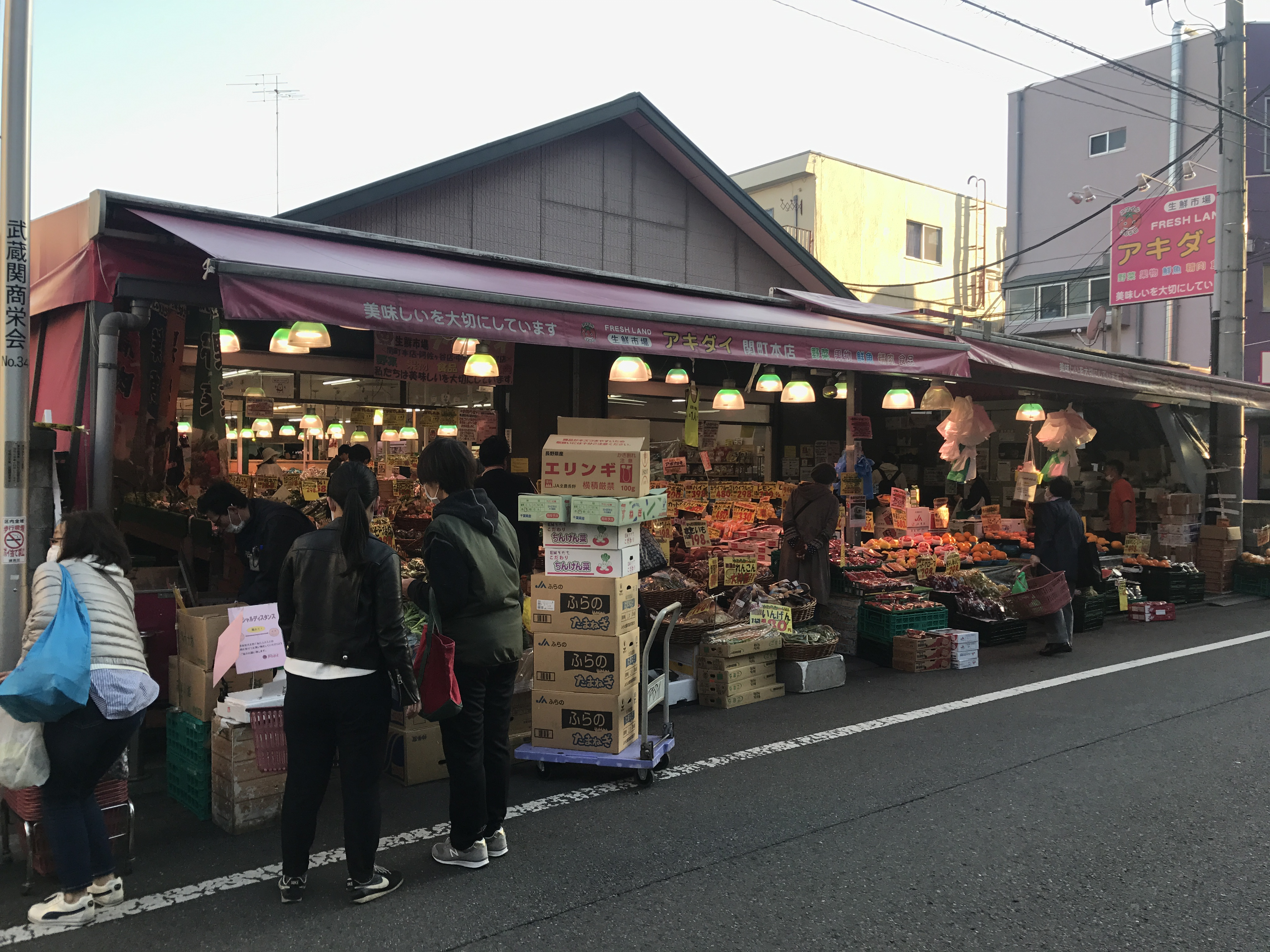
- Akidai Headquarter in Sekimachi-Kita
- Company type: Public
- Industry: Retail
- Founded: 1992
- Founders: Akiba Hiromichi
- Headquarters: Nerima Ward, Tokyo, Japan
- Number of locations: 9
- Area served: Tokyo
- Website: https://www.akidai.jp

Akidai is a supermarket chain headquartered in Nerima Ward, Tokyo. It is a subsidiary of the OIC Group Co., Ltd. As of May 2025, there are nine supermarkets and three restaurants in Tokyo.

The headquarter is located in Sekimachi-Kita, Nerima Ward. It is close to the major Tokyo broadcasting stations, and as a small or medium-sized company, it is easy to get interviews from them. As a result, they are often interviewed by various TV stations' news programs, both national and local, when it comes to topics such as the rising prices of vegetables due to the weather or the consumption tax increase.

== History ==
Akiba Hiromichi founded Akidai Co., Ltd. and opened the current Sekimachi main store in 1992. In 2023, the company was acquired by the OIC Group, which also operates Lopia, and was reorganized into a joint-stock company. Akiba Hiromichi, the company's representative director, serves as the group's fruit and vegetable advisor for Lopia.
