= Kami-Shakujii =

Neighborhood in Nerima Ward, Tokyo

Kami-Shakujii 上石神井
- Neighborhood (町丁)
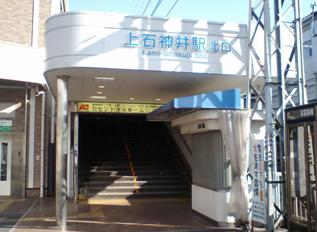
- Kami-Shakujii Station, north exit

- Location of Kami-Shakujii within the Wards Area of Tokyo
- Coordinates: 35°43′41″N 139°35′29″E
- Country: Japan
- Metropolis: Tokyo
- Ward: Nerima

Area
  - Total: 1.346 km^{2} (0.520 sq mi)

Population (March 1, 2007)
  - Total: 20,417
  - Density: 15,168.65/km^{2} (39,286.6/sq mi)
- Time zone: UTC+9 (JST)
- Zip code: 177-0044
- Area code: 03

Kami-Shakujii (上石神井) is a neighborhood in Nerima Ward, Tokyo. The current administrative names go from Kami-Shakujii 1st Street to 4th Street. The residential address system has been implemented.

== Geography ==
The area serves as the hub of southwestern Nerima Ward and is centered around Kami-Shakujii Station, an express stop on the Seibu Shinjuku Line.

The neighborhood is bounded by the Shakujii River to the north, separating it from Shakujiidai. To the east, Igusa Street, which leads to Shakujii Park, forms the boundary with Shimo-Shakujii. The southern edge is defined by Senkawa Street and the Ōme-kaidō Avenue (the latter connecting to the south exit of Shinjuku Station), where it meets Sekimachi-Minami and Kami-Shakujii-Minamichō. Sekimachi-Higashi lies to the west.
