= Sekimachi-Minami =

Sekimachi-Minami 関町南
- Neighborhood (町丁)
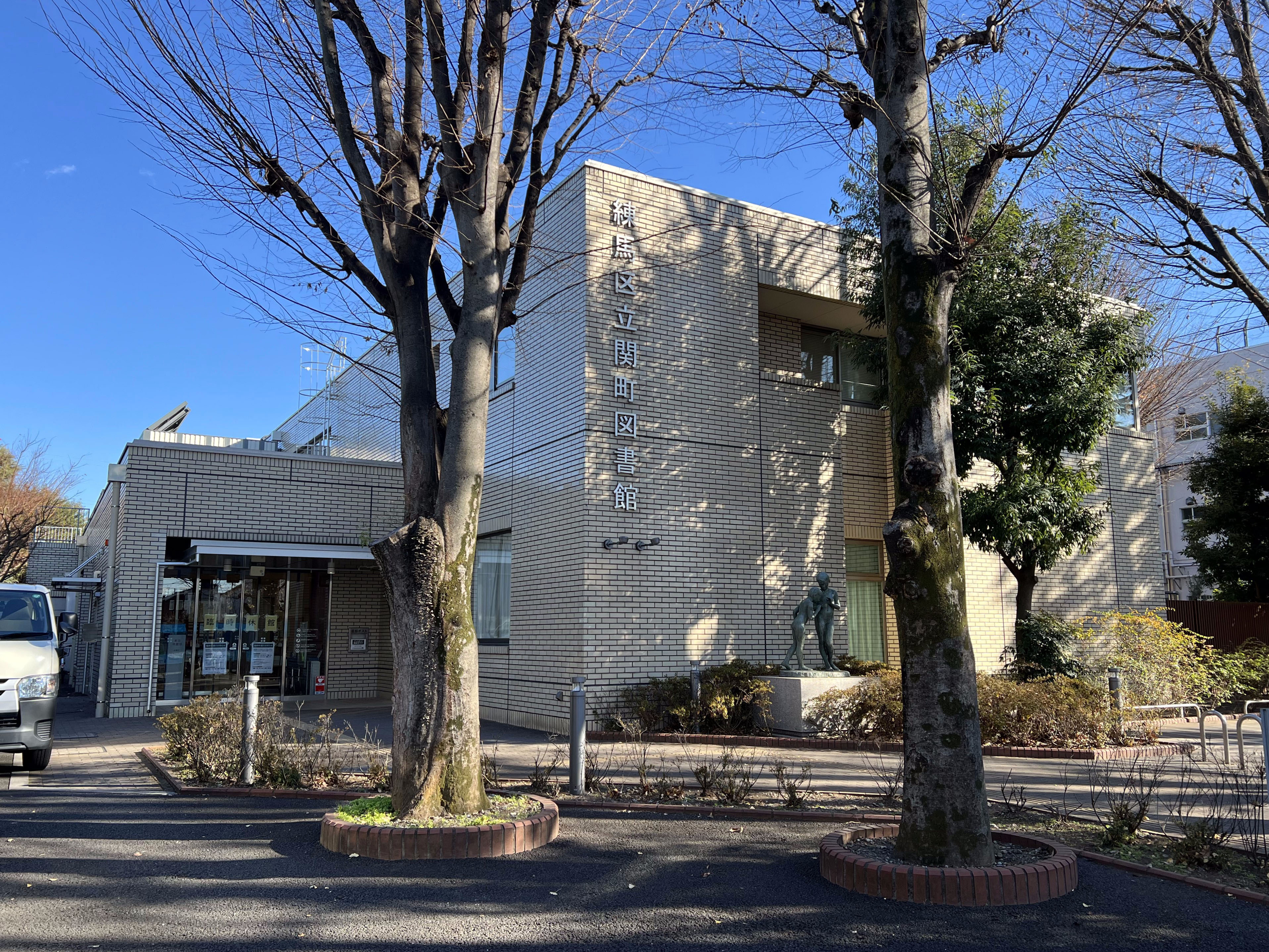
- Nerima Ward Sekimachi Library

- Location of Sekimachi-Minami within the Wards Area of Tokyo
- Coordinates: 35°43′16″N 139°34′53″E
- Country: Japan
- Metropolis: Tokyo
- Ward: Nerima

Area
  - Total: 1.048 km^{2} (0.405 sq mi)

Population (December 1, 2017)
  - Total: 18,889
  - Density: 18,023.85/km^{2} (46,681.6/sq mi)
- Time zone: UTC+9 (JST)
- Zip code: 177-0053
- Area code: 03

Sekimachi-Minami (関町南) is a neighborhood of Nerima Ward in Tokyo, Japan. The residential address system has been implemented since June 1, 1984, and the current administrative names go from Sekmachi-Minami 1st Street to 4th Street (丁目, chōme).

== Geography ==
The neighborhood is located in the southwestern part of Nerima Ward. The northern part borders the neighborhoods Sekimachi-Kita, Sekimachi-Higashi, Kami-Shakujii, and Kami-Shakujii-Minamichō in Nerima Ward. The eastern part of the neighborhood borders the Kami-Igusa and Zenpukuji neighborhoods in Suginami Ward, the southern part borders, the Tatenochō neighborhood in Nerima Ward, the Kichijōji-Kitamachi and Midorichō neighborhoods in the city of Musashino. The western part borders the Higashi-Fushimi neighborhood in the city of Nishitōkyō.
