= Ōme-kaidō Avenue =

Avenue in Tokyo

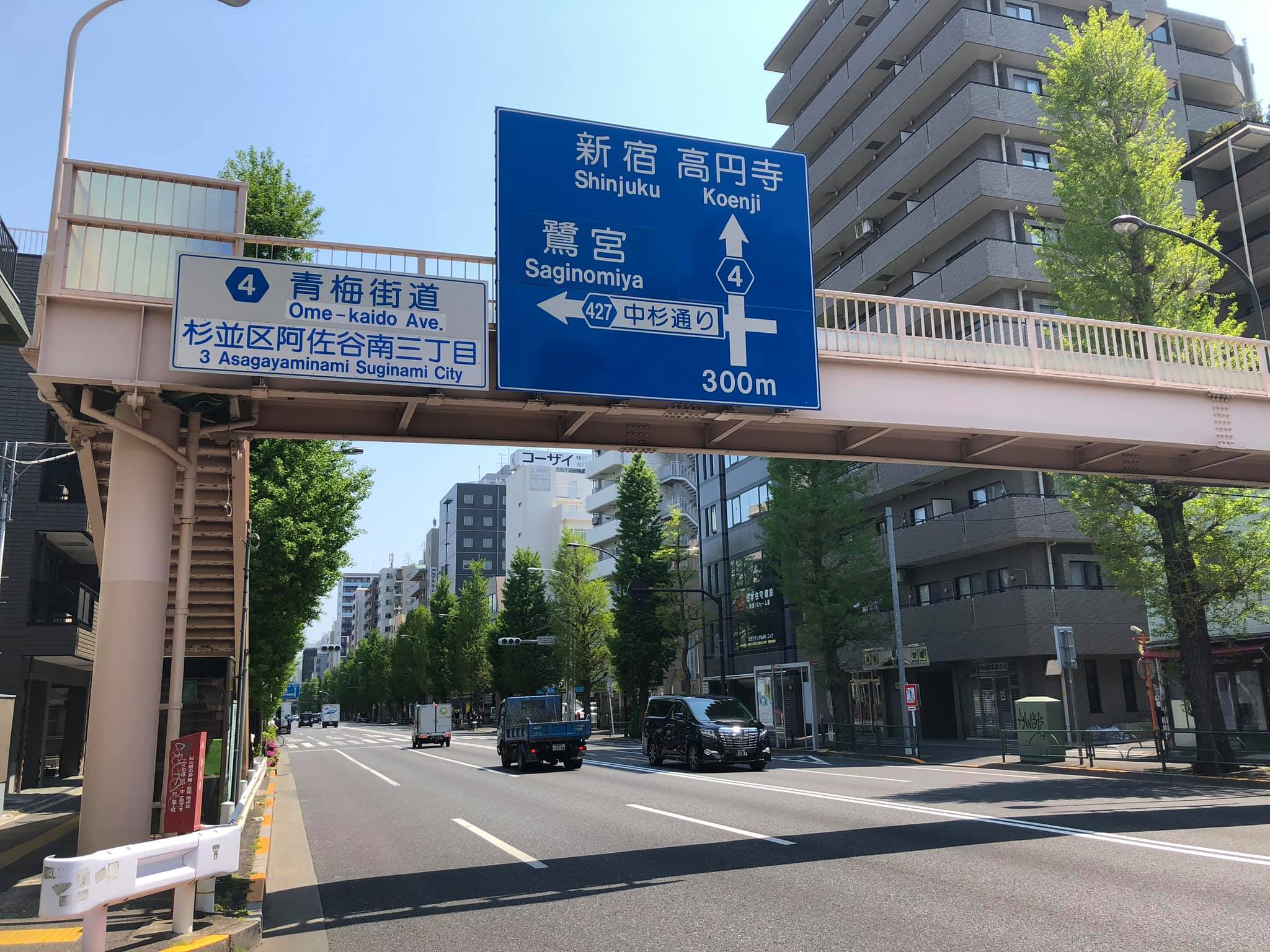
Ōme-kaidō Avenue in Asagaya

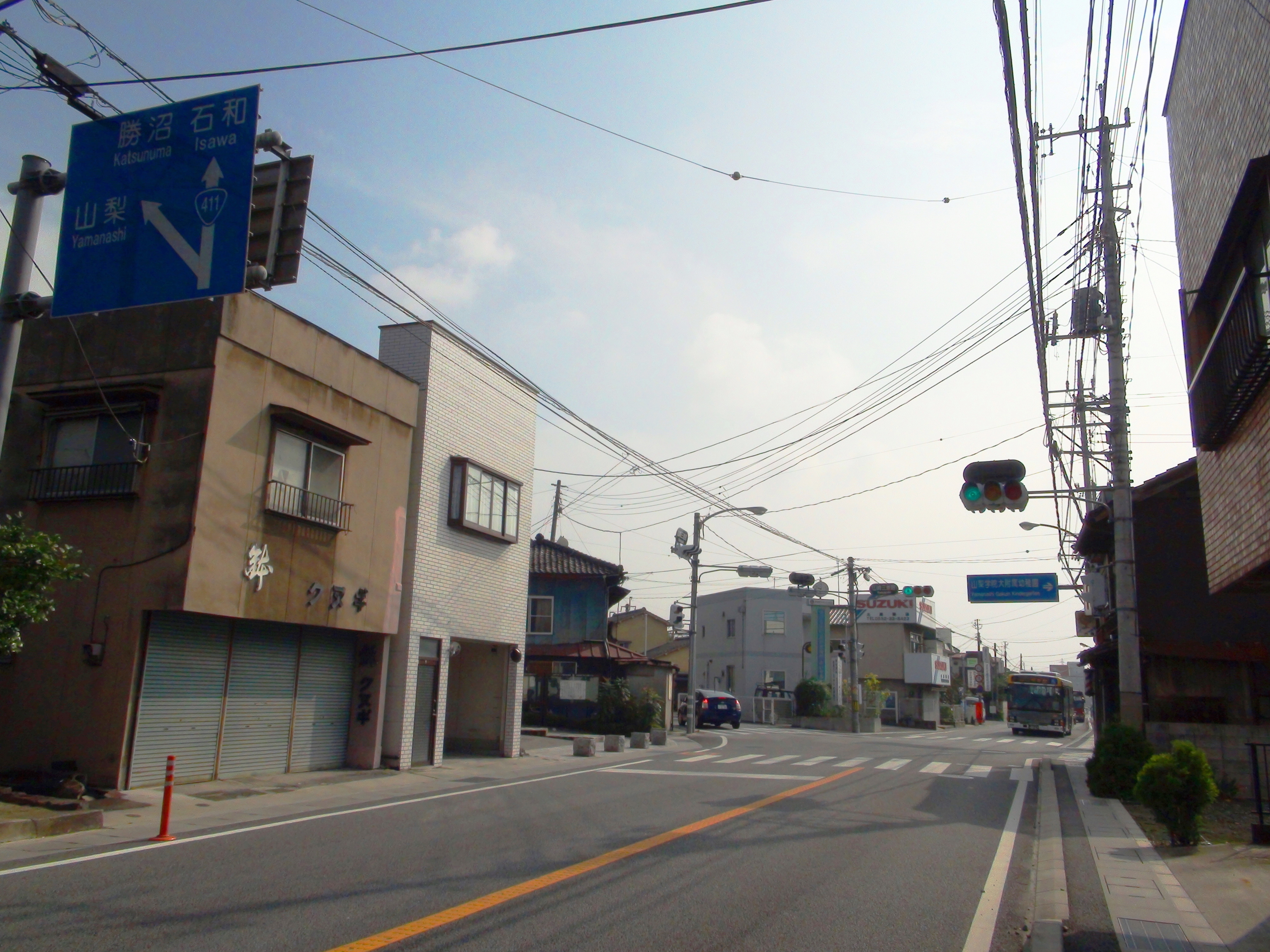
Western terminus of Ōme-kaidō in Kōfu

Ōme-kaidō Avenue (青梅街道) is one of the main roads leading westwards out of Tokyo. It begins in Shinjuku Ward, passes through the city of Ōme, and ends in the city of Kōfu, in Yamanashi Prefecture.

The road was originally developed in 1606 to transport lime from Ōme during the land reclamation efforts in Edo during the Tokugawa era and was known by different names in different eras and regions over the course of time, as "Ogawa-michi" and "Hakonegasaki-michi" in Edo, "Afume-michi" or "Mitake-michi" in Ōme, and "Haraedo-michi" in Hakonegasaki. It was identified as Ōme-kaidō on a survey map created in 1880 and formally designated as such in 1962.

== Ōme-kaidō Overbridge ==
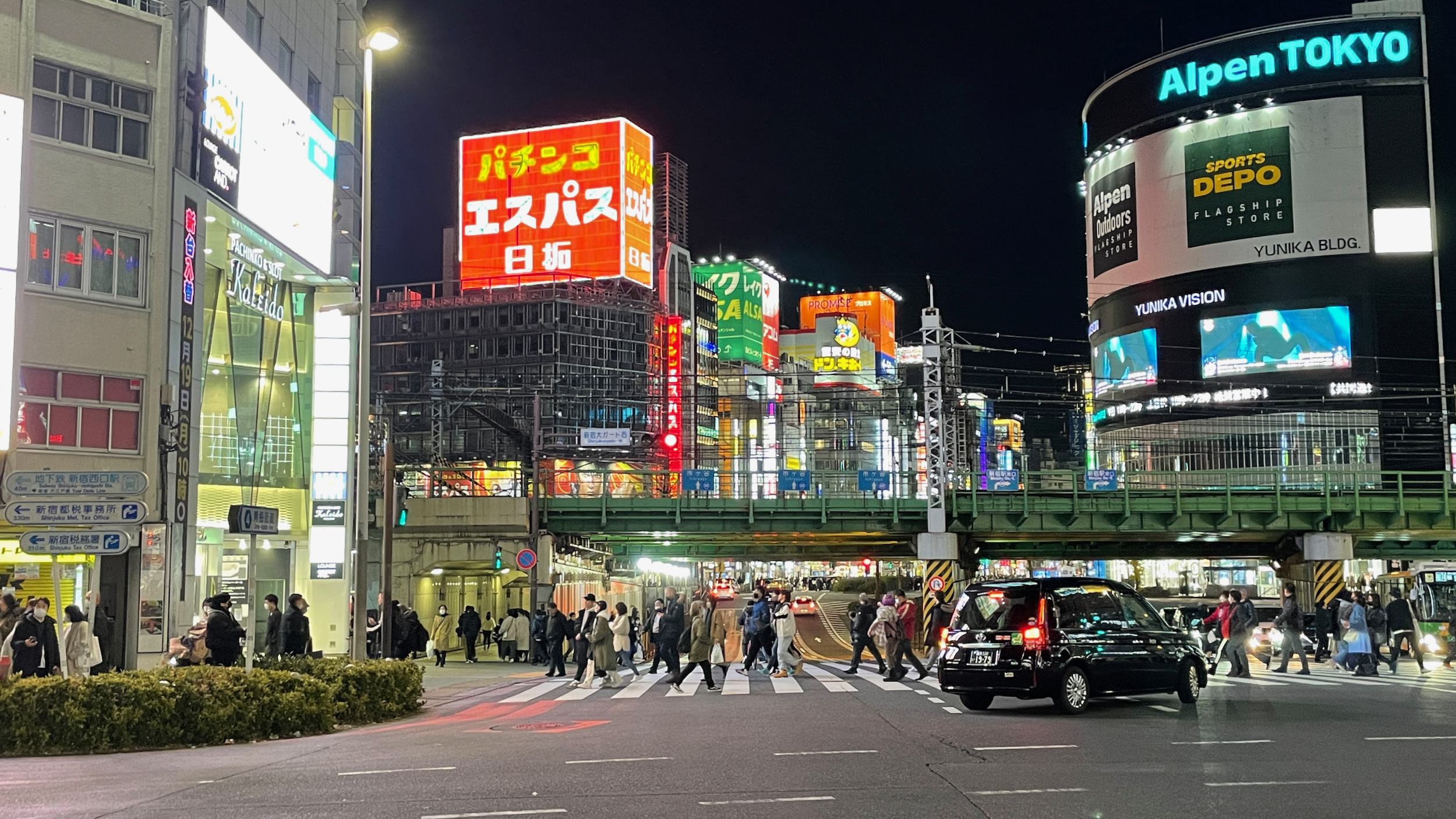
The bridge over Ōme-kaidō Ave. looking east towards Kabukichō.

The Ōme-kaidō overbridge in Shinjuku Ward currently serves as the eastern terminus of the Ōme-kaidō, approximately 560 m (1,840 ft) northwest of the historical starting point at the intersection of Meiji-dōri and Shinjuku-dōri.

The Chuō, Saikyō, Shōnan-Shinjuku, and Yamanote train lines pass over the highway, with 10 lanes of roadway and sidewalks beneath.

It is frequently featured in popular culture as the unofficial western gate to Kabukichō, most recently featured in the opening titles of Midnight Diner on Netflix.

== Stations of the Ōme-kaidō Avenue ==
There are 9 post stations along the Ōme-kaidō Avenue. They are listed below with the corresponding modern-day municipality listed in parentheses.

- Nakano-juku（Nakano, Tokyo）
- Tanashi-juku（Nishitōkyō, Tokyo）
- Ogawa-juku（Kodaira, Tokyo）
- Hakonegasaki-juku（Mizuho, Nishitama District, Tokyo）
- Ōme-juku（Ōme, Tokyo）
- Hikawa-shuku（Okutama, Nishitama District, Tokyo）
- Taba-shuku（Tabayama, Kitatsuru District, Yamanashi）
- Enzan-juku（Kōshū, Yamanashi)
- Kobara-juku（Yamanashi, Yamanashi)
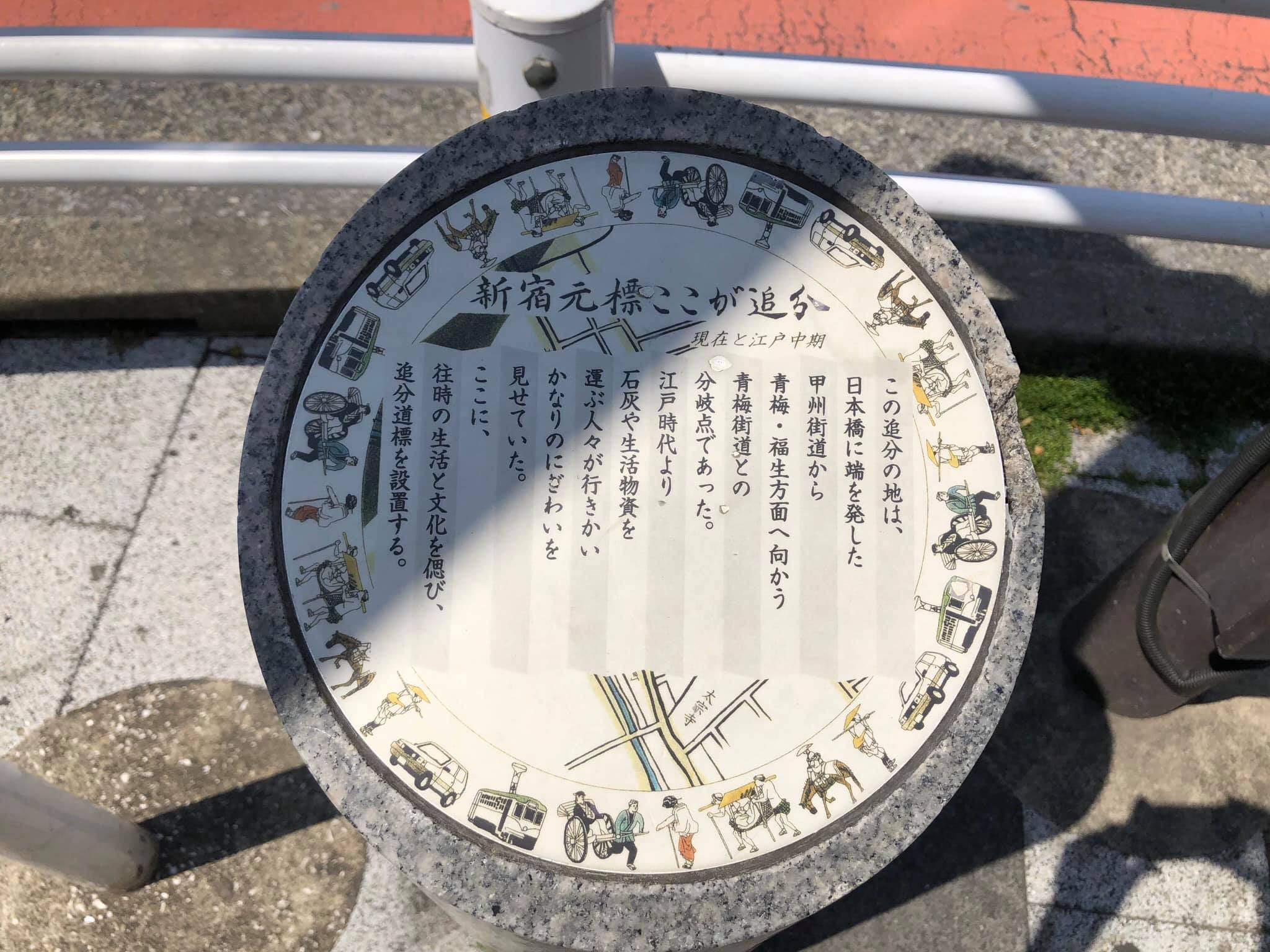
Marker indicating the historic starting point of Ōme-kaidō at Meiji-dōri and Shinjuku-dōri

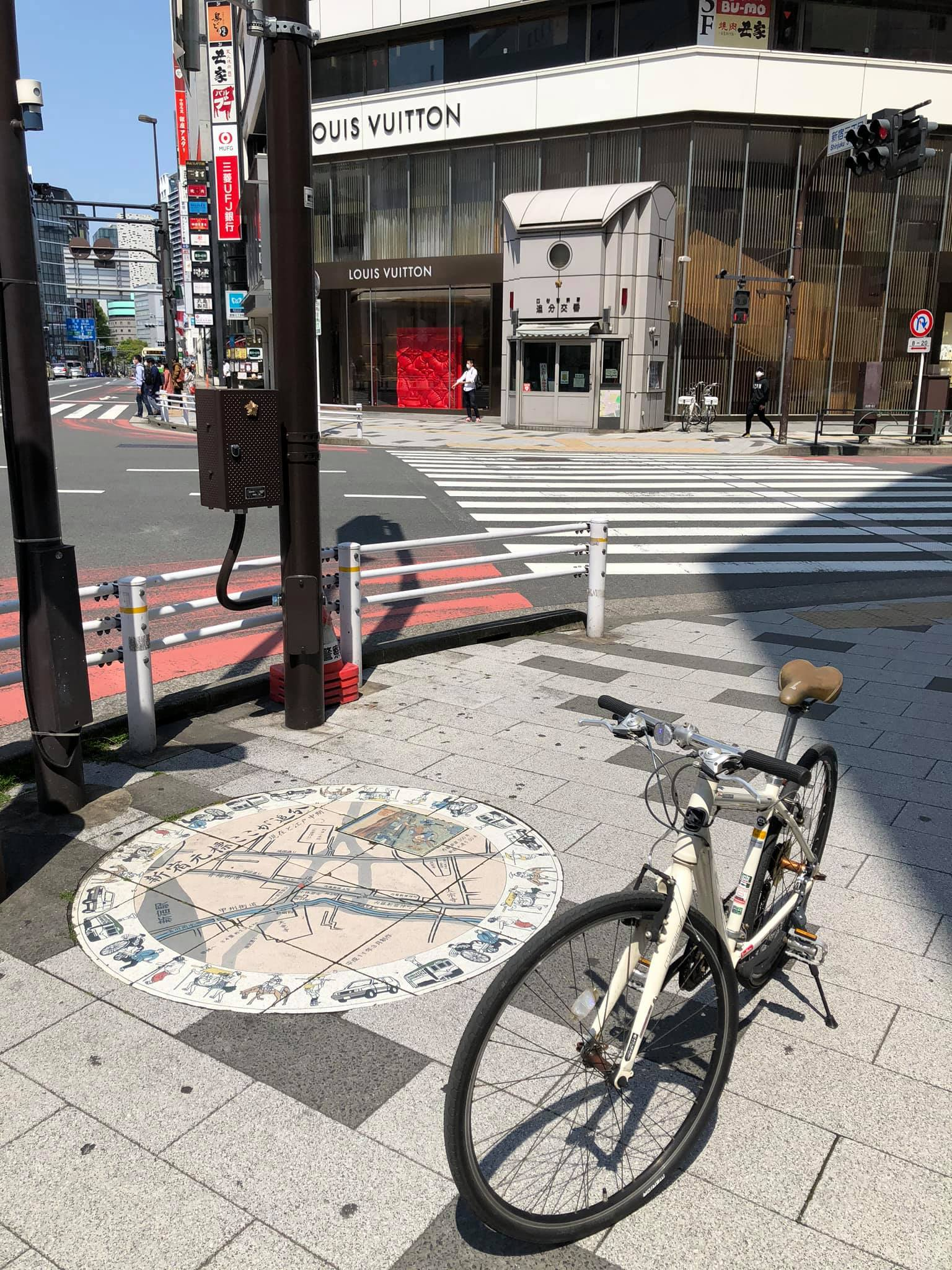
Historic starting point of Ōme-kaidō at Meiji-dōri and Shinjuku-dōri

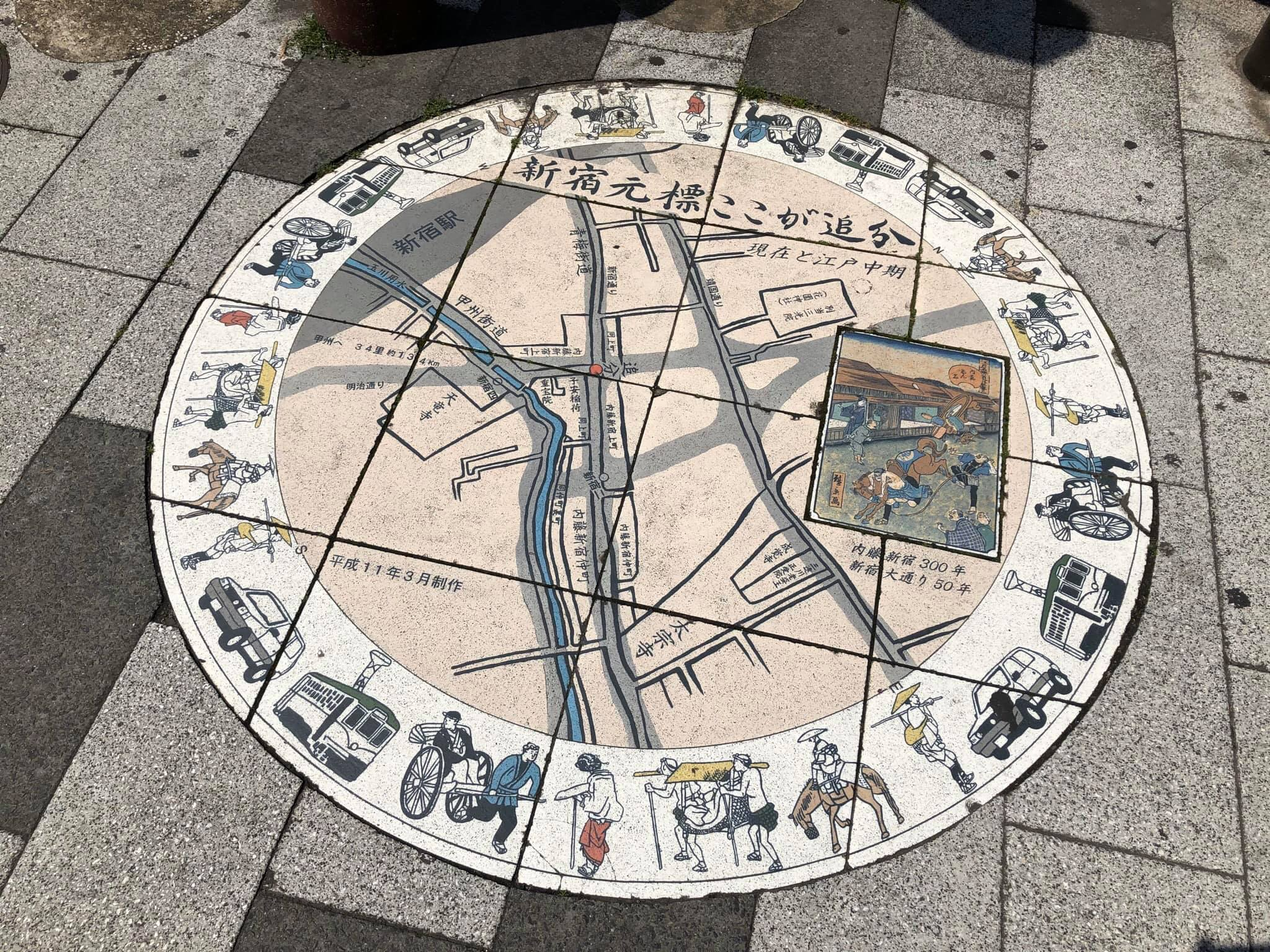
Closer view of the map at the historic starting point of Ōme-kaidō

== See also ==
- Itsukaichi Kaidō
- Edo Five Routes
  - Tōkaidō (or 53 Stations of the Tōkaidō)
  - Nakasendō (or 69 Stations of the Nakasendō)
  - Ōshū Kaidō
  - Nikkō Kaidō
