= Kōyama, Nerima =

Kōyama 向山
- Neighborhood (町丁)
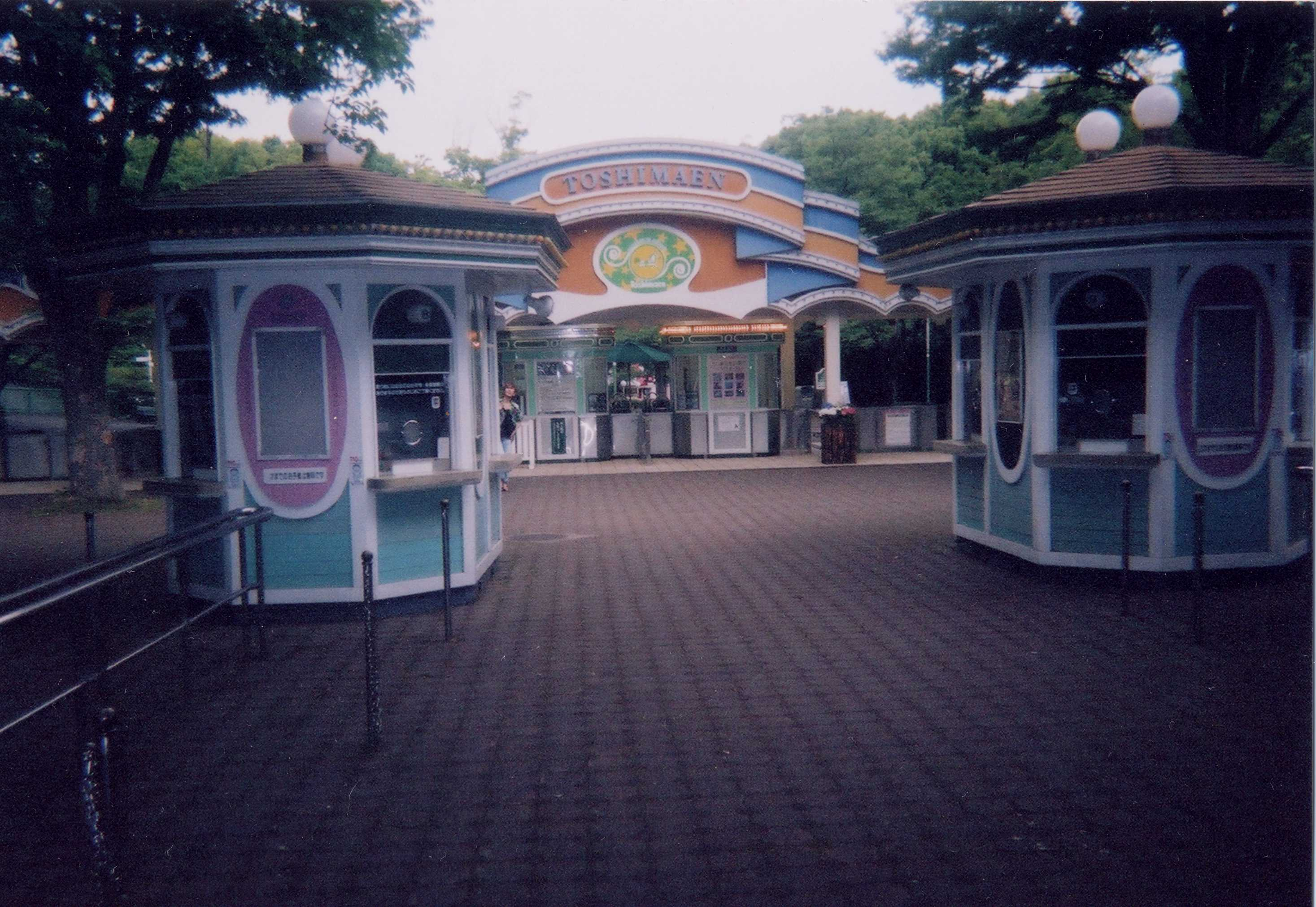
- Former Toshimaen entrance in Kōyama

- Location of Kōyama within the Wards Area of Tokyo
- Coordinates: 35°44′28.34″N 139°38′31.81″E
- Country: Japan
- Metropolis: Tokyo
- Ward: Nerima

Area
  - Total: 0.754 km^{2} (0.291 sq mi)

Population (April 1, 2025)
  - Total: 11,003
- Time zone: UTC+9 (JST)
- Zip code: 176-0022
- Area code: 03

Kōyama (向山) is a neighborhood located in the south-eastern part of Nerima Ward, Tokyo, Japan. The residential address system was implemented on 1 April 1965, and the current administrative names go from Kōyama 1st Street to 4th Street (丁目, chōme).

== Geography ==
Kōyama borders the neighborhoods Kasugachō, Nakamura-Kita, Nerima, Nukui, and Takamatsu. The area is home to the former site of the Toshimaen amusement park (now Nerima-jōshi Park), with the Shakujii River flowing eastward through the former park grounds. The Seibu Ikebukuro Line and Mejiro-dōri Avenue (Tokyo Metropolitan Route 8) pass through the neighborhood

The nearest train stations are Toshimaen Station (Seibu Toshima Line and Toei Ōedo Line), Nakamurabashi Station, and Nerima Station.

Kōyama Park, located in this neighborhood, is notable for being the setting of Yutaka Ozaki's hit debut single "15 no Yoru" (15の夜).

== Toponym ==
The name Kōyama, historically pronounced Mukōyama, literally means facing mountain/hill. The prevalent theory holds that the area was named because it lay directly across the Shakujii River when looking out from Nerima Castle (now Nerima-jōshi Park).

== History ==
During the Muromachi period, the area was the site of Nerima Castle, a 14th-century fortification held by the Toshima clan (located in today's Nerima-jōshi Park). During the Edo period, the area was the Mukōyama hamlet of Kami-Nerima Village in Toshima District, Musashi Province. Following the establishment of the modern municipal system in 1889, it became part of the ōaza (major section) of Kami-Nerima, divided into sub-districts (aza) like Higashi-Kōyama, Nishi-Kōyama, Kita-Kōyama, and Kōyamagayato (向山ヶ谷戸).

From the Taishō era to the early Shōwa era, a residential development project called Jōnan-jūtaku (城南住宅) was created south of Toshimaen, settled heavily by migrants from Yamagata Prefecture.

In September 1926, the Toshimaen amusement park opened on the former grounds of Nerima Castle. Upon the establishment of Itabashi Ward in 1932, the surrounding area became Nerima-Kōyamachō, which was shortened to Kōyamachō on January 1, 1949. On April 1, 1965, the official residential address system was enforced, giving rise to the modern districts of Kōyama 1st Street through 4th Street.
