= Nerima, Nerima =

Nerima 練馬
- Neighborhood (町丁)
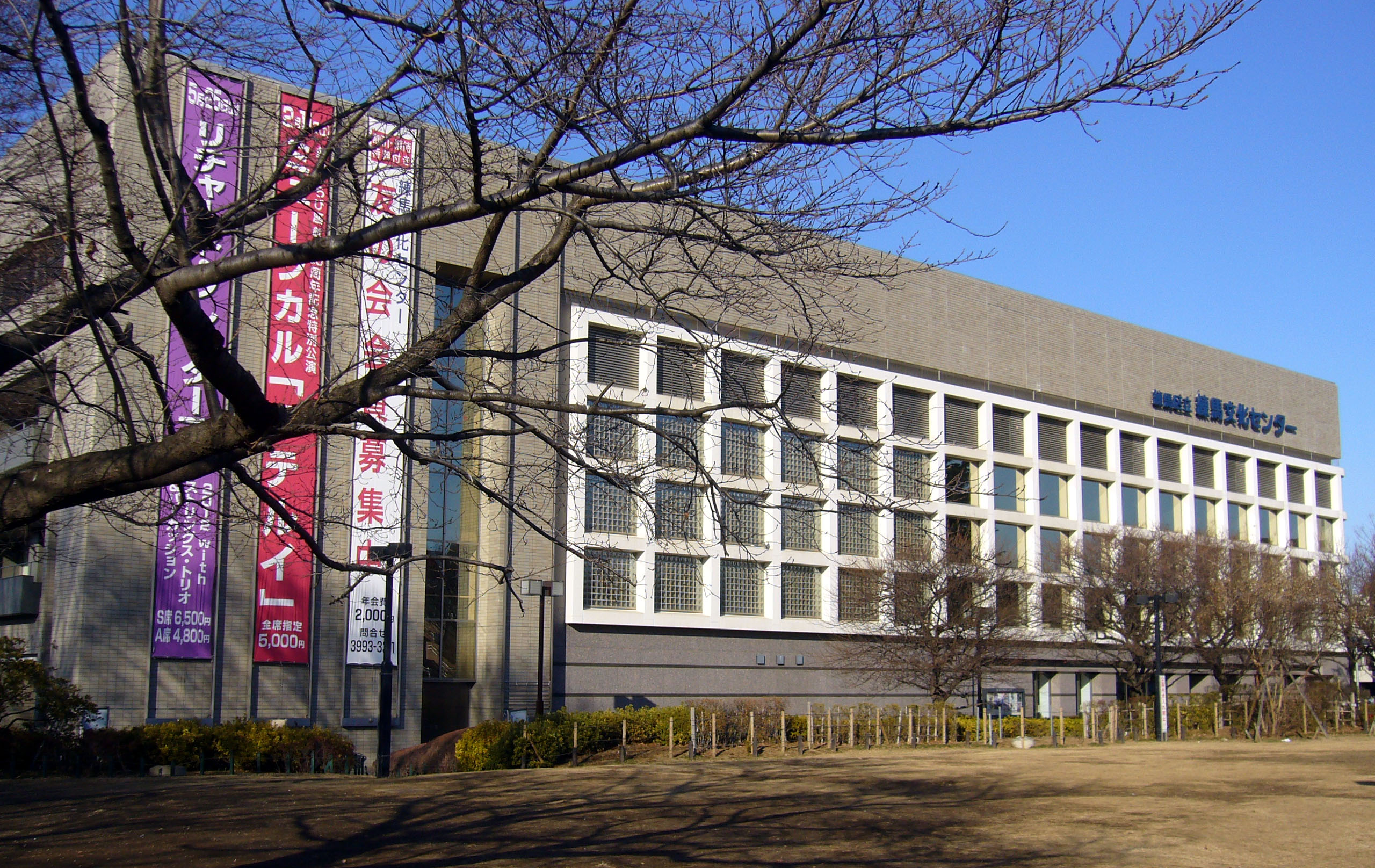
- Nerima Cultural Center

- Location of Nerima within the Wards Area of Tokyo
- Coordinates: 35°44′32″N 139°39′06″E
- Country: Japan
- Region: Kantō
- Metropolis: Tokyo
- Ward: Nerima

Area
  - Total: 0.794 km^{2} (0.307 sq mi)

Population (December 1, 2017)
  - Total: 14,823
  - Density: 18,668.77/km^{2} (48,351.9/sq mi)
- Time zone: UTC+9 (JST)
- Zip code: 176-0001
- Area code: 03

Nerima is the name of a neighborhood in Nerima Ward, Tokyo. The residential address system was implemented on February 1, 1963, and its current administrative names go from Nerima 1st Street to Nerima 4th Street. Nerima Station is located in Nerima 1st Street.

== Geography ==
The neighborhood is located slightly towards the east of the center of Nerima Ward. It borders the neighborhoods Hayamiya to the north, Nakamura-Kita, Toyotama-Kita, and Toyotama-Kami to the south, Sakuradai to the east, and Kōyama to the west.

== Name ==
Even though it was formerly part of the village of Shimo-Nerima (下練馬村, Shimo-nerima-mura) in the Toshima District of Musashi Province, the neighborhood's name derives from Nerima Station.

== History ==
=== Early and Medieval History ===
- Mid-8th Century: The region was host to Norinoma Station (乗潴駅, Norinoma-eki), an ancient post station along the official highway network of Musashi Province. Local historical theories place the station around the present-day Nerima Hakusan Shrine.
- 1083 (Eihō 3): According to local tradition, Minamoto no Yoshiie planted a Japanese zelkova tree at the Hakusan Shrine on his way to the Later Three Years' War. The tree survives today as the designated Great Zelkova of Nerima Hakusan Shrine.
- 1281 (Kōan 4): Archaeological evidence, including Itabi (stone stupas) excavated around Hakusan Shrine dating to this year, confirms early village development in the area during the Kamakura period.

=== Modern Development ===
During the Edo period and early Meiji period, the area was part of Shimo-Nerima Village (下練馬村) within Toshima District, Musashi Province. Following various administrative re-organizations under the early Meiji government (including temporary administration under Shinagawa Prefecture), it was incorporated into Tokyo Prefecture on January 14, 1872.

- April 15, 1915: Musashino Railway (now the Seibu Ikebukuro Line) opened Nerima Station, drastically accelerating urbanization.
- October 10, 1919: The Dainippon Cotton Spinning (later Kanebo) Nerima Plant began operations north of Nerima Station, serving as a primary industrial landmark for decades.
- October 15, 1927: Toshima Station (now Toshimaen Station) opened on the Musashino Railway Toshima Line.
- October 1, 1932: Upon the expansion of Tokyo City and creation of Itabashi Ward, the neighborhood was formally designated as Nerima-Minamichō (練馬南町).
- August 1, 1947: Nerima Ward was carved out of Itabashi Ward as an independent special ward, and the district was re-divided into Minamichō 3rd Street through 5th Street.

=== Address System Implementation ===
On February 1, 1963, the neighborhood officially adopted the modern Japanese address system (住居表示, jūkyo hyōji) and was renamed Nerima, structured from 1st Street to 4th Street. This marked the first implementation of the modern standardized residential address formatting in the entire Metropolis of Tokyo.

=== Post-Industrial Redevelopment ===
Following the closure of the Kanebo Nerima Plant around December 1970, the land north of Nerima Station was acquired jointly by Tokyo Metropolis and Nerima Ward in 1977. The site was subsequently redeveloped into major public facilities:

- April 3, 1983: Nerima Cultural Center opened on the former mill site.
- April 15, 1994: Heisei Tsutsuji Park (azalea garden) opened adjacent to the cultural center.
- December 10, 1991: Toei Oedo Line extended to Toshimaen Station, followed by connections to Nerima Station in 1997.

== Demographics ==
According to public demographic data published by Nerima Ward, the population and number of households as of April 1, 2025 are as follows:

Street	Households	Population
Nerima 1st Street	2,860	4,222
Nerima 2nd Street	1,826	3,030
Nerima 3rd Street	2,539	3,724
Nerima 4th Street	2,326	3,847
Total	9,551	14,823

== Landmarks and Notable Places ==
- Nerima Station (1st Street): Major transit hub operated by Seibu Railway and Toei Subway.
- Nerima Cultural Center (1st Street): A major public concert hall and arts center.
- Heisei Tsutsuji Park (1st Street): Public park famous for housing over 600 varieties of azalea plants.
- Nerima Hakusan Shrine (4th Street): Historic Shinto shrine home to a centuries-old giant zelkova tree, designated as a natural monument.
- Tajima-san Jūichika-dera (4th Street): A complex of eleven Buddhist temples relocated together following the 1923 Great Kantō Earthquake.
- United Cinemas Toshimaen (4th Street): Cinema complex built on the site of the former Toshimaen bus terminal.

== Education ==
The local public school assignments for residents of Nerima neighborhood are administered by the Nerima City Board of Education:

- Public Elementary Schools: Assigned based on specific block numbers to either Nerima Ward Minamichō Elementary School (練馬区立南町小学校), Kaishin Second Elementary School (開進第二小学校), or Kōyama Elementary School (向山小学校).
- Public Junior High School: All four street districts (chōme) are zoned to Nerima Ward Kaishin Second Junior High School (練馬区立開進第二中学校), located in Nerima 2nd Street.

== Transport ==
=== Railway ===
- Seibu Railway: Seibu Ikebukuro Line, Seibu Toshima Line, Seibu Yūrakuchō Line – Nerima Station (1st Street) & Toshimaen Station (4th Street).
- Toei Subway: Toei Ōedo Line – Nerima Station & Toshimaen Station.

=== Major Roads ===
- Tokyo Metropolitan Route 8 (Mejiro-dōri)
- Tokyo Metropolitan Route 439 (Senkawa-dōri)
- Tokyo Metropolitan Route 442 (Benten-dōri / Daimon-dōri)
