= Nerima (disambiguation) =

The Japanese name Nerima (練馬) may refer to:

- Nerima, a special ward of Tokyo, Japan
- Nerima, Nerima
- Nerima Castle
