= Nerima Castle =

Nerima Castle (練馬城)
- Kōyama, Nerima Ward, Tokyo, Japan
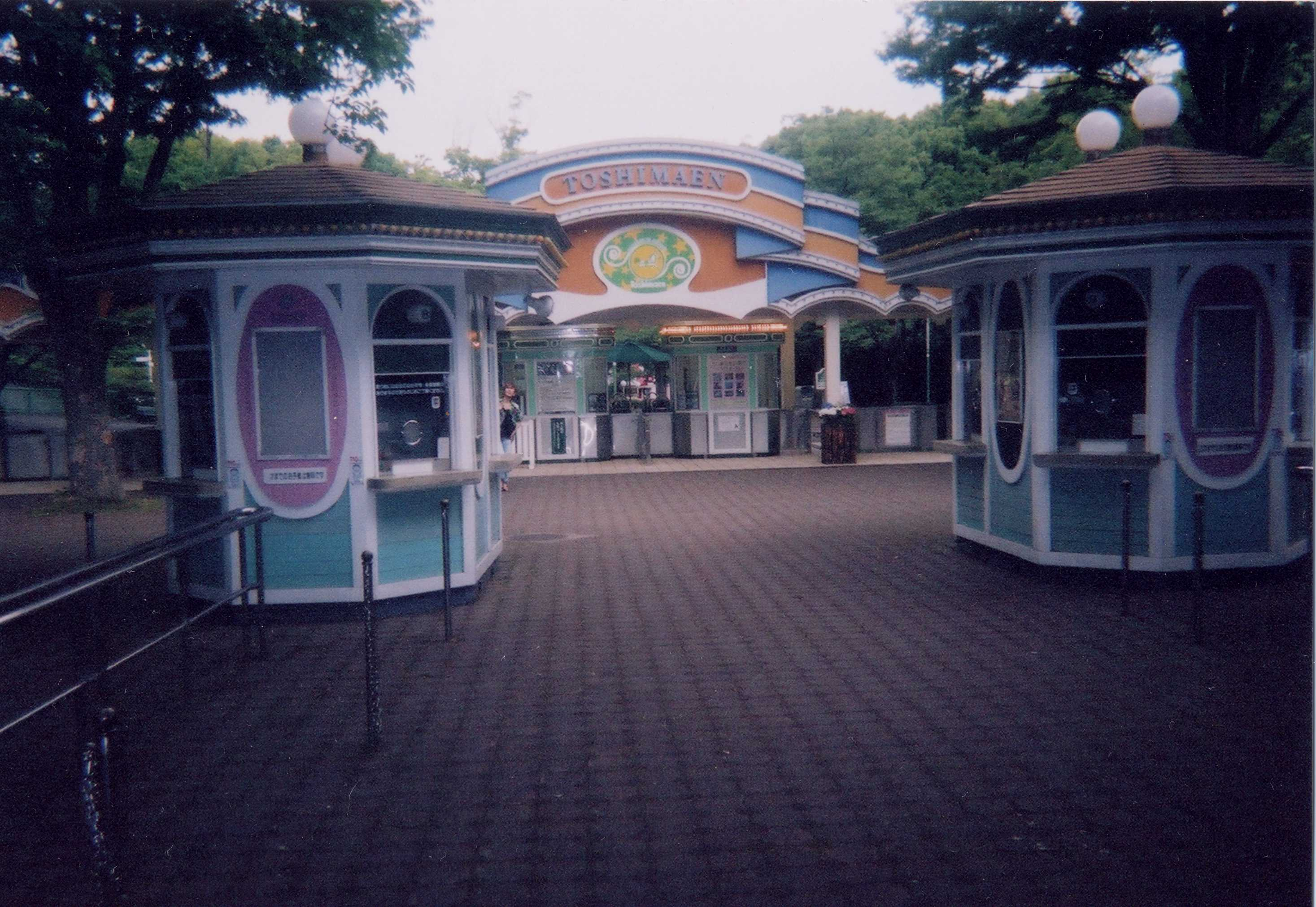
- Toshimaen, built on the former site of Nerima Castle

Site information
- Type: Flatland-hill castle
- Condition: None remaining; designated a Historic Site by Tokyo Metropolitan Government

Location
- Location within Tokyo Location within Japan
- Coordinates: 35°44′35″N 139°38′41″E

Site history
- Built: Unknown (Late 14th century?)
- Built by: Toshima Kagemura?
- Materials: Wood, earthworks
- Demolished: 1477
- Battles/wars: Battle of Egotahara-Numabukuro(1477)

Nerima Castle (練馬城, Nerima-jō) was a Muromachi period Japanese castle located in Kōyama, Nerima Ward, Tokyo.

In September 1926, site of the castle ruins became the amusement park Toshimaen, and following its closure, Nerima-jōshi Park was opened on May 1, 2023.

== History ==
Although the exact period of its construction is unknown, it is believed to have been built around the end of the 14th century by the Toshima clan as a satellite fortress to Shakujii Castle. A local figure named Yano Shōgen (矢野将監) was said to have resided here at an unknown period, leading the site to be called Yano Residence (矢野屋敷) or Yano Mountain Castle (矢野山城). Additionally, legend holds that another figure named Ebina Sakon (海老名左近) later built a residence at this site or in the northern valley. In the Toshima Myōji no Shokutate (豊島名字之書立) the names Nerima Hyōgo (練馬兵庫) and Nerima Yajirō (ねりま弥次郎) appear as members of the Toshima family, though their exact relationship to Nerima Castle remains unclear. Toshimaen, which closed on August 31, 2020, was originally opened as a castle ruins park equipped with play facilities before being developed into a full amusement park, and its name was derived from the Toshima clan.

During the Nagao Kageharu Rebellion that broke out in 1476, the Toshima clan aligned themselves with Nagao Kageharu (長尾景春) to fight against both the Yamanouchi and Ōgigayatsu branches of the Uesugi clan. Situated between Edo Castle and Kawagoe Castle (both held by the Uesugi side), Nerima Castle worked alongside the nearby Toshima stronghold of Shakujii Castle to sever communications between the two Uesugi fortresses.

On April 13, 1477, Ōta Dōkan, chief retainer of the Ōgigayatsu Uesugi clan, set out from Edo Castle, shot arrows into Nerima Castle, and set fire to the surrounding area. Seeing this, the lord of Nerima Castle, Toshima Yasuaki (豊島泰明), contacted his elder brother Toshima Yasutsune (豊島泰経) at Shakujii Castle, (Note: Regarding the names Yasutsune and Yasuaki, contemporary records only refer to them by their official titles Kageyu-saemon-no-jō (勘解由左衛門尉) and Hei-zaemon-no-jō (平右衛門尉), leaving it uncertain if they were actually called by those personal names.) and sorties were launched with their full force. Dōkan turned back to intercept them, leading to an engagement at Egotahara (Note: In the Kamakura Ōsōshi (鎌倉大草紙), it is referred to as "Egotahara-Numabukuro" (江古田原沼袋).) (the Battle of Egota-Numabukuro). In the battle, the Toshima side suffered heavy casualties including Yasuaki and dozens of others, (Note: The Kamakura Ōsōshi states that "150 men including members of the Itabashi and Akatsuka clans were killed in action.") forcing the surviving Yasutsune and his remaining troops to retreat to Shakujii Castle.

A prevailing theory regarding this battle suggests that Dōkan had placed ambushes near Egotahara in advance, sent a small force to provoke the Toshima troops, and lured them out into the open terrain. The exact fate of Nerima Castle immediately after the battle is unclear, but it is believed to have been abandoned after its commander fell and the garrison retreated to Shakujii Castle. While older historical consensus held that Hiratsuka Castle (平塚城) was the first castle attacked by Dōkan, the current prevailing consensus identifies Nerima Castle as his initial target.
