= Nerima-kasugachō Station =

Metro station in Tokyo, Japan

Coordinates: 35.7517°N 139.6400°E

Nerima-kasugachō Station 練馬春日町駅

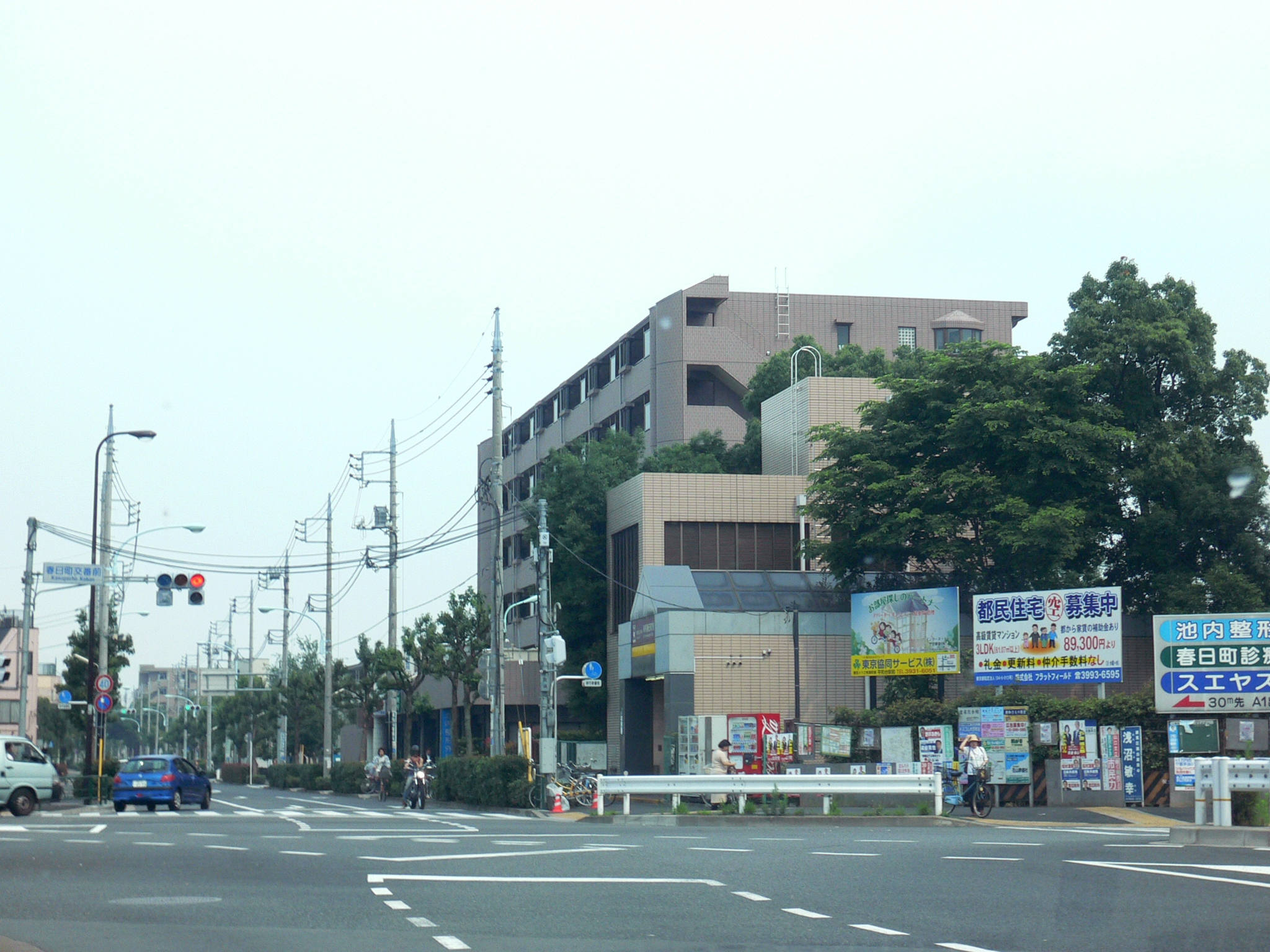

General information
- Location: 3-29-25 Kasuga-cho, Nerima City, Tokyo; Japan
- Operator: Toei Subway
- Line: Ōedo Line
- Platforms: 1 island platform
- Tracks: 2

Construction
- Structure type: Underground
- Accessible: Yes

Other information
- Station code: E-37

History
- Opened: 10 December 1991; 34 years ago

Services
Preceding station	Toei Subway	Following station
Hikarigaoka Terminus	Ōedo Line	Toshimaen towards Tochōmae
Location
- Location within Special wards of Tokyo Location within Tokyo Bay and Bōsō Peninsula Location within Tokyo Location within Japan

Nerima-kasugachō Station (練馬春日町駅, Nerima-kasugachō-eki) is a subway station on the Toei Ōedo Line in Nerima, Tokyo, Japan, operated by Tokyo subway operator Toei Subway. Its station number is E-37.

== Lines ==
- Toei Ōedo Line

== Station layout ==
Nerima-kasugachō Station is composed of one island platform serving two tracks.

=== Platforms ===
1	Ōedo Line	for Tochōmae, Roppongi, and Daimon
2	Ōedo Line	for Hikarigaoka

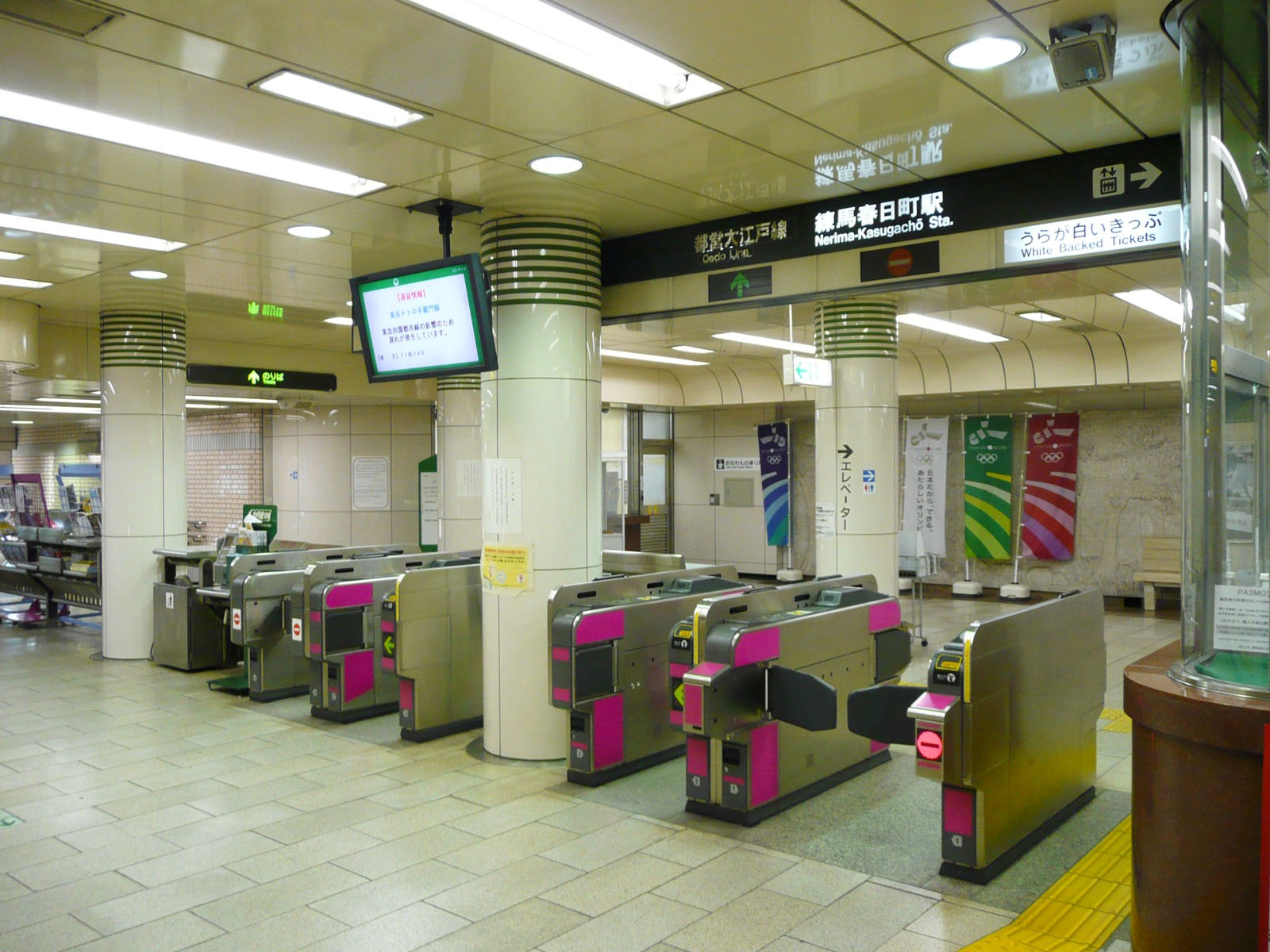
Ticket gates

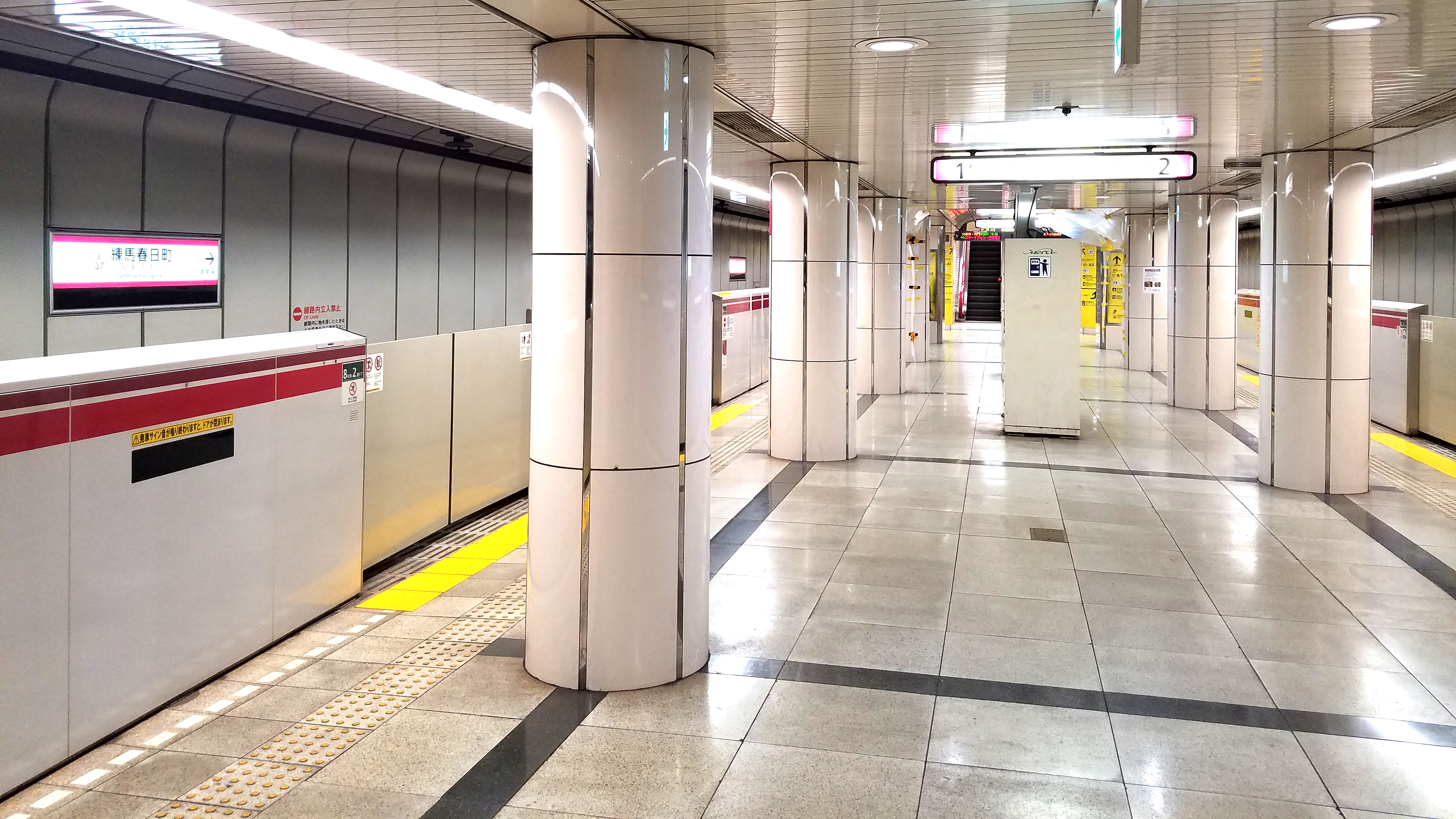
Platforms

== History ==
Nerima-kasugachō Station opened on 10 December 1991.

== Surrounding area ==
- Aizenin Kannon-ji Temple
