= Shakujii Park =

Park in Tokyo, Japan

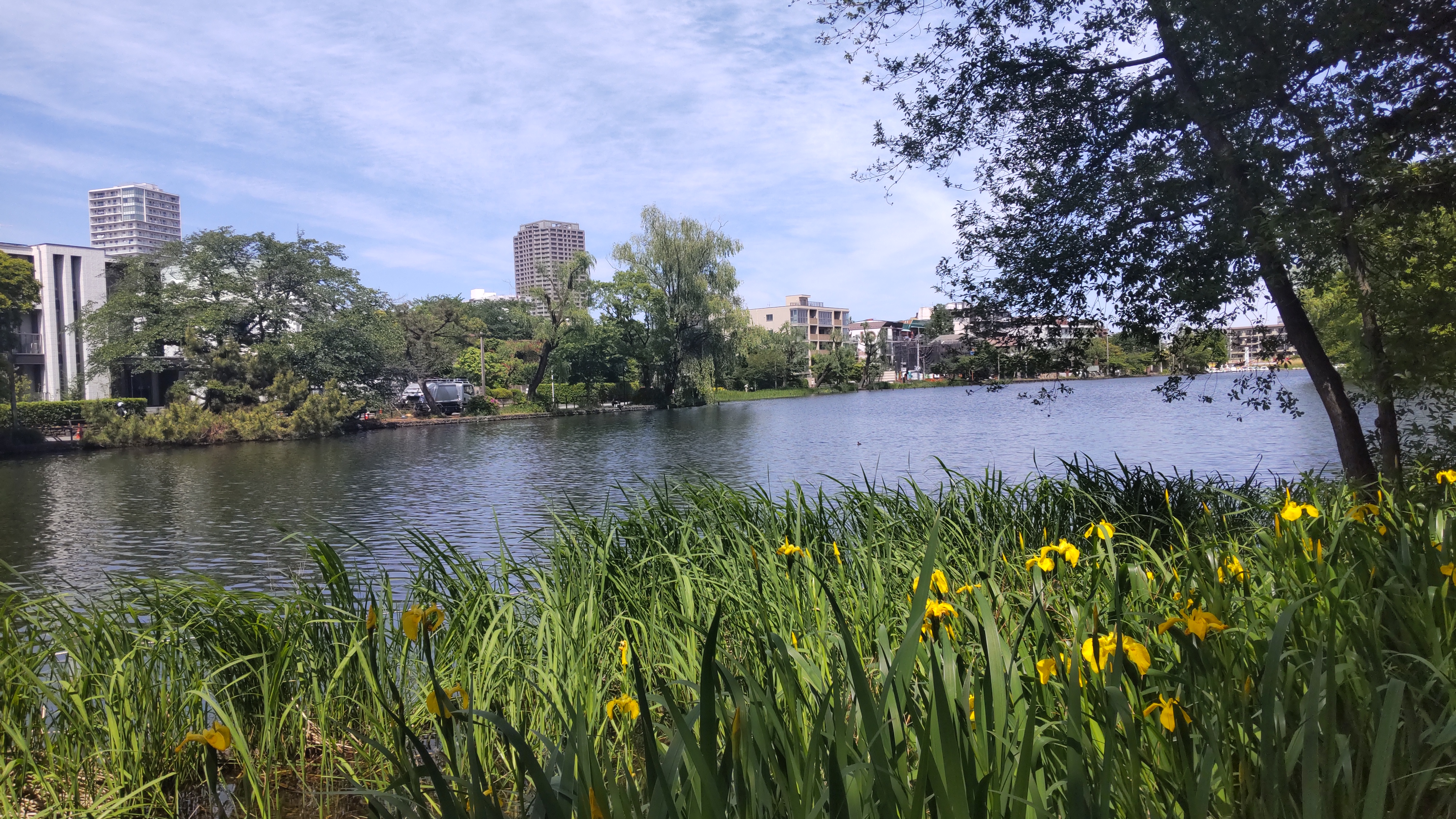
- Interactive map of Shakujii Park
- Location: Nerima, Tokyo, Japan
- Coordinates: 35°44′20″N 139°35′51″E
- Area: 223,785.57 square metres (55.29862 acres)
- Created: March 11, 1959

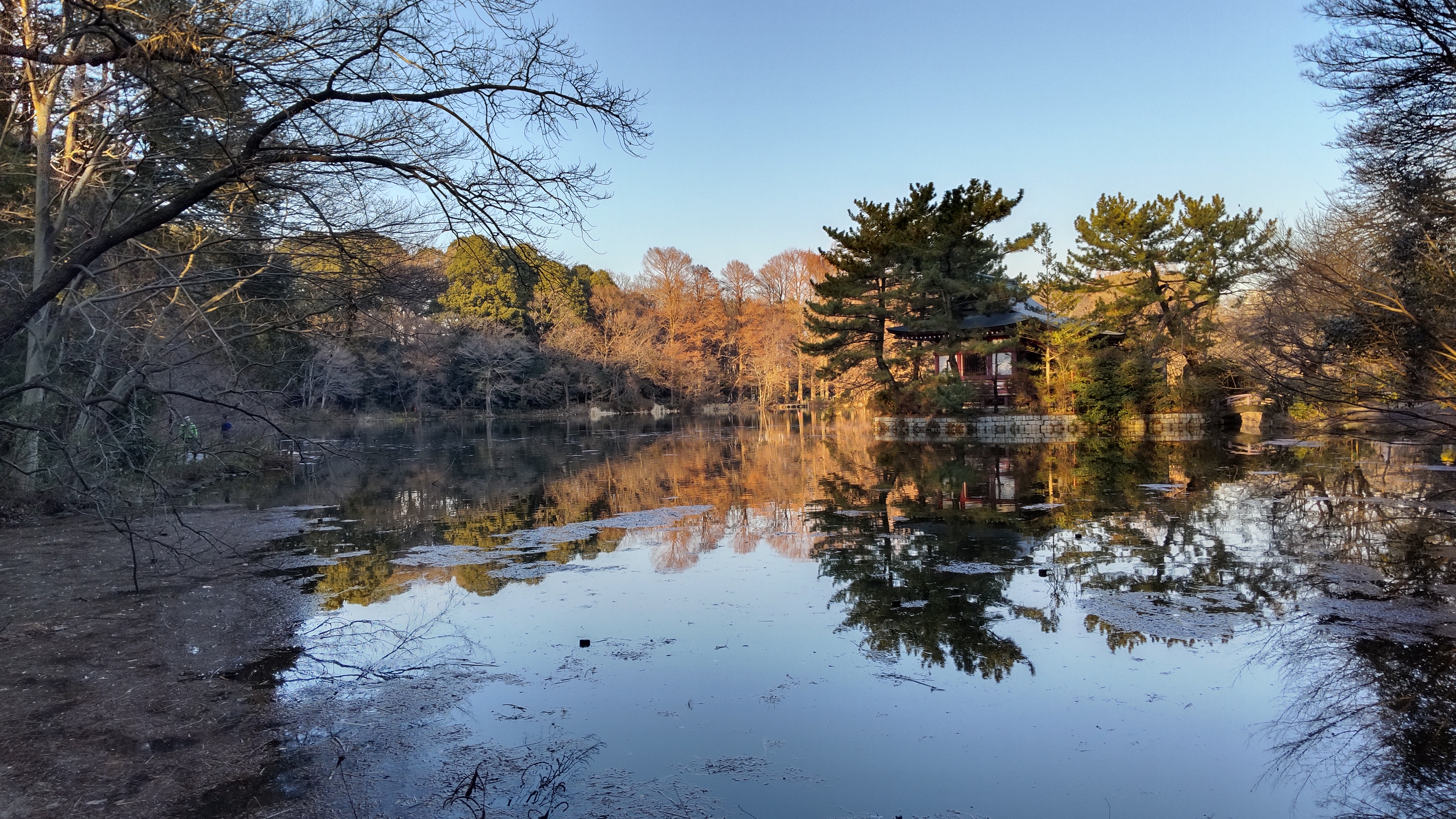
Sanpō-ji Pond

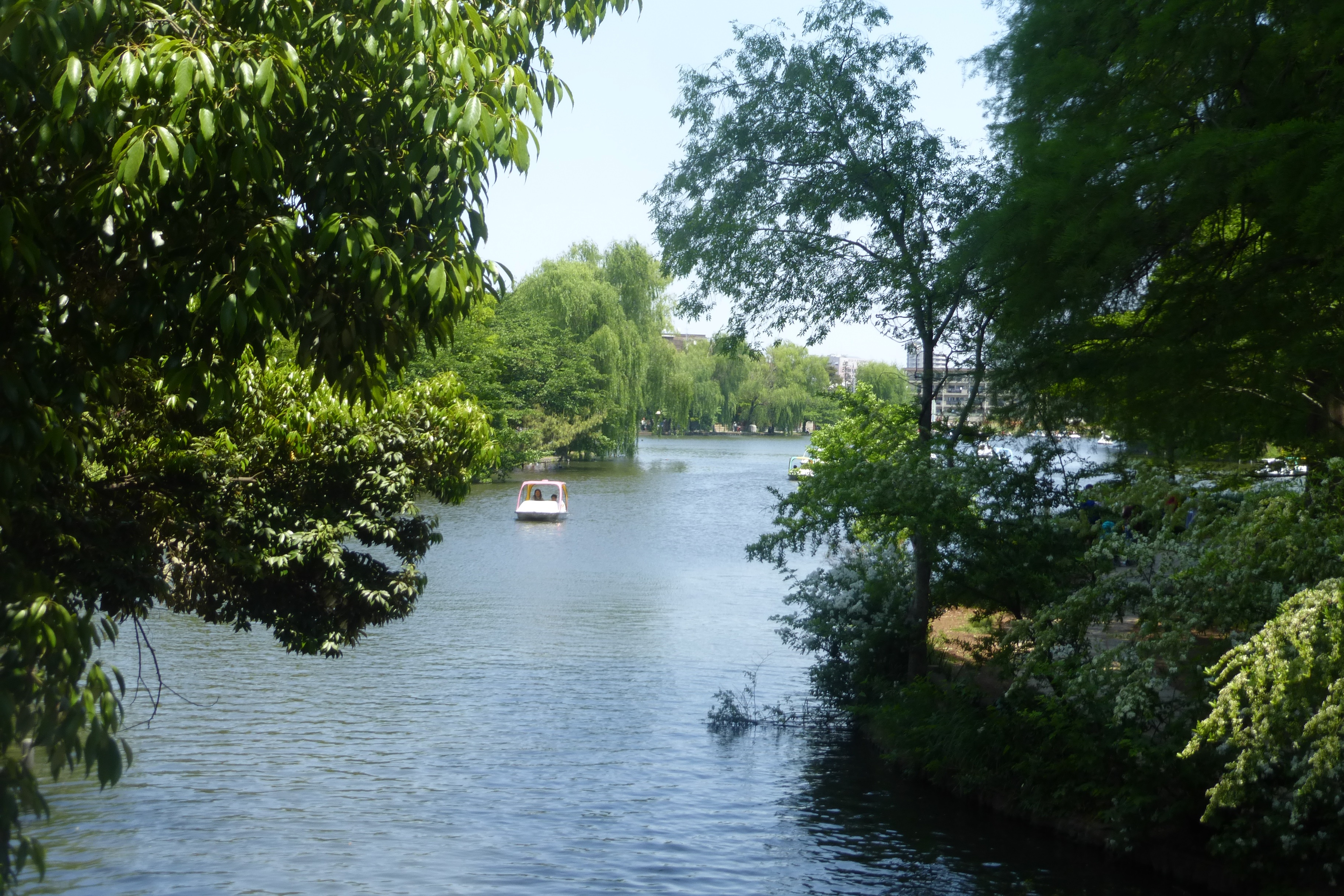
Shakujii Pond

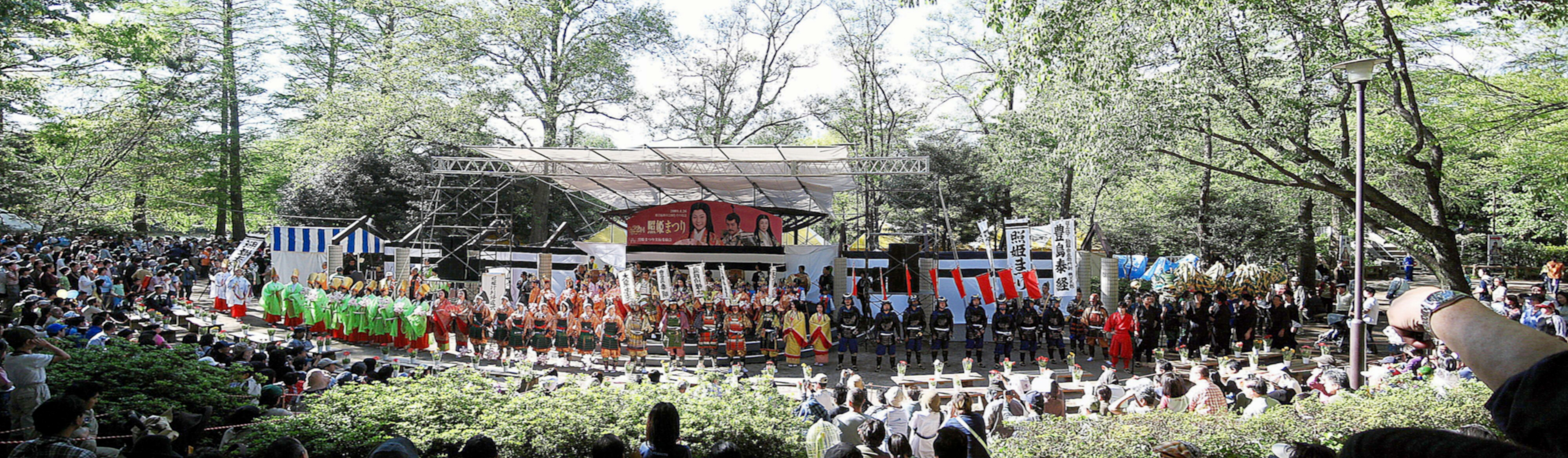
Teruhime festival

Shakujii Park (石神井公園, Shakujii Kōen) is a public park in the Japanese town of Shakujii, in Tokyo's Nerima ward. It is one of the larger parks in the metropolis. As of April 2006, the site is managed directly by the Tokyo Metropolitan Park Association, an arrangement which ended in March 2011.

The park contains within it two ponds, Sanpō-ji Pond and Shakujii Pond, several small Shintō shrines, and the remains of Shakujii castle. The Shakujii River runs east-west a short ways south of the park. The ponds are said to have formed naturally from the gushing up of underground water from the Musashino-dai Pond a short distance away. Over the years, however, the ponds have slowly shrunk, and so, in order to preserve the park's scenery and its recreational use, manmade systems have been installed to pump water into the ponds.

The castle ruins date from the Kamakura period (1185–1333), or earlier, and thus it is known that the site was in use, and regarded as strategically important, for many centuries. The castle was the residence of the Toshima clan of samurai, who ruled over the surrounding area in the 14th–15th centuries. The clan's destruction came largely at the hands of Ōta Dōkan, who was responsible for the construction of Edo castle; many of the ruins and shrines in the area are associated with him.

In the twentieth century, it came to be a popular site for birdwatching, strolling, and relaxation, and was formally established as a public park in 1959.

In addition to being popular with local residents, the park is fairly well known throughout Tokyo. Shakujii Pond is a popular location for TV programs and films to shoot boating scenes, and the park, or its ponds, is often seen in manga, anime, and other productions of popular culture. Rumiko Takahashi's Ranma ½ takes place in Nerima ward, and there are a number of episodes of the manga/anime in which the characters visit the park. In addition, Kazutoshi Sakurai, of the Japanese band Mr. Children, is said to have conceived of the lyrics to the band's song "Tomorrow never knows" while jogging there.

== Access ==
Shakujii-kōen Station on the Seibu Ikebukuro Line is located to the north of the park.
