= Toshima clan =

Toshima
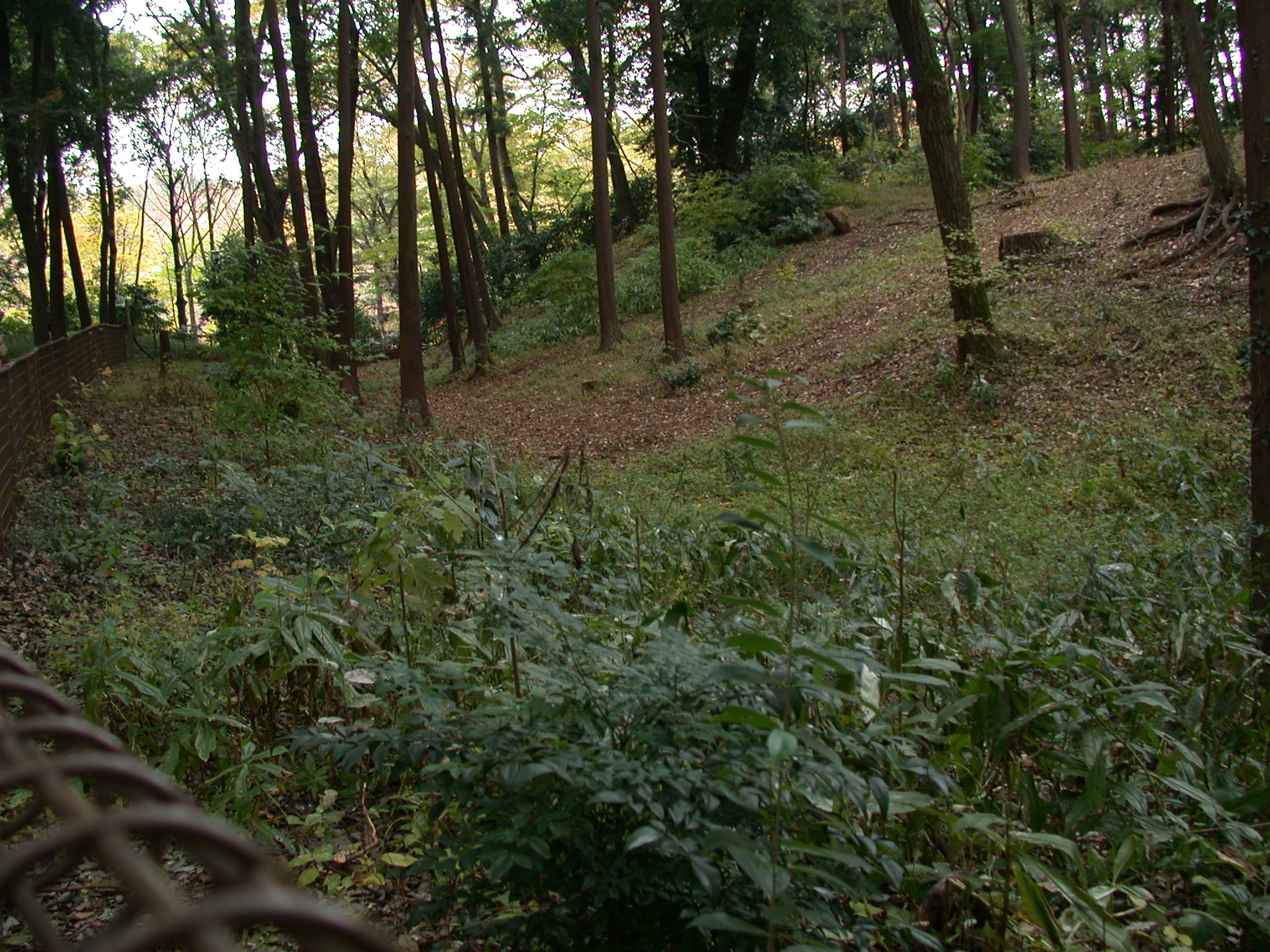
- Site of Shakujii castle, Kamakura/Muromachi-era seat of the Toshima family's territory
- Pronunciation: Toshima

Origin
- Origin: Japanese
- Region of origin: Japanese

The Toshima clan (豊島氏 or 豊嶋氏, Toshima-shi) was a Japanese samurai clan prominent in the Kamakura and Muromachi periods of Japanese history in the northwest of what is today Tokyo. The clan was based primarily in Shakujii castle, in what is today Shakujii Park in Nerima Ward, Tokyo, until the fall of the castle in the late 1470s to Ogigayatsu Uesugi clan vassal Ōta Dōkan.

== History ==
The clan made its chief seat of governance in the area around the Hiratsuka Shrine in what is today the Nakazato area of Tokyo's Kita Ward, and expanded their influence over the years to cover a much wider area, delegating much of it to branch families such as the Miyagi, Takinogawa, Shimura, and Itabashi clans. The Toshima obtained and moved into Shakujii towards the end of the Kamakura period (1185-1333).

In 1349, the Toshima clan established full control over Shakujii. However, after their defeat in the Hei-ikki Rebellion of 1368, their territory was confiscated by the Kanrei of the Kantō region, the Uesugi clan. It was not until 1395 that the domain was officially restored to them. From this, it is believed that the Toshima clan built Shakujii Castle and moved their base of operations around the end of the 14th century.

The clan's power and lineage solidified over the 13th-14th centuries. Though a number of clan heads had no direct male heir, for roughly one century from 1282 to 1395 the clan was supported by the Miyagi clan, with whom the Toshima shared territory and intermarried. Miyagi Tamenori was the son of Miyagi Masanori and a daughter of Toshima Shigehiro; Tamenori would in turn father 11th clan head Toshima Munetomo.

Following the death of ninth clan head Toshima Yasukage, on account of the minority of his son Toshima Tomoyasu, Yasukage's brother Toshima Kagemura took over as clan head. He expanded and solidified the clan's control over the districts of Toshima, Adachi, Tama, Niiza and Kodama. Toshima-san Dōjō-ji, which would later become the chief clan temple of the Toshima, was established in 1372 in a location adjacent to Shakujii castle by Kagemura's adopted son, Toshima Terutoki. Terutoki's birth father, Hōjō Tokiyuki, was hidden and protected at Shakujii during the Nakasendai Rebellion (1335) by Toshima Kagemura; since Kagemura lacked a male heir, Terutoki was adopted to succeed him as clan head. He died in 1375, and when his son Toshima Kagenori died in turn, leaving no heir, the position of clan head passed to Toshima Munetomo; as described above, Munetomo was related to the Miyagi family, and was of a different branch of the Toshima clan from the previous clan heads.

Another temple strongly associated with the clan, Sanbō-ji, was established to the east of Shakujii castle in 1394. It is said to have been moved to its current location on the edge of Sanbō-ji Pond, one of two ponds which form the center of modern-day Shakujii Park, by Ōta Dōkan, following the destruction of the Toshima clan by his hand in the late 1470s.

Thirteenth clan head Toshima Noriyasu led the clan in siding with Uesugi Norimoto, general of Ashikaga Mochiuji's forces, during the 1417 rebellion of Uesugi Zenshū. In the political and military conflicts surrounding the Kyōtoku Incident (1454-1482), the Toshima clan at first supported Ashikaga Shigeuji, but later switched sides to support Uesugi Fusaaki and Uesugi Akisada of the Yamanouchi branch of the Uesugi clan. During this time, Uesugi vassal Nagao Kageharu rebelled against the Uesugi clan and, along with the Ashikaga, sought to take control of the Kantō region. Toshima clan heads Toshima Yasutsune, lord of Shakujii and Nerima castles, and his brother Toshima Yasuaki, lord of Hiratsuka castle, sided with Kageharu, and were ultimately defeated by Uesugi vassal Ōta Dōkan, marking the demise of the clan.

== Clan heads ==
- Taketsune
- Tsuneie
- Yasuie
- Kiyomitsu (Kiyomoto)
- Tomotsune
- Aritsune
- Tsuneyasu
- Yasutomo
- Yasukage
- Tomoyasu
- Munetomo
- Yasumune
- Noriyasu
- Tomoyasu
- Yasukage
- Yasuyoshi (Yasunori?)
- Nobuyasu
- Tsunesuke?
- Yasuaki & Yasutsune
