= Toshimaen =

Former amusement park in Nerima, Tokyo, Japan

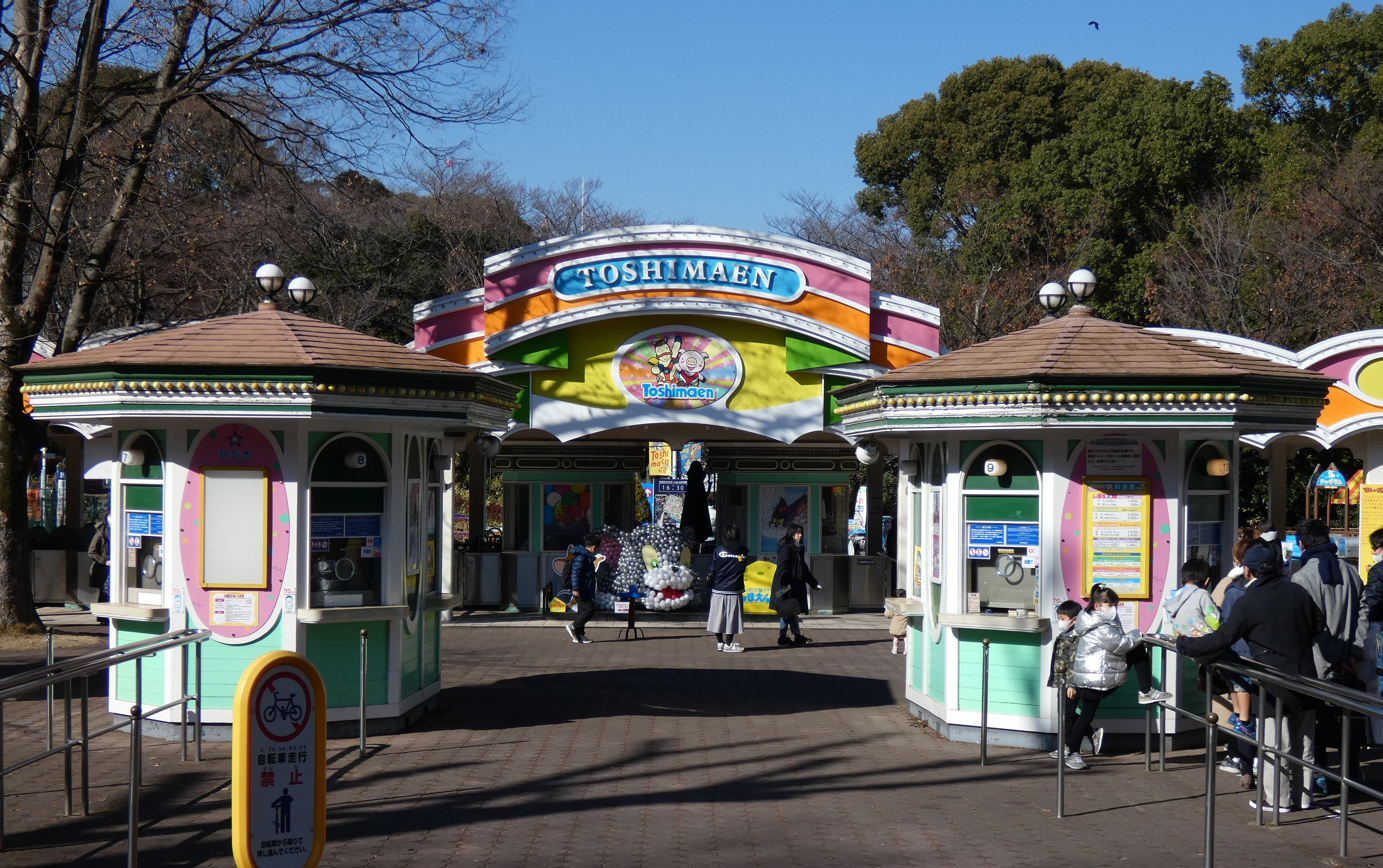
- Park entrance
- Interactive map of Toshimaen
- Location: Nerima, Tokyo, Japan
- Coordinates: 35°44′42″N 139°38′43″E
- Status: Defunct
- Opened: 15 September 1926
- Closed: 31 August 2020
- Owner: Seibu Group
- Area: 22 ha (54 acres)

Toshimaen (としまえん) was an amusement park in Nerima, Tokyo, Japan, owned by the Seibu Group. It had a variety of rides, including three roller coasters, a water park with 25 slides and six pools, and Carousel El Dorado, the country's oldest operational amusement ride. It closed permanently on August 31, 2020 and was redeveloped into Warner Bros. Studio Tour Tokyo – The Making of Harry Potter which opened on June 16, 2023.

== Attractions ==
=== Carousel El Dorado ===
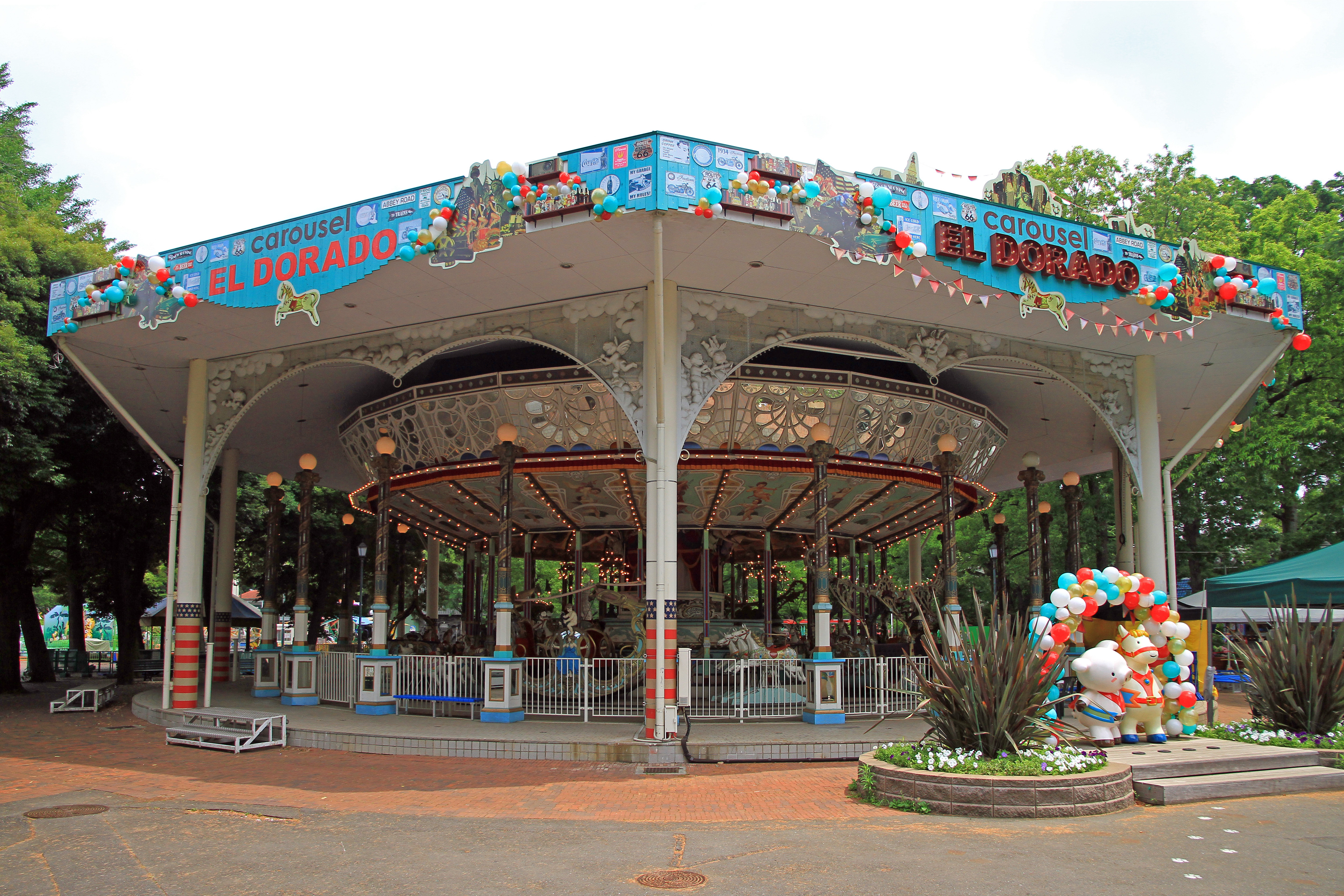
Carousel El Dorado was formerly located in Steeplechase Park in Coney Island.

Carousel El Dorado had non-jumping carousel figures installed on its rotating floor. The floor was divided into three parts and each ring turned at a different speed, with the outermost ring being the slowest and the innermost ring being the fastest. It was constructed in the Art Nouveau style, and is considered a valuable cultural property; it was given Mechanical Engineering Heritage status by the Japan Society of Mechanical Engineers on August 7, 2010.

The carousel was Japan's oldest operational amusement park ride. Built by Hugo Haase in Munich, Germany, in 1907, it premiered publicly at Oktoberfest and later operated at carnivals held in various parts of Europe. Due to the deterioration of social conditions, it was transferred to Steeplechase Park, one of the first amusement parks in Coney Island, New York City, in 1911, and was named "El Dorado." Celebrities such as former U.S. President Theodore Roosevelt, actress Marilyn Monroe, and gangster and businessman Al Capone rode the carousel while it was at this location.

Steeplechase Park closed in 1964 due to financial difficulties and the carousel was planned to be scrapped before Toshimaen bought it for about 100 million yen in 1969. It was loaded into six containers in 1970 and sent to Japan. Carousel El Dorado resumed operation on April 3, 1971, after extensive restoration work under the guidance of several experts, including Japanese carpenters specializing in wooden structures known as miyadaiku, art teachers, and electrical engineers. The restoration cost 200 million yen, and a Steeplechase Park admission ticket was found during this time. In 1983, through the Embassy of the United States in Japan and the Consulate-General of Japan in New York, a purchase request came from Coney Island, but Toshimaen replied, "Now, Japanese children are enjoying it," and refused.

Prior to Toshimaen's closure in 2020, the Nerima Ward Assembly (練馬区議会) submitted a written opinion to the Governor of Tokyo stating that Carousel El Dorado should be left in the "Nerima Castle Ruins Park" planned to be built at the time on the park's site. After the park's closure, the carousel was dismantled and stored in a Seibu Group warehouse.

=== River pool ===
Toshimaen's water park was the first in the world to have a river pool (a 350-meter, doughnut-shaped pool), which opened in 1965. The water park had other facilities as well, such as a children's pool that toddlers could swim in, a wave pool, and the Hydropolis with water slides.

== 2019 drowning incident ==
Toshimaen drowning incident
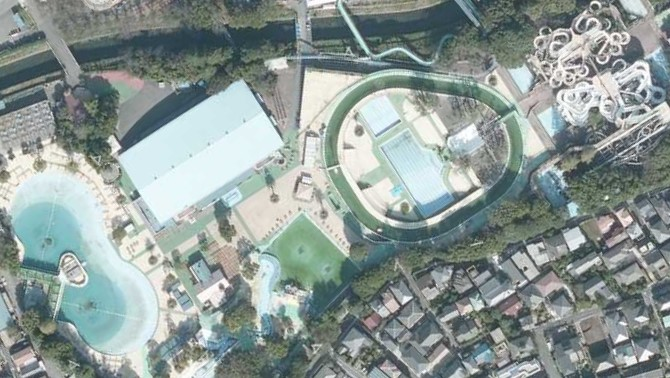
- Toshimaen swimming pool (November 2019). The nearly rectangular pool surrounded by the flowing pool on the right of the photo is the site. (Based on an aerial photograph from the Geospatial Information Authority of Japan's Map and Aerial Photograph Viewing Service, Ministry of Land, Infrastructure, Transport and Tourism; original photograph has been cropped and processed)
- Date: 15 August 2019
- Time: Around 14:00 (JST)
- Location: 'Fluffy Water Land' pool attraction at Toshimaen amusement park, Nerima-ku, Tokyo; 35°44′36.8″N 139°38′41.3″E
- Also known as: Toshimanen swimming pool fatal accident
- Cause: Lack of lifejackets and supervision
- Outcome: "A" (8-year-old girl) deaths

A drowning incident occurred on 15 August 2019 at the Fluffy Water Land (ふわふわウォーターランド) attraction. This attraction featured water-based inflatable play equipment. An eight-year-old girl, referred to only as 'A', who was wearing a life jacket, was found floating beneath the play equipment and subsequently drowned.

The incident became the subject of an investigation by the Consumer Affairs Agency. It was concluded that the child had fallen into the water, slipped under the play equipment, and was unable to escape due to the buoyancy of her life jacket.

In response to the incident, the Ministry of Economy, Trade and Industry established guidelines for the safety of water-based play equipment.

=== Accident site ===
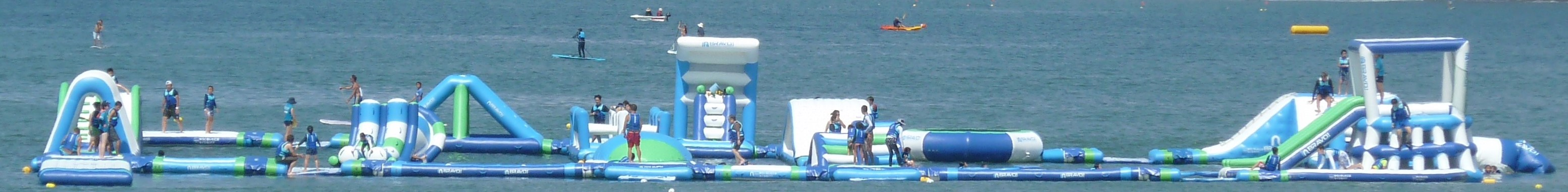
Examples of water-based play equipment (Image different from those at Toshimaen)

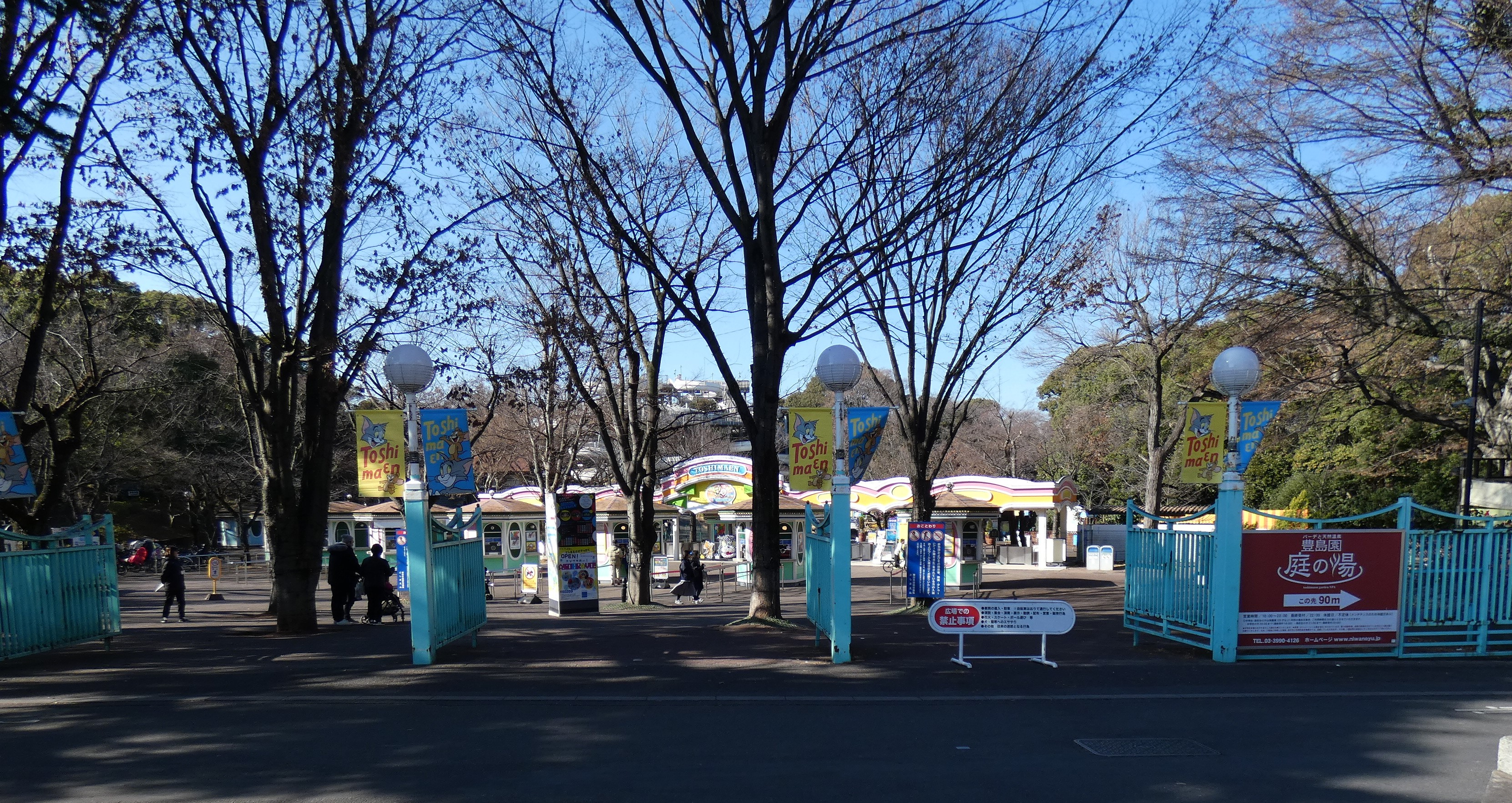
The main gate of Toshimaen where the accident occurred (photo taken in January 2019)

The accident occurred at Toshimaen's pool, which opened in 1929. Fluffy Water Land had been in operation since 2016. It was installed in a competitive swimming pool with eight lanes, measuring 50 metres in length, 20 metres in width, and a depth ranging from 1.2 to 1.9 metres. There were areas where someone of A's height could not touch the bottom. Fluffy Water Land had more than ten water-based play equipment, known as air toy types. These are professionally referred to as 'air membrane structure toys', which float on the water's surface by inflating them with air. They are easy to store when deflated and can be reshaped in various ways, which are their advantages. However, there were no nets or similar installations to prevent entry under the toys.

The planning and design of Fluffy Water Land were carried out independently by Toshimaen, and the toys were procured from a manufacturer in China. The toy that A fell from was large enough for about 15 adults and children to play at once. According to a man quoted by Tokyo Sports, who went to Fluffy Water Land with his children every year, the toys are more than 30 centimetres thick and have a slippery surface, making it impossible for children to climb onto the toys from the water on their own. Even adults would struggle to escape if they ended up under the toys while wearing life jackets.

At Fluffy Water Land, visitors had to be taller than 1.1 metres and were required to wear life jackets provided to prevent drowning and entry under the toys. The life jackets provided at Fluffy Water Land were solid-structured, using expanded polystyrene for buoyancy, and were shaped like a waistcoat. The life jacket was worn by putting both arms through and fastening it at the front, with adjustments made accordingly. In addition, visitors to Fluffy Water Land were verbally asked if they could swim on their own. Many users were also seen wearing inflatable armbands, according to eyewitnesses of the accident. At Fluffy Water Land, it was not uncommon for people to fall into the water from the toys, and on top of that, there were people who dropped their swimming goggles into the water at a rate of two per hour.

=== Accident ===
At the time, A was an eight-year-old girl in her third year of primary school, residing in Asaka City, Saitama Prefecture. On the day of the incident, A, along with her father (hereafter referred to as B), mother (hereafter referred to as C), and one-year-old sister (hereafter referred to as D), visited the pool at Toshimaen. A, who was over 1.1 metres tall, was wearing a life jacket. She began using the pool with B around 1pm. At approximately 1:30pm, B lost sight of A and asked the lifeguards to search for her. However, the lifeguards merely used a loudspeaker to call out, "Is A here?" and directed B to the lost children centre, without immediately conducting an underwater search. They asked B to wait until 2pm.

Just before 2pm, a lifeguard dived into the water to search for A but was unable to find her. At 2pm, a routine inspection began, during which all pool users were asked to get out of the water. A was found by a lifeguard around 2:10pm. She was discovered face down under a mat-like play equipment, approximately 2.5 metres long, 5 metres wide, and 30 centimetres thick, still wearing her life jacket. According to pool patrons who witnessed A being pulled out of the water, she was pale and limp when she was rescued, and a person believed to be C was screaming. A was unconscious and in critical condition. According to witnesses, she received cardiopulmonary resuscitation before being transported to the hospital, where her death was confirmed around 4pm.

At the time of the incident, there were approximately 270 people visiting Fluffy Water Land, and there were seven lifeguards on duty. It was reported that no abnormalities were observed during the routine inspection at noon, which included underwater checks.

=== Other ===
On the day of the incident, Toshimaen cancelled operations at Fluffy Water Land, as well as its evening pool operations (Night Pool), and suspended all pool activities from the following day, 16 August. The pool reopened on 23 August, but the rental of large inflatable rings was discontinued, and it was decided that Fluffy Water Land would not operate until the end of the pool season in 2019. Fluffy Water Land remained closed in 2020, leading up to the closure of Toshimaen itself on 31 August the same year.

=== Litigation ===
On 8 May 2020, the bereaved family members B and C of the deceased A filed a civil lawsuit in the Tokyo District Court, claiming that A's death was due to a lack of thorough safety management. They argued that, according to the guidelines of the Japan Air Play Equipment Safety Promotion Association, there should have been at least one supervisor per play equipment and a total of more than ten, but there were only seven in total. They sought a total of approximately ¥75 million (£377,600) in damages from Toshimaen, its parent company, Seibu Railway, the contractor in charge of surveillance, and the manufacturer and installer of the play equipment. Toshimaen officials attended A's funeral, but did not participate in the condolence visit and did not comply with the out-of-court dispute resolution procedure.

In an interview with the Sankei Shimbun, C stated that there had been comments from Toshimaen and others that the accident was unforeseen, and regarding the document received from Toshimaen after the accident, C said, "The content seemed to be blaming each other for the accident, and I didn't feel any sincerity at all," "What do they think of my daughter's life?" and "I didn't feel any sense of apology at all." The pool management company responded to an NHK interview immediately after the accident, stating that they had not anticipated that someone would enter under the play equipment.

The first oral argument took place on 14 September 2020, but all the defendants indicated a willingness to contest the case and asked for the plaintiff's claim to be dismissed. Seibu Railway merely commented, "We offer our condolences again. We will clarify our claims in the lawsuit". Bunshun Online reported that it is certain that the trial will be prolonged, as all four defendant companies are blaming each other for the accident.

On 6 March 2023, a settlement was reached in the Tokyo District Court. The details of the settlement were not disclosed.

== Closure ==
The park closed on 31 August 2020 and reopened as Warner Bros. Studio Tour Tokyo – The Making of Harry Potter on June 16, 2023. It is the second Harry Potter-themed attraction in Japan, after The Wizarding World of Harry Potter at Universal Studios Japan in Osaka, and the second Studio Tour dedicated to the Wizarding World franchise (after the Warner Bros. Studio Tour London). Not all of the former park's 22 hectares were used for the Studio Tour; the majority of the former Toshimaen site was purchased by the Tokyo Metropolitan Government after its closure, and is planned to be developed as a large park that serves as a base for use in event of a disaster.

== Gallery ==
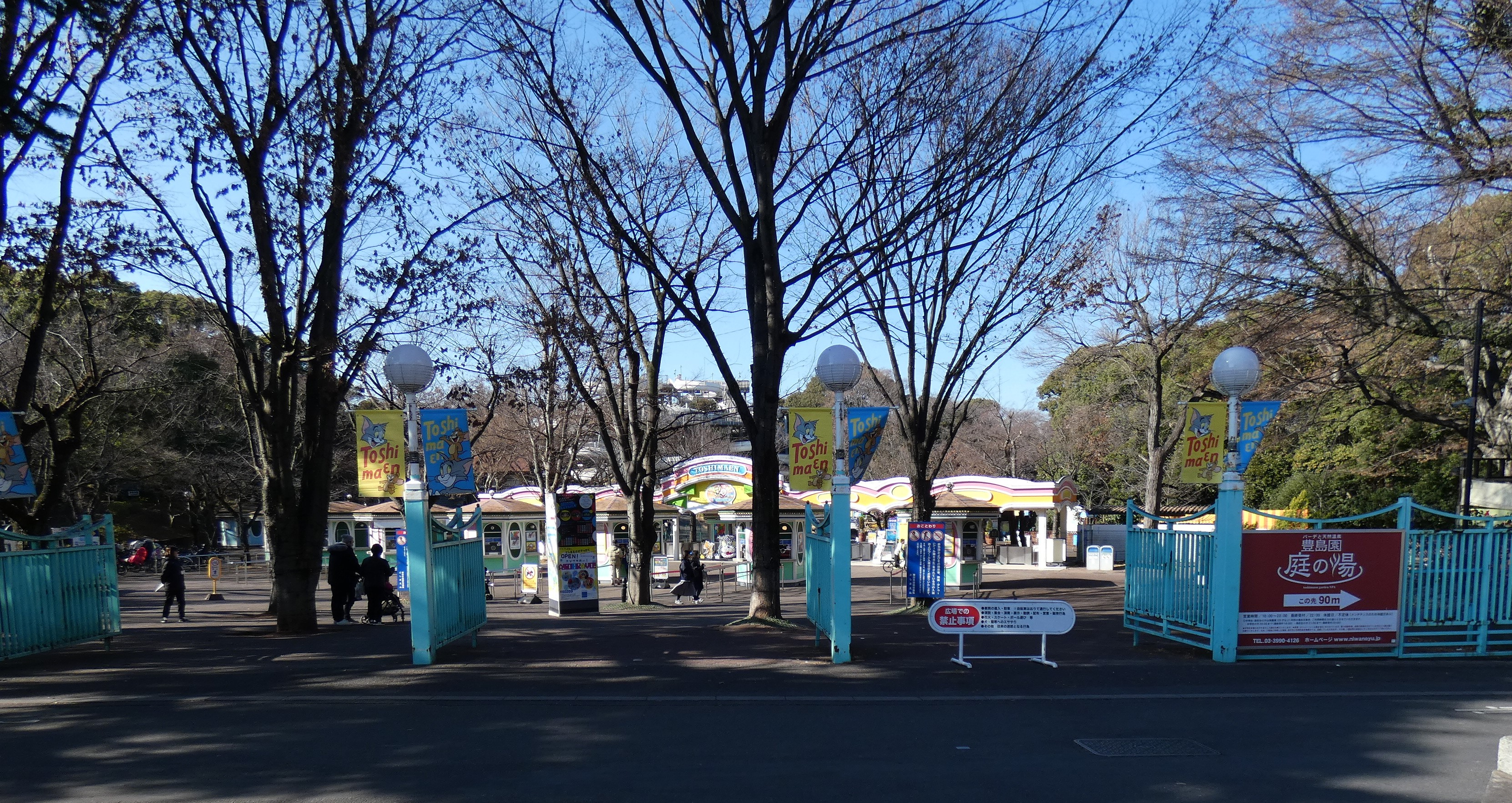
Toshimaen main gate

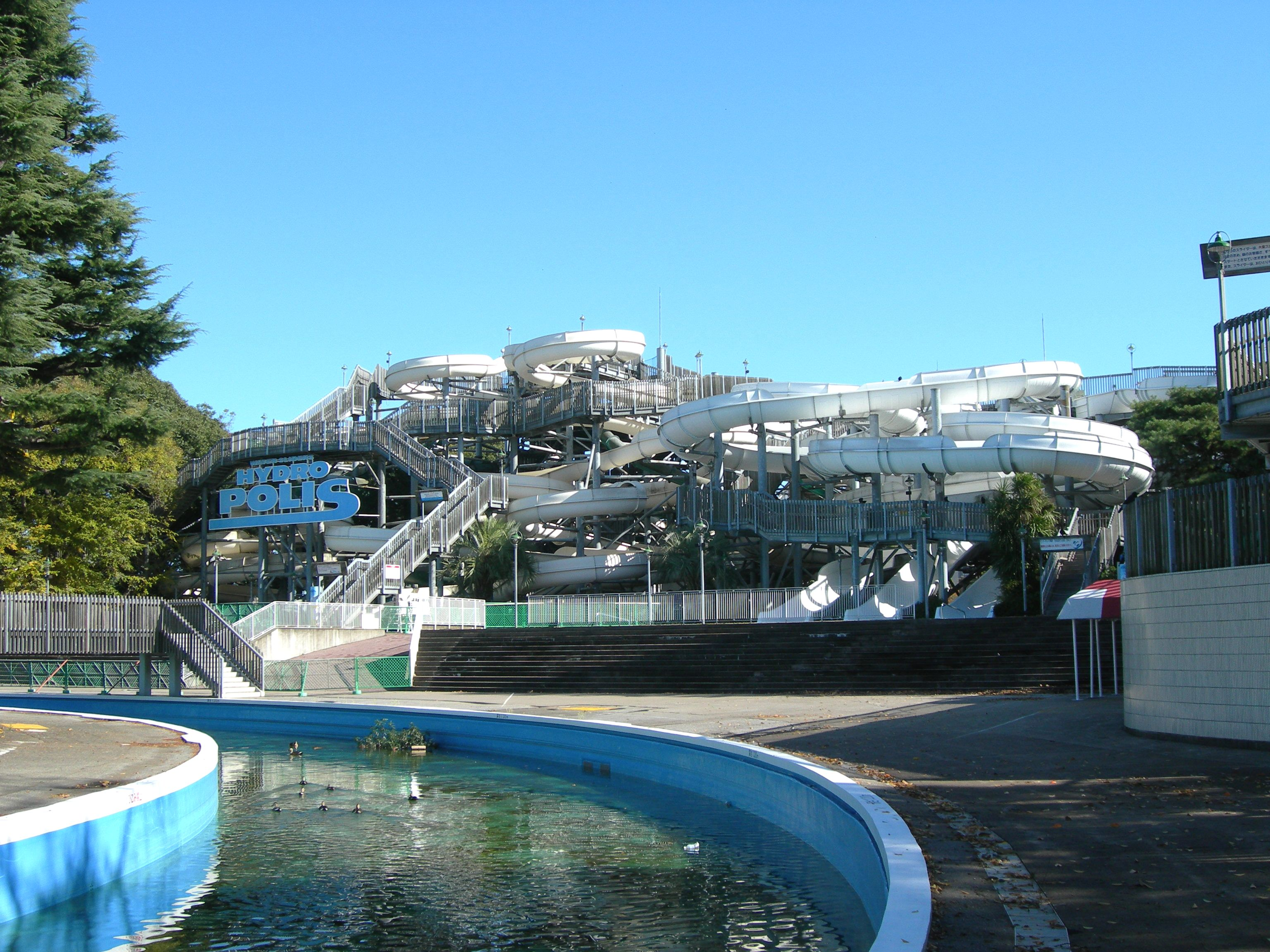
"Hydropolis" water slides

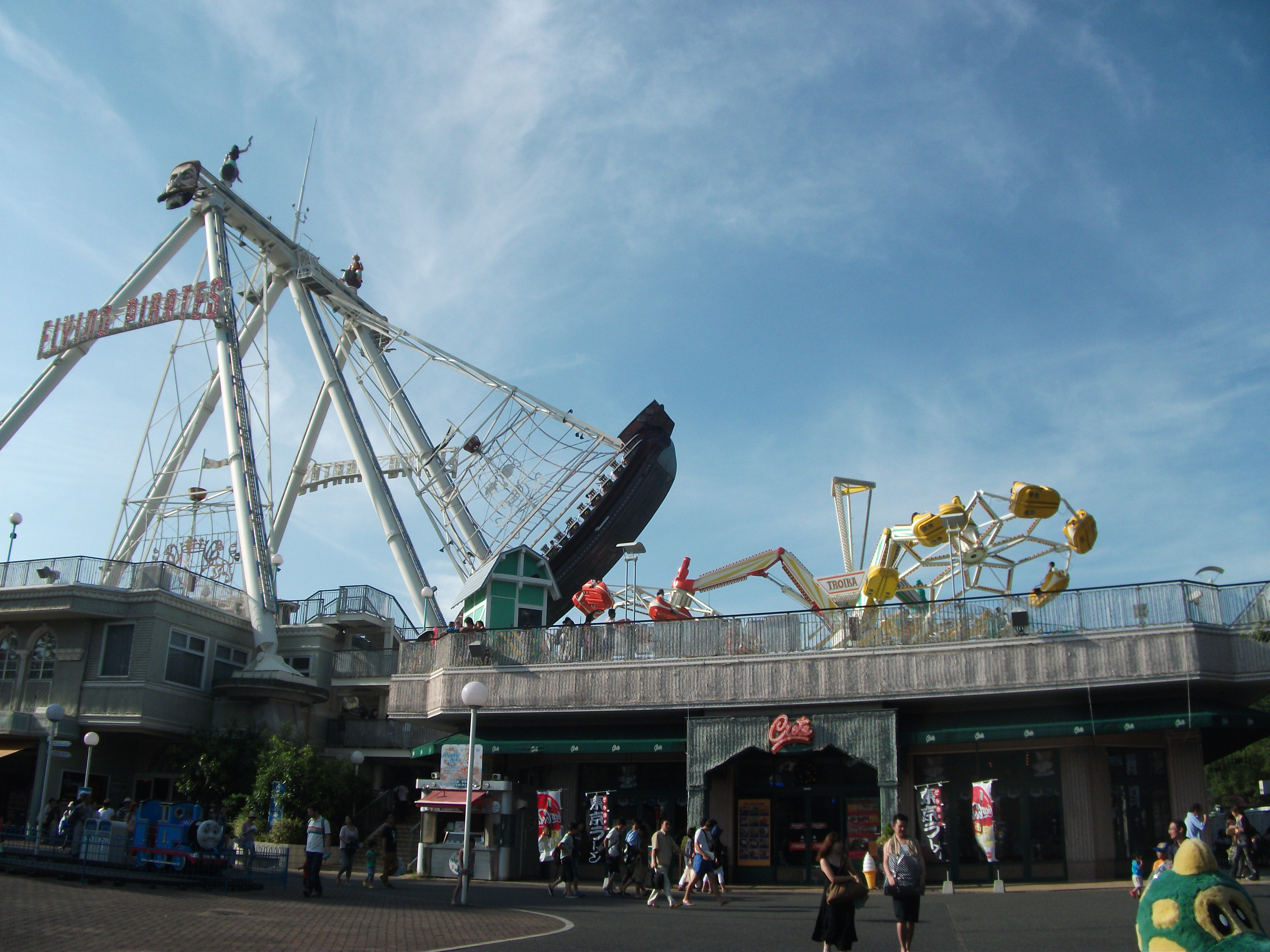
The "Flying Pirates" and the "Troika"

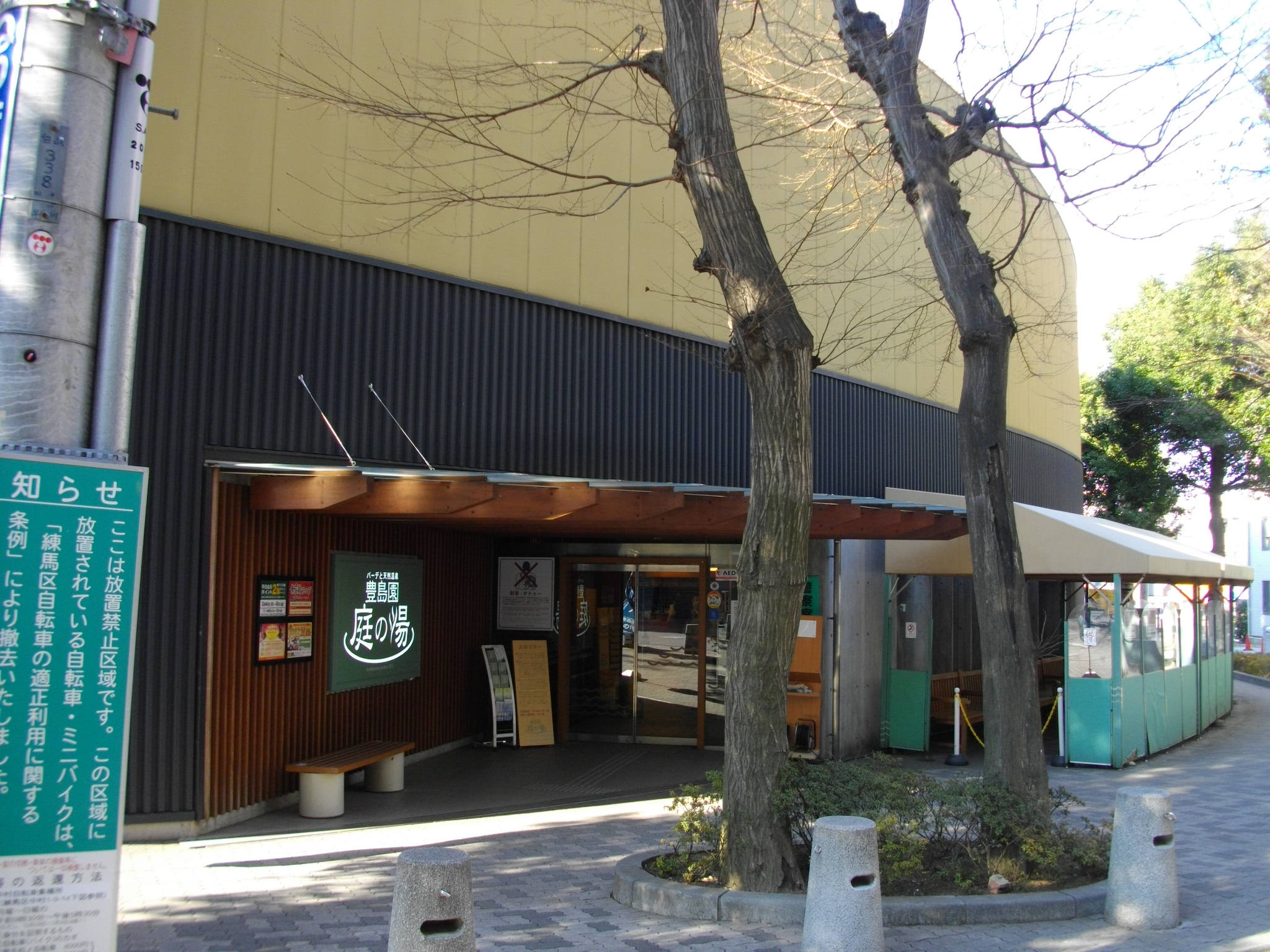
An attached hot spring facility called Niwa-no-yu (庭の湯). It continues to operate even after the park's closure. A hot spring was discovered during an underground measurement conducted to build the Toei Ōedo Line subway.

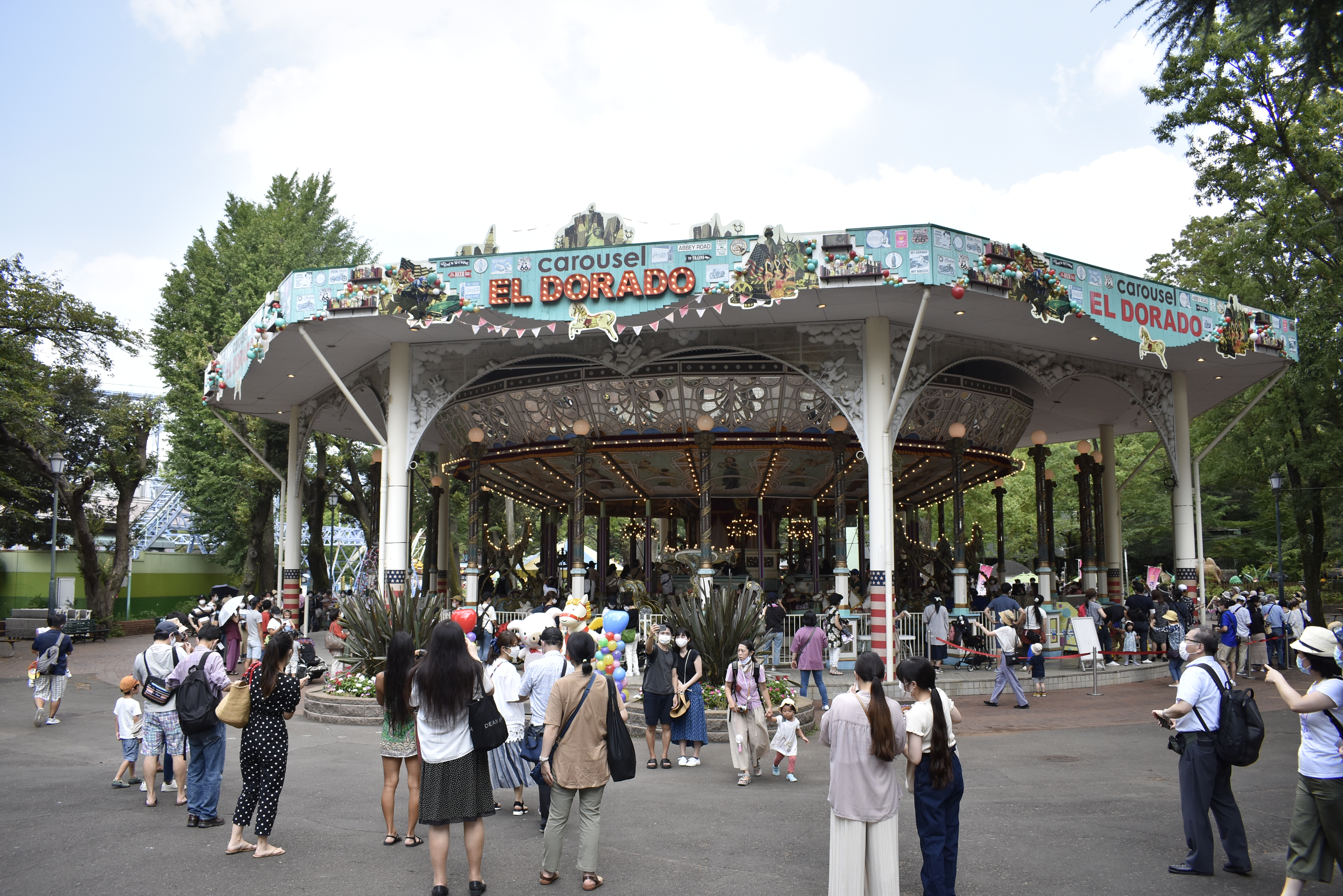
Toshimaen five days before closing

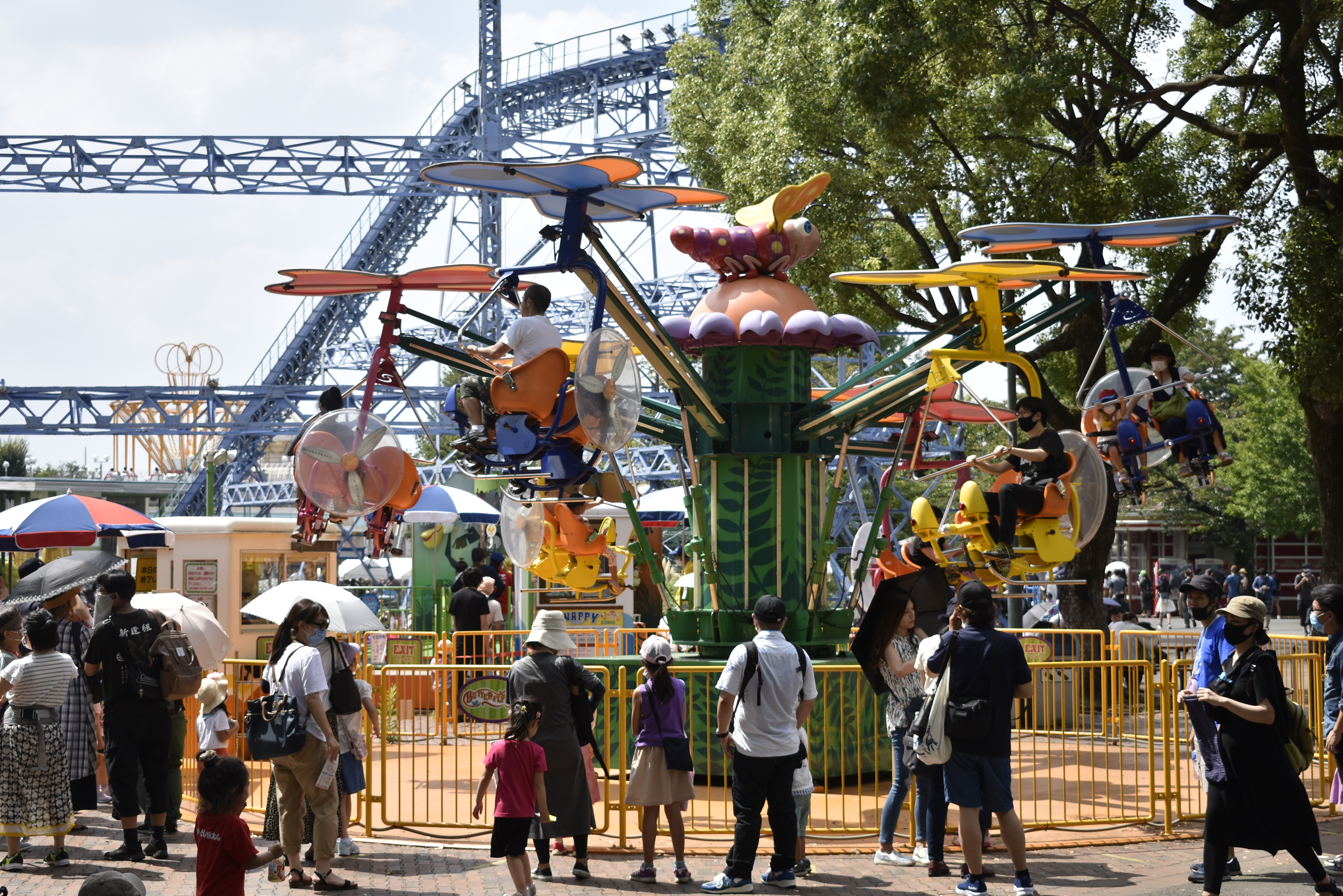
Toshimaen five days before closing

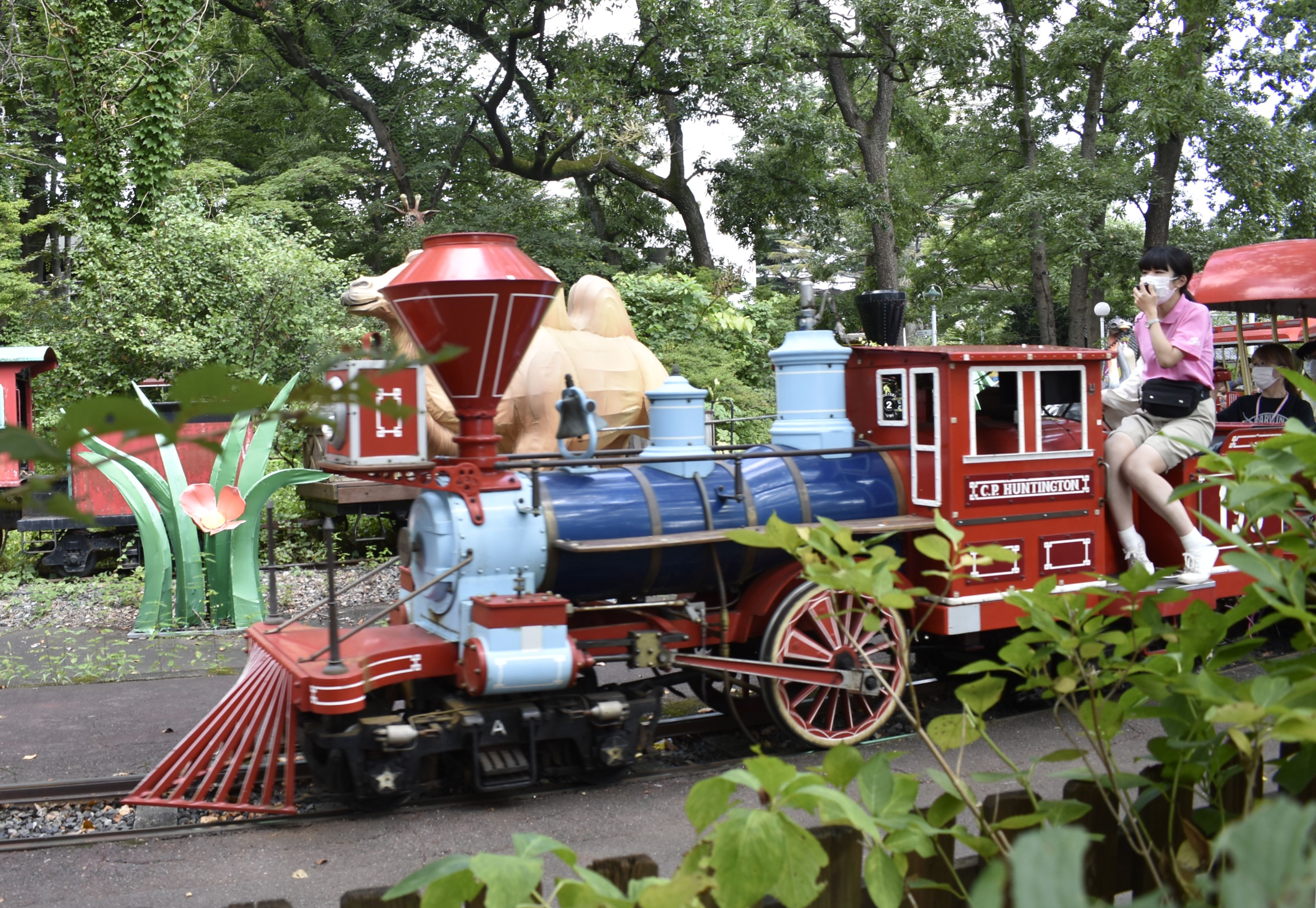
Toshimaen five days before closing

== Transportation ==
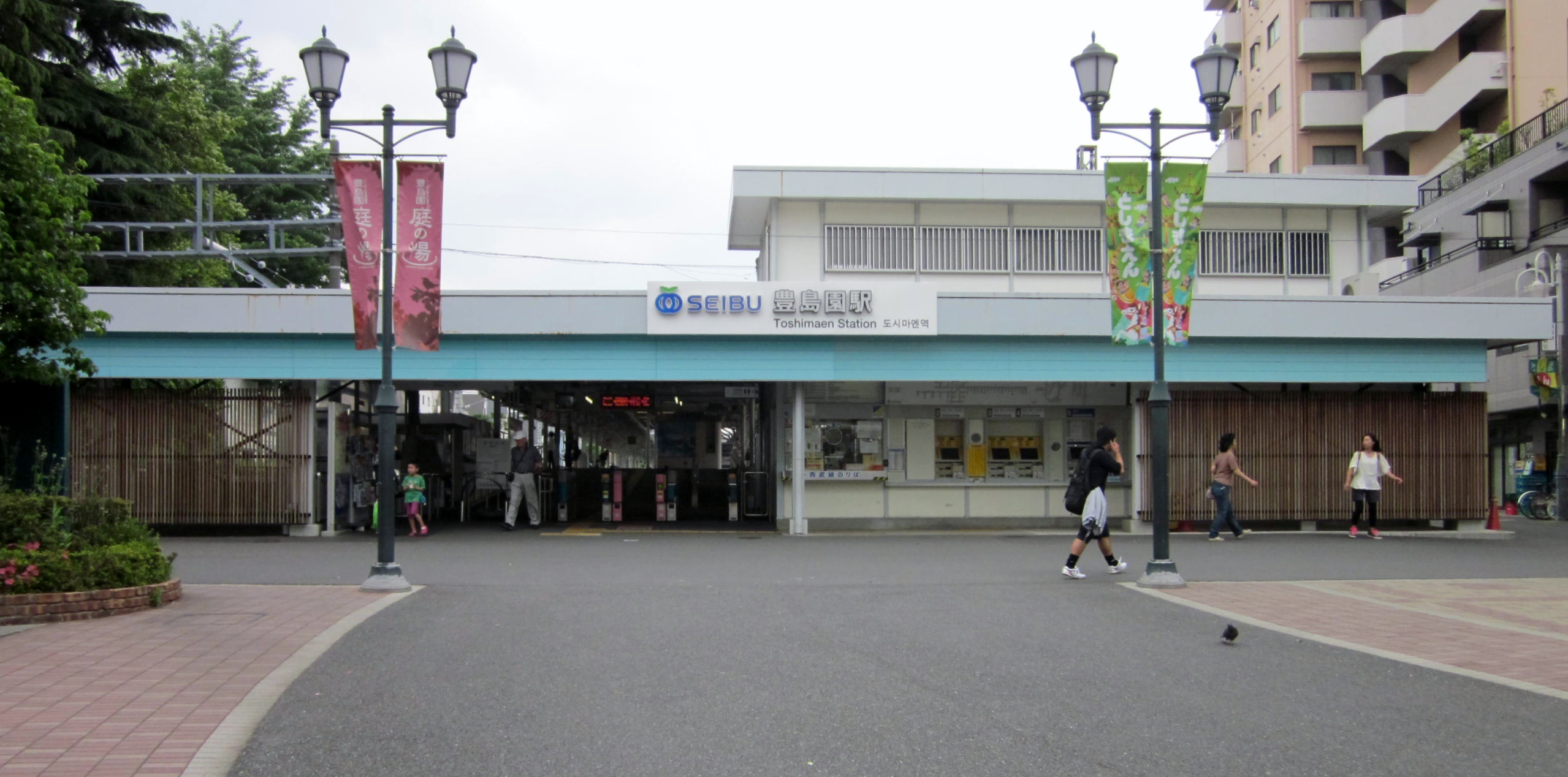
Toshimaen Station

Toshimaen was located near Toshimaen Station on the Seibu Toshima Line and Toei Ōedo Line.
