= Shakujii Castle =

Building in Tokyo, Japan

Coordinates: 35.737282°N 139.596791°E

Shakujii Castle 石神井城
- Shakujii Park, Nerima, Tokyo, Japan
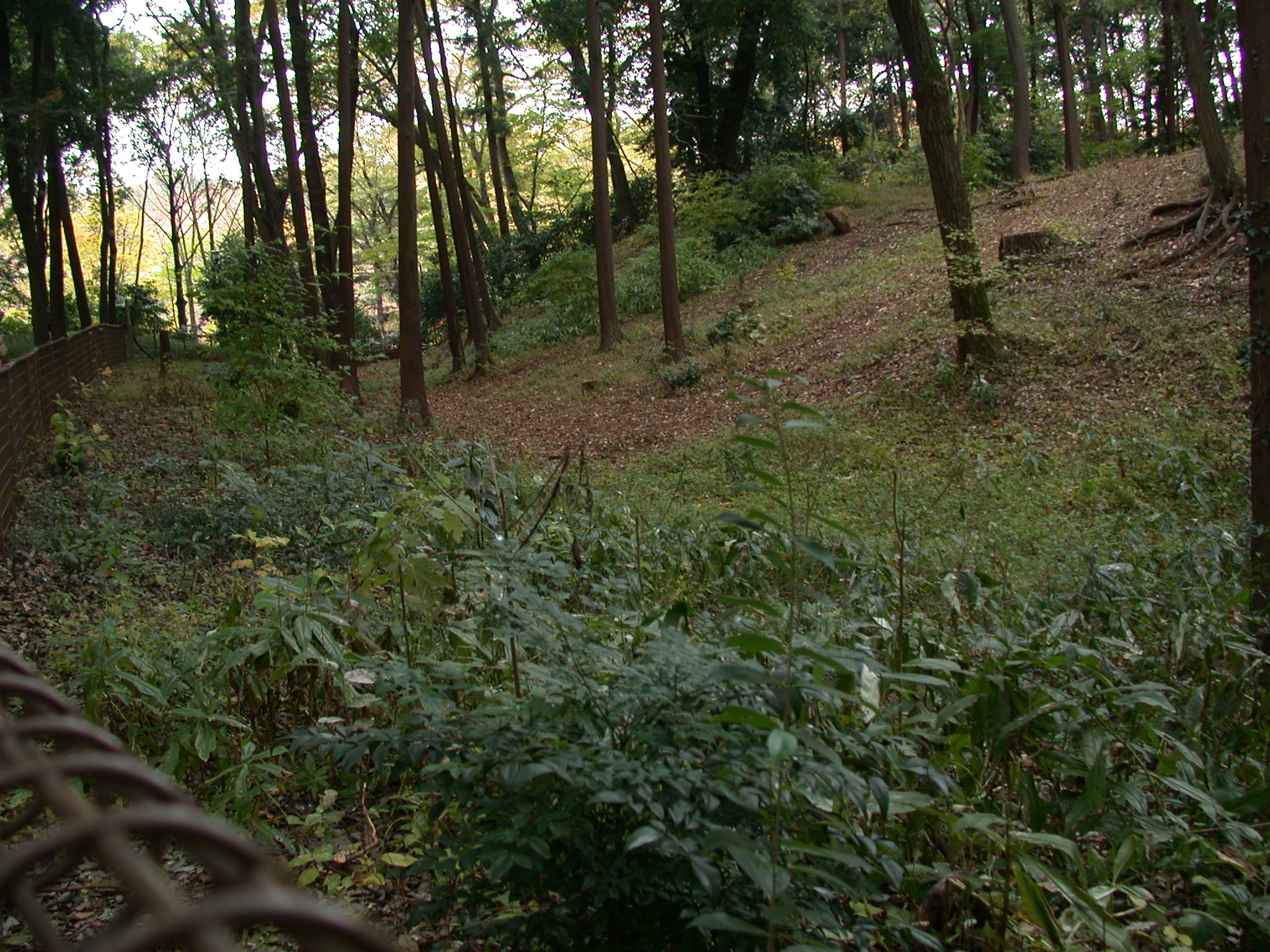
- The ruins of Shakujii Castle

Site information
- Type: Kamakura period Japanese castle
- Controlled by: Toshima clan
- Condition: Traces remain; location is within a public park

Location

Site history
- Built: Kamakura period (1185-1333)
- Materials: Wood, earthworks
- Demolished: late 1470s
- Battles/wars: Kyōtoku Rebellion (1477)

Shakujii castle (石神井城, -jō) was a Japanese castle along the Shakujii River, in what is now Shakujii Park, in Tokyo's Nerima. The history of the inheritance of the feudal territory associated with it is the most clearly known of all territories in what is today Tokyo.

== History ==
The castle was strategically placed along the Shakujii River, near Sanpōji Pond, to control and defend the river valley. Though there may have been another similar fortification erected nearby during the Heian period (794–1185), it is likely that the last incarnation of Shakujii castle was first built after the Kamakura period (1185–1333). A dam was built around the same time, a short distance from the castle, at a spot selected by a diviner, to block the waterway.

The castle lasted into the Muromachi period (1336–1467) and was controlled by the Toshima clan. They, supported by Kanrei (Shōgun's deputy) Ashikaga Mochiuji, were in their prime during the rebellion of Uesugi Zenshū, which lasted from 1415 to 1417.

However, roughly 40 years later, the Toshima took part in the 1477 Kyōtoku Rebellion, supporting the uprising of Nagao Kageharu. Toshima Yasutsune led the forces of Shakujii castle and nearby Nerima castle to reinforce his brother, Toshima Yasuaki, who was attacked at Hiratsuka castle. They were defeated by the army of Ōta Dōkan, a vassal of the Uesugi clan, who put down the rebellion. The Toshima then fled to Kozukue Castle. They were defeated there as well, and Shakujii castle was destroyed a short time later.

Recently, attempts have been made to restore the castle. However, there is very little remaining above ground. Based on what digging has revealed, it has been difficult to determine the exact location, size, and extent of the fortifications and the moat.
