= Toshimaen Station =

Railway and metro station in Tokyo, Japan

Coordinates: 35°44′33″N 139°38′53″E

SI39 Toshimaen Station 豊島園駅

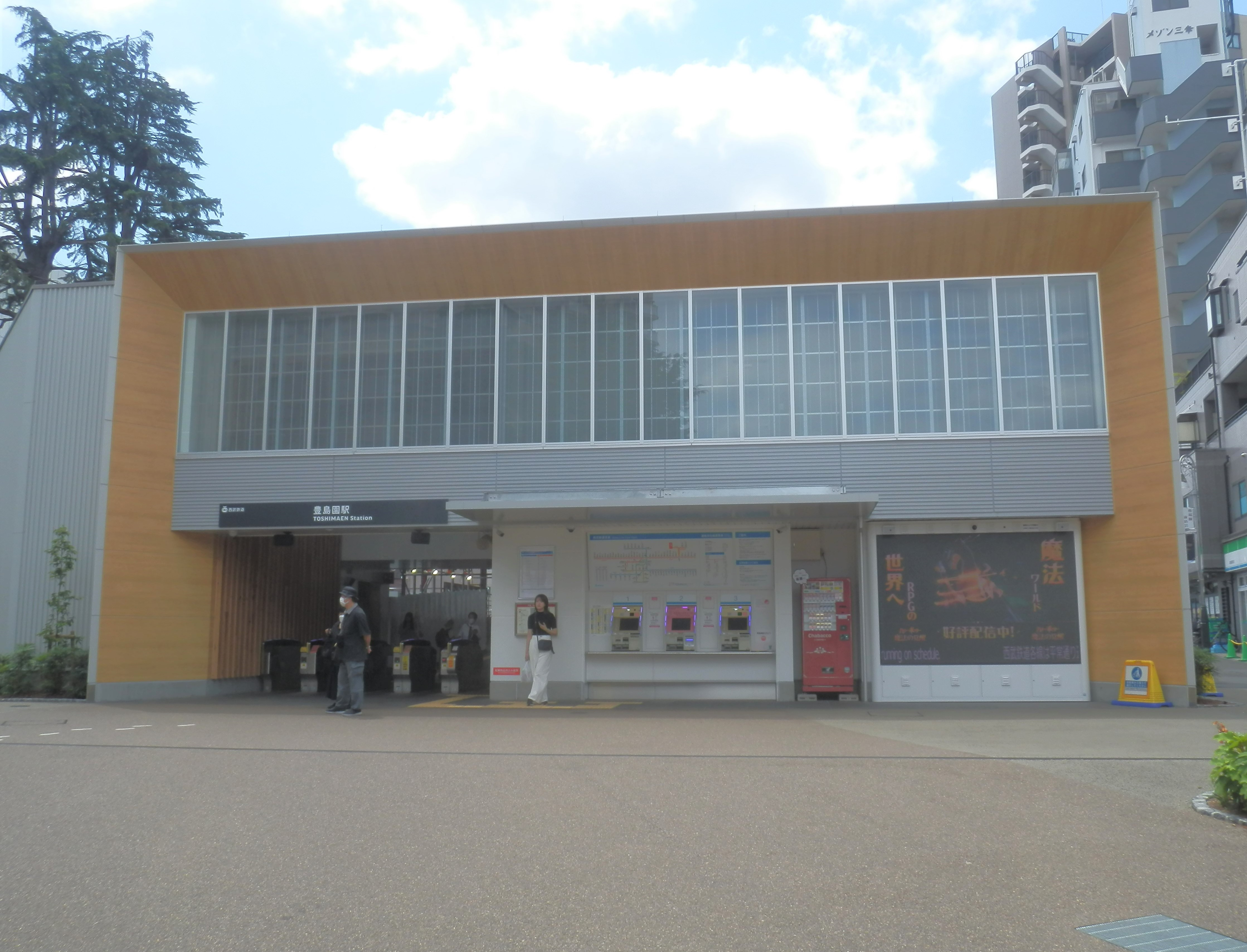
- The Seibu station in July 2023

General information
- Location: 4-16-5 Nerima, Nerima-ku, Tokyo; Japan
- Operator: Seibu Railway; Toei Subway
- Lines: Seibu Toshima Line; Ōedo Line
- Platforms: 2 island platforms (1 Seibu, 1 Toei)
- Tracks: 4

Construction
- Structure type: At grade (Seibu), Underground (Toei)

Other information
- Station code: SI39 (Seibu); E36 (Toei)

History
- Opened: 15 October 1927; 98 years ago
- Former names: Toshima (until 1933)

Passengers
- Seibu, FY2013: 13,583 daily

Services
Preceding station	Seibu Railway	Following station
Terminus	Toshima Line	Nerima SI06 Terminus
Preceding station	Toei Subway	Following station
Nerima-kasugachō towards Hikarigaoka	Ōedo Line	Nerima towards Tochōmae
Location
- Location within Special wards of Tokyo Location within Tokyo Bay and Bōsō Peninsula Location within Tokyo Location within Japan

Toshimaen Station (豊島園駅, Toshimaen-eki) is a railway station in Nerima, Tokyo, Japan, operated by the private railway operator Seibu Railway and the Tokyo subway operator Toei Subway. It is located next to the former site of Toshimaen amusement park and the current Warner Bros. Studio Tour Tokyo – The Making of Harry Potter.

== Lines ==
Toshimaen Station is served by the Seibu Toshima Line and the Toei Ōedo Line.

== Platforms ==
=== Seibu Toshima Line ===
The Seibu station consists of an island platform serving two terminating tracks. An additional disembarking platform originally existed opposite platform 2.

1/2	Seibu Toshima Line	for Nerima and Ikebukuro

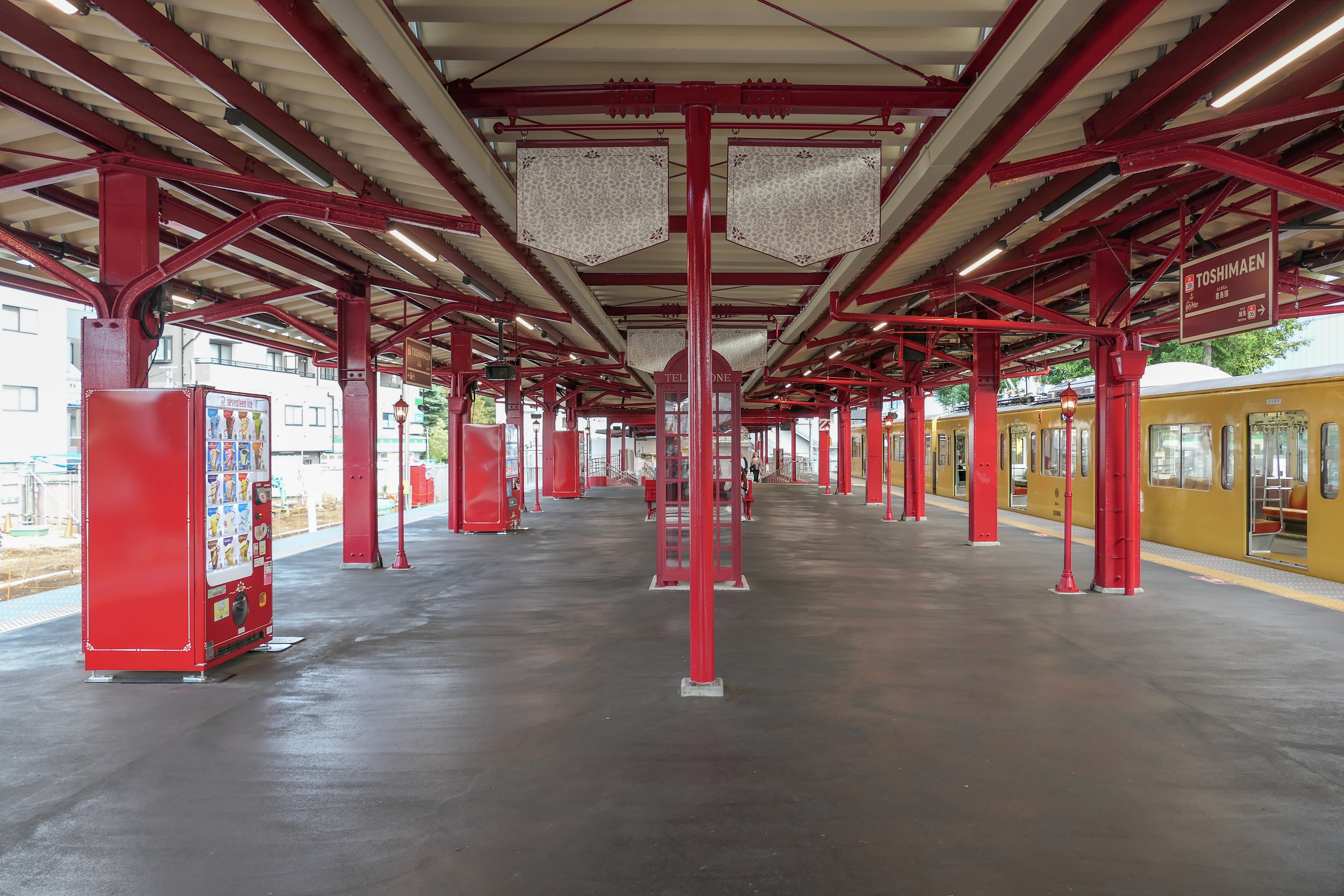
Seibu platforms, 2023

=== Toei Ōedo Line ===
The Toei station has an island platform serving two tracks.

1	Ōedo Line	for Tochōmae, Roppongi, and Daimon
2	Ōedo Line	for Hikarigaoka

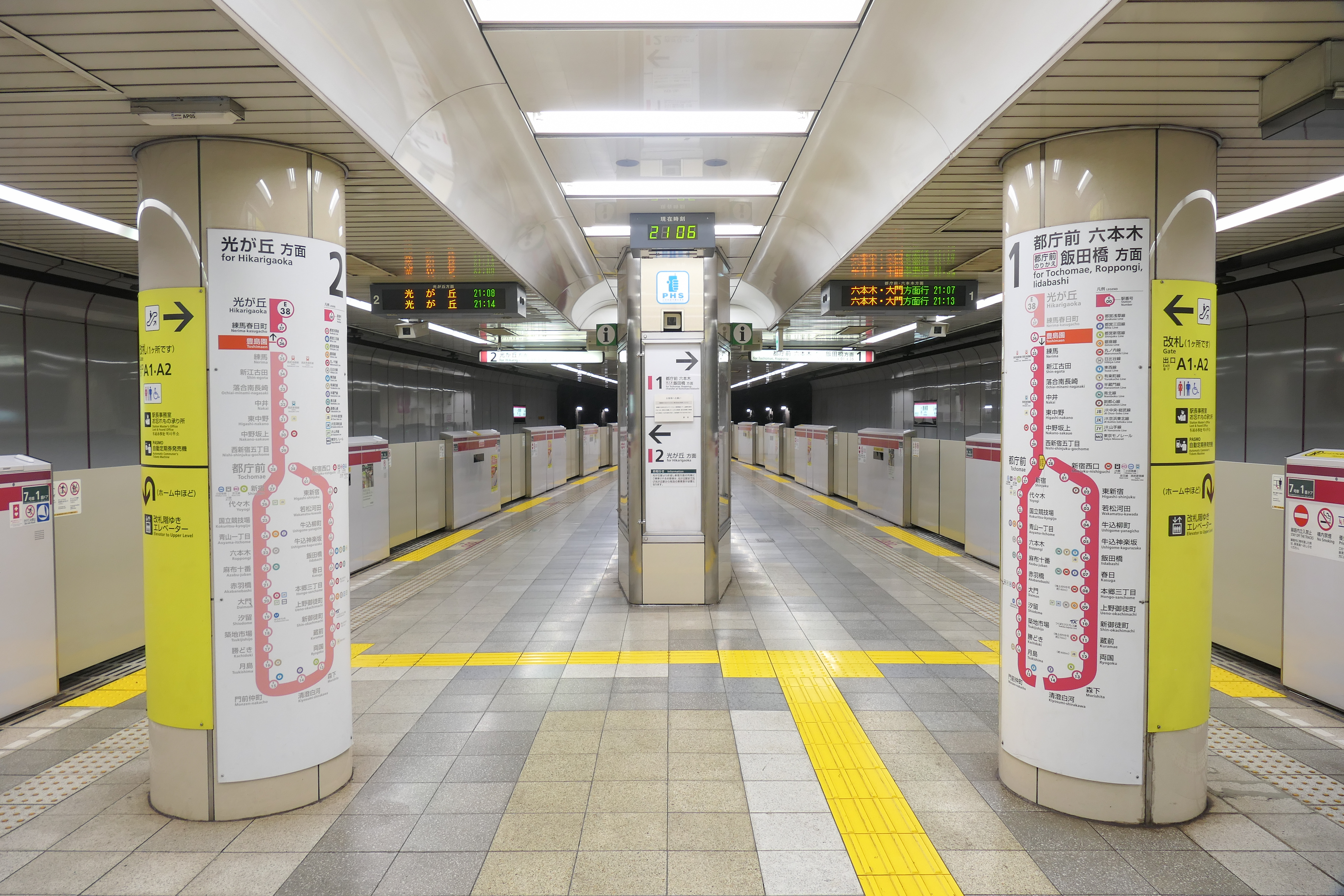
Toei platforms, 2023

== History ==
The Seibu station opened on 15 October 1927, originally named Toshima Station (豊島駅). It was renamed Toshimaen on 1 March 1933. The Toei station opened on 10 December 1991.

Station numbering was introduced on all Seibu Railway lines during fiscal 2012, with Toshimaen Station becoming "SI39".

== Passenger statistics ==
In fiscal 2013, the Seibu station was the 60th busiest on the Seibu network with an average of 13,583 passengers daily.

The passenger figures for the Seibu station in previous years are as shown below.

Fiscal year	Daily average
2000	12,560
2009	12,927
2010	12,639
2011	12,707
2012	13,318
2013	13,583

== Surrounding area ==
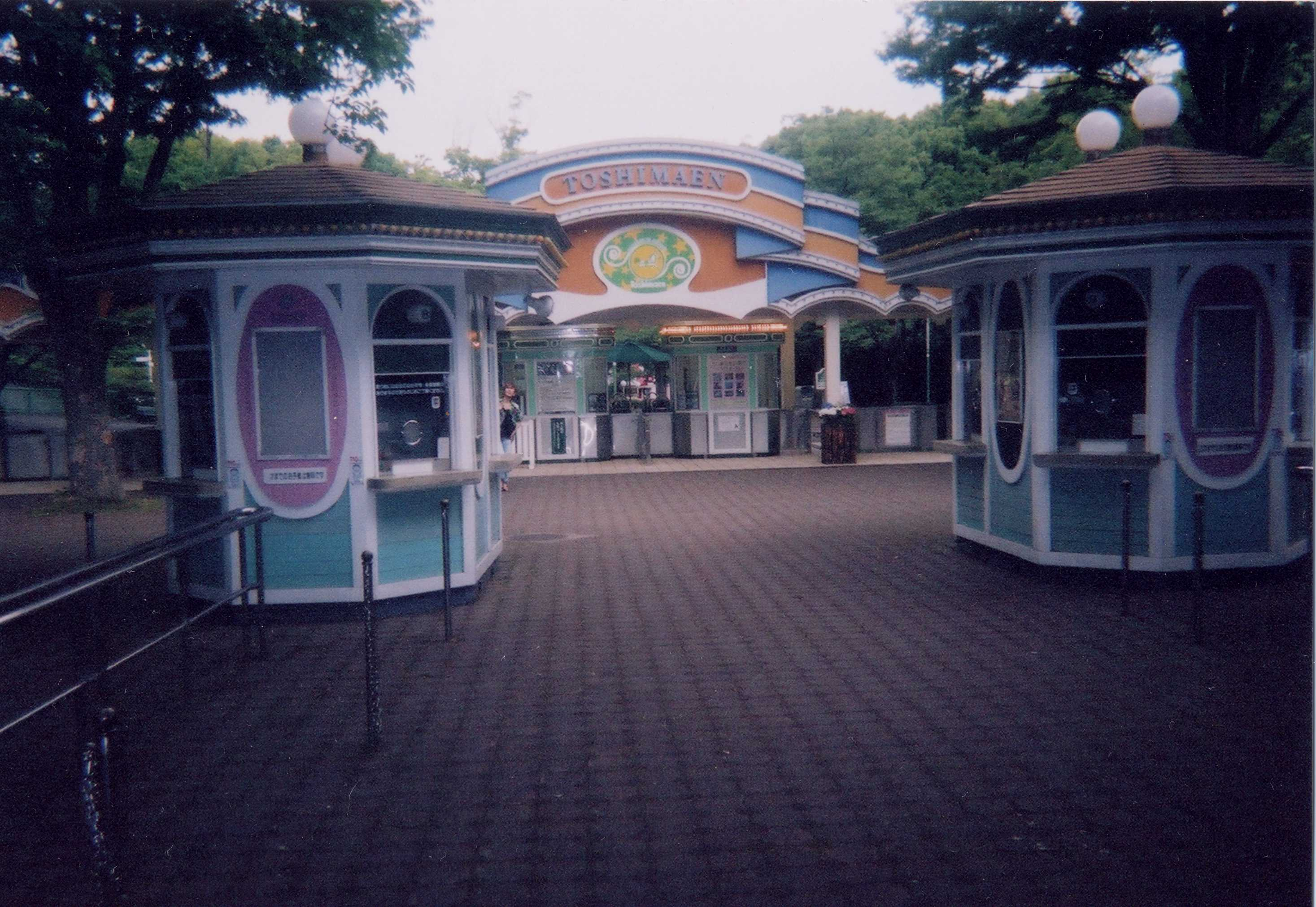
Toshimaen amusement park entrance in January 2009

- Toshimaen amusement park (formerly)
- Warner Bros. Studio Tour Tokyo – The Making of Harry Potter

== See also ==
- List of railway stations in Japan
