= Seibu Toshima Line =

Railway line in Nerima, Tokyo, Japan

Toshima Line
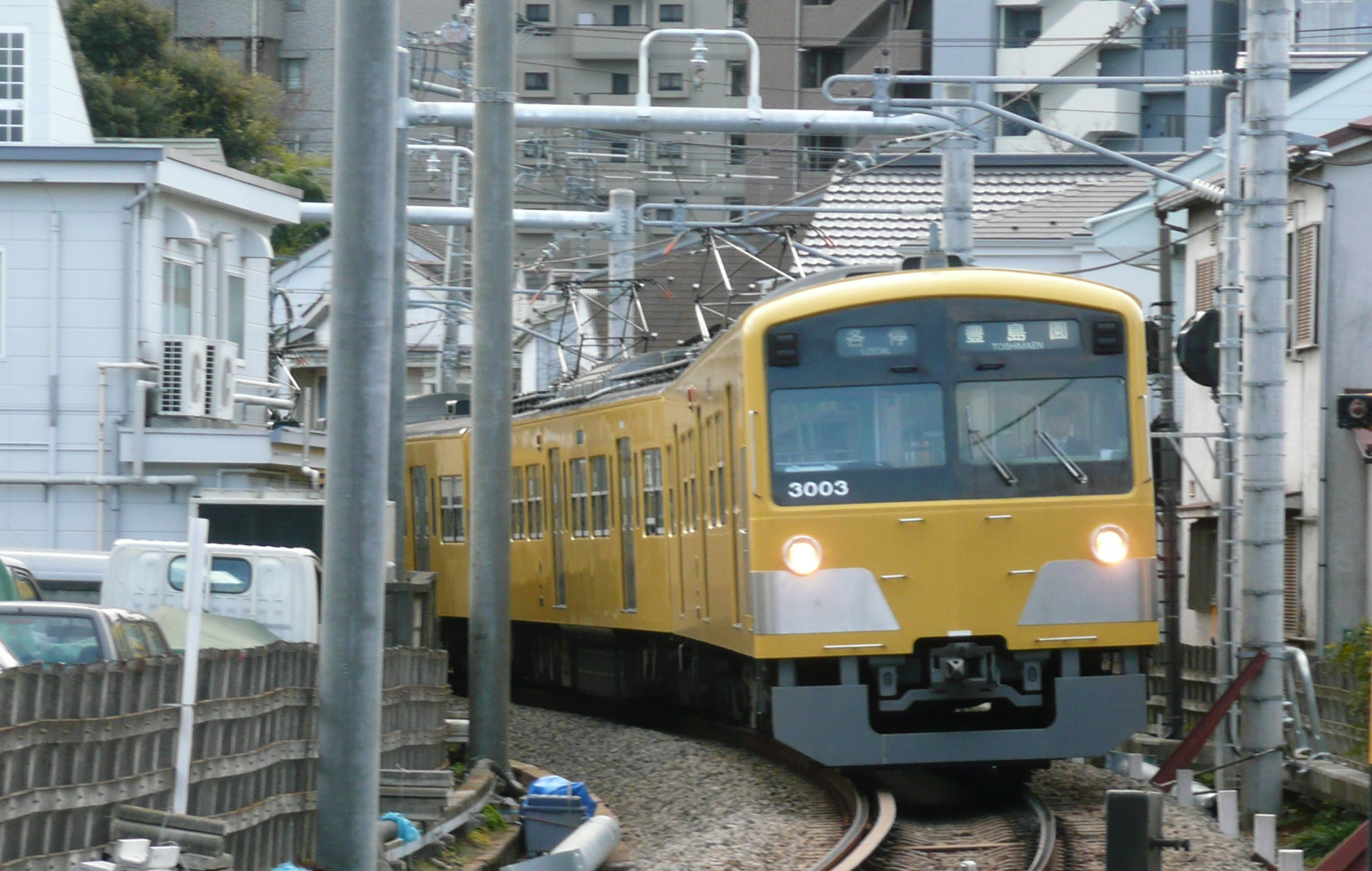
- Seibu 3000 series EMU on the Toshima Line, December 2011

Overview
- Native name: 豊島線
- Owner: Seibu Railway
- Locale: Nerima, Tokyo
- Termini: Nerima; Toshimaen
- Stations: 2

History
- Opened: 15 October 1927; 98 years ago

Technical
- Line length: 1.0 km (0.6 mi)
- Number of tracks: 1
- Track gauge: 1,067 mm (3 ft 6 in)
- Electrification: 1,500 V DC, overhead catenary
- Operating speed: 60 km/h (35 mph)

The Toshima Line (豊島線, Toshima-sen) is a commuter railway line in Tokyo, Japan, operated by the private railway operator Seibu Railway. The line connects Nerima Station and Toshimaen Station, both in Nerima Ward, Tokyo. Most services connect directly to the Ikebukuro Line as a local service between Nerima Station and Ikebukuro Station. It runs parallel to the Toei Oedo Line.

== Stations ==
Despite the name "Toshima Line," neither station is in Toshima Ward.

No.	Station	Japanese	Distance (km)	Transfers	Location
	Nerima	練馬	0.0	Ikebukuro Line (SI06); Ōedo Line (E-35)	Nerima, Tokyo
	Toshimaen	豊島園	1.0	Ōedo Line (E-36)	Nerima, Tokyo

== History ==
The line opened on 15 October 1927, between Nerima Station and Toshima Station (present-day Toshimaen Station.)

Station numbering was introduced on all Seibu Railway lines during fiscal year 2012. Toshima Line station numbers are prefixed with the letters "SI" (designating it as a branch of the Ikebukuro Line).
