= LGBTQ rights in Japan =

- Japan
- Legal status: Legal since 1882
- Gender identity: Legal sex changes allowed since 2004, requiring gender confirmation surgery
- Military: LGBT people allowed to serve openly
- Discrimination protections: Sexual orientation and gender identity protected in some cities and prefectures, though not nationally

Family rights
- Recognition of relationships: No national legal recognition of same-sex relationships, some localities offer partnership certificates
- Adoption: No recognition nationally, some localities provide accommodations

Lesbian, gay, bisexual, transgender, and queer (LGBTQ) people in Japan have fewer legal protections than in most other developed countries, although some developments towards stronger rights have been made in the 2020s. Same-sex sexual activity was criminalised only briefly in Japan's history between 1873 and 1881, after which a localised version of the Napoleonic Penal Code was adopted with an equal age of consent. Same-sex couples and households headed by same-sex couples are ineligible for the legal protections available to opposite-sex couples, although since 2015 some cities and prefectures, covering over 92% of the population by 2025, offer "partnership certificates" to recognise the relationships of same-sex couples and provide some legal benefits. Japan is the only country in the G7 that does not legally recognize same-sex unions nationally in any form. In March 2021 and May 2023, the Sapporo and Nagoya District Courts ruled that not recognising same-sex marriage was a violation of the Constitution. While in June 2022, the Osaka District Court ruled that not recognising same-sex marriage was not a violation of the Constitution, in November 2022, the Tokyo District Court ruled that the absence of same-sex marriage legislation was an unconstitutional state of affairs but did not violate the Constitution, though the court's ruling has no immediate legal effect. In June 2023, the Fukuoka District Court ruled that the ban on same-sex marriage was constitutional. A second ruling in September 2023 concluded that same-sex relationships should not be excluded from Japan's marriage system.

Japan's culture and major religions do not have a history of hostility towards homosexuality. A 2019 poll indicated that 68 percent of the respondents agreed that homosexuality should be accepted by society, while 22 percent disagreed. Although many political parties have not openly supported or opposed LGBTQ rights, there are several openly LGBTQ politicians in office. The conservative Liberal Democratic Party, Japan's leading political party, remains opposed to same-sex marriage, while two other major parties, the liberal Constitutional Democratic Party and libertarian Innovation Party both favor same-sex marriage. As of 2023, marriage equality movements have been gaining prominence within the nation. A law allowing transgender individuals to change their legal gender post-sex reassignment surgery and sterilization was passed in 2003. The sterilization requirement was unanimously ruled by the Japanese Supreme Court to be unconstitutional in October 2023, removing the requirement. Discrimination on the basis of sexual orientation and gender identity is banned in some cities, including Tokyo.

Tokyo Rainbow Pride has been held annually since 2012, with attendance increasing every year. A 2015 opinion poll reflected that the majority of its respondents supported the legalization of same-sex marriage. Further opinion polls conducted over the following years have found high levels of support for same-sex marriage among the Japanese public, most notably the younger generation. However, a 2020 survey of over 10,000 LGBTQ people in Japan found that 38 percent of LGBTQ people had been harassed or assaulted.

In 2019, 2022 and 2025, Japan voted in favor of the United Nations independent expert on sexual orientation and gender identity at the United Nations Human Rights Council.

== History ==
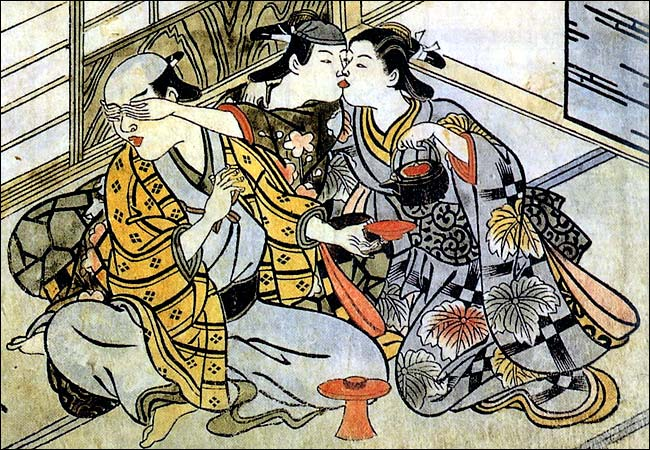
A wakashū (wearing headscarf) sneaks a kiss from a female prostitute behind his patron's back. Nishikawa Sukenobu (1671–1750)

Homosexuality and same-sex relations have been documented in Japan since ancient times. One Shinto myth describes same-sex love as being introduced by the couple Shinu no Hafuri and Ama no Hafuri, servants of a "primordial goddess", presumably Amaterasu. Following Shinu's death, Ama killed himself, and the two were buried in the same grave.

In the pre-Meiji era, nanshoku (男色) relationships inside Buddhist monasteries were typically pederastic. The older partner, or nenja (念者; "lover" or "admirer"), would be a monk, priest or abbot, while the younger partner was assumed to be an acolyte (稚児, chigo), who would be a prepubescent or adolescent boy. The relationship would be dissolved once the boy reached adulthood (or left the monastery). Both parties were encouraged to treat the relationship seriously and conduct the affair honorably, and the nenja might be required to write a formal vow of fidelity. During the Tokugawa period, some of the Shinto gods, especially Hachiman, Myoshin, Shinmei and Tenjin, "came to be seen as guardian deities of nanshoku" (male–male love).

From religious circles, same-sex love spread to the warrior (samurai) class, where it was customary for a boy in the wakashū age category to undergo training in the martial arts by apprenticing to a more experienced adult man. The relationship was based on the typical nenja, who loves, and the typically younger chigo, who is loved. The man was permitted, if the boy agreed, to take the boy as his lover until he came of age. These relationships were expected to be exclusive, with both partners swearing to take no other (male) lovers.

As Japan progressed into the Meiji era, same-sex practices continued; however, there was a growing animosity towards these practices. The practice of nanshoku began to die out after the Russo-Japanese War. Opposition to homosexuality did not become firmly established in Japan until the 19th and 20th centuries, although it was only criminalized between 1873 and 1880.

== Terminology ==
Modern Japanese terms for LGBTQ people include seitekishōsūsha (性的少数者, "sexual minorities").

- dōseiaisha (同性愛者, literally "same-sex-love person")
  - homosekusharu (ホモセクシャル, "homosexual")
  - rezubian (レズビアン, "lesbian")
  - gei (ゲイ, "gay")
- ryōseiaisha (両性愛者, literally "both-sex-love person")
  - baisekushuaru (バイセクシュアル, "bisexual")
- toransujendā (トランスジェンダー, "transgender").

== Legality of same-sex sexual activity ==
There are no explicit religious prohibitions against homosexuality in the traditional religion of Japan, Shinto, or in the imported religions of Buddhism (see "Buddhism and sexual orientation"); however Chinese Confucianism prohibited homosexual marriage which may have also influenced Chinese Buddhism.

Sodomy was first criminalized in Japan in 1872, in the early Meiji era. But this provision was repealed only seven years later by the Penal Code of 1880 (commenced in 1882) in accordance with the Napoleonic Penal Code. Since then, Japan has had no laws against homosexuality. Thus, sexual activity among consenting adults, in private, regardless of gender and/or sexual orientation, is legal under Japanese law. Since June 2023, the age of consent has been set at 16 years.

== Recognition of same-sex relationships ==
Article 24 of the Japanese Constitution states that "Marriage shall be based only on the mutual consent of both sexes and it shall be maintained through mutual cooperation with the equal rights of husband and wife as a basis." Articles 731 to 737 of the Japanese Civil Code limit marriage to heterosexual couples. Same-sex couples are not able to marry, and same-sex couples are not granted rights derived from marriage. Also, same-sex marriages performed abroad are not legally recognized in Japan and bi-national same-sex couples cannot obtain a visa for the foreign partner based on their relationship, though the Ministry of Justice does have a general rule of giving the discretionary "designated activities" visa to same-sex married spouses. Japan and Italy are the only countries in the G7 where same-sex marriages are not performed.

In March 2009, Japan began allowing Japanese nationals to marry same-sex partners in countries where same-sex marriage is legal. The Justice Ministry instructed local authorities to issue key certificates, which state that a person is single and of legal age, to individuals seeking to enter same-sex marriages in areas that legally allow it.

In February 2015, the ward of Shibuya (in Tokyo) announced plans to establish a partnership system that would recognize same-sex couples for situations such as hospital visits and shared renting of apartments. This procedure allows couples to get a "proof of partnership" paper, which does not have any weight under Japanese law but can help in, for instance, getting access to a partner who is ill and in hospital but institutions are under no legal obligation to respect the certificates. The Shibuya system is considered a significant step towards lesbian and gay partnership rights in Japan. In July 2015, Tokyo's Setagaya ward announced that it would be joining Shibuya in recognizing same-sex partnerships from November of the same year. Since then, over 400 municipalities have begun issuing partnership certificates, including highly populated Yokohama, Osaka, Sapporo, Fukuoka, Kyoto, Kawasaki, Saitama and Hiroshima, as well as 30 prefectures, including Tokyo, Ibaraki, Osaka, Gunma, Saga and Mie.

On 17 March 2021, a district court in Sapporo ruled that laws or regulations that deprive same-sex couples of the right to marry constitute unlawful discrimination and violate Article 14 of the Constitution of Japan. The court found that Article 24 does not prohibit the recognition of same-sex marriages. The ruling did not legalize same-sex marriage in Japan, but is likely to step up pressure on the National Diet to act.

Yasuhiko Watanabe, a law professor at Kyoto Sangyo University, stated that if Japan recognizes same-sex marriage, that would impact the whole of Asia, proving that it is allowed not only in Western societies.

On 26 June 2022, a district court in Osaka brought down a conflicting ruling to the ruling from the previous year out of Sapporo. It ruled that a ban on same-sex marriage is not unconstitutional. The ruling did not change the legal status of same-sex marriage in Japan as it did not occur at a court with the power to set binding legal precedent. The plaintiffs have indicated plans to appeal the decision. Other similar court cases in other district courts in Tokyo, Nagoya and Fukuoka remain ongoing. In addition, the Tokyo metropolitan government recently announced a plan, set to take effect in October, to accept registrations from same-sex couples seeking certificates of their partnerships. On 1 November, Tokyo finally implemented a legally recognised relationship registration scheme for same-sex couples. In August 2023, Wakayama Prefecture proposed to locally introduce Japan's partnership system for same-sex couples.

In July 2022, Japanese video game company Nintendo announced its support for same-sex marriage and that it would recognize employees in same-sex partnerships as identical to opposite-sex marriages, in defiance of Japanese law. The company's policy has been described as a major action in Japan's increasing discussion on its same-sex marriage ban.

On 17 December 2024, then Prime Minister Shigeru Ishiba made the following statement about same-sex marriage during a parliamentary session: "I have met concerned individuals, and I can see that being together is the most precious thing to them. While there is no 'scale' for measuring the national happiness, I believe that fulfilling these deepest wishes would have a positive and beneficial impact on the overall well-being of Japan".

Sanae Takaichi, the Prime Minister of Japan and the President of the Liberal Democratic Party (LDP) since October 2025, opposes same-sex marriage. During a government budget committee meeting in 2023, she called legalizing same-sex marriage an "extremely difficult issue," though she added that "there should be no prejudice against sexual orientation and gender identity". In a subsequent statement during a campaign debate in September 2025, she told the audience she opposed same-sex marriage, adding that having a same-sex partner was "fine".

== Adoption and parenting ==
Same-sex couples are generally not allowed to legally adopt in Japan, though in some regions it is legally complicated. Lesbian couples and single women are unable to access IVF and artificial insemination. In December 2022, a "very broad and comprehensive fertility bill" was introduced in Japan - that explicitly and legally only allows heterosexual married women access to IVF treatment.

In April 2017, Osaka officially recognised a same-sex couple as foster parents, making it the first such case in Japan.

53 municipalities and Tokyo Metropolis have also established a "partnership family system" (パートナーシップ・ファミリーシップ制度, pātonāshippu famirīshippu seido) as of April 2023. This system, which allows registered partners to optionally designate children in the household through the partnership oath system in a limited form of second-parent adoption, also recognises the children of same-sex couples, and allows partners to make medical decisions for their child, and to pick up their children at schools and kindergartens (whereas previously only the biological parent was allowed to pick up the child). The first to establish this system was Akashi, Hyōgo in January 2021 followed by Tokushima in February 2021 and Adachi, Tokyo in April 2021. (Note: The 50 other municipalities are Koga (July 2021), Toyota (July 2021), Iruma (September 2021), Miyoshi (September 2021), Kawajima (October 2021), Kōnosu (December 2021), Sōja (December 2021), Hannō (January 2022), Hidaka (January 2022), Tokorozawa (January 2022), Mitoyo (January 2022), Ichikawa (February 2022), Anan (April 2022), Bungo-Ōno (April 2022), Kan'onji (April 2022), Kanuma (April 2022), Kasaoka (April 2022), Kasuya (April 2022), Kosai (April 2022), Miyashiro (April 2022), Okazaki (April 2022), Yoshimi (April 2022), Tosashimizu (June 2022), Tondabayashi (July 2022), Osaka (August 2022), Ichinomiya (September 2022), Toyoyama (September 2022), Naha (October 2022), Toda (October 2022), Ikeda (October 2022), Setagaya (November 2022), Nagoya (December 2022), Ichinoseki (December 2022), Wako (January 2023), Komaki (February 2023), Nagaoka (February 2023), Ranzan (March 2023), Kashiwa (March 2023), Takasago (April 2023), Namegawa (April 2023), Asaka (April 2023), Kasukabe (April 2023), Niiza (April 2023), Shiki (April 2023), Nachikatsuura (April 2023), Maibara (April 2023), Kaizu (April 2023), Matsudo (April 2023), Chiba (April 2023), Sapporo (April 2023) and Morioka (May 2023).)

== Discrimination protections ==
As of 2021, sexual orientation and gender identity are not protected by national civil rights laws, which means that LGBTQ Japanese have few legal recourses when faced with discrimination in such areas as employment, education, housing, health care and banking. According to a 2018 Dentsu Diversity Lab survey, more than 65% of questioned LGBTQ people said they had not come out to anyone at work or home.

The Japanese Constitution promises equal rights and is interpreted to prohibit discrimination on all grounds. However, homosexual and transgender persons can experience physical, sexual and psychological violence at the hands of their opposite-sex or same-sex partners, but receive limited protection from the law. Same-sex partners are excluded from the Act on the Prevention of Spousal Violence and the Protection of Victims (Japanese: 配偶者からの暴力の防止及び被害者の保護等に関する法律) (Note: Rōmaji: haigūsha kara no bōryoku no bōshi oyobi higaisha no hogo tō ni kansuru hōritsu) and generally lack safe places where they can seek help and support.

In 2013, Yodogawa-ku, Osaka, became the first Japanese government area to pass a resolution officiating support for LGBTQ inclusion, including mandating LGBTQ sensitivity training for ward staff. Naha followed suit in July 2015.

In October 2018, the Tokyo Metropolitan Assembly passed a law prohibiting all discrimination on the basis of sexual orientation and gender identity. The law, which took effect in April 2019, also commits the Metropolitan Government to raise awareness of LGBTQ people and "conduct measures needed to make sure human rights values are rooted in all corners of the city". The law outlaws expressing hateful rhetoric in public. Prior to this, the wards of Shibuya and Setagaya had already passed explicit protections for LGBTQ people.

In December 2018, four political parties, the Constitutional Democratic Party of Japan, the Democratic Party for the People, the Japanese Communist Party, and the Liberal Party, along with the support of several independents, introduced to the House of Representatives a bill entitled the Proposed Law on the Promotion of the Elimination of Discrimination based on Sexual Orientation and Gender Identity (Japanese: 性的指向又は性自認を理由とする差別の解消等の推進に関する法律案) (Note: Rōmaji: seiteki shikō mata wa sei jinin o riyū to suru sabetsu no kaishō tō no suishin ni kansuru houritsu an) to prohibit discrimination, harassment and bullying at schools on the basis of sexual orientation.

In March 2019, legislation banning discrimination against "sexual minorities" was passed in Ibaraki Prefecture.

Human Rights Watch, J-ALL (Japan Alliance for LGBT Legislation) and Athlete Ally urged Prime Minister Shinzo Abe to support legislation protecting LGBTQ people against discrimination on the basis of gender and sexual orientation. On 17 April 2020, 96 human rights and LGBTQ organizations sent a letter to the prime minister calling for the passage of a non-discrimination law.

In April 2022, legislation prohibiting discrimination among others sexual orientation and gender identity came into operation in Akita Prefecture.

=== Employment discrimination ===
While the Equal Employment Opportunity Law (Japanese: 男女雇用機会均等法) (Note: Rōmaji: danjo koyō kikai kintō hō) has been revised several times over the years to address sex discrimination and harassment in the workplace, the government has refused to expand the law to address discrimination against gender or sexual identity. The Tokyo Metropolitan Government has passed legislation banning discrimination in employment based on sexual orientation and gender identity.

Companies in Japan consisting of ten or more employees are required to establish work regulations. In January 2018, the Ministry of Health, Labor and Welfare revised the Model Rules of Employment (モデル就業規則) (Note: Rōmaji: moderu shūgyō kisoku) which "stands as the example framework for work regulations", to prohibit discrimination based on sexual orientation and "gender identification". Article 15 reads:

In addition to what are provided for from Article 12 to the preceding paragraph, employees are prohibited from any other forms of harassment at the workplace that are damaging to the work environment of other employees such as by way of speech or behaviour related to sexual orientation or gender identification.

=== Housing discrimination ===
In 1991, the group OCCUR (Japan Association for the Lesbian and Gay Movement) filed a court case against the Tokyo government after being barred from using the "Metropolitan House for Youth" the previous year. OCCUR won the case in 1997. While the court ruling does not seem to have extended to other areas of government-sponsored discrimination, it is cited by the courts as a civil rights case.

Since autumn 2003, the Urban Renaissance Agency, the government agency that operates government housing has allowed same-sex couples to rent units the same way as heterosexual couples at any one of the over 300 properties that it operates. This opened the way for more such action, as the Osaka Government in September 2005 opened the doors of its government housing to same-sex couples.

In February 2018, the Ministry of Health, Labor and Welfare created provisions addressing discrimination in housing, stating that "consideration must be taken to not deny lodging on the basis of sexual orientation or gender identity."

In October 2020, The Guardian reported that several Japanese love hotels were denying entry to same-sex couples for the sole reason of their sexual orientation, despite it being illegal since 2018 as per the guidelines issued by the Ministry of Health, Labor and Welfare.

=== Bullying in schools ===
In 2017, the Education Ministry added sexual orientation and gender identity to its national bullying policy. The policy mandates that schools should prevent bullying of students based on their sexual orientation or gender identity by "promoting proper understanding of teachers on … sexual orientation/gender identity as well as making sure to inform on the school's necessary measures regarding this matter."

=== Others ===
In January 2018, after a high-profile incident in 2015 in which a gay student at Hitotsubashi University died by suicide after being outed against his will, the city of Kunitachi passed an "anti-outing" ordinance to promote understanding of LGBTQ people. Mie Prefecture passed a similar "anti-outing" law in March 2021.

=== LGBT Understanding and Enhancement Act ===
In June 2019, after three years of consultations, a special committee of the ruling Liberal Democratic Party (LDP) announced the LGBT Understanding and Enhancement Bill, which aims to improve understanding of LGBTQ issues, would be introduced to the National Diet. However, LGBTQ rights activists criticized the bill for falling short by not mentioning same-sex marriage or anti-discrimination protections.

In April 2021, the LDP announced it would pass the LGBT Understanding and Enhancement Bill during the 204th National Diet session, set to end in June for the 2020 Summer Olympics and Paralympics in Tokyo. The bill only requires the government to "promote understanding of LGBT people" and does not actually ban discrimination. However, the bill was not enacted in 2021.

On 16 June 2023, the "watered down" private member's bill on enhancement of LGBTQ understanding formally passed both houses of the National Diet of Japan for the 49th G7 summit in Hiroshima, with majority support from the Liberal Democratic Party, Komeito, Nippon Ishin no Kai and Democratic Party for the People.

The Act on Enhancement of Public Understanding of Diversity in Sexual Orientation and Gender Identity (Japanese: 性的指向及びジェンダーアイデンティティの多様性に関する国民の理解の増進に関する法律), (Note: Rōmaji: seiteki shikō oyobi gender identity no tayōsei ni kansuru kokumin no rikai no zōshin ni kansuru hōritsu) LGBT Understanding and Enhancement Act (Japanese: LGBT理解増進法) (Note: Rōmaji: LGBT rikai zōshin hō) (in short title) came into effect on 23 June 2023.

== Transgender rights ==
=== Passage of the law on gender recognition ===
In 2003, a law was passed allowing transgender people to change their gender marker on legal documents. Approval required being over 18 years old, unmarried, undergoing sex reassignment surgery, sterilization (until 2023), and having no children under 18 (the majority age, which changed from 20 to 18 on 1 April 2022). The law, known as the Act on Special Cases in Handling Gender Status for Persons with Gender Identity Disorder (Japanese: 性同一性障害者の性別の取扱いの特例に関する法律) (Note: Rōmaji: seidōitsusei shōgaisha no seibetsu no toriatsukai no tokurei ni kansuru hōritsu) or simply Law 111, went into effect in July 2004, and was upheld by the Supreme Court of Japan in January 2019. By that date, 7,000 persons had legally changed gender. The court wanted to prevent "confusion" within parent-child relations, as well as "abrupt changes" in Japanese society. Two of the majority judges still issued a call for society to "embrace the diversity of sexual identity", also adding that the requirements were invasive and encouraged the National Diet to review them.

The legislation has been the subject of criticism on the grounds that its pathologising terminology and restrictive conditions violate the human rights of transgender individuals.

=== Socio-cultural background ===
Yale University professor Karen Nakamura notes in a discussion held October 2015 that "Japanese transgender activists present their gender identity as a disability in order to achieve more social and legal change in Japanese society", employing the medical diagnostic term of "gender identity disability" (性同一性障害, seidoitsusei shougai), instead of "gender identity disorder", which is more common in English-medium materials. This in part arises from what Nakamura calls a "translation fluke"; shougai can be fluidly interpreted as (among other things) either "disability" or "disorder". According to Nakamura, this is because there is a strong protection in Japanese society and laws for disabled persons; therefore, identifying more as members of the disability community rather than the queer community has allowed transgender Japanese to assert their rights in law and society more strongly without social ostracization, more so than cisgender LGB Japanese.

=== Conflict of private international law ===
Even though surgery is required as a condition to change one's registered gender in the Japanese courts, this only applies to Japanese nationals. Foreign nationals change their registered gender with the country of their nationality, then report the change to the Immigration Services Agency to be reflected on their residence card. This conflict of laws can lead to bureaucratic breakdown.

In 2018, U.S. national and Aoyama Gakuin University lecturer Elin McCready changed her legal gender to female in the United States. After the change, municipal offices in the Meguro and Ota wards of Tokyo refused to recognize it, citing her subsisting marriage to Midori Morita-McCready, a Japanese national - which the legal gender recognition would make a same-sex marriage. This led them to pursue a lawsuit against the local and central governments. Their attorney, Toshimasa Yamashita, said that following the precedent set in the 2018 Sapporo court case on same-sex marriage, this refusal was unconstitutional.

=== Other developments ===
On 24 February 2012, the Hyogo Lawyers' Association recommended that a transgender woman in a male prison be transferred to a female institution. According to this report, she had been placed in a male institution because of her legal sex, despite having undergone sex reassignment surgery prior to her detention, and was not treated as a woman in any way. She was subject to body checks by male staff, had her hair shaved, and was denied feminine clothing.

Since April 2018, transgender people have been covered for sex reassignment surgery as long as they are not receiving hormone treatment. The Ministry of Health, Labor and Welfare has also allowed transgender people to use their preferred names on their health insurance cards.

In June 2018, the Japanese Government enacted a new law lowering the age of majority in Japan from 20 to 18, which took effect on 1 April 2022. Among others, the new law sets the age of marriage at 18 for both men and women (previously women could marry at the age of 16) and allows 18-year-olds to obtain valid passports, credit cards, etc. The law also allowed people diagnosed with gender dysphoria and who have undergone irreversible sterilization to legally change their sex at the age of 18.

In October 2020, Human Rights Watch wrote a letter urging Japan officials to allow transgender women to enroll in public women's universities in the country. Ochanomizu University in Tokyo became the first public women's university in Japan to admit transgender women who had not changed their legal gender to 'female'.

In January 2022, a transgender individual was arrested for "using the wrong bathroom" in Osaka. The Osaka Prefectural Police has declined to pursue charges, instead leaving that decision up to state prosecutors. Mikiya Nakatsuka, professor of health sciences at Okayama University and president of the Japanese Society of Gender Identity Disorder, stated that most transgender persons in Japan "paid attention when they used toilets at public facilities so they [could] stay out of trouble", and expressed concern that this single case would be applied erroneously to the wider transgender community, creating unwarranted prejudice and discrimination.

=== 2023 Supreme Court ruling ===
In October 2023, the Japanese Supreme Court unanimously ruled that the part of the 2003 law that requires sterilization before a change of sex or gender on an individual's family register can be legally made was unconstitutional. The Supreme Court has asked a lower court to review the requirement to have "genitalia that closely resemble the physical form of an alternative gender".

=== Healthcare ===
Gender reassignment surgery has been covered by insurance since 2018. However, hormone therapy is still not covered by insurance.

The Japanese Society of Psychiatry and Neurology (JSPN) published its updated guidelines in August 2024 on the treatment of gender dysphoria. The guidelines continued to recommend puberty suppression in trans patients, noting that it "is medically self-evident that bodily features of the undesired sex will become permanent if AMAB individuals who would require puberty suppression do not receive it". However, they also asked doctors administering such treatment to report more detailed information on it going forward.

== Blood donation ==
Gay and bisexual men are allowed to donate blood in Japan following a six-month abstinence from sex while women and heterosexual men only need to wait six-months after being with a new partner of the opposite sex.

== Military service ==
The Japan Self-Defense Forces, when being asked about their policy toward people who are gay or lesbian following the U.S. debate during the presidency of Bill Clinton, answered that it was not an issue, and individuals within the forces indicated that as long as same-sex relations did not lead to fights or other trouble, there were few, if any, barriers to their inclusion in the armed services.

== Celebrities ==
While representations of homosexuals in the Japanese media tend towards caricature on the basis of stereotypes of sexual or behavioral deviance (e.g. the actually straight Hard Gay), there are several examples of transgender and non-binary celebrities in Japan such as Haruna Ai, Kayo Satoh, Ataru Nakamura, Kaba-chan, Hikaru Utada and Ikko. Several prominent musicians including Yoshinori Kanemoto and Ayumi Hamasaki have large LGBTQ fanbases as a result of their support for the LGBTQ community; among other activities, Hikaru Utada featured a gay teddybear called Kuma who she introduced as far back as 2010, and Ayumi Hamasaki headlined at Tokyo's 2018 Pride festival (incidentally, Hamasaki starred in the LGBTQ-themed movie Nagisa no Shindobaddo in the 1990s). In 2023, Shinjiro Atae came out as openly gay.

Various celebrities have dedicated airtime on radios and podcasts to LGBTQ topics and supporting LGBTQ issues. Sho Sakurai of Arashi held an interview with drag queens in 2015 in Shinjuku Ni-chōme and was given the nickname "Cherry Shoko in the Sky". Matsuko Deluxe is a famous and well-respected drag queen TV personality along the lines of Lily Savage (UK) and Dame Edna (Australia). The education specialist Naoki Ogi (more colloquially known by teachers across Japan by his nickname "Ogimama") has in past years given focus to LGBTQ issues in schools. Support for LGBTQ rights has been expressed by corporate executives and Olympic athlete Dai Tamesue. One of famous Japanese director Hirokazu Kore-eda's earliest movies, a documentary called "August without Him", released in 1994, follows Hirata Yutaka, the first openly gay AIDS sufferer in Japan. Filmed over a series of months, it contrasts his public life as an outspoken figure on the lecture circuit with his personal descent into illness and death.

== Political support ==
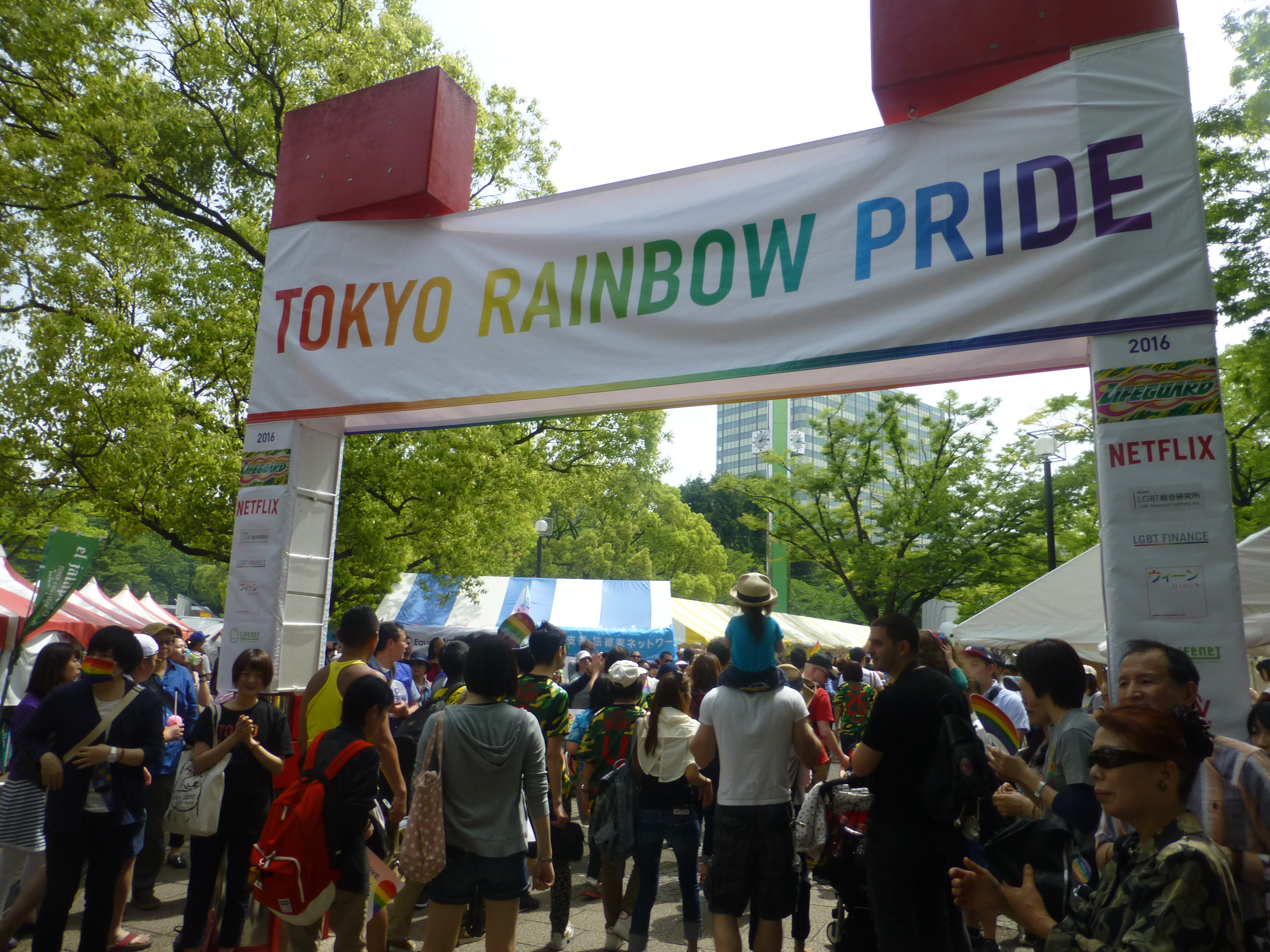
Tokyo Rainbow Pride in 2016

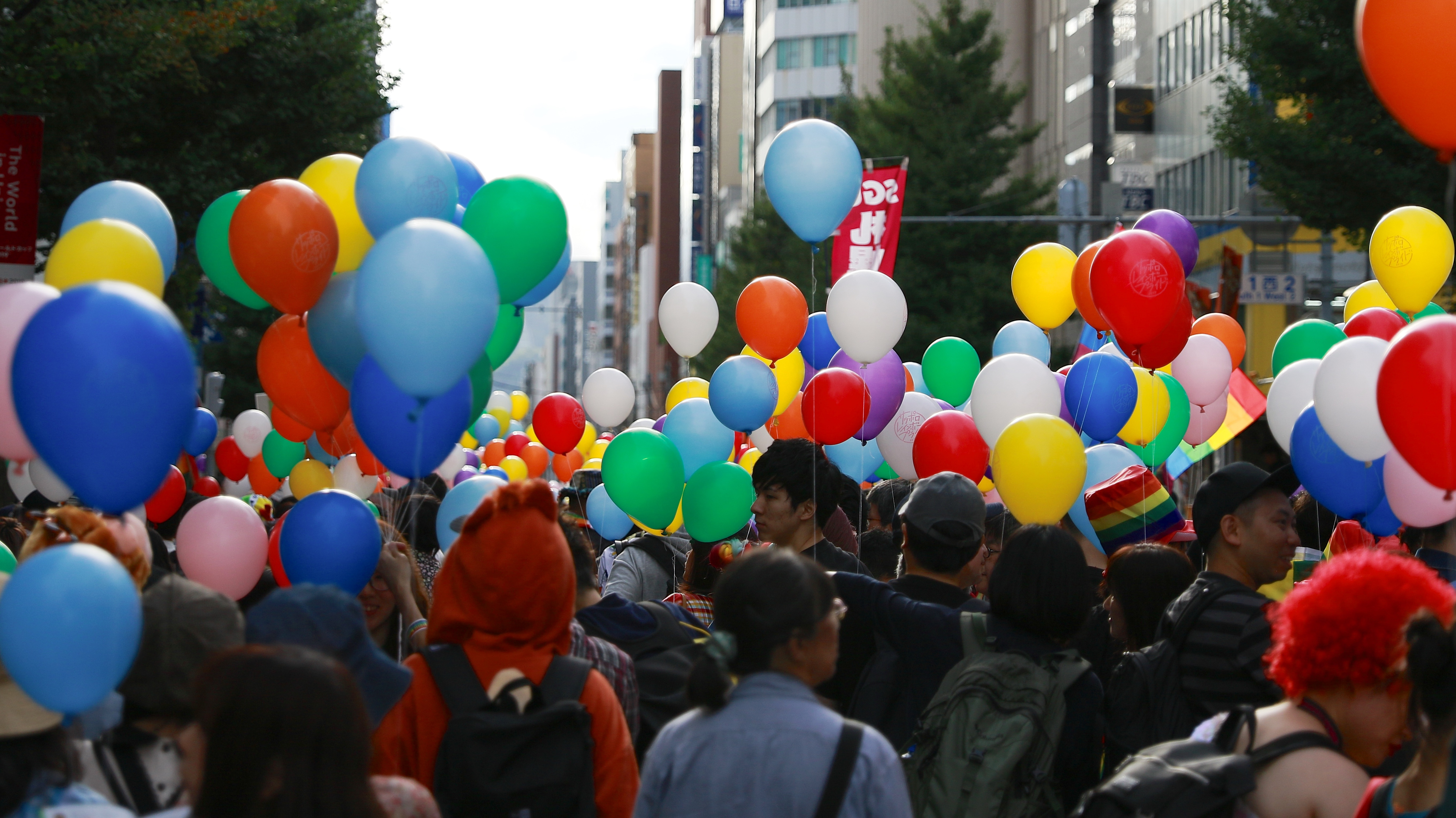
Sapporo Rainbow Pride in September 2019

Japan's society and government are predominantly conservative. Most political parties in Japan have formal positions in favor or against LGBTQ rights in their party's platform or manifesto. The Liberal Democratic Party (LDP) has indicated opposition to legalizing same-sex marriage, whereas the Constitutional Democratic Party (CDP), the Japanese Communist Party (JCP), the Japan Innovation Party, and the Social Democratic Party have indicated support for legalization. In a 2023 survey, Pew Research Center estimated that nearly 70% of Japanese people support same-sex marriage, the highest percentage of acceptance out of the Asian countries surveyed.

In 2001, the Council for Human Rights Promotion, under the Ministry of Justice, recommended that sexual orientation be included in the nation's civil rights code, but the National Diet refused to adopt the recommendation.

In 2003, Aya Kamikawa became the first openly transgender politician to be elected to public office in Japan, winning a seat on the Setagaya Ward Assembly. She initially ran as an independent but expressed support for the now-defunct Rainbow and Greens.

In 2005, Kanako Otsuji, from the Osaka Prefectural Assembly (2003–2007), became the first openly gay politician in Japan, when she formally came out at the Tokyo Gay Pride Festival. She later briefly served on the House of Councillors in 2013. Following the 2017 general election, Otsuji became the first openly lesbian member of the House of Representatives.

In 2010, Tokyo Governor Shintaro Ishihara faced international criticism for controversial comments he made, in which he said that gays and lesbians were "deficient somehow. It may be attributed to something genetic. I feel sorry for them being a minority."

In 2011, Taiga Ishikawa became the first openly gay man elected to office in Japan, winning a seat in the local assembly of Toshima Ward. He came out publicly in his book Where Is My Boyfriend (2002), and started a non-profit organization that sponsors social events for gay men in Japan. At the 2019 House of Councillors election, Ishikawa won a seat in the House of Councillors as a member of the CDP, the first openly gay man to do so. After his election, he vowed to legalize same-sex marriage and enact anti-discrimination laws within the six years of his term.

At the 2016 House of Councillors election, the conservative governing LDP included in its manifesto, that "same-sex marriage is incompatible with the Constitution". However, it also included "promoting understanding of sexual diversity" in its platform, a move that would have been "unthinkable" in earlier times and that lawmaker Gaku Hashimoto attributed in part to burnishing the country's international image in advance of the 2020 Summer Olympics in Tokyo. In 2019, former defense minister Tomomi Inada said she was unsure whether she would be able to introduce new legislation seeking greater tolerance of same-sex relationships amid opposition from her LDP colleagues. While Inada announced she wishes to "promote understanding" of LGBTQ people, she stated she is not trying to get Japan to legalize same-sex marriage or ban discrimination against LGBTQ citizens. Some LDP members have made controversial statements, such as Katsuei Hirasawa who argued in a speech in February 2019 that the "nation would collapse" if everyone were gay. Another ruling party lawmaker, Mio Sugita, published a magazine article in 2018 describing same-sex couples as "unproductive" because they do not have children.

In March 2017, Tomoya Hosoda was elected to the Iruma Assembly, in the prefecture of Saitama. Hosoda is believed to be the first openly transgender man elected to public office in the world.

During the country's 2017 general election, Tokyo Governor Yuriko Koike's newly launched Party of Hope pledged the elimination of LGBTQ discrimination in its manifesto.

In January 2019, trans woman Maria Akasaka became a member of the Kameoka City Assembly, in Kyoto Prefecture. In April 2019, another trans woman, Ayako Fuchigami, won a seat on the Hokkaido Prefectural Assembly representing Sapporo's Higashi-ku ward. She became the first openly transgender person to hold a prefectural assembly position in Japan.

In June 2019, the CDP added introducing legislation aimed at ending discrimination against the LGBTQ community and legalising same-sex marriage to its party platform ahead of the 2019 Japanese House of Councillors election.

In May 2021, Japan's conservative governing LDP has been accused of violating the Olympic charter after it failed to approve a bill to protect the rights of the LGBTQ community, during discussions marred by homophobic outbursts from conservative MPs. Closed meetings held in May to discuss a bill, proposed by opposition parties, ended without agreement after some LDP MPs said the rights of sexual minorities had "gone too far". An unnamed lawmaker described LGBTQ people as "morally unacceptable", while another MP, Kazuo Yana, said sexual minorities were "resisting the preservation of the species that occurs naturally in biological terms", media reports said. The failure to back a proposed law to protect LGBTQ rights was condemned by human rights groups, which said the party deserved a "gold medal for homophobia".

In July 2022, LGBTQ rights activists and supporters protested in front of the ruling Liberal Democratic Party's headquarters after an intra-party panel meeting circulated a booklet claiming that "homosexuality is a mental disease or addiction." The text was packed with false information, including "It's not the case that high suicide rates among LGBTQ people can be attributed to discrimination within society," and, "We should not legitimatize the sexual lifestyles of sexual minorities as it will become a social problem which will destroy families and society."

In 2023, Prime Minister Fumio Kishida of the Liberal Democratic Party met with LGBTQ groups in the Prime Minister's Official Residence and apologized for comments made by his former aide, Masayoshi Arai, based on homophobia and anti-same-sex marriage.

== Summary table ==
Same-sex sexual activity legal	(Since 1882)
Equal age of consent (16)	Yes (Since 1882)
Anti-discrimination laws in employment	No / Yes (In Tokyo, Ibaraki and Akita)
Anti-discrimination laws in the provision of goods and services	No / Yes (In Tokyo and Ibaraki)
Anti-discrimination laws in all other areas (incl. indirect discrimination, hate speech)	No
Civil unions	No
Same-sex marriage	No (Ban declared unconstitutional in some lower courts; adult adoption is practiced as an alternative.) (Note: Article 24 of the Japanese Constitution describes marriage in heteronormative phrasing.)
Recognition of same-sex couples	No / Yes (Several jurisdictions offer partnership certificates)
Stepchild adoption by same-sex couples	No / Yes (Some jurisdictions offer partnership certificates including identifying biological children of one partner)
Joint adoption by same-sex couples	No
Legal recognition of intersex people	No
Intersex human rights	No
Lesbian, gay and bisexual people allowed to serve in the military	Yes
Transgender people allowed to serve openly in the military	
Right to change legal gender	Yes (Since 2004; under certain restrictions: must undergo surgery, be unmarried, and have no children under 18)
Gender self-identification	No
Legal recognition of non-binary gender	No
Conversion therapy on minors banned	No
Access to IVF for lesbian couples	No
Commercial surrogacy for gay male couples	No (Banned regardless of sexual orientation)
MSM allowed to donate blood	Yes / No (6-month deferral period)

== See also ==
- LGBTQ rights in Tokyo
- Human rights in Japan
- Situation of homosexuals in the Japanese military (JSDF)
- LGBTQ rights in Asia
- LGBT and politics in Japan
