= TERF (acronym) =

Acronym for trans-exclusionary radical feminist

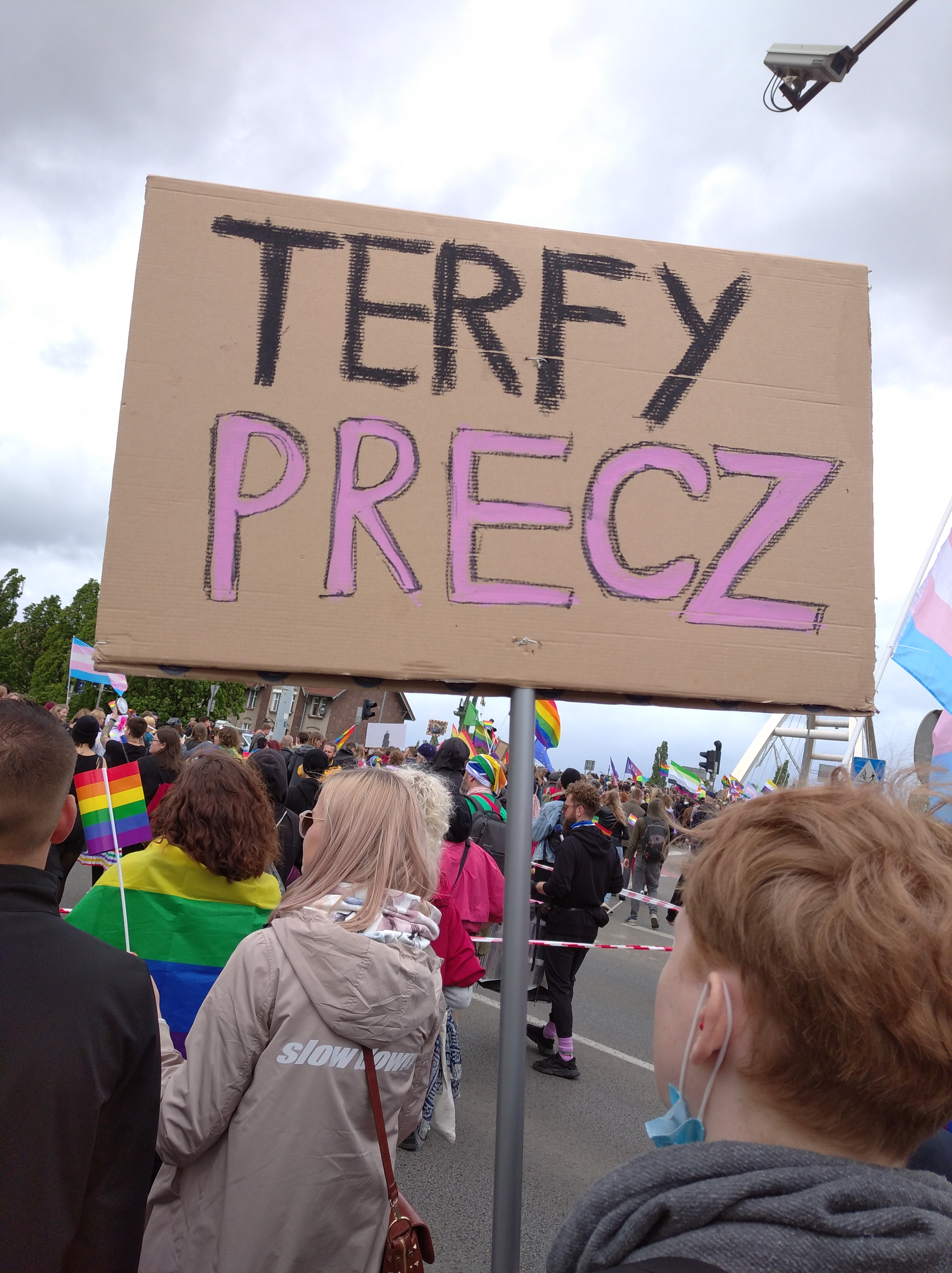
Polish: terfy precz, lit. 'terfs out', written on a placard at Equality March 2022 in Gdańsk, Poland

TERF (/tɜːrf/) is an acronym for trans-exclusionary radical feminist. First recorded in 2008, the term TERF was originally used to distinguish transgender-inclusive feminists from a group of radical feminists who reject the position that trans women are women, reject the inclusion of trans women in women's spaces, and oppose transgender rights legislation. Trans-inclusive feminists assert that these ideas and positions are transphobic and discriminatory towards transgender people. The use of the term TERF has since broadened to include reference to people with trans-exclusionary views who are not necessarily involved with radical feminism. In the 2020s, the term "trans-exclusionary radical feminism" is used synonymously with or overlaps with "gender-critical feminism".

Though TERF was created to be a "deliberately technically neutral description", the term is now often considered pejorative. The term has been widely adopted in academia. People labeled TERFs often reject the label, instead describing their beliefs as gender critical.

== Origin ==
Trans-inclusive radical feminist blogger Viv Smythe has been credited with creating and popularizing the term in 2008 as an online shorthand. The first recorded use of the term was in a blog post she wrote reacting to the Michigan Womyn's Music Festival's policy of denying admittance to trans women. In 2014, Smythe recalled that she and another user, "Lauredhel", had been privately using the term in private chatrooms before that blog post, and believed that it may have been adapted or adopted from an IRC discussion involving other individuals.

In the blog post, Smythe wrote that she rejected the alignment of all radical feminists with "trans-exclusionary radfem (TERF) activists". It was used to describe those feminists who espouse sentiments that other feminists consider transphobic, including the view that trans women are men, opposition to transgender rights, and the exclusion of trans women in women's spaces and organizations. These viewpoints have been alleged to be divergent from the majority of feminist organizations. In a 2014 interview with Cristan Williams of The TransAdvocate blog, Smythe – using her net-pseudonym "TigTog" – said:

It was meant to be a deliberately technically neutral description of an activist grouping. We wanted a way to distinguish TERFs from other radfems with whom we engaged who were trans*-positive/neutral, because we had several years of history of engaging productively/substantively with non-TERF radfems...

== Usage ==
Smythe initially used TERF to refer to a particular type of feminist whom she characterized as "unwilling to recognise trans women as sisters". She also notes that the term has taken on additional connotations and that it has been "weaponised at times" by both inclusionary and exclusionary groups. The term has since become an established part of the contemporary feminist language, but its usage is contested.

Cristan Williams writes in The SAGE Encyclopedia of Trans Studies that "the term has been rhetorically helpful in distinguishing TERF activism from the long-term radical feminist community members who are inclusive of trans women."

Several writers have observed that TERF can be used in broader senses to refer to trans-exclusionary feminists who are not radical, people with a certain kind of trans-exclusionary politics regardless of whether they are radical feminists or even things that are culturally associated with second-wave feminism in general.

Kara Dansky, a gender-critical feminist, stated that "many feminists have chosen to reclaim the term TERF".

The Oxford English Dictionary (OED) added an entry for TERF (noun) in June 2022, which states that although the term was first intended as a neutral descriptor, it is "now typically regarded as derogatory". OED editor Fiona McPherson explained that because "there is a little bit more nuance behind its usage – it's not always just a straight-out insult", the dictionary's editors opted to explain this rather than simply label the term "derogatory" or "chiefly derogatory". In 2023, the AP Stylebook advised journalists to avoid the term, deeming it "vague and politicized."

=== Slur debate ===
People who have TERF directed at them often characterize it as a pejorative or hate speech. In a July 2018 solicitation of essays regarding "transgender identities", British magazine The Economist required writers to "avoid all slurs, including TERF", stating that the word was used to try to silence opinions and sometimes incite violence. In August 2018, seven British philosophers wrote on the website Daily Nous that two articles by Veronica Ivy and Jason Stanley published in the journal Philosophy and Phenomenological Research normalized the term. They described the term as "at worst a slur and at best derogatory", and argued it had been used to denigrate those "who disagree with the dominant narrative on trans issues". In response, Ernest Sosa, the journal's editor in chief, stated that scholars consulted by the journal advised that the term could become a slur at some point, but that its use as a denigrating term in some contexts did not mean it could not be used descriptively. Transgender author Andrea Long Chu described the claim that TERF was a slur as "a grievance that would be beneath contempt if it weren't also true, in the sense that all bywords for bigots are intended to be defamatory."

In a 2015 article, American feminist scholar Bonnie J. Morris argued that TERF was initially a legitimate analytical term, but quickly developed into a defamatory word associated with sexist insults. She described the word as "emblematic of the unresolved tensions between our LGBT community's L and T factions" and called on scholars and journalists to stop using it.

British journalist Catherine Bennett has described the word as "a bullying tool", which had "already succeeded in repressing speech – and maybe even research". In 2017, British feminist author Claire Heuchan argued that the word was often used alongside "violent rhetoric", and that this violent language was used to "dehumanise women who are critical of gender as part of a political system", often lesbians. British clinical psychologist and medical sociologist David Pilgrim says that phrases like "Kill a TERF!" or "Punch a TERF!" are also posted by trolls online, and that there had been other depictions of violence aimed at women labeled as TERFs.

Transgender rights activist and former philosophy professor Veronica Ivy argues that just because the word could be used pejoratively, it does not mean it was a slur in general. In a 2020 paper published in the philosophy journal Grazer Philosophische Studien, linguists Christopher Davis and Elin McCready argued that three properties could make a term a slur: it had to be derogatory towards a particular group, used to subordinate them within some structure of power relations and that the derogated group must be defined by an intrinsic property. Davis and McCready wrote that the term TERF satisfied the first condition, but failed the third condition (an ideology is not an intrinsic group like race or sexuality), and that the second condition was contentious, in that it depended upon how each group saw itself in relation to the other group. Philosophy of language professor Jennifer Saul disagreed with categorizing TERF as a slur, arguing that a term does not necessarily become a slur when coupled with violent or abusive rhetoric. Her main criticism is that the term "trans-exclusionary radical feminist" is inaccurate, preferring the term "anti-trans activists" instead. Firstly because many people so-labelled are not at all radical feminists (citing J. K. Rowling as an example) and secondly that the term embeds the idea that radical feminists could work to "harm the interests of marginalized women".

Feminist philosopher Talia Mae Bettcher argued that, regardless of whether the term was accurately classified as a slur, it "has at least become offensive to those designated by the term", which suggested it might be best to avoid "in case one wants to have a conversation across deep difference". Feminist philosopher Judith Butler disputed that the term TERF was a slur in an interview with New Statesman, saying "I wonder what name self-declared feminists who wish to exclude trans women from women's spaces would be called? If they do favour exclusion, why not call them exclusionary? If they understand themselves as belonging to that strain of radical feminism that opposes gender reassignment, why not call them radical feminists?"

Serena Bassi and Greta LaFleur say that "the argument by trans-exclusionary radical feminists that the term TERF (an acronym for "trans-exclusionary radical feminist") is a "slur"— rather than a description of a particular approach to politics—leans on a "politics of injury" that distances itself from the real and very harmful work trans-exclusionary radical feminism is doing in the world."

== Semantics ==
Some authors such as Heath Rakes suggest that despite the moniker of feminism in the name, the viewpoints expressed by those described as TERFs cannot be considered feminism, or that the viewpoints actively constitute anti-feminism. Other theorists such as Emi Koyama argue that the logic of trans exclusion is fundamentally "incompatible with a feminism aimed at ending gender-based oppression". However, other academics such as Sophie Lewis and Greta LaFleur argue that trans-exclusionary radical feminism should not be understood as anti-feminism, but as a form of postfascist feminism, drawing analogies to other reactionary feminisms in history. Lewis argues that rather that attempt to "purify and absolve feminism" by understanding trans-exclusionary feminism as non-feminist or anti-feminist, feminism can be understood more broadly as "project that seeks to enlarge the sphere of action for a human female".

Other authors, such as Jennifer Saul, argue that the moniker 'trans exclusionary radical feminist' is a misleading term because of its invocation of radical feminism. Samantha Pinson Wrisley argues that the viewpoints expressed by trans-exclusionary feminists are best analyzed as trans-exclusionary reactionary feminism. She argues that the beliefs of trans-exclusionary feminism are "fundamentally antiradical, antiprogressive, and indeed reactionary" because this feminism frames the category of womanhood as property that needs to be protected.

Some people who have been called trans-exclusionary radical feminists say that trans-exclusionary is an inaccurate label, as they are inclusive of transgender men, who have a female sex assignment. Peter Cava notes that when these feminists are inclusive of trans men, they often gender them as women. Linguists Christopher Davis and Elin McCready view this "purported support" of trans men as a denial of their agency and self-determination, and suggest it is trans-exclusionary "because it excludes the very category of 'trans man'".

=== Gender-critical label ===
In the 2020s, the term "trans-exclusionary radical feminism" is used synonymously with or overlaps with "gender-critical feminism", which Grinspan and co-authors describe as a "self-definition by some individuals and groups labelled TERFs."

People labeled as TERFs generally object to the term and may refer to themselves as gender critical. In 2017, British columnist Sarah Ditum wrote that "the bar to being called a 'terf' is remarkably low", citing PinkNews's criticism of Woman's Hour presenter Jenni Murray and a Medium writer's blog entry about Nigerian novelist Chimamanda Ngozi Adichie.

== "TERF Island" ==
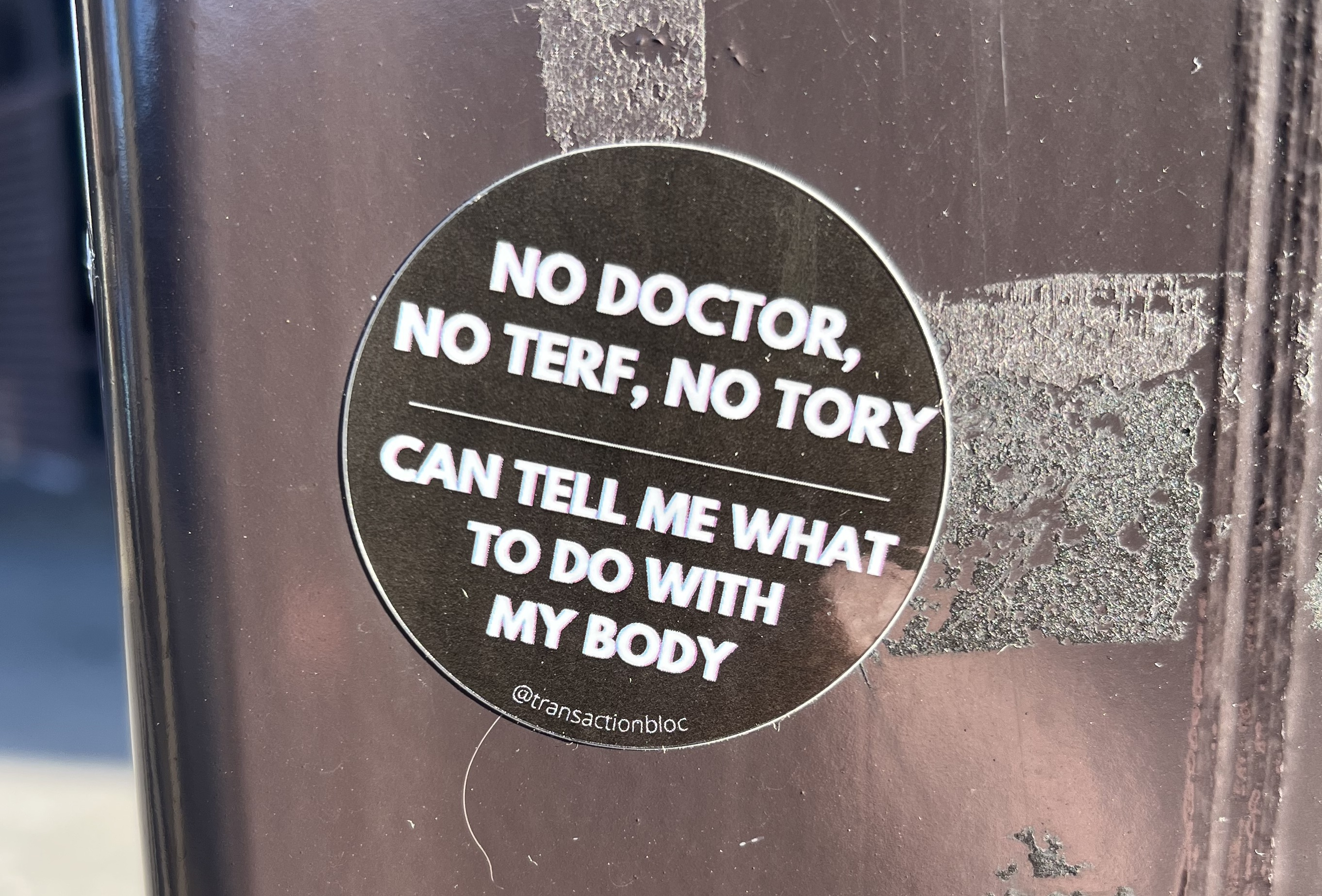
Anti-TERF sticker in the United Kingdom ("Tory" is another name for the Conservatives)

Some commentators refer to the United Kingdom, often in a jocular or droll fashion, as "TERF Island". The name references the perception that gender-critical activism and anti-trans rhetoric are particularly culturally prominent in the United Kingdom compared to the United States or other locations. In their 2024 book Who's Afraid of Gender?, philosopher Judith Butler explores this notion, as well as the history of the gender-critical movement in the UK.

== See also ==
- Anti-gender movement
- Feminist theory
- Feminist views on transgender topics
- Gender essentialism
- Lesbian erasure in relation to transgender women
- Radical feminist views on transgender topics
- Reactionary feminism
- Social construction of gender
- SWERF
- Transmisogyny
- Womyn-born womyn
