= Motokaji Station =

Railway station in Iruma, Saitama Prefecture, Japan

SI25 Motokaji Station 元加治駅
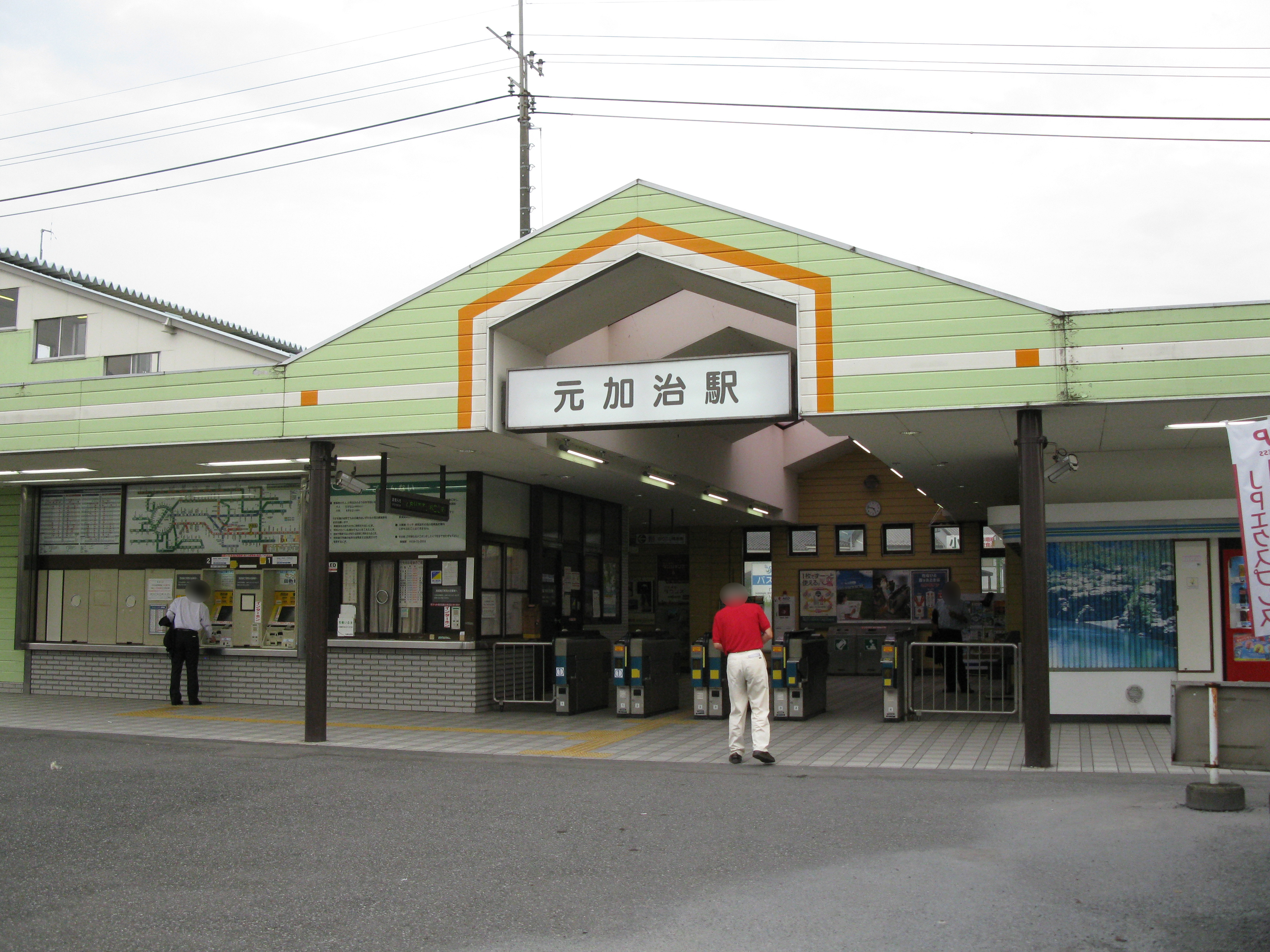
- Station entrance, August 2009

General information
- Location: 167 Noda, Iruma-shi, Saitama-ken 358-0054; Japan
- Coordinates: 35°50′26″N 139°20′44″E
- Operator: Seibu Railway
- Line: Seibu Ikebukuro Line
- Distance: 41.0 km from Ikebukuro
- Platforms: 1 island platform

Other information
- Station code: SI25
- Website: Official website

History
- Opened: 3 April 1926

Passengers
- FY2019: 7035 (Daily)

Services
Preceding station	Seibu Railway	Following station
Hannō SI26 Terminus	Ikebukuro Line Express	Bushi SI24 towards Ikebukuro
Hannō One-way operation	Ikebukuro Line Commuter Express	Bushi SI24 towards Ikebukuro
Hannō SI26 Terminus	Ikebukuro Line Rapid Semi Express	Bushi SI24 towards Ikebukuro
Hannō SI26 towards Agano	Ikebukuro Line Local	Bushi SI24 towards Ikebukuro
Location
- Location within Saitama Prefecture Location within Japan

Motokaji Station (元加治駅, Motokaji-eki) is a passenger railway station located in the city of Iruma, Saitama, Japan, operated by the private railway operator Seibu Railway.

== Lines ==
Motokaji Station is served by the Seibu Ikebukuro Line from Ikebukuro in Tokyo, with some services inter-running via the Tokyo Metro Yurakucho Line to Shin-Kiba and the Tokyo Metro Fukutoshin Line to Shibuya and onward via the Tokyu Toyoko Line and Minato Mirai Line to Motomachi-Chukagai. Located between Bushi and Hannō, it is 41.0 km from the Ikebukuro terminus.

== Station layout ==
The station consists of a ground-level island platform serving two tracks. The station building and entrance is situated on the north side and is connected to the platform by a footbridge.

=== Platforms ===
1	Seibu Ikebukuro Line	for Tokorozawa, Nerima, and Ikebukuro; Tokyo Metro Yurakucho Line for Shin-Kiba; Tokyo Metro Fukutoshin Line for Shibuya; Tōkyū Tōyoko Line for Yokohama; Minatomirai Line for Motomachi-Chukagai
2	Seibu Ikebukuro Line	for Hannō and Seibu-Chichibu

== History ==
The station opened on 3 April 1926.

Station numbering was introduced on all Seibu Railway lines during fiscal 2012, with Motokaji Station becoming "SI25".

Through-running to and from Yokohama and Motomachi-Chukagai via the Tokyu Toyoko Line and Minatomirai Line commenced on 16 March 2013.

== Passenger statistics ==
In fiscal 2019, the station was the least used station on the Ikebukuro-Hannō section of the Seibu Ikebukuro Line (76th out of 92 on the Seibu network as a whole) with an average of 7,035 passengers daily. The passenger figures for previous years are as shown below.

Fiscal year	Daily average
2000	6,735
2005	6,527
2010	6,784
2015	6,794

== Surrounding area ==
- Surugadai University

== See also ==
- List of railway stations in Japan
