= 2019 Hokkaido prefectural election =

← 2015	7 April 2019	2023 →

All 100 seats in the Hokkaido Prefectural Assembly 51 seats needed for a majority
- Turnout: 56.63% (▼1.98pp)
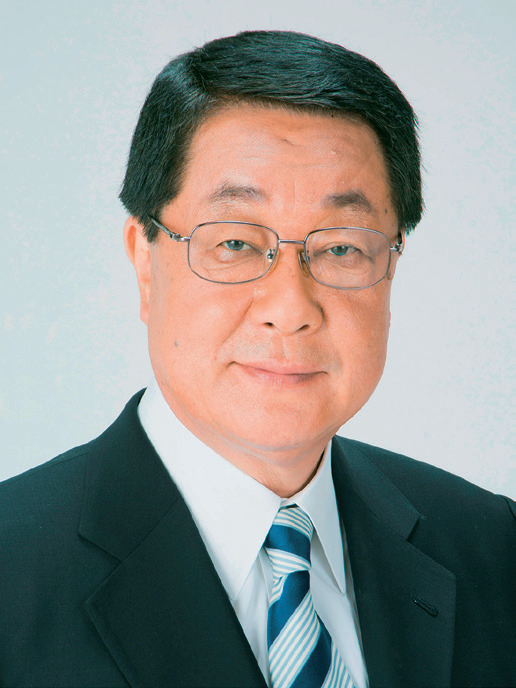

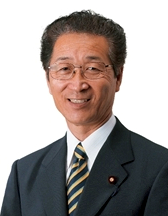

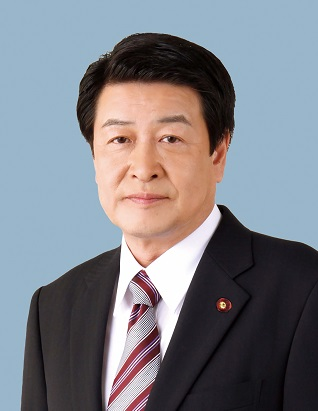
	First party	Second party
Leader	Takamori Yoshikawa	Takahiro Sasaki
Party	LDP	CDP
Last election	49	24
Seats won	51	24
Seat change	▲2	Steady
Popular vote	722,666	425,549
Percentage	42.50%	25.03%
	Third party	Fourth party
Leader	Hisashi Inatsu	Keiji Aoyama
Party	Komeito	JCP
Last election	8	4
Seats won	8	3
Seat change	Steady	▼1
Popular vote	157,365	159,827
Percentage	9.25%	9.40%
Governor before election
Harumi Takahashi
Independent
Elected Governor
Naomichi Suzuki
Independent

Prefectural elections were held in Hokkaido Prefecture on 7 April 2019 to elect the members of the Hokkaido Prefectural Assembly. It saw the election of Ayako Fuchigami, the first sexual minority politician to be elected to a Japanese prefectural assembly.

== Overview ==
The election was held as the four year term of the members of Hokkaido Prefectural Assembly ended. There were 134 candidates running for the 100 seats in the assembly, with 35 candidates in 21 constituencies being elected unopposed, the highest number in the history of Hokkaido Prefectural elections.

== Results ==
Party	Votes	%	Seats	+/–
Liberal Democratic Party	722,666	42.50	51	+2
Constitutional Democratic Party	425,549	25.03	24	0
Japanese Communist Party	159,828	9.40	3	–1
Komeito	157,365	9.25	8	0
Democratic Party for the People	25,107	1.48	0	New
Nippon Ishin no Kai	8,143	0.48	0	New
Other parties	7,143	0.42	0	–
Independents	194,640	11.45	14	–2
Total	1,700,441	100.00	100	–1
Source: Jichisoken
