= Bushi Station =

Railway station in Iruma, Saitama Prefecture, Japan

SI24 Bushi Station 仏子駅
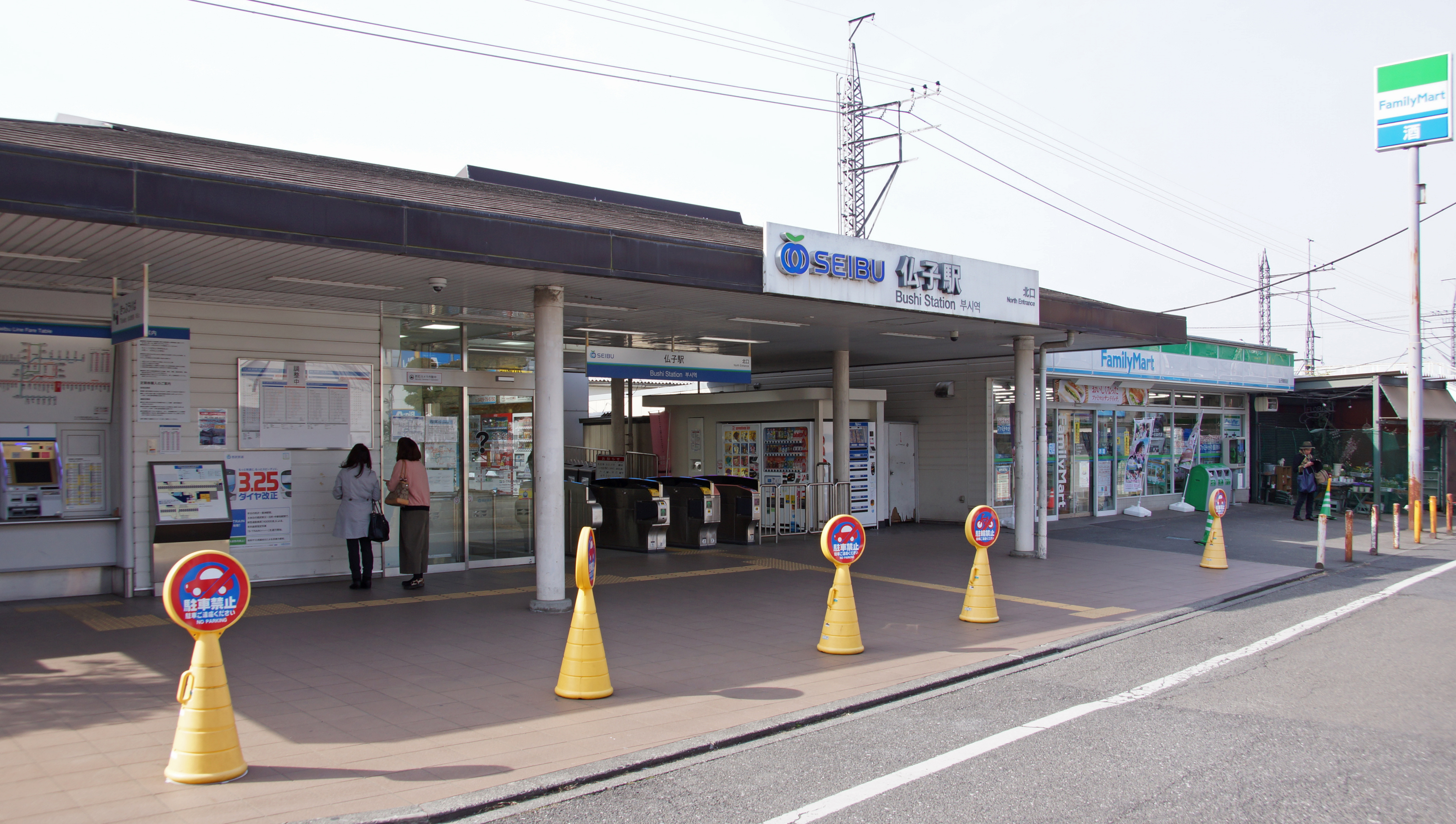
- Bushi Station north entrance in March 2017

General information
- Location: 880 Bushi, Iruma-shi, Saitama-ken 358-0053; Japan
- Coordinates: 35°50′16″N 139°21′36″E
- Operator: Seibu Railway
- Line: Seibu Ikebukuro Line
- Distance: 39.7 km from Ikebukuro
- Platforms: 2 side platforms
- Tracks: 3

Other information
- Station code: SI24
- Website: Official website

History
- Opened: 15 April 1915

Passengers
- FY2019: 10,879 daily

Services
Preceding station	Seibu Railway	Following station
Motokaji SI25 towards Hannō	Ikebukuro Line Express	Irumashi SI23 towards Ikebukuro
Motokaji One-way operation	Ikebukuro Line Commuter Express	Irumashi SI23 towards Ikebukuro
Motokaji SI25 towards Hannō	Ikebukuro Line Rapid Semi Express	Irumashi SI23 towards Ikebukuro
Motokaji SI25 towards Agano	Ikebukuro Line Local	Irumashi SI23 towards Ikebukuro
Location
- Location within Saitama Prefecture Location within Japan

Bushi Station (仏子駅, Bushi-eki) is a passenger railway station located in the city of Iruma, Saitama, Japan, operated by the private railway operator Seibu Railway.

== Lines ==
Bushi Station is served by the Seibu Ikebukuro Line from Ikebukuro in Tokyo, with some services inter-running via the Tokyo Metro Yurakucho Line to Shin-Kiba and the Tokyo Metro Fukutoshin Line to Shibuya and onward via the Tokyu Toyoko Line and Minato Mirai Line to Motomachi-Chukagai. Located between Irumashi and Motokaji, it is 39.7 km from the Ikebukuro terminus.

== Station layout ==
The station consists of two ground-level side platforms serving two tracks, with a bidirectional centre track in between the two platform tracks for use by out-of-service trains.

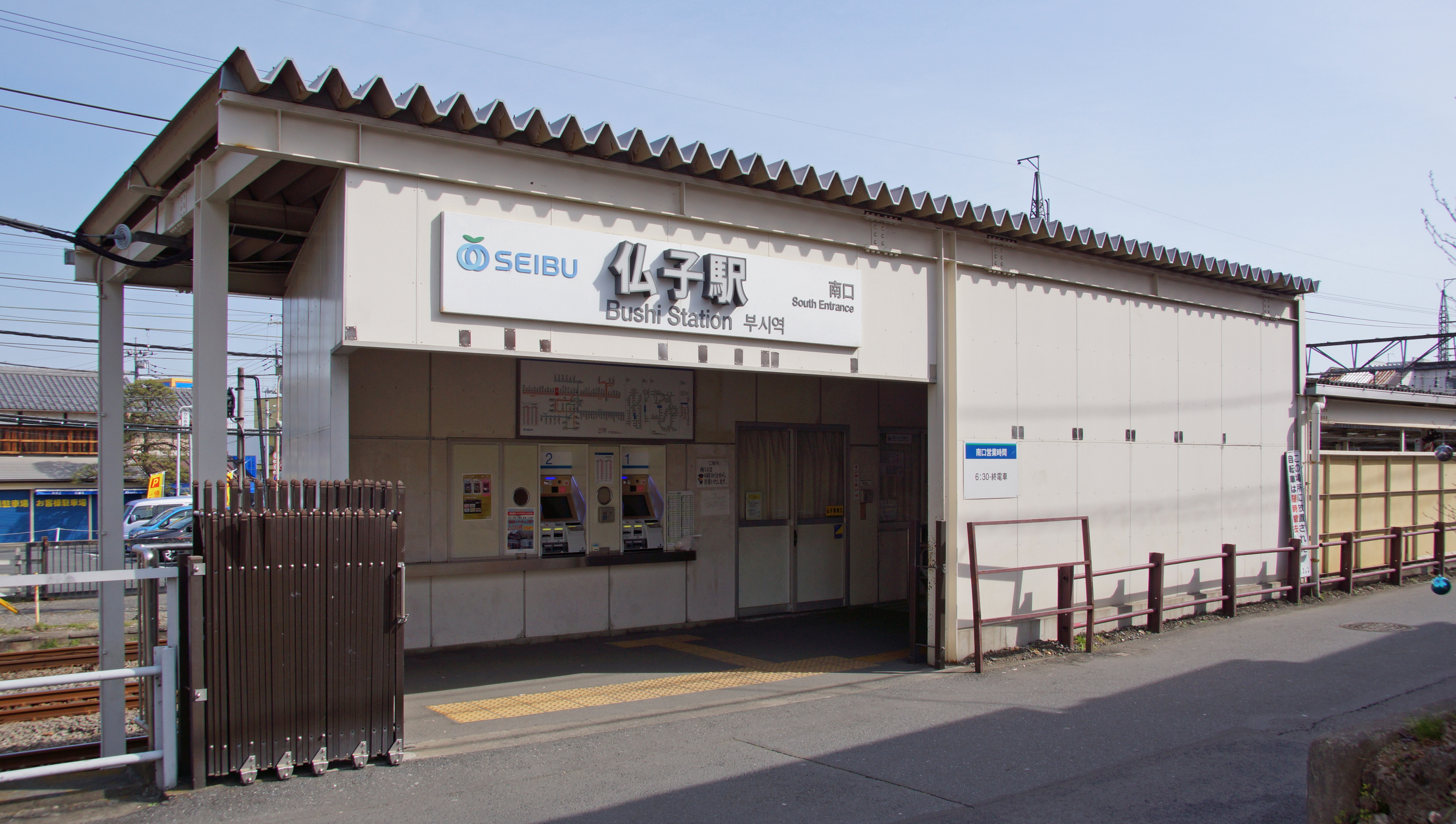
The south entrance in March 2017

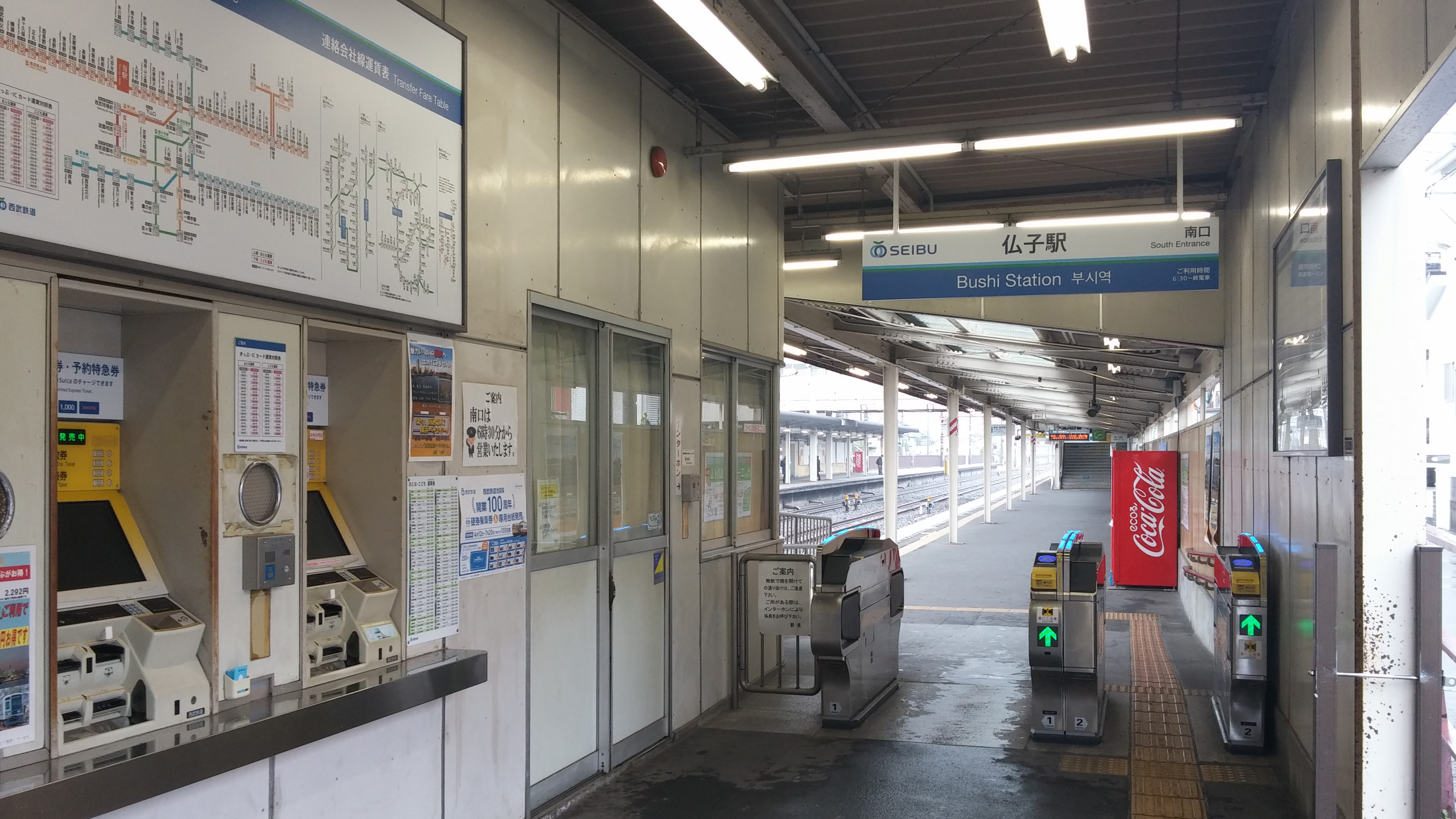
The south entrance ticket barriers in May 2015

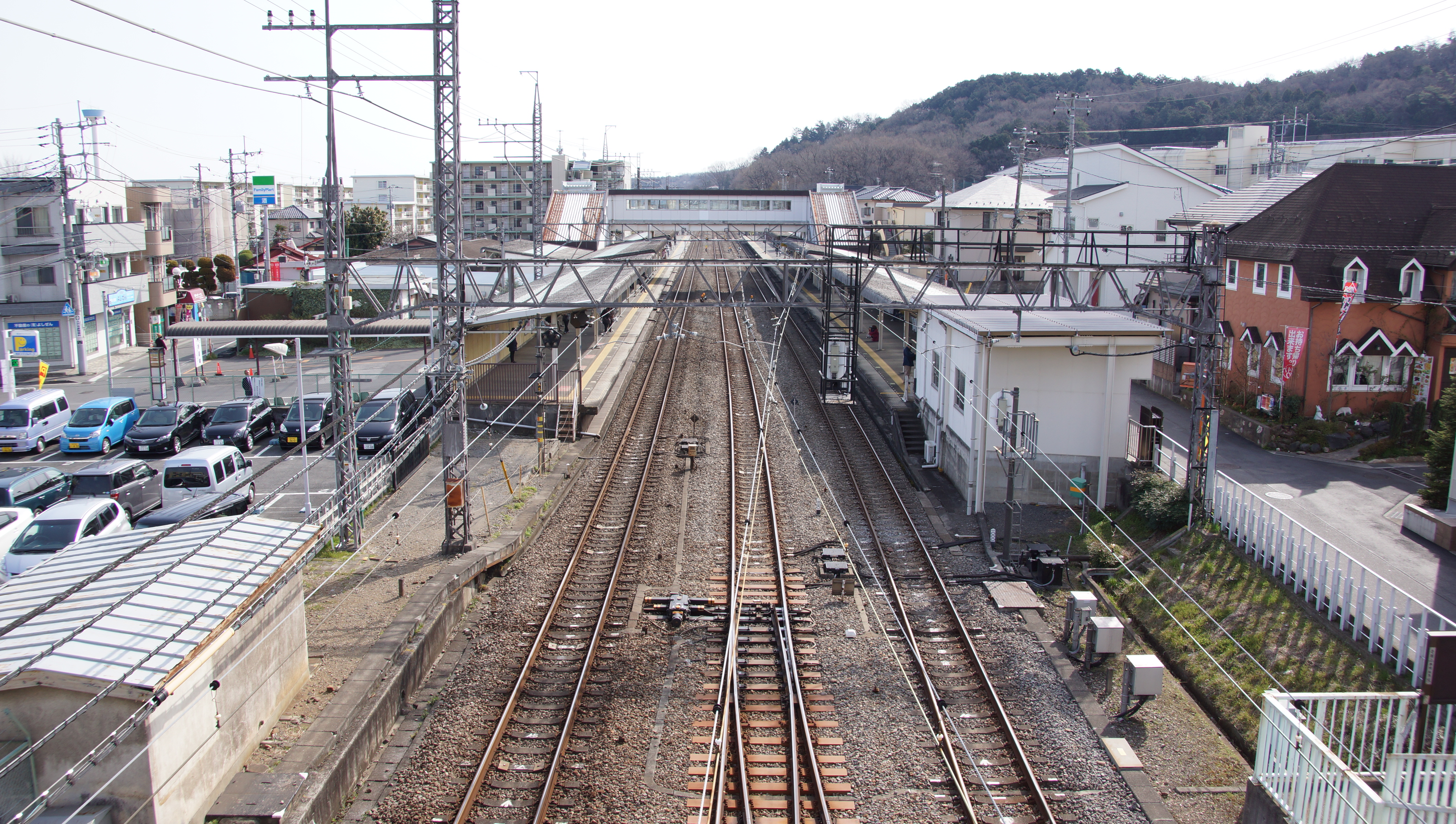
Overview of the station looking east in March 2017

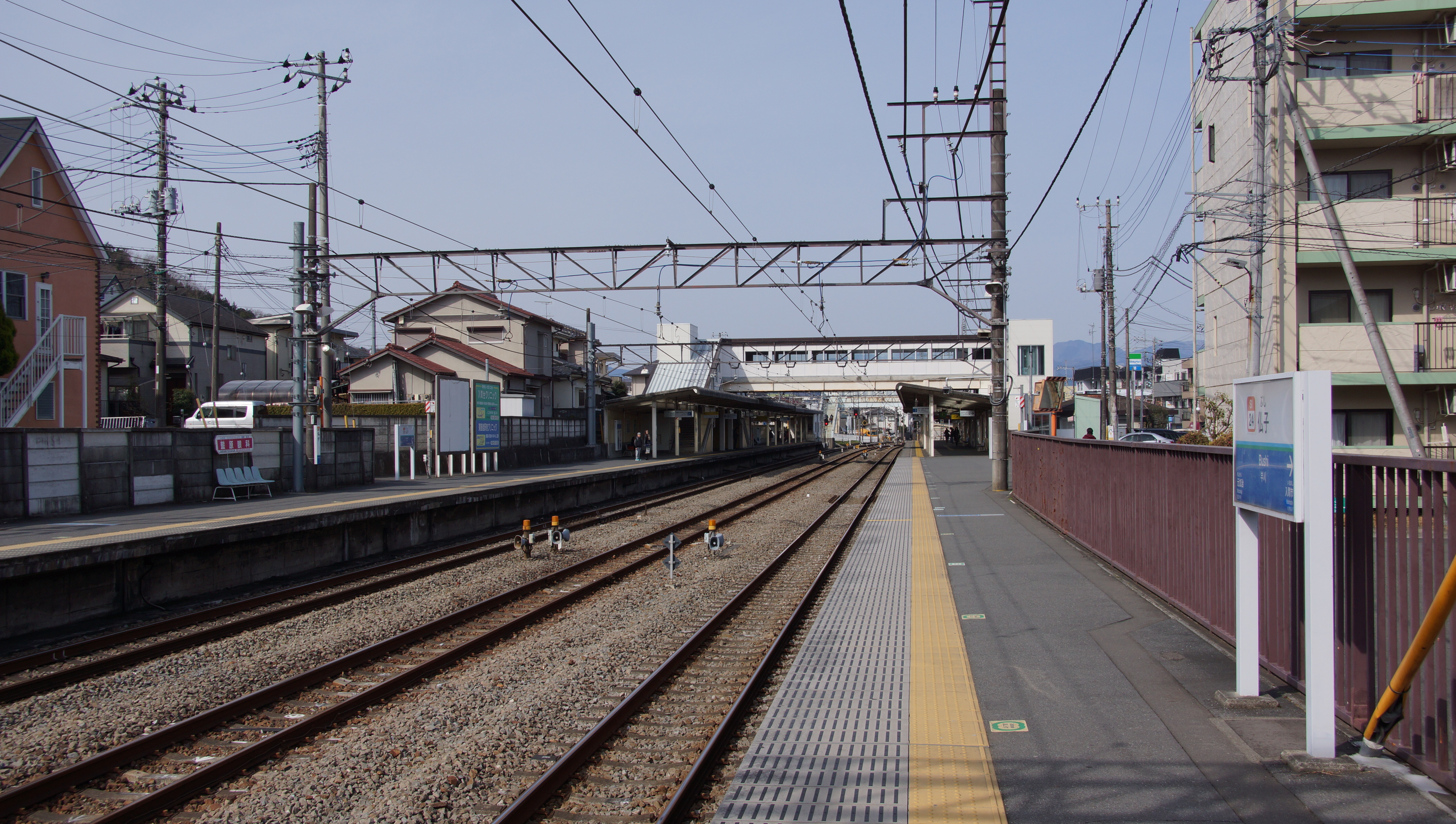
The platforms in March 2017

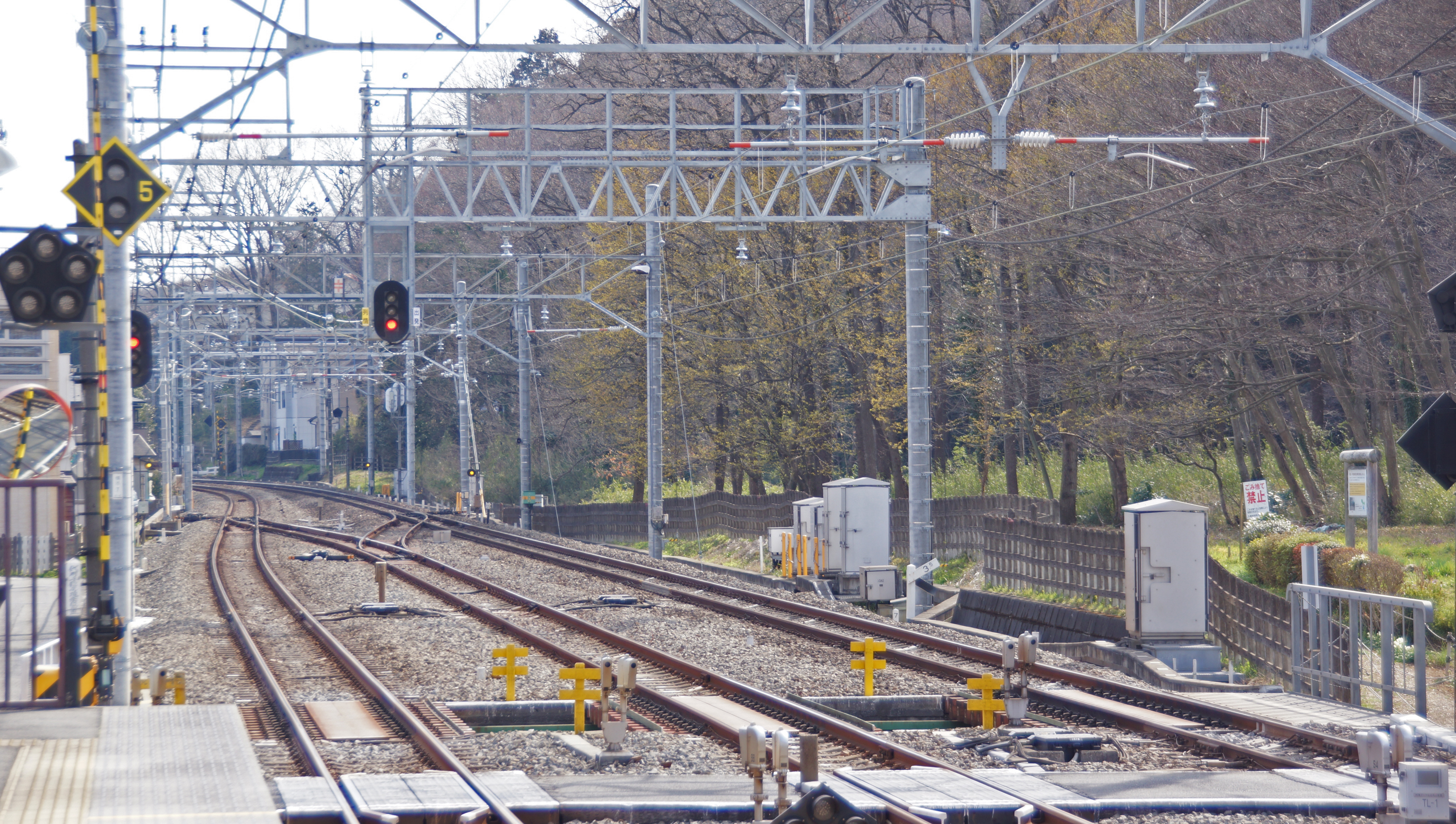
The view from the east end of the platforms in March 2017

=== Platforms ===
1	Seibu Ikebukuro Line	for Tokorozawa, Nerima, and Ikebukuro; Tokyo Metro Yurakucho Line for Shin-Kiba; Tokyo Metro Fukutoshin Line for Shibuya; Tōkyū Tōyoko Line for Yokohama; Minatomirai Line for Motomachi-Chukagai
2	Seibu Ikebukuro Line	for Hannō and Seibu-Chichibu

== History ==
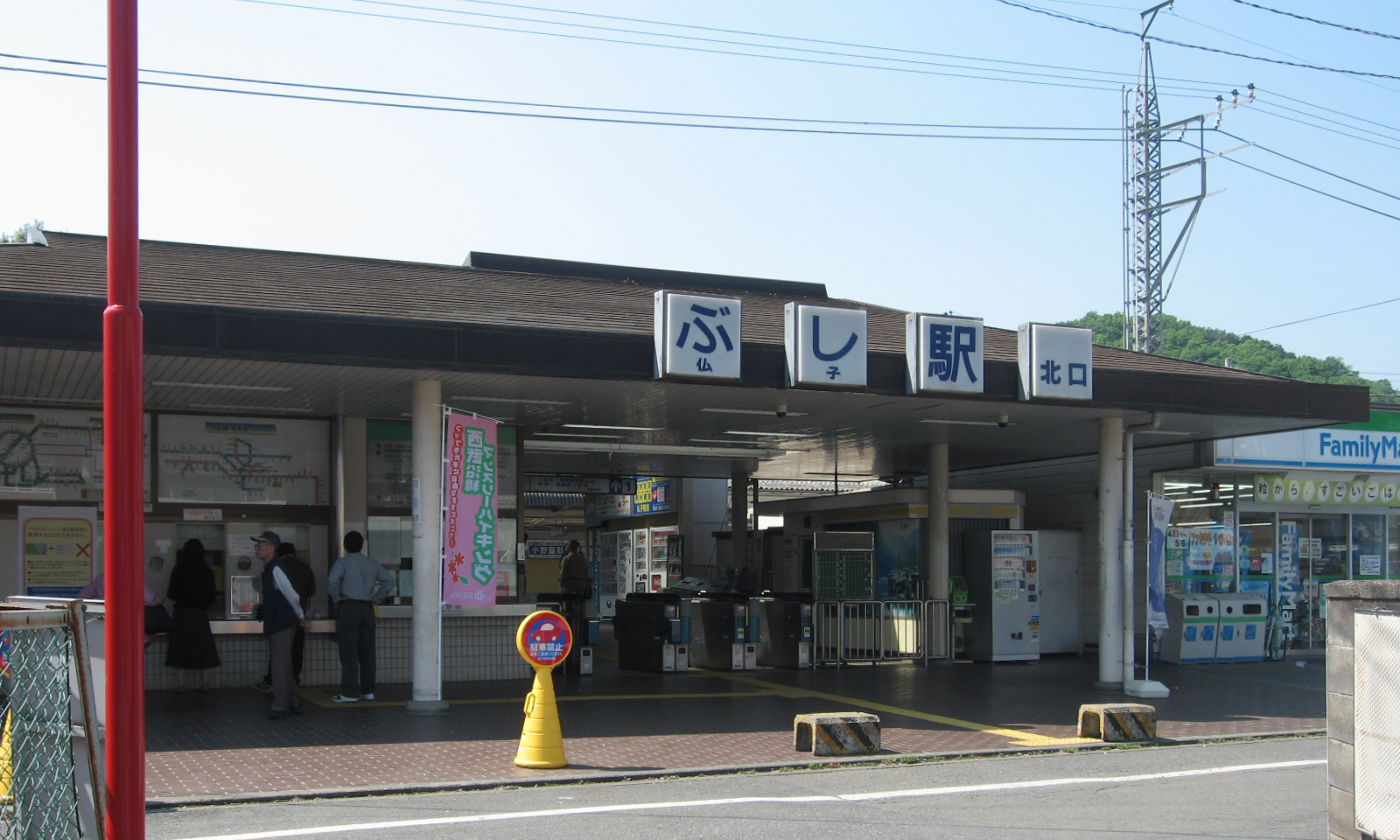
The north entrance in May 2007

The station opened on 15 April 1915.

Station numbering was introduced on all Seibu Railway lines during fiscal 2012, with Bushi Station becoming "SI24".

Through-running to and from Yokohama and Motomachi-Chukagai via the Tokyu Toyoko Line and Minatomirai Line commenced on 16 March 2013.

== Passenger statistics ==
In fiscal 2019, the station was the 67th busiest on the Seibu network with an average of 10,879 passengers daily. The passenger figures for previous years are as shown below. Bushi station was the only station on the Ikebukuro-Hannō section of the Seibu Ikebukuro Line to see a decrease in the number of users between fiscal 2012 and 2013. The passenger figures for previous years are as shown below.

Fiscal year	Daily average
2000	16,349
2005	14,856
2010	13,283
2015	13,235

== Surrounding area ==
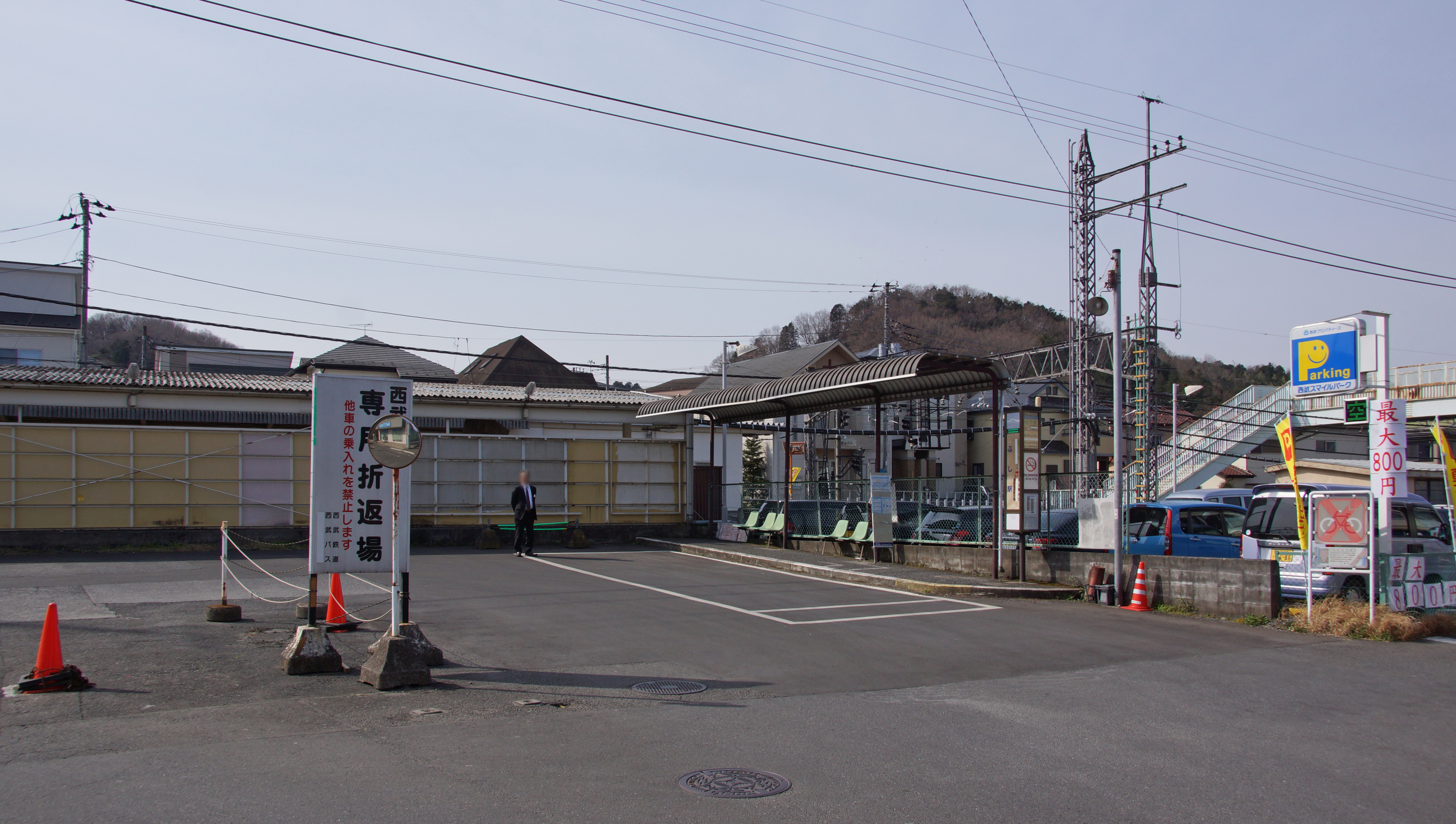
The bus stop on the north side of the station in March 2017

- Musashino Academia Musicae Iruma Campus
- Musashino Academia Musicae High School
- Iruma Seibu Junior High School
- Iruma Bushi Elementary School

== See also ==
- List of railway stations in Japan
