= Aya Kamikawa =

Japanese politician (born 1968)

- 上川 あや
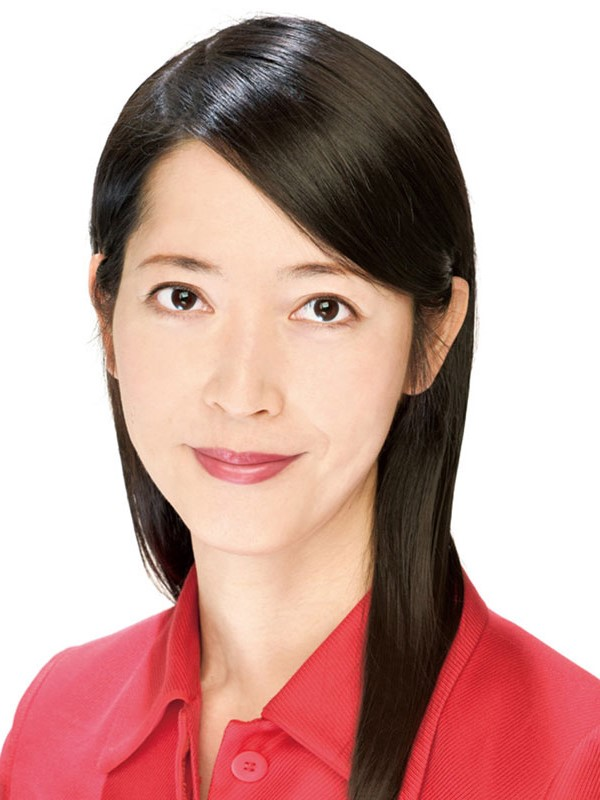
- Kamikawa in 2015

Member of the Setagaya Ward Assembly
- Incumbent
- Assumed office May 1, 2003

Personal details
- Born: January 25, 1968 (age 58) Taitō Ward, Tokyo, Japan
- Party: Independent
- Education: Hosei University
- Occupation: Politician
- Website: Setagaya Ward Council Member Kamikawa Aya

Aya Kamikawa (上川 あや, Kamikawa Aya; born January 25, 1968) is a Tokyo municipal official. With her election in April 2003, she became the first openly transgender person to seek or win elected office in Japan.

== Life ==
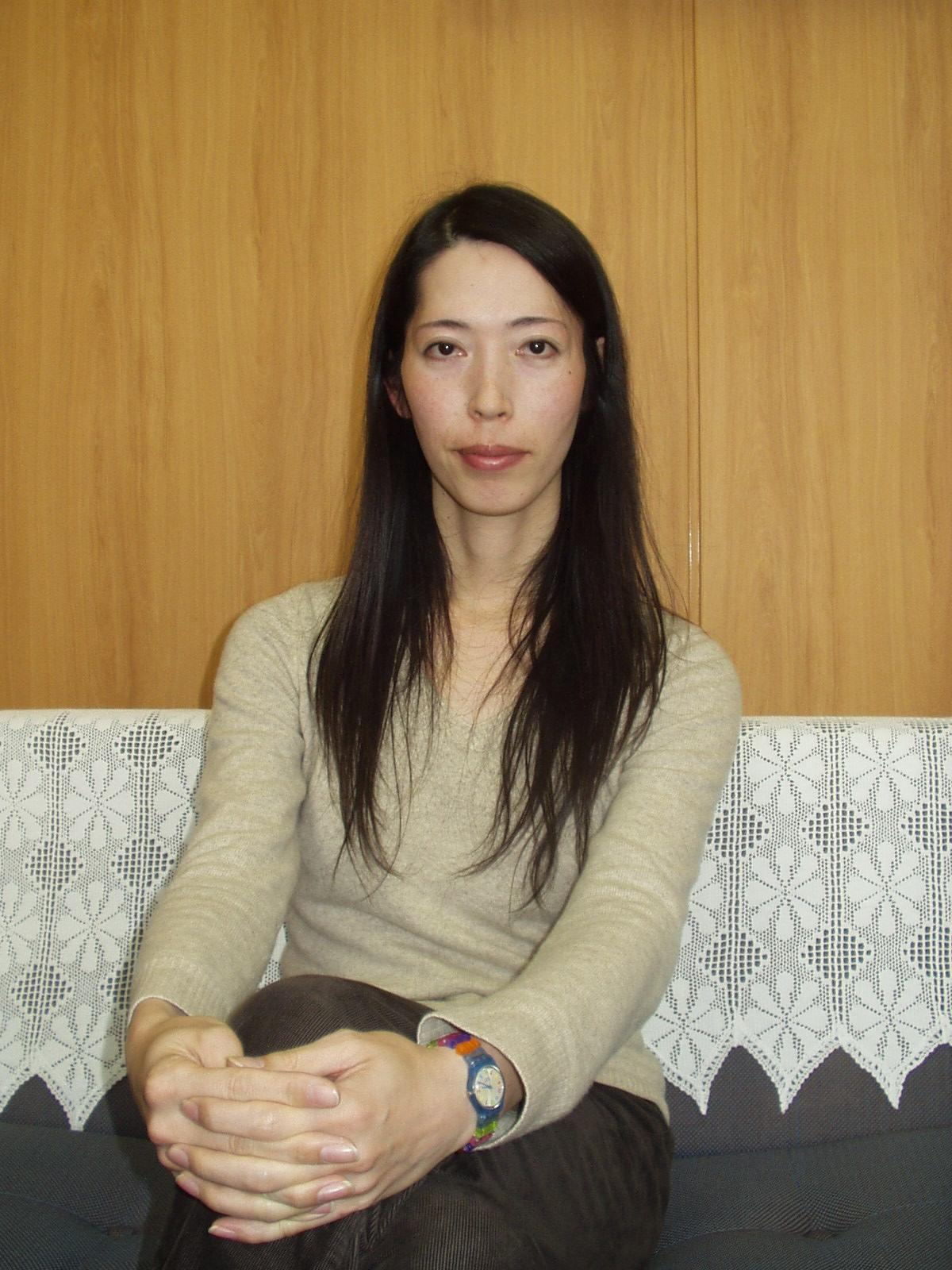
Kamikawa in 2007

Aya Kamikawa was born on January 25, 1968, in Tokyo's Taitō Ward. She is the second child of three. She attended Hosei University Second Senior High School, an all-boys school.

In 1990, Kamikawa graduated from Hosei University with a degree in Business Administration. She began to work in the field of public relations whilst presenting masculine. In 1995, she resigned from her post, citing stress associated with gender dysphoria, and began hormone replacement therapy. In 1998, she was diagnosed with gender identity disorder by a psychiatrist. In 1999, she started working at a private company whilst presenting feminine. She also changed her name to Aya that same year.

In 2003, Kamikawa, then a 35-year-old writer, submitted her election application papers with a blank space for "sex". She won a four-year term as an independent under huge media attention, placing sixth of 72 candidates running for 52 seats in the Setagaya ward assembly, the most populous district in Tokyo. Despite the government counting her win as part of the number of men elected to public office, she stated that she would work as a woman. Her platform was to improve rights for women, children, the elderly, the handicapped, and lesbian, gay, bisexual, and transgender (LGBT) people.

In 2005, subsequent to the passage of Japan's GID law, Kamikawa was finally able to change the sex designator on her koseki to female.

Kamikawa was the only openly transgender official in Japan until the 2017 election of Tomoya Hosoda.

== Bibliography ==
- The Courage to Change (変えてゆく勇気 :「性同一性障害」の私から, Kaete yuku yūki: "sei dōitsusei shōgai" no watakushi kara), Inawami Shoten, 2007, ISBN 9784004310648

== See also ==
- List of transgender people
- LGBT culture in Tokyo
- Ayako Fuchigami
