= Irumashi Station =

Railway station in Iruma, Saitama Prefecture, Japan

SI23 Irumashi Station 入間市駅
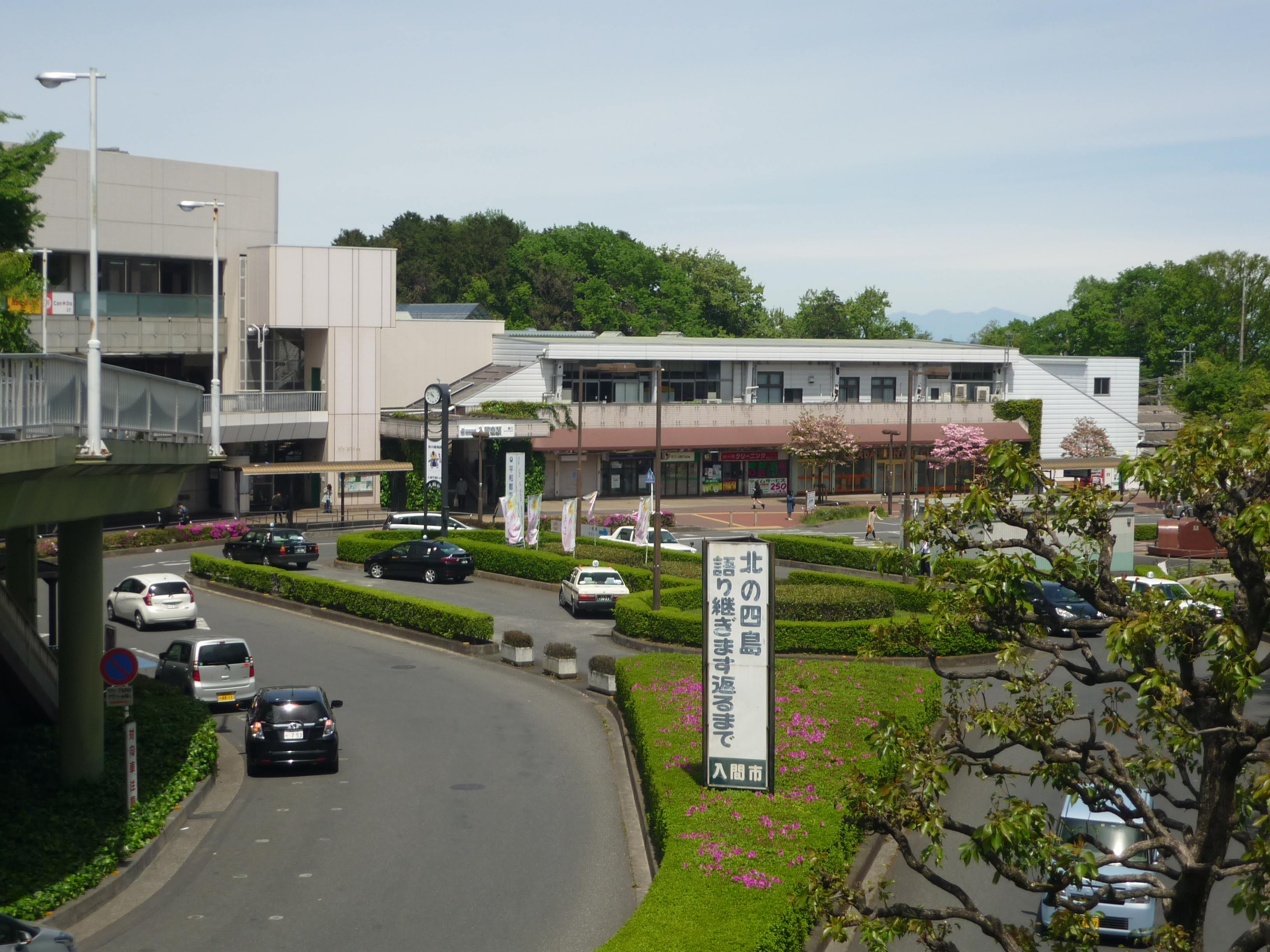
- Irumashi Station south exit in July 2019

General information
- Location: 2-1 Kawaramachi, Iruma-shi, Saitama-ken 358-0008; Japan
- Coordinates: 35°50′35″N 139°23′25″E
- Operator: Seibu Railway
- Line: Seibu Ikebukuro Line
- Distance: 36.8 km from Ikebukuro
- Platforms: 1 side + 2 island platforms
- Connections: Bus terminal

Other information
- Station code: SI23
- Website: Official website

History
- Opened: 15 April 1915
- Former names: Toyookamachi (until 1967)

Passengers
- FY2019: 33,713 daily
Services
Preceding station	Seibu Railway	Following station
Hannō SI26 towards Seibu-Chichibu	Chichibu	Tokorozawa SI17 towards Ikebukuro
Hannō SI26 Terminus	Musashi	Tokorozawa SI17 towards Ikebukuro
Hannō SI26 towards Seibu-Chichibu	S-Train Weekends (Weekends and national holidays)	Tokorozawa SI17 towards Motomachi-Chūkagai
Hannō SI26 Terminus	F Liner	Kotesashi SI19 towards Motomachi-Chūkagai
Hannō SI26 Terminus	Ikebukuro Line Rapid Express	Kotesashi SI19 towards Ikebukuro or Nerima
Bushi SI24 towards Hannō	Ikebukuro Line Express	Inariyama-kōen SI22 towards Ikebukuro
Bushi One-way operation	Ikebukuro Line Commuter Express	Inariyama-kōen SI22 towards Ikebukuro
Bushi SI24 towards Hannō	Ikebukuro Line Rapid Semi Express	Inariyama-kōen SI22 towards Ikebukuro
Bushi SI24 towards Agano	Ikebukuro Line Local	Inariyama-kōen SI22 towards Ikebukuro
Location
- Location within Saitama Prefecture

Irumashi Station (入間市駅, Irumashi-eki) is a passenger railway station located in the city of Iruma, Saitama, Japan, operated by the private railway operator Seibu Railway.

== Lines ==
Irumashi Station is served by the Seibu Ikebukuro Line from Ikebukuro in Tokyo, with some services inter-running via the Tokyo Metro Yurakucho Line to Shin-Kiba and the Tokyo Metro Fukutoshin Line to Shibuya and onward via the Tokyu Toyoko Line and Minato Mirai Line to Motomachi-Chukagai. Located between Inariyama-kōen and Bushi, it is 36.8 km from the Ikebukuro terminus.

== Station layout ==
The station consists of a ground-level side platform and two island platforms, serving a total of four tracks.

=== Platforms ===
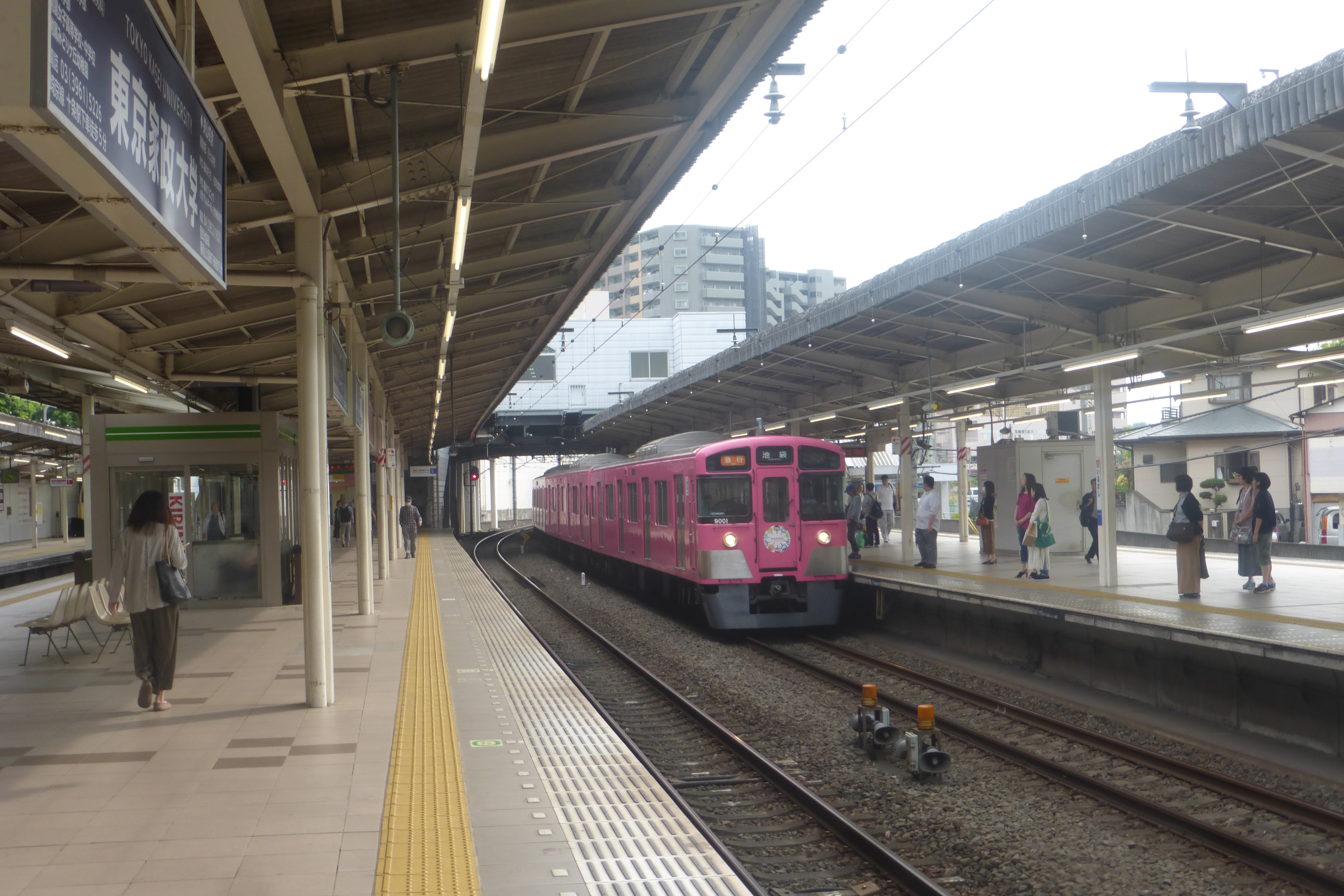
The platforms and a train in May 2017

1	■ Discontinued
2/3	Seibu Ikebukuro Line	for Hannō and Seibu-Chichibu
4/5	Seibu Ikebukuro Line	for Tokorozawa, Nerima, and Ikebukuro; Tokyo Metro Yurakucho Line for Shin-Kiba; Tokyo Metro Fukutoshin Line for Shibuya; Tōkyū Tōyoko Line for Yokohama; Minatomirai Line for Motomachi-Chukagai

Platforms 1 and 2 share the same track. Limited express trains usually stop at Platform 2 in the down direction and Platform 5 in the up direction.

== History ==
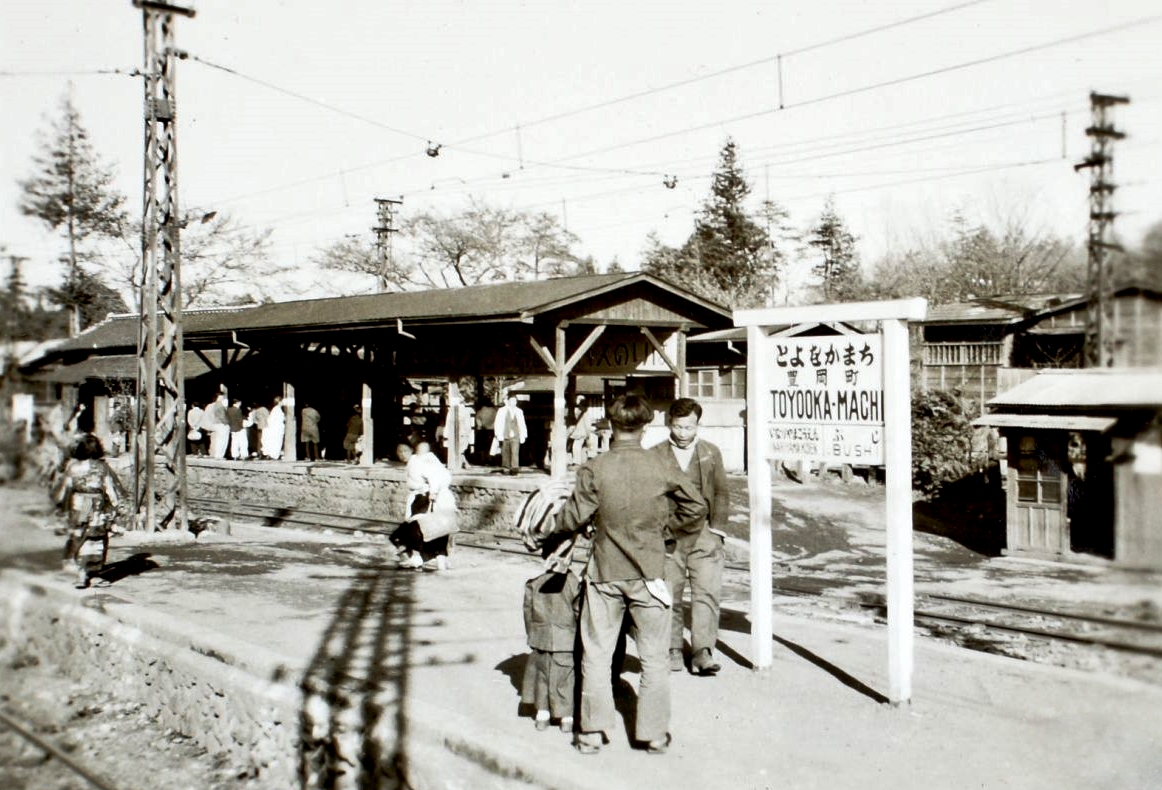
Toyookamachi Station after the end of World War II

The station opened on 15 April 1915 as Toyooka-machi Station (豊岡町駅). It was renamed Irumashi on 1 April 1967.

Station numbering was introduced on all Seibu Railway lines during fiscal 2012, with Irumashi Station becoming "SI23".

Through-running to and from Yokohama and Motomachi-Chukagai via the Tokyu Toyoko Line and Minatomirai Line commenced on 16 March 2013.

== Passenger statistics ==
In fiscal 2019, the station was the 28th busiest on the Seibu network with an average of 33,713 passengers daily. The passenger figures for previous years are as shown below.

Fiscal year	Daily average
2000	35,092
2009	36,331
2010	35,706
2015	34,306

== Surrounding area ==
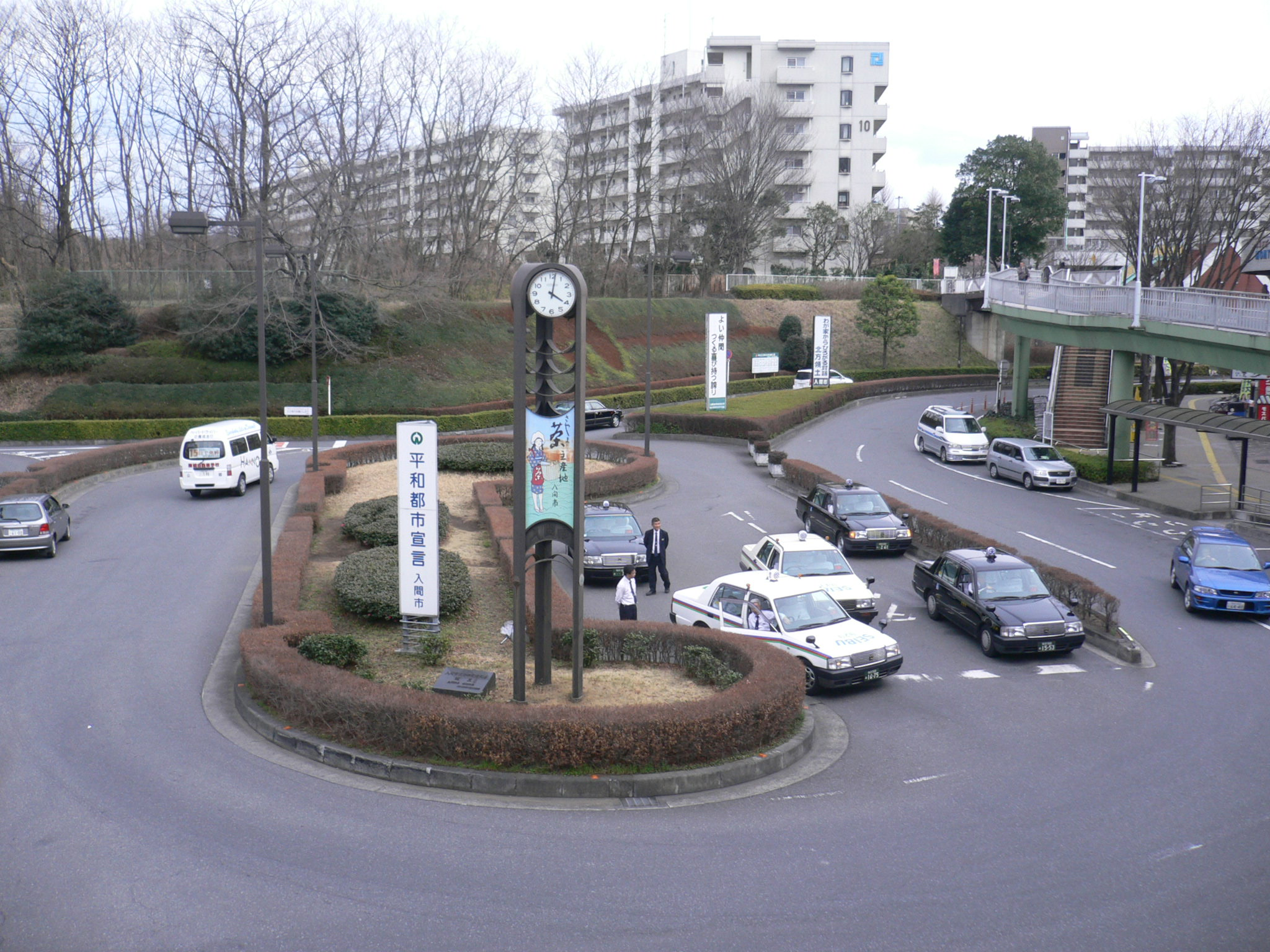
The station forecourt on the north side in March 2006

- Sayama Inariyama Park
- Iruma City Office
- Sainomori Iruma Park
- National Route 16

== See also ==
- List of railway stations in Japan
