= Act on the Prevention of Spousal Violence and the Protection of Victims =

Act on the Prevention of Spousal Violence and the Protection of Victims (Japanese: 配偶者からの暴力の防止及び被害者の保護等に関する法律, Act No. 31 of April 13, 2001) is a Japanese law that aims to prevent spousal violence and protect victims by establishing a system for reporting, consultation, protection, and self-reliance support in relation to domestic violence. It is commonly known as the Domestic Violence Prevention Law.

== History ==
On April 3, 2001, the Act was submitted to the 151st session of the Diet by the Chairman of the House of Councillors' Committee on Symbiotic Society. The Act was approved on April 6 of the same year, promulgated on April 13 of the same year, and came into effect on October 13 of the same year, with the exception of some provisions, and on April 1, 2002, the provisions on Spousal Violence Counseling and Support Center came into effect.

=== The revised law ===
The revised law, which was promulgated on June 2, 2004, and came into effect on December 2, 2004, provides for the following matters

- The definition of domestic violence has been expanded to include psychological violence. The definition of domestic violence has been expanded to include psychological violence, as well as physical violence that continues after divorce or annulment
- Prohibiting the perpetrator from roaming around the vicinity of the residence where the victim and the perpetrator live together has been added to the scope of the eviction order.
- A system for restraining orders and re-petitions against children was added

The revised law, which was promulgated on July 11, 2007, and came into effect on January 11, 2008, provides for the following matters.

- Victims of threats of harm to life or limb are added to the scope of petition for protection orders
- Adds a system to order the perpetrator not to follow the victim for six months from the day protection orders takes effect
- Adds a new system to prohibit the perpetrator from following the victim's relatives around at their addresses, etc., or vandalizing the vicinity of where the relatives are usually located

The revised law, which was promulgated on July 3, 2013, and came into effect on January 3, 2014, provides for the following matters

- Added that the law shall apply mutatis mutandis to violence by a person who is in a relationship with a person with whom he or she shares a common living space (excluding those who do not live a common life similar to a common life in marriage).
