= Elin McCready =

American linguist

- Born: 1973 or 1974 (age 52–53)

Academic background
- Education: University of Texas at Austin
- Doctoral advisor: Nicholas Asher

Academic work
- Discipline: Linguistics
- Sub-discipline: Semantics, Pragmatics
- Website: Personal website

Elin McCready is an American linguist and professor in the Department of English Language and Literature at Aoyama Gakuin University. She researches semantics, pragmatics, and philosophy of language, focusing in particular on such phenomena as evidentials, honorifics, and slurs. She is also co-director of Aoyama Gakuin University's Singularity Research Institute.

== Academic career ==
McCready earned a PhD at the University of Texas-Austin in 2005, with a dissertation entitled "The dynamics of particles".

McCready has written widely cited articles published in prestigious journals including Natural Language and Linguistic Theory, Linguistic Inquiry, Linguistics and Philosophy, Semantics and Pragmatics, and Journal of Cognitive Science. She has written two books, Reliability in Pragmatics and The Semantics and Pragmatics of Honorification: Register and Social Meaning, and has (co-)edited numerous volumes, including Formal Approaches to Semantics and Pragmatics: Japanese and Beyond.

In 2021, she received a Friedrich Wilhelm Bessel Research Award from the Alexander von Humboldt Foundation in Germany, which supports researchers who "are expected to produce cutting-edge activities".

== Gender recognition in Japan ==
McCready is a trans woman. After transitioning in the US, McCready filed to update her permanent residence card in Japan, where she lives with her wife and three children. The Japanese government refused to recognize her transition, as doing so would require them to effectively recognize same-sex marriage (which Japan currently does not) or to unilaterally annul the couple's marriage. As a result, McCready and her wife have filed suit against the Japanese government. A documentary, It's Just Our Family, has been produced about the couple's struggles with this treatment.

In 2019 McCready organised a trans inclusive club night, called WAIFU, after being refused entry to an existing women's club night.

== Selected publications ==
- McCready, Elin; Ogata, Norry (April 2007). "Evidentiality, modality and probability". Linguistics and Philosophy. 30 (2): 147–206. doi:10.1007/s10988-007-9017-7. S2CID 33976680.
- McCready, Elin (29 July 2010). "Varieties of conventional implicature". Semantics and Pragmatics. 3 (8). doi:10.3765/sp.3.8.
- McCready, Elin. 2015. Reliability in Pragmatics. Oxford. ISBN 0198702841
- McCready, Elin. 2005. The dynamics of particles. PhD dissertation, University of Texas.
- McCready, Elin. 2019. The Semantics and Pragmatics of Honorification: Register and Social Meaning. Oxford. ISBN 0198821360.
- McCready, Elin; Yabushita, Katsuhiko; Yoshimoto, Kei, eds. 2014. Formal Approaches to Semantics and Pragmatics: Japanese and Beyond. Dordrecht: Springer. ISBN 9789401788137

== See also ==
- LGBT rights in Japan
