= Iruma, Saitama =

Iruma 入間市
- City
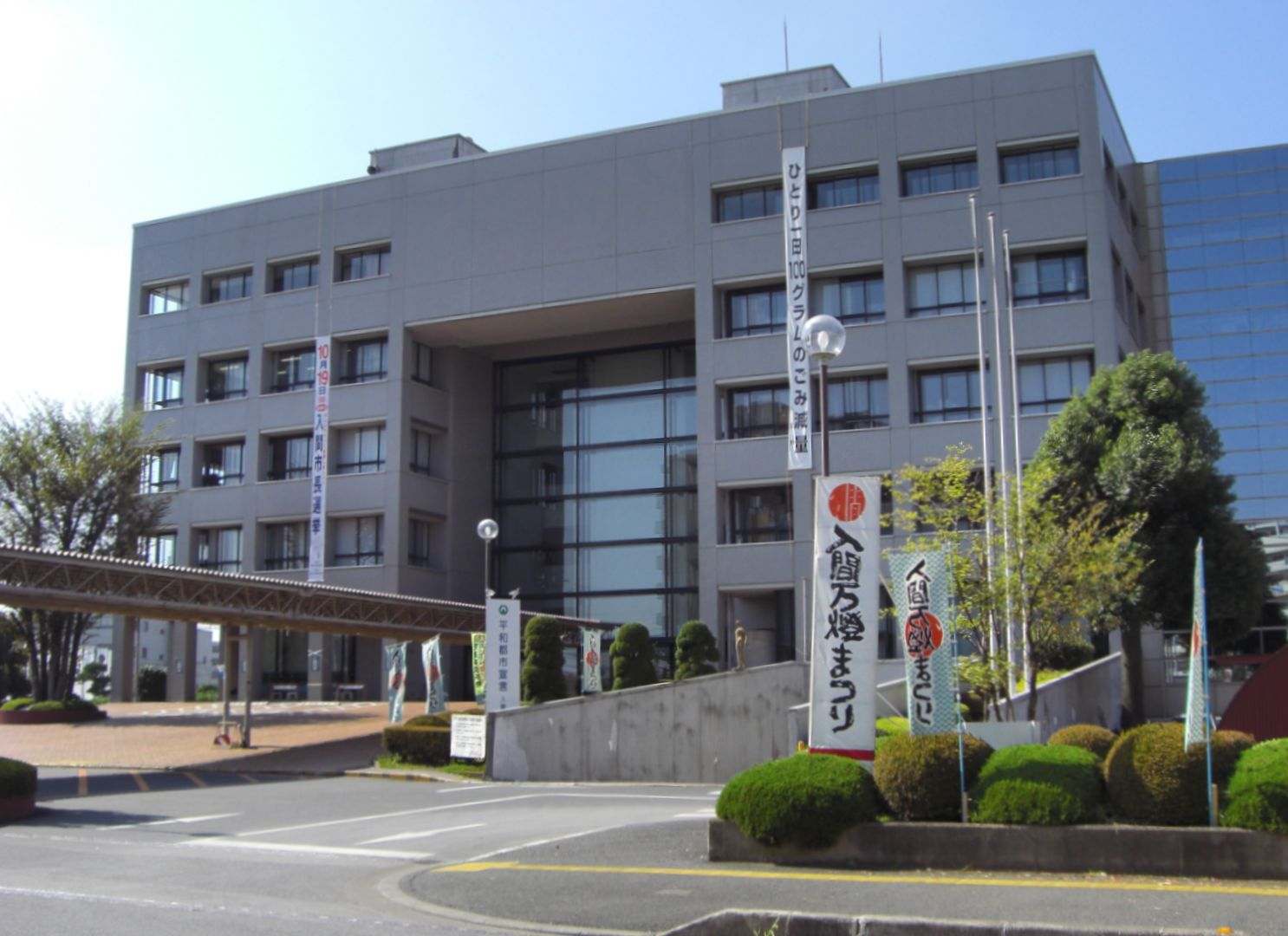
- Iruma City Hall

- Flag Seal

- Location of Iruma in Saitama Prefecture

- Location within Japan
- Coordinates: 35°50′8.9″N 139°23′28.1″E
- Country: Japan
- Region: Kantō
- Prefecture: Saitama

Government
  - Mayor: Richirō Sugiyama (from November 2020)

Area
  - Total: 44.69 km^{2} (17.25 sq mi)

Population (January 2021)
  - Total: 147,166
  - Density: 3,293/km^{2} (8,529/sq mi)
- Time zone: UTC+9 (Japan Standard Time)
- Tree: Zelkova serrata
- Flower: Camellia sinensis
- Bird: Eurasian skylark
- Phone number: 04-2964-1111
- Address: 1-16-1 Toyooka, Iruma-shi, Saitama-ken 358-8511
- Website: Official website

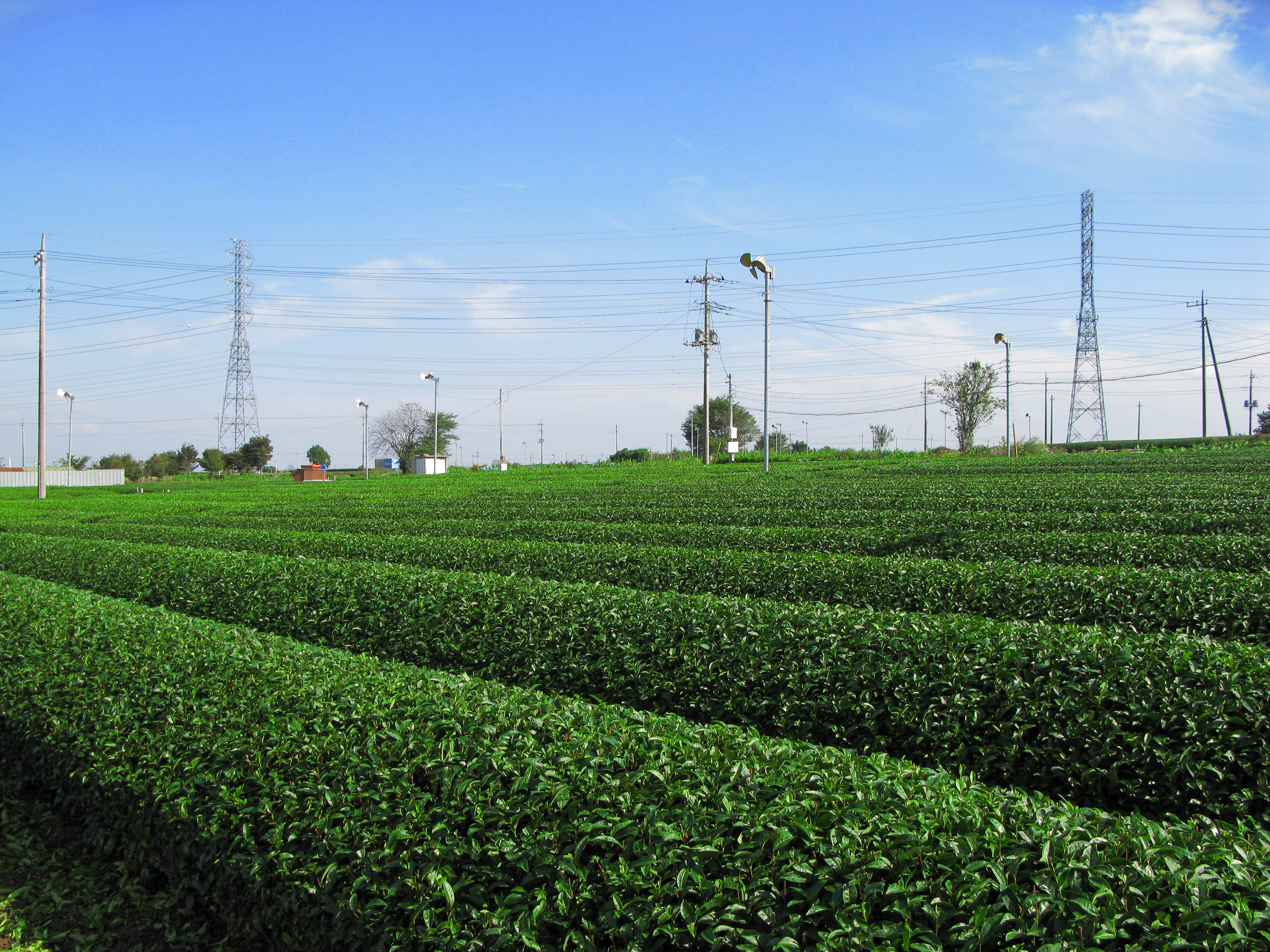
Tea fields in Iruma

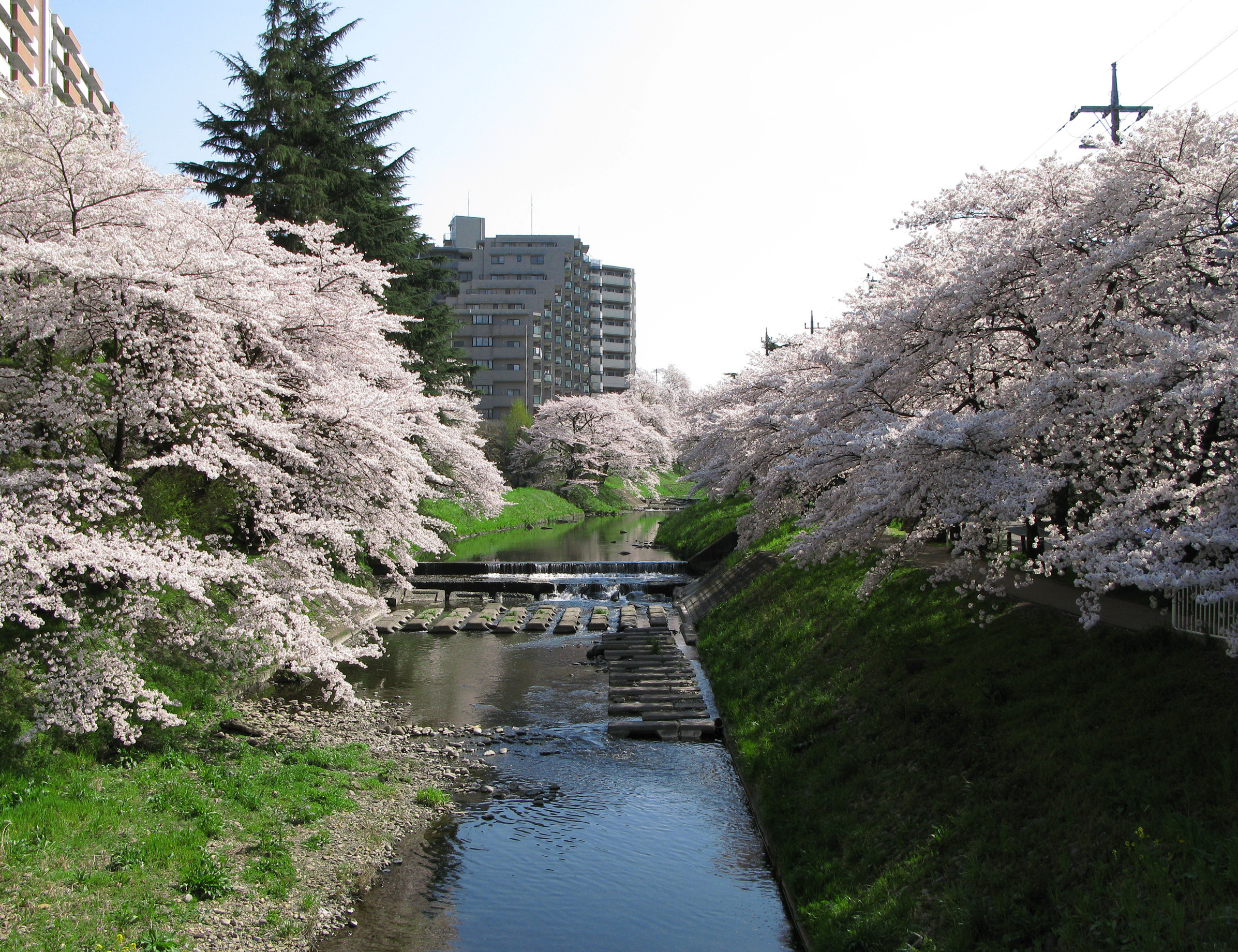
Kasumi River in Iruma

Iruma (入間市, Iruma-shi; Japanese pronunciation: [í.ɾɯ̈̀.mä̀, ì.ɾɯ̈́.mä́.ɕì]) is a city located in Saitama Prefecture, Japan. As of 1 January 2021, the city had an estimated population of 147,166 in 66,516 households and a population density of 3,300 inhabitants per square kilometre (8,500/sq mi). The total area of the city is 44.69 square kilometres (17.25 sq mi).

== Geography ==
Located in the Sayama Highlands of far southern Saitama Prefecture, Iruma is bordered by Tokyo to the south. The Iruma River flows through the city.

=== Surrounding municipalities ===
Saitama Prefecture

- Hannō
- Sayama
- Tokorozawa

Tokyo Metropolis

- Mizuho
- Ōme

=== Climate ===
Iruma has a humid subtropical climate (Köppen: Cfa) characterized by warm summers and cool winters with light to no snowfall. The average annual temperature in Iruma is 14.1 °C (57.4 °F). The average annual rainfall is 1,481 mm (58.3 in) with September as the wettest month. The temperatures are highest on average in August, at around 25.9 °C (78.6 °F), and lowest in January, at around 3.2 °C (37.8 °F).

== Demographics ==
Per Japanese census data, the population of Iruma has recently plateaued after several decades of strong growth.

Historical population
Year	Pop.	±%
1960	36,903	—
1970	65,639	+77.9%
1980	104,034	+58.5%
1990	137,585	+32.3%
2000	147,909	+7.5%
2010	149,872	+1.3%
2020	145,671	−2.8%

== History ==
The area around Iruma was part of ancient Musashi Province and was noted for kilns producing Sue ware pottery in the Nara period and Heian period. During the Edo period, the area developed as a series of three post towns on the Nikkō Wakiōkan highway during the Edo period. The town of Toyooka and villages of Kaneko, Miyadera, Fujisawa and Higashikaneko were created within Iruma District, Saitama, with the establishment of the modern municipalities system on April 1, 1889. The Imperial Japanese Army Air Academy established an airfield in the area in 1938, which later developed into Iruma Air Base. On April 1, 1954, Higashikaneko became Seibu Town. On September 30, 1956, Toyooka, Kaneko, Miyadera, Fujisawa and Seibu merged to form the town of Musashi. Musashi was elevated to city status on November 1, 1966, becoming the city of Iruma. Discussions to merge with the neighboring city of Sayama in 2005 failed to pass a referendum. In 2017 Japan became the first country to elect an openly transgender man to any public office when Tomoya Hosoda was elected as a councillor for the city of Iruma.

== Government ==
Iruma has a mayor-council form of government with a directly elected mayor and a unicameral city council of 22 members. Iruma contributes two members to the Saitama Prefectural Assembly. In terms of national politics, the city is part of Saitama 9th district of the lower house of the Diet of Japan.

== Economy ==
Iruma has a mixed economy with numerous industrial parks for light manufacturing and also serves as a regional commercial center. Due to its location, it is also a bedroom community for people commuting to the Tokyo metropolis for work. In agriculture, Iruma and neighboring Sayama are famous for the green tea they produce.

== Education ==
- Musashino Academia Musicae – Iruma campus
- Iruma 16 public elementary schools and 11 public middle schools operated by the city government, and two public high schools operated by the Saitama Prefectural Board of Education. In addition, there is one combined private middle/high school and three private high schools. The prefecture also operates one special education school.

== Transportation ==
=== Railway ===
JR East – Hachikō Line

- Kaneko

Seibu Railway - Seibu Ikebukuro Line

- Musashi-Fujisawa – Irumashi – Bushi – Motokaji

=== Highway ===
- Ken-Ō Expressway
- National Route 16
- National Route 299
- National Route 463
- National Route 407
- National Route 468

== Military facilities ==
- Iruma Air Base, located in Iruma and neighboring the city of Sayama, is a facility of the Japan Air Self-Defense Force. The base holds an open house annually in early November. This airbase was formerly known as Johnson Air Base while under the control of the United States Air Force.

== Sister cities ==
Iruma is twinned with:

- Sado, Niigata, Japan, since 1986
- Wolfratshausen, Germany, since October 14, 1987
- Fenghua, Zhejiang, China, friendship city since May 16, 2000

== Local attractions ==
- Iruma City Museum

== Notable people ==
- Chihana Hara, rhythmic gymnast
- Keisuke Ishii, professional wrestler
- Wataru Kozuki, Takarazuka performer
- Yūsei Matsui, manga artist
- Junpei Yasuda, journalist
