= Ayako Fuchigami =

Japanese politician (born 1975)

- 渕上 綾子
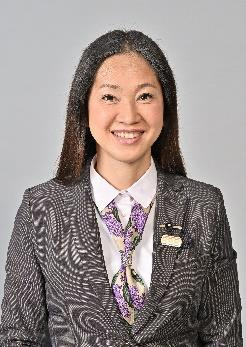
- Ayako in 2023

Member of the Hokkaido Legislative Assembly
- Incumbent
- Assumed office 30 April 2019
- Constituency: Higashi-ku, Sapporo

Personal details
- Born: 16 January 1975 (age 51) Ogi, Saga, Japan
- Party: Constitutional Democratic
- Education: University of Toyama; Hokkaido University
- Website: http://fuchigamiayako.jp/

Ayako Fuchigami (Japanese: 渕上 綾子, Hepburn: Fuchigami Ayako; born 16 January 1975) is Japanese politician serving as a member of the Hokkaido Legislative Assembly, representing Sapporo's Higashi-ku ward. She is the first openly transgender person to hold a prefectural assembly position in Japan.

== Life ==
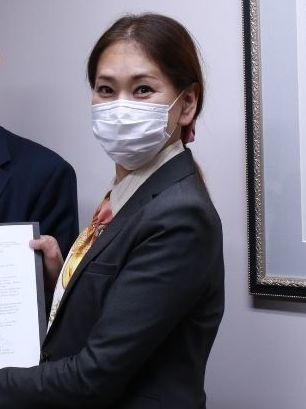
Fuchigami in 2021.

Fuchigami was born in Ogi, Saga Prefecture, on 16 January 1975. In March 1993, she graduated from the Ogi Prefectural High School.

Fuchigami became a show dancer in 2001, and later, in 2006, she legally changed her name.

She was endorsed by the Constitutional Democratic Party of Japan during the 2019 Hokkaido prefectural election, and won a seat, taking office officially on April 30.

On January 18, 2020, she was invited to speak in Saga city, by the teachers union.

During the 2023 Hokkaido prefectural election, she won with 24,986 votes, and is the incumbent representative of Higashi-ku, Sapporo. This is more than in 2019 when she gained 18,372 votes.

== See also ==
- List of transgender people
- Aya Kamikawa
