= Tomoya Hosoda =

Japanese politician

- 細田 智也

Member of the Iruma City Council
- Incumbent
- Assumed office 17 March 2025
- In office 30 March 2017 – 29 March 2023

Personal details
- Born: 14 November 1991 (age 34) Hannō, Saitama, Japan
- Party: Independent
- Education: Teikyo University

Tomoya Hosoda (細田 智也, Hosoda Tomoya; born 14 November 1991) is a Japanese politician who, on 17 March 2017, became the first transgender man politician to be elected to office when he was elected to the city council of Iruma, Saitama. He was re-elected on 17 March 2025.

He underwent gender confirmation surgery in 2015 at the age of 23. (Note: The year of his surgery differs among the sources. While the New York Times reports that he underwent the surgery in 2014, the article published by his party says it was in 2015.) After graduating from Teikyo University, he had worked as medical technologist at a hospital in Shizuoka before he was elected.
