= Shōmaru Station =

Railway station in Hannō, Saitama Prefecture, Japan

SI33 Shōmaru Station 正丸駅
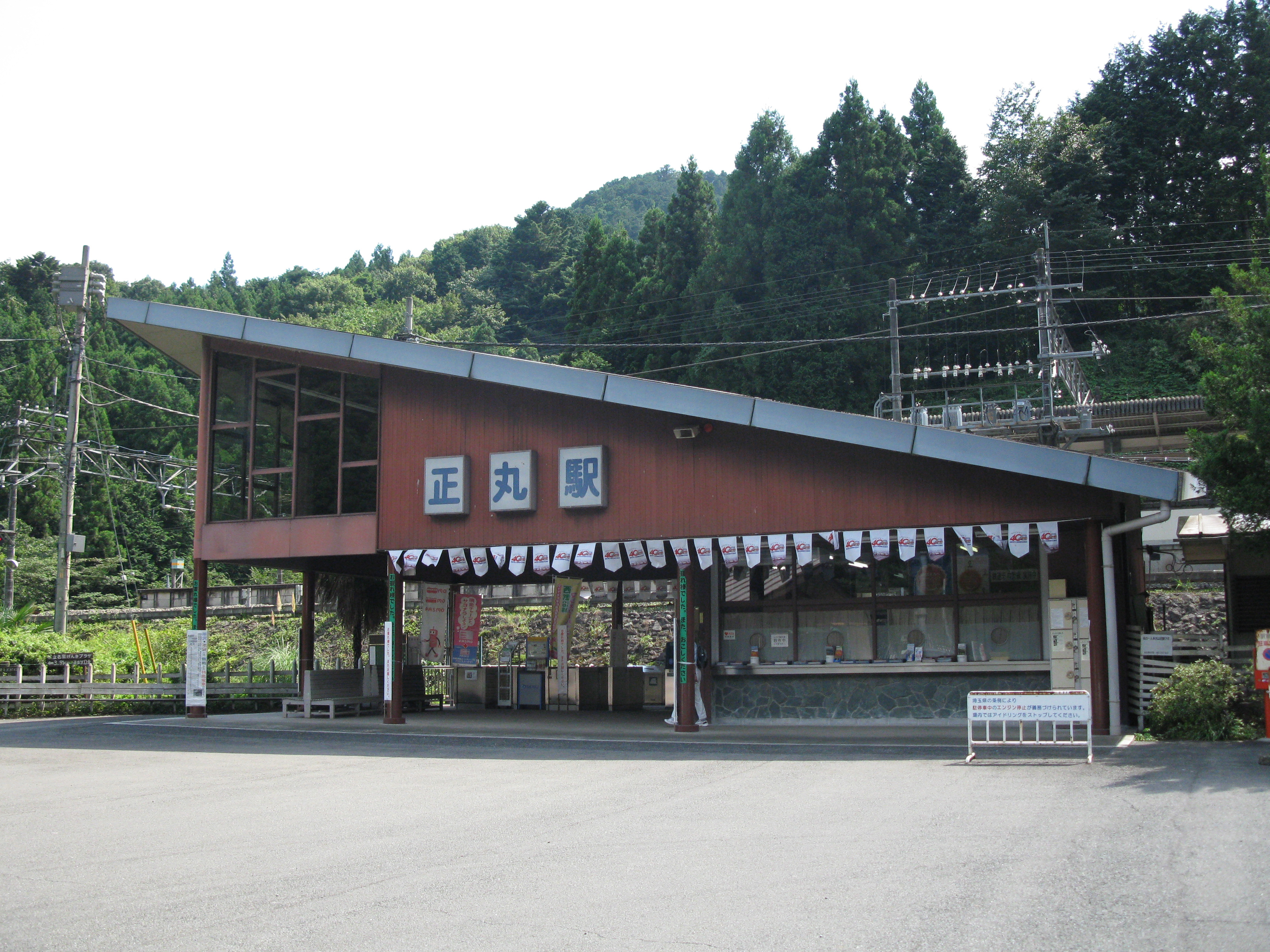
- Shōmaru station building, August 2009

General information
- Location: 1658 Sakamoto, Hannō-shi, Saitama-ken 357-0218; Japan
- Coordinates: 35.9385°N 139.1816°E
- Operator: Seibu Railway
- Line: Seibu Chichibu Line
- Distance: 64.1 km from Ikebukuro
- Platforms: 1 island platform

Other information
- Station code: SI33

History
- Opened: 14 October 1969

Passengers
- FY2019: 194 (Daily)

Services
Preceding station	Seibu Railway	Following station
Ashigakubo SI34 towards Seibu-Chichibu	Seibu Chichibu Line	Nishi-Agano SI32 towards Agano
Location
- Location within Saitama Prefecture Location within Japan

Shōmaru Station (正丸駅, Shōmaru-eki) is a passenger railway station located in the city of Hannō, Saitama, Japan, operated by the private railway operator Seibu Railway. In terms of daily passenger usage, it is the least used station operated by Seibu Railway.

== Lines ==
Shōmaru Station is served by the Seibu Chichibu Line to Seibu-Chichibu and is 6.3 kilometers from the official starting point of the line at Agano.

== Station layout ==
The station consists of one island platform serving two tracks, connected to the station building by an underground passage.

=== Platforms ===
1	Seibu Ikebukuro Line	for Hannō; Seibu Ikebukuro Line for Ikebukuro
2	Seibu Chichibu Line	for Yokoze and Seibu-Chichibu

== History ==
The station opened on 14 October 1969.

Station numbering was introduced on all Seibu Railway lines during fiscal 2012, with Shōmaru Station becoming "SI33".

== Passenger statistics ==
In fiscal 2019, Shōmaru Station was the 92nd busiest station on the Seibu network with an average of 194 passengers daily, making it the least used station on the network.

The passenger figures for previous years are as shown below.

Fiscal year	Daily average
2009	319
2010	304
2011	292
2012	287
2013	287

== Surrounding area ==
- National Route 299

== See also ==
- List of railway stations in Japan
