= Nishi-Agano Station =

Railway station in Hannō, Saitama Prefecture, Japan

SI32 Nishi-Agano Station 西吾野駅
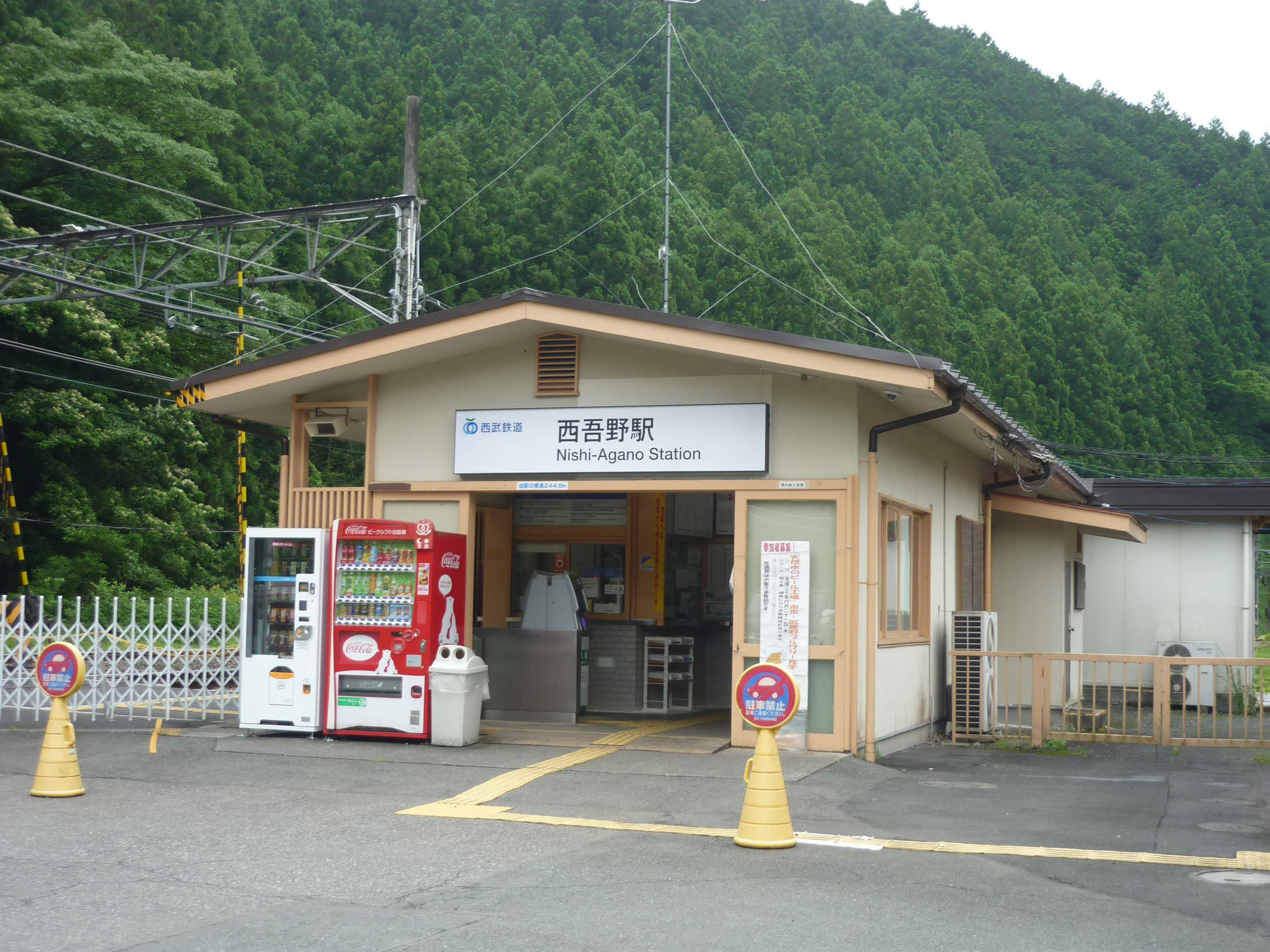
- Nishi-Agano station building, June 2017

General information
- Location: Agano, Hannō-shi, Saitama-ken 357-0216; Japan
- Coordinates: 35.9263°N 139.2023°E
- Operator: Seibu Railway
- Line: Seibu Chichibu Line
- Distance: 61.4 km from Ikebukuro
- Platforms: 1 island platform

Other information
- Station code: SI32

History
- Opened: 14 October 1969

Passengers
- FY2019: 343 (Daily)

Services
| Preceding station | Seibu Railway | Following station |
|---|---|---|
| Shōmaru SI33 towards Seibu-Chichibu | Seibu Chichibu Line | Agano SI31 Terminus |
Location
- Location within Saitama Prefecture Location within Japan

Nishi-Agano Station (西吾野駅, Nishi-Agano-eki) is a passenger railway station located in the city of Hannō, Saitama, Japan, operated by the private railway operator Seibu Railway.

== Lines ==
Nishi-Agano Station is served by the Seibu Chichibu Line to Seibu-Chichibu and is 3.6 kilometers from the official starting point of the line at Agano.

== Station layout ==
The station consists of one island platform serving two tracks, connected to the station building by a level crossing.

=== Platforms ===
| 1 | Seibu Chichibu Line | for Yokoze and Seibu-Chichibu |
| 2 | Seibu Ikebukuro Line | for Hannō; Seibu Ikebukuro Line for Ikebukuro |

== History ==
The station opened on 14 October 1969.

Station numbering was introduced on all Seibu Railway lines during fiscal 2012, with Nishi-Agano Station becoming "SI32".

== Passenger statistics ==
In fiscal 2019, the station was used by an average of 343 passengers daily, making it the 89th of the Seibu network's ninety-two stations

The passenger figures for previous years are as shown below.

| Fiscal year | Daily average |
|---|---|
| 2009 | 489 |
| 2010 | 421 |
| 2011 | 398 |
| 2012 | 409 |
| 2013 | 374 |

== Surrounding area ==
- National Route 299
- Hanno Municipal Office Agino Contact Information Office
