= Ashigakubo Station =

Railway station in Yokoze, Saitama Prefecture, Japan

SI34 Ashigakubo Station 芦ヶ久保駅
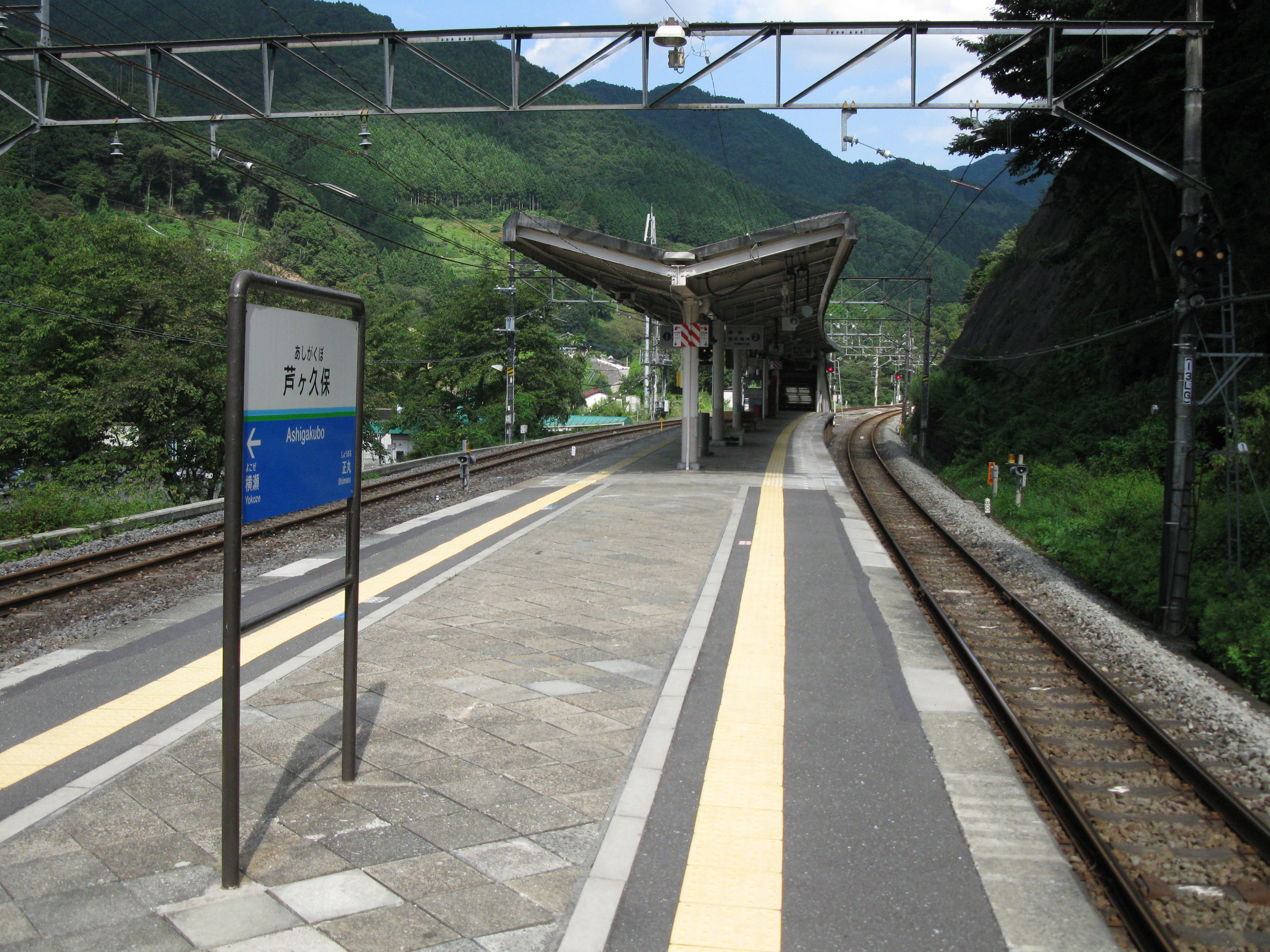
- The platforms in August 2009

General information
- Location: 1925 Ashigakubo, Yokoze-machi, Chichibu-gun, Saitama-ken 368-0071; Japan
- Coordinates: 35.9767°N 139.1362°E
- Operator: Seibu Railway
- Line: Seibu Chichibu Line
- Distance: 12.4 km from Agano
- Platforms: 1 island platform
- Tracks: 2

Other information
- Station code: SI34

History
- Opened: 14 October 1969

Passengers
- FY2019: 340 (Daily)

Services
| Preceding station | Seibu Railway | Following station |
|---|---|---|
| Yokoze SI35 towards Seibu-Chichibu | Seibu Chichibu Line | Shōmaru SI33 towards Agano |
Location
- Location within Saitama Prefecture Location within Japan

Ashigakubo Station (芦ヶ久保駅, Ashigakubo-eki) is a passenger railway station located in the town of Yokoze, Saitama, Japan, operated by the private railway operator Seibu Railway.

== Lines ==
Ashigakubo Station is served by the Seibu Chichibu Line to Seibu-Chichibu and is 12.4 kilometers from the official starting point of the line at Agano.

== Station layout ==
The station consists of one island platform serving two tracks, connected to the station building by an underground passage.

=== Platforms ===
| 1 | Seibu Chichibu Line | for Hannō; Seibu Ikebukuro Line for Tokorozawa and Ikebukuro |
| 2 | Seibu Chichibu Line | for Yokoze and Seibu-Chichibu |

== History ==
The station opened on 14 October 1969.

Station numbering was introduced on all Seibu Railway lines during fiscal 2012, with Ashigakubo Station becoming "SI34".

== Passenger statistics ==
In fiscal 2019, the station was the 90th busiest on the Seibu network with an average of 340 passengers daily. The passenger figures for previous years are as shown below.

| Fiscal year | Daily average |
|---|---|
| 2000 | 572 |
| 2005 | 430 |
| 2010 | 326 |
| 2015 | 390 |

== Surrounding area ==
- National Route 299
- Ashikagakubo Post Office
- Yokose River

== See also ==
- List of railway stations in Japan
