= Musashi-Yokote Station =

Railway station in Hidaka, Saitama Prefecture, Japan

SI29 Musashi-Yokote Station 武蔵横手駅
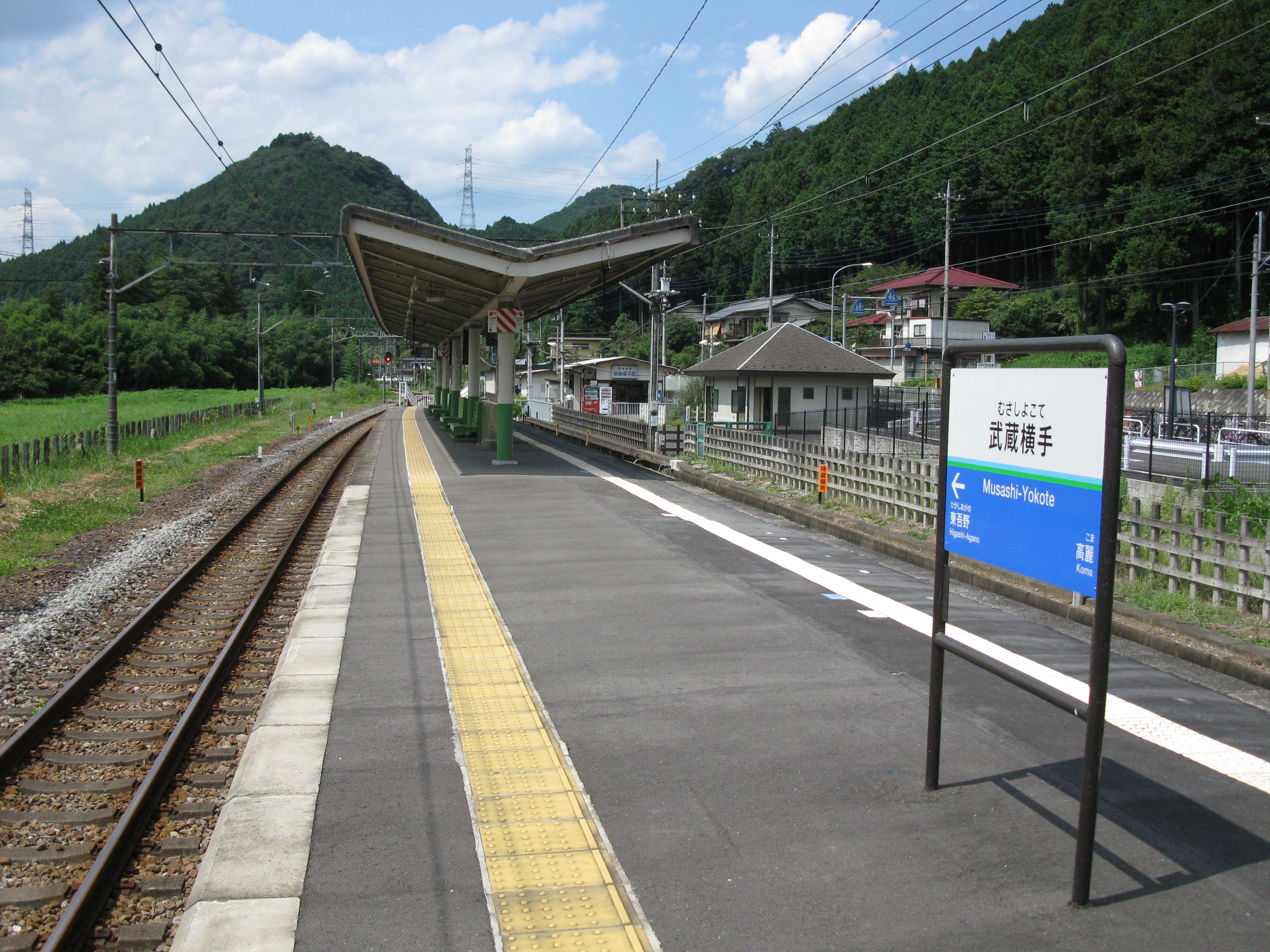
- Musashi-Yokote platform

General information
- Location: 750 Yokote Yamashita, Hidaka-shi, Saitama-ken 350-1257; Japan
- Coordinates: 35.8855°N 139.2808°E
- Operator: Seibu Railway
- Line: Seibu Ikebukuro Line
- Distance: 51.3 km from Ikebukuro
- Platforms: 1 island platform

Other information
- Station code: SI29

History
- Opened: 10 September 1929

Passengers
- FY2019: 295 (Daily)

Services
Preceding station	Seibu Railway	Following station
Higashi-Agano SI30 towards Agano	Ikebukuro Line Local	Koma SI28 towards Ikebukuro
Location
- Location within Saitama Prefecture Location within Japan

Musashi-Yokote Station (武蔵横手駅, Musashi-Yokote-eki) is a passenger railway station located in the city of Hidaka, Saitama, Japan, operated by the private railway operator Seibu Railway.

== Lines ==
Musashi-Yokote Station is served by the Seibu Chichibu Line and is 51.3 kilometers from the official starting point of the line at Ikebukuro.

== Station layout ==
The station consists of one island platform serving two tracks, connected to the station building by a level crossing.

=== Platforms ===
1	Seibu Ikebukuro Line	for Hannō, Tokorozawa, and Ikebukuro
2	Seibu Ikebukuro Line	for Agano and Seibu-Chichibu

== History ==
The station opened on 10 September 1929.

Station numbering was introduced on all Seibu Railway lines during fiscal 2012, with Musashi-Yokote Station becoming "SI29".

== Passenger statistics ==
In fiscal 2019, the station was used by an average of 295 passengers daily, making it the 91st of the Seibu network's ninety-two stations

The passenger figures for previous years are as shown below.

Fiscal year	Daily average
2009	381
2010	350
2011	463
2012	392
2013	315

== Surrounding area ==
- National Route 299
