= Koma Station (Saitama) =

Railway station in Hidaka, Saitama Prefecture, Japan

SI28 Koma Station 高麗駅
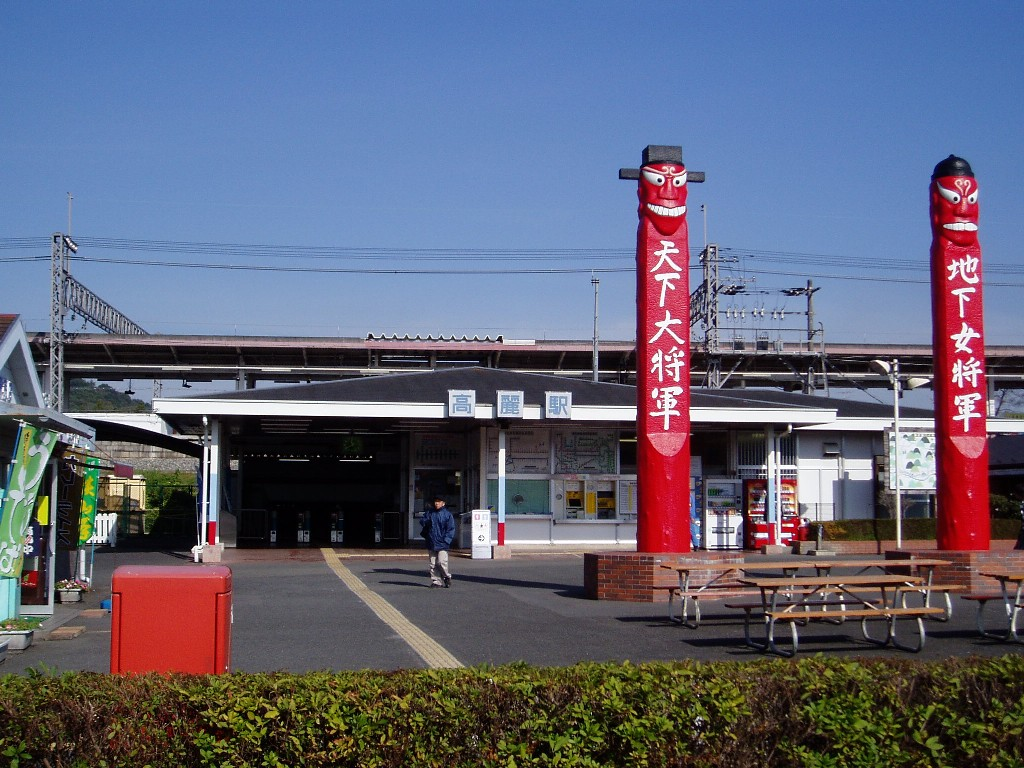
- Koma Station in November 2006

General information
- Location: 10101 Musashidai, Hidaka-shi, Saitama-ken 350-1255; Japan
- Coordinates: 35.8819°N 139.3043°E
- Operator: Seibu Railway
- Line: Seibu Ikebukuro Line
- Distance: 48.5 km from Ikebukuro
- Platforms: 1 island platform
- Tracks: 3

Other information
- Station code: SI28

History
- Opened: 10 September 1929

Passengers
- FY2019: 2597 (Daily)

Services
Preceding station	Seibu Railway	Following station
Musashi-Yokote SI29 towards Agano	Ikebukuro Line Local	Higashi-Hannō SI27 towards Ikebukuro
Location
- Location within Saitama Prefecture Location within Japan

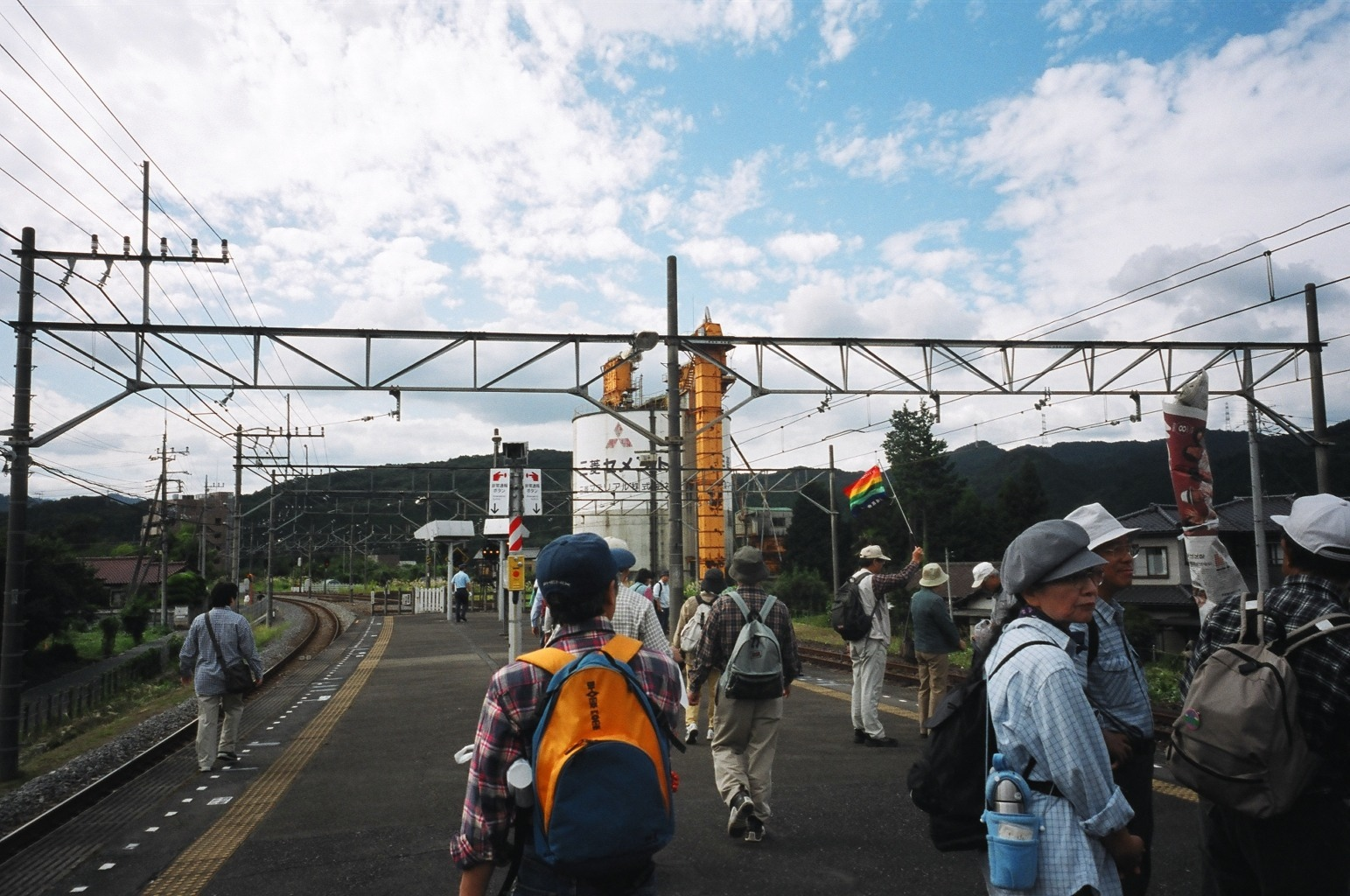
Platforms, 2003

Koma Station (高麗駅, Koma-eki) is a passenger railway station located in the city of Hidaka, Saitama, Japan, operated by the private railway operator Seibu Railway.

== Lines ==
Koma Station is served by the Seibu Chichibu Line and is 48.5 kilometers from the official starting point of the line at Ikebukuro.

== Station layout ==
The station consists of one island platform serving two tracks. The platform is built on an embankment, and is connected to the station building by an underground passage. There is a third track for trains to bypass the station.

=== Platforms ===
1	Seibu Ikebukuro Line	for Agano and Seibu-Chichibu
2	Seibu Ikebukuro Line	for Hannō, Tokorozawa, and Ikebukuro

== History ==
The station opened on 10 September 1929.

Station numbering was introduced on all Seibu Railway lines during fiscal 2012, with Koma Station becoming "SI28".

== Passenger statistics ==
In fiscal 2019, the station was used by an average of 2597 passengers daily, making it the 83rd of the Seibu network's ninety-two stations

The passenger figures for previous years are as shown below.

Fiscal year	Daily average
2009	3,994
2010	3,405
2011	3,221
2012	3,111
2013	2,978

== Surrounding area ==
- National Route 299
- Koma-Musashi New Town

== See also ==
- List of railway stations in Japan
