= Higashi-Hannō Station =

Railway station in Hannō, Saitama Prefecture, Japan

SI27 Higashi-Hannō Station 東飯能駅
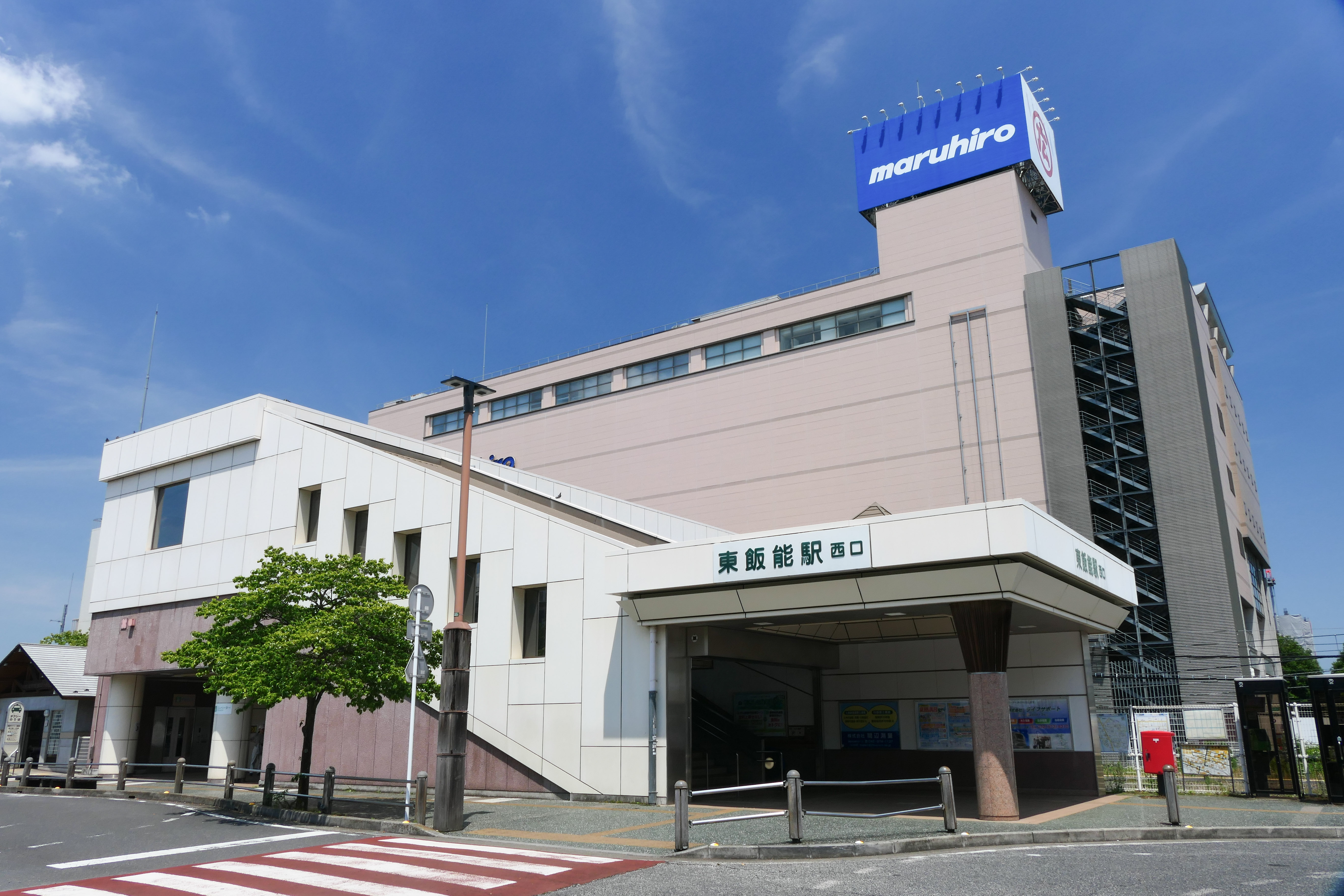
- Higashi-Hannō Station west entrance, June 2024

General information
- Location: 1-5 Azuma-chō, Hannō-shi, Saitama-ken 357-0034; Japan
- Coordinates: 35°51′10″N 139°19′33″E
- Operator: JR East; Seibu Railway
- Lines: ■ Hachikō Line; Seibu Ikebukuro Line
- Distance: 44.5 km from Ikebukuro
- Platforms: 1 side +1 island platform

Other information
- Status: Staffed
- Station code: SI27

History
- Opened: December 10, 1931

Passengers
- FY2019: 5,751 (JR East, boarding only), 5,651 (Seibu) daily

Services
Preceding station	JR East	Following station
Komagawa Terminus	Hachikō Line	Kaneko towards Hachiōji
Preceding station	Seibu Railway	Following station
Koma SI28 towards Agano	Ikebukuro Line Local	Hannō SI26 towards Ikebukuro
Location
- Location within Saitama Prefecture Location within Japan

Higashi-Hannō Station (東飯能駅, Higashi-Hannō-eki) is a passenger railway station located in the city of Hannō, Saitama, Japan, jointly operated by East Japan Railway Company (JR East) and the private railway operator Seibu Railway.

== Lines ==
Higashi-Hannō Station is served by the JR East Hachikō Line from Hachiōji with many services running to and from Kawagoe on the Kawagoe Line. It is 25.6 kilometers from the official starting point of the line at Hachiōji. It is also served by the Seibu Ikebukuro Line from Ikebukuro in Tokyo and is 44.5 kilometers from the starting point of the line at Ikebukuro.

== Station layout ==
=== JR Higashi-Hanno Station ===
The JR East station consists of one ground-level island platform serving three tracks, one of which is used exclusively for freight operations. The platform is connected by a footbridge to the neighboring station building. The station is staffed.

=== Seibu Higashi-Hanno Station ===
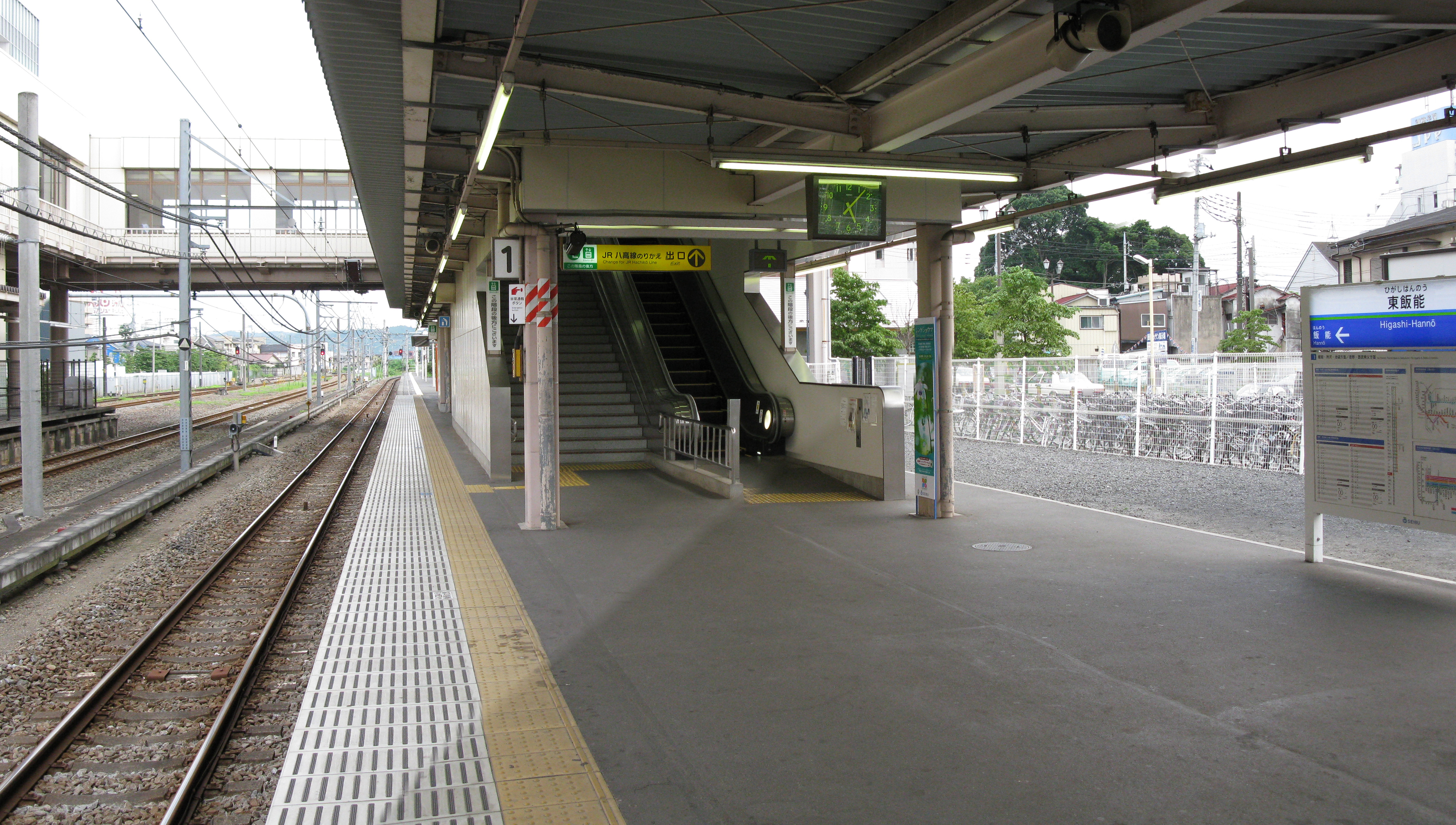
View of the Seibu platform, August 2009

The Seibu station consists of one ground-level side platform, serving a single bidirectional track, connected to the JR platform and the station building by a footbridge.

=== Platforms ===
1	Seibu Ikebukuro Line	for Hannō, Tokorozawa, and Ikebukuro
1	Seibu Ikebukuro Line	for Agano and Seibu-Chichibu
2	■ Hachikō Line	for Komagawa and Kawagoe
3	■ Hachikō Line	for Haijima and Hachiōji

== History ==
The station opened on December 10, 1931, as a joint station of Japanese Government Railways and the Musashino Railway (present-day Seibu).

Station numbering was introduced on all Seibu Railway lines during fiscal 2012, with Higashi-Hannō Station becoming "SI27".

== Passenger statistics ==
In fiscal 2019, the Seibu station was the 79th busiest on the Seibu network with an average of 5,651 passengers daily.

In fiscal 2019, the JR station was used by an average of 5751 passengers daily (boarding passengers only).

The passenger figures for previous years are as shown below. Note that the figures for JR East consider only boarding passengers whereas those for Seibu consider both boarding and disembarking passengers.

Fiscal year	Daily average	
Fiscal year	JR East	Seibu
2005	5944	2622
2010	5599	2639
2015	5694	2715

== Surrounding area ==
- Hannō Post Office
- Hannō City Hall
- National Route 299
