= Higashi-Agano Station =

Railway station in Hannō, Saitama Prefecture, Japan

SI30 Higashi-Agano Station 東吾野駅
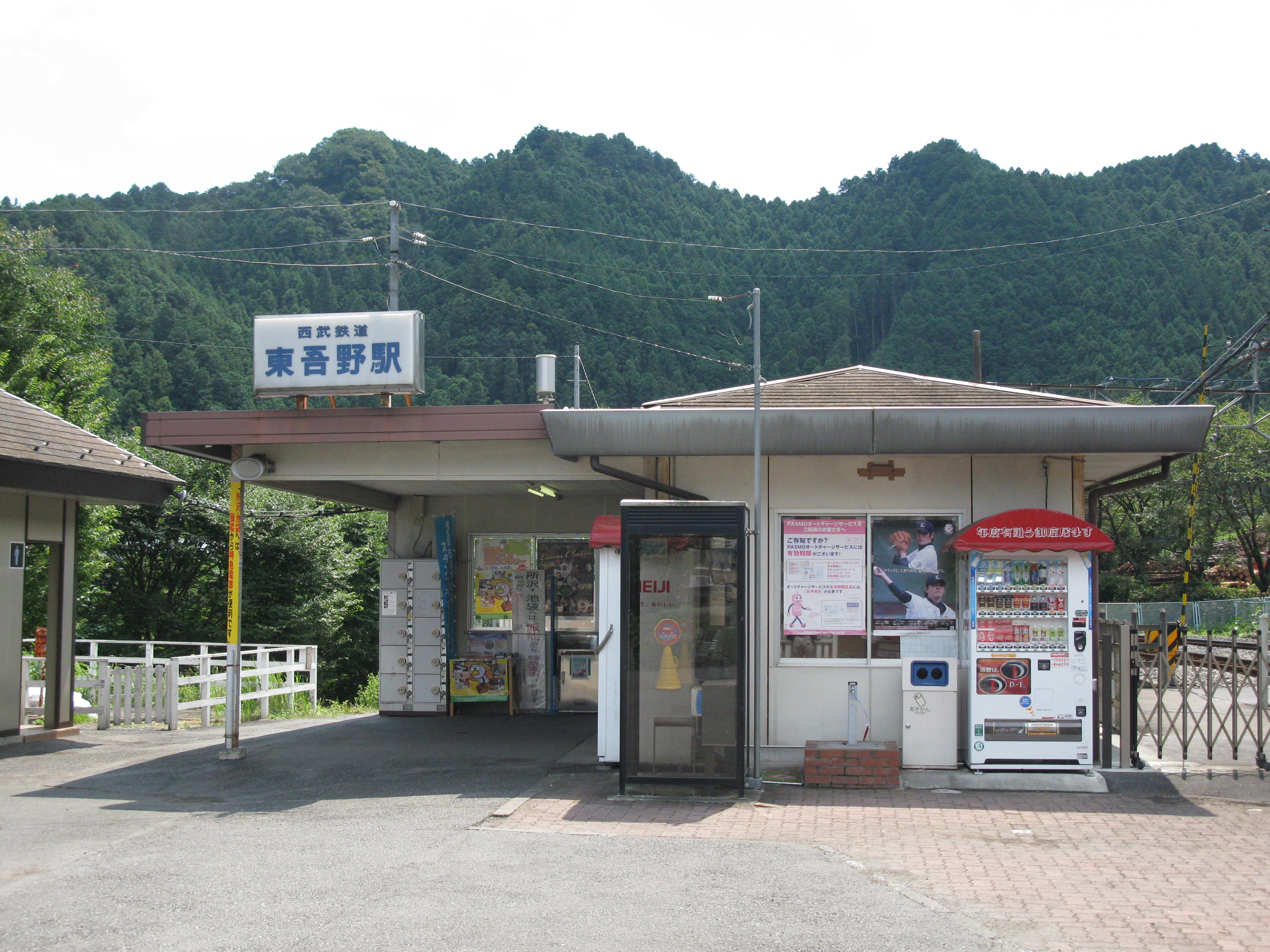
- Higashi-Agano Station building in 2009

General information
- Location: 229 Hirado, Hannō-shi, Saitama-ken 357-0211; Japan
- Coordinates: 35.8925°N 139.2604°E
- Operator: Seibu Railway
- Line: Seibu Ikebukuro Line
- Distance: 53.8 km from Ikebukuro
- Platforms: 1 island platform

Other information
- Station code: SI30

History
- Opened: 10 September 1929
- Former names: Koshū (to 1933)

Passengers
- FY2019: 456 (Daily)

Services
Preceding station	Seibu Railway	Following station
Agano SI31 Terminus	Ikebukuro Line Local	Musashi-Yokote SI29 towards Ikebukuro
Location
- Location within Saitama Prefecture Location within Japan

Higashi-Agano Station (東吾野駅, Higashi-Agano-eki) is a passenger railway station located in the city of Hannō, Saitama, Japan, operated by the private railway operator Seibu Railway.

== Lines ==
Higashi-Agano Station is served by the Seibu Ikebukuro Line and is 53.8 kilometers from the official starting point of the line at Ikebukuro.

== Station layout ==
The station consists of one island platform serving two tracks, connected to the station building by a level crossing.

=== Platforms ===
1	Seibu Ikebukuro Line	for Hannō, Tokorozawa, and Ikebukuro
2	Seibu Ikebukuro Line	for Agano and Seibu-Chichibu

== History ==
The station opened on 10 September 1929 as Koshū Station (虎秀駅). It was renamed to its present name on 1 March 1933.

Station numbering was introduced on all Seibu Railway lines during fiscal 2012, with Higashi-Agano Station becoming "SI30".

== Passenger statistics ==
In fiscal 2019, the station was the 88th busiest on the Seibu network with an average of 456 passengers daily.

The passenger figures for previous years are as shown below.

Fiscal year	Daily average
2009	662
2010	588
2011	664
2012	588
2013	532

== Surrounding area ==
- National Route 299
- Higashi-Agano Post Office

== See also ==
- List of railway stations in Japan
