= Hannō =

Hannō 飯能市
- City
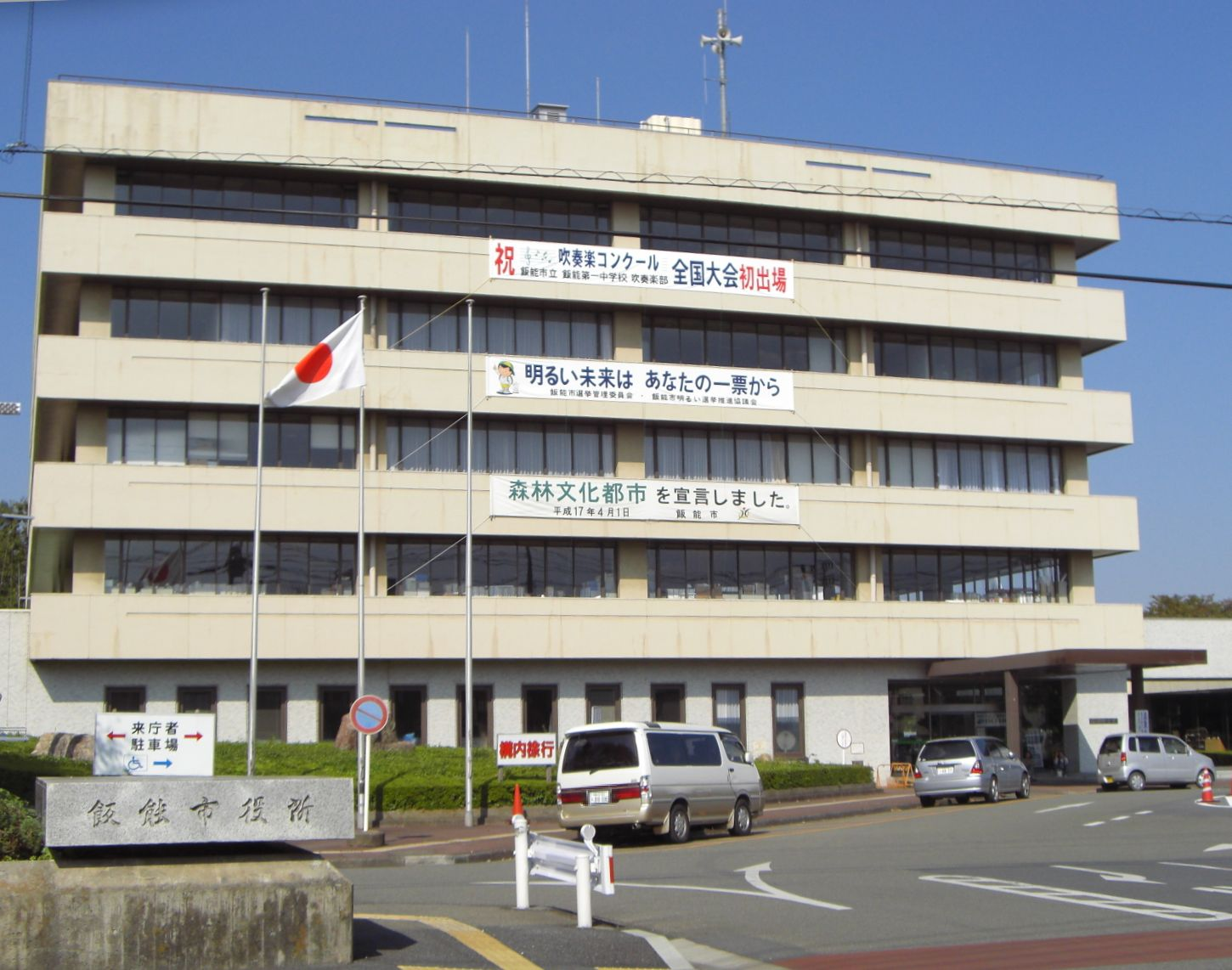
- Hannō City Hall

- Flag Seal

- Location of Hannō in Saitama Prefecture

- Coordinates: 35°51′20.4″N 139°19′39.8″E
- Country: Japan
- Region: Kantō
- Prefecture: Saitama
- First official recorded: 27 AD (official)
- Town settled: April 1, 1889
- City settled: January 1, 1954

Government
  - Mayor: Shigeharu Arai (since August 2021)

Area
  - Total: 193.05 km^{2} (74.54 sq mi)

Population (January 2021)
  - Total: 79,123
  - Density: 409.86/km^{2} (1,061.5/sq mi)
- Time zone: UTC+9 (Japan Standard Time)
- Tree: Cryptomeria japonica
- Flower: Rhododendron
- Bird: Cettia diphone
- Address: 1-1 Namiyanagi, Hannō-shi, Saitama-ken 357-8501
- Website: Official website

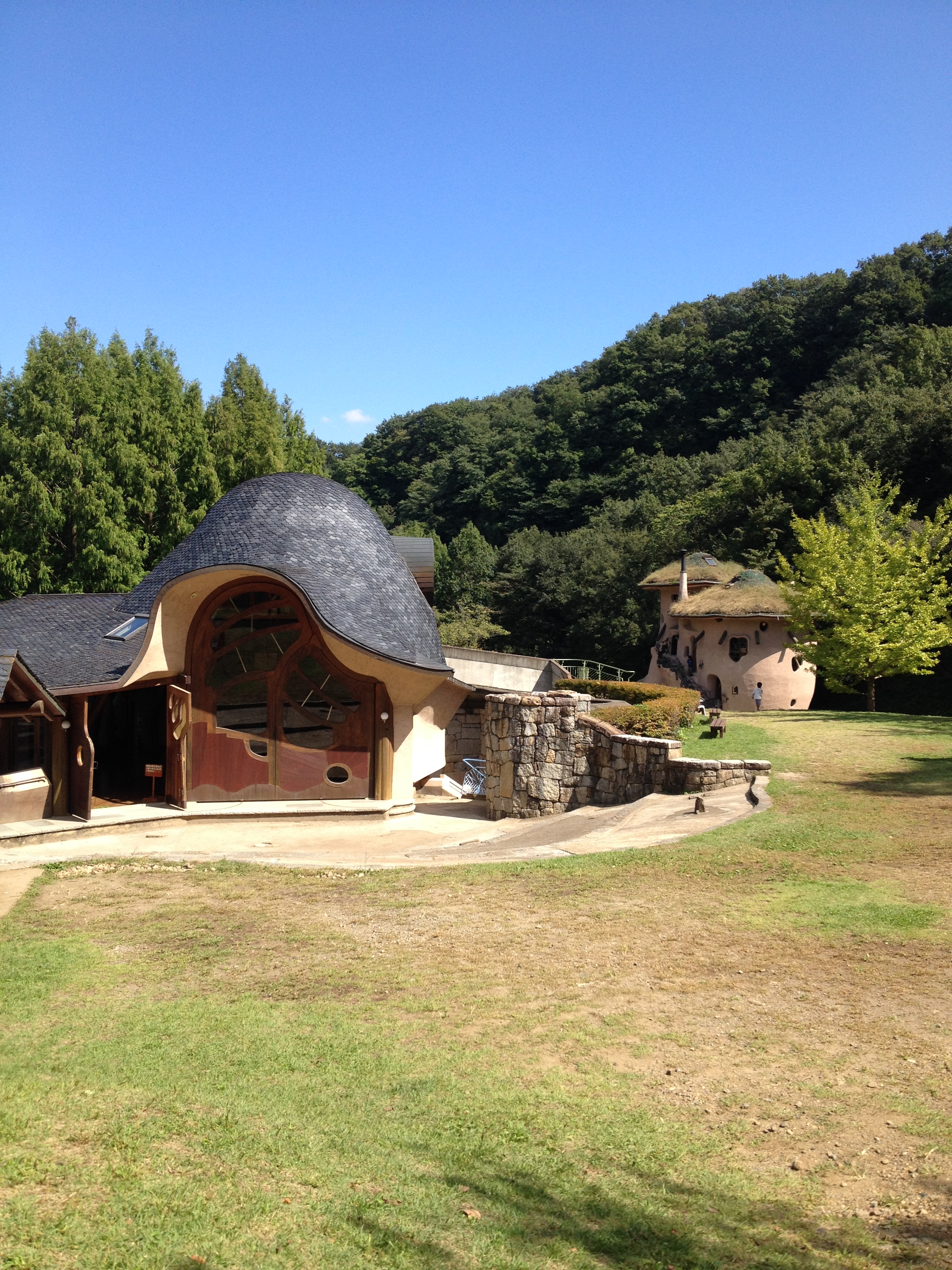
Akebono Kodomo-no-mori Park

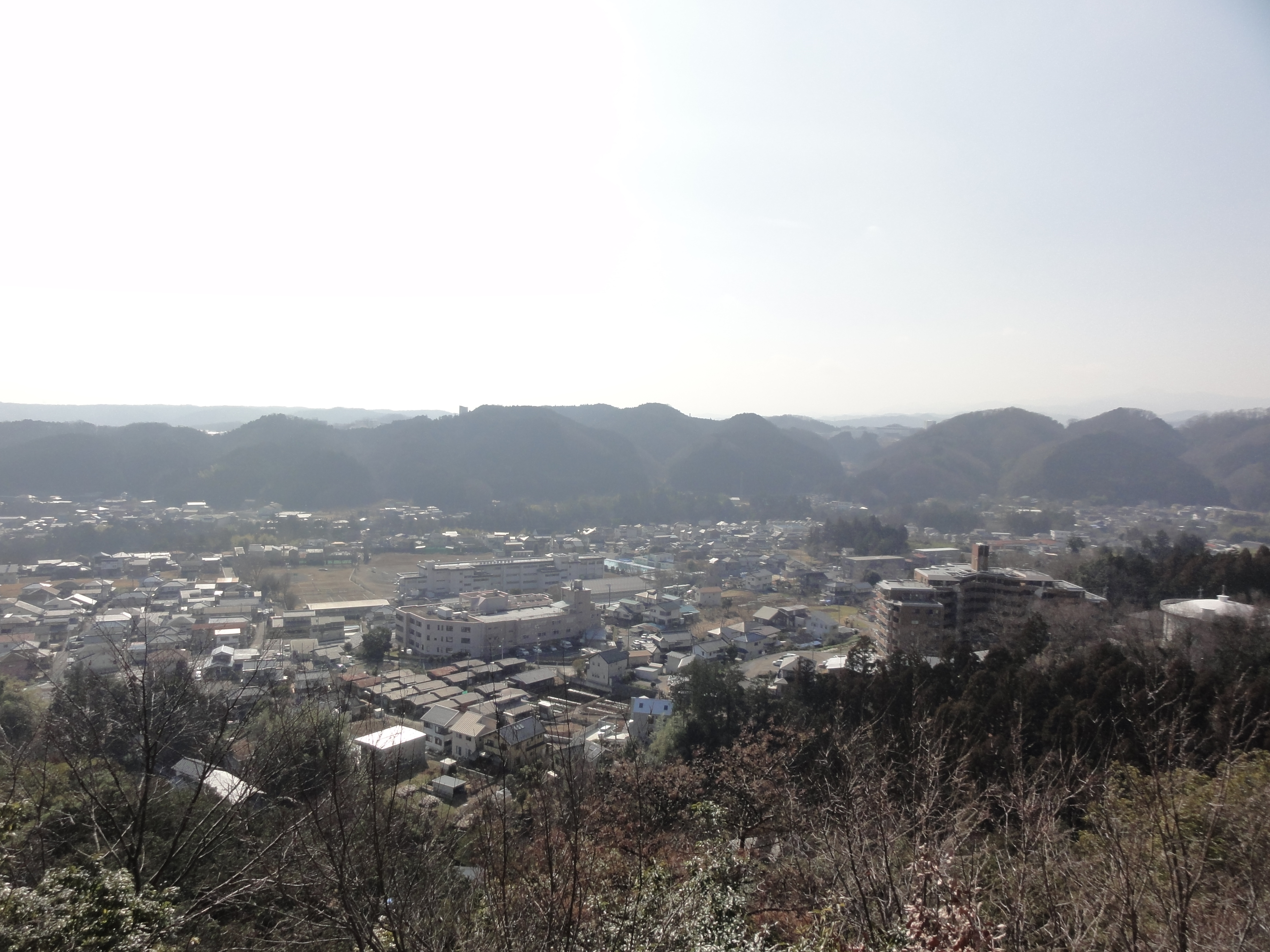
View of Hannō from Mount Tenran

Hannō (飯能市, Hannō-shi) is a city located in Saitama Prefecture, Japan. As of 1 January 2021, the city had an estimated population of 79,123 in 35,440 households and a population density of 410 persons per km^{2}. The total area of the city is 193.05 square kilometres (74.54 sq mi).

== Geography ==
Hannō is located on the southern border of Saitama Prefecture, bordered by Tokyo to the south and Chichibu to the west. Both the Iruma River and the Koma River flow through the city. Hannō is mainly made up of urban and suburban areas, surrounded by mountains and rivers.

=== Surrounding municipalities ===
Saitama Prefecture

- Chichibu
- Hidaka
- Iruma
- Moroyama
- Ogose
- Sayama
- Tokigawa
- Yokoze

Tokyo Metropolis

- Okutama
- Ōme

=== Climate ===
Hannō has a humid subtropical climate (Köppen Cfa) characterized by warm summers and cool winters with light to no snowfall. The average annual temperature in Hannō is 12.6 °C. The average annual rainfall is 1408 mm with September as the wettest month. The temperatures are highest on average in August, at around 24.9 °C, and lowest in January, at around 1.0 °C.

== Demographics ==
Per Japanese census data, the population of Hannō peaked around the year 2000 and has declined slightly over the past 20 years.

Historical population
Year	Pop.	±%
1950	45,524	—
1960	47,413	+4.1%
1970	55,130	+16.3%
1980	63,902	+15.9%
1990	75,794	+18.6%
2000	85,886	+13.3%
2010	83,549	−2.7%
2020	80,361	−3.8%

== History ==
Hannō was traditionally noted for its lumber industry, which developed during the Edo period to supply Edo with timber needed for rebuilding after its frequent fires. The town of Hannō was established within Koma District, Saitama with the establishment of the modern municipalities system on April 1, 1889. Koma District was abolished in 1896, becoming part of Iruma District.

Hannō annexed the neighboring villages of Seimei, Minami-Koma, Kaji and Moto-Kaji on April 1, 1943. It was elevated to city status on January 1, 1954. Hannō annexed the neighboring villages of Agano, Gigshi-Agano, Haraichiba on September 30, 1956. On January 1, 2005, the village of Naguri was merged into Hannō.

== Economy ==
The economy of Hannō is mixed, with a number of pharmaceutical firms and electronics firms maintaining factories in the area. A substantial fraction of the population commutes to Tokyo every day.

== Government ==
Hannō has a mayor-council form of government with a directly elected mayor and a unicameral city council of 19 members. Hannō contributes one member to the Saitama Prefectural Assembly. In terms of national politics, the city is part of Saitama 9th district of the lower house of the Diet of Japan.

== Education ==
- Surugadai University – Hannō campus
- Hannō has 11 public elementary schools and seven public middle schools operated by the city government, and two public high schools operated by the Saitama Prefectural Board of Education. In addition, there are two private middle schools and three private high schools.

== Transportation ==
=== Railway ===
JR East – Hachiko Line

- Higashi-Hannō

Seibu Railway - Seibu Ikebukuro Line/Seibu Chichibu Line

- Hannō - Higashi-Hannō - < Koma - Musashi-Yokote > - Higashi-Agano - Agano - Nishi-Agano - Shōmaru

=== Highway ===
- National Route 299

== Sister cities ==
- Brea, California, United States, since January 5, 1981.

== Local attractions ==
- Akebono Children's Forest Park is a Moomin themed public park for children that opened in 1997.
- Hannō Festival, first weekend of November
- JLPGA Mitsubishi Ladies Golf, late October
- Moomin Valley Park The theme park opened 2019.

== In popular culture ==
The anime series Encouragement of Climb and Train to the End of the World are set in Hannō.

== Noted people from Hannō ==
- Makoto Matsubara, professional baseball player
- Mimura (actress)
- Yasue Sato, model, actress
