= Ohanabatake Station =

Railway station in Chichibu, Saitama Prefecture, Japan

CR31 Ohanabatake Station 御花畑（芝桜）駅
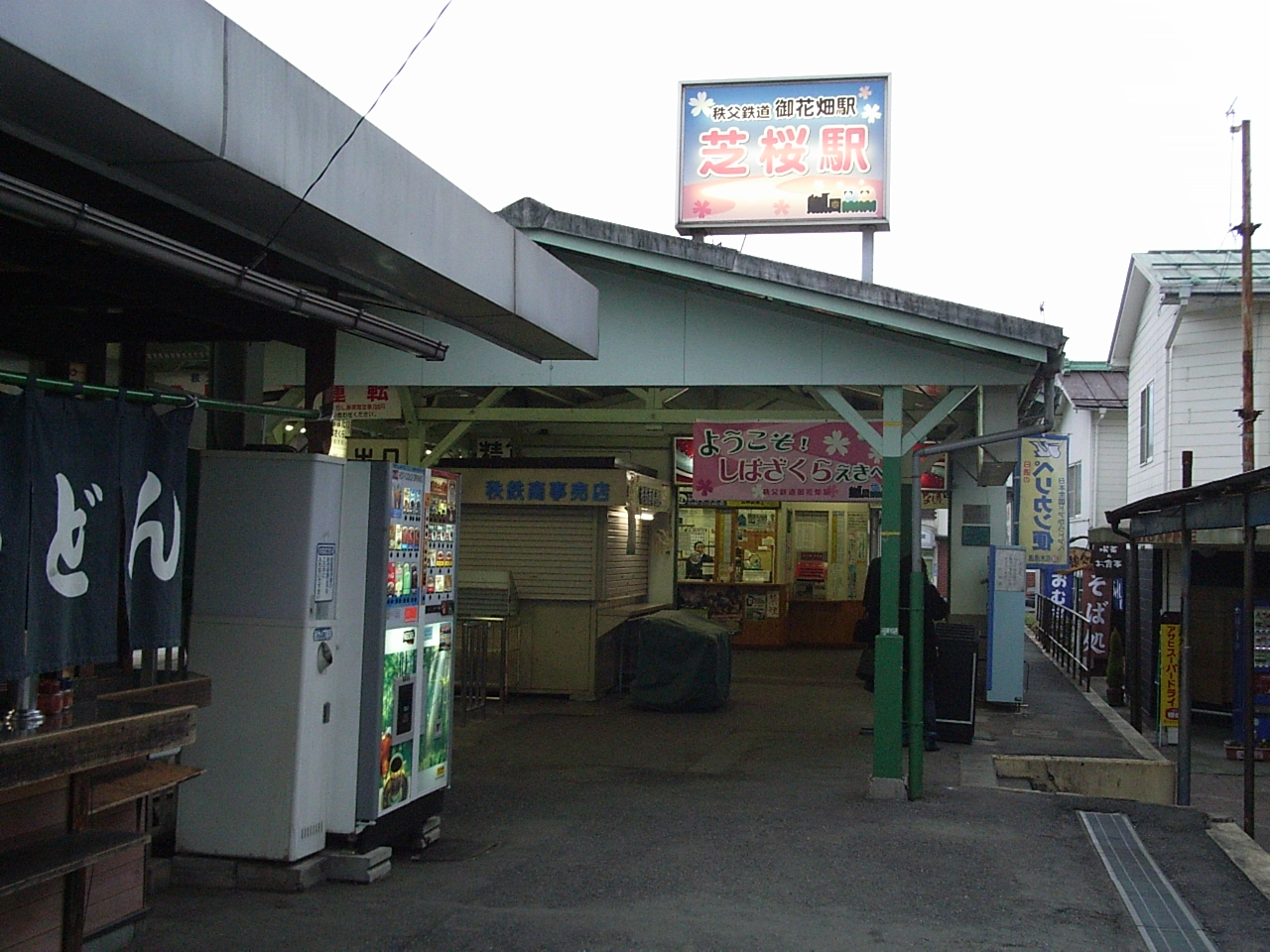
- Ohanabatake Station, April 2009

General information
- Location: 21-3 Higashi-machi, Chichibu-shi, Saitama-ken 368-0042; Japan
- Coordinates: 35°59′33″N 139°05′01″E
- Operator: Chichibu Railway
- Line: ■ Chichibu Main Line
- Distance: 59.7 km from Hanyū
- Platforms: 2 side platforms
- Tracks: 2
- Connections: Seibu-Chichibu Station

Construction
- Structure type: At-grade

Other information
- Status: Staffed
- Website: Official website

History
- Opened: 27 September 1917
- Former names: Ohanabatake (to 2009)

Passengers
- FY2018: 2662 daily

Services
Preceding station	Chichibu Railway	Following station
Mitsumineguchi CR37 Terminus	SL Paleo Express	Chichibu CR30 towards Kumagaya
Kagemori CR32 towards Mitsumineguchi	Chichibu Main Line Rapid Chichibuji; Local	Chichibu CR30 towards Hanyū
Location
- Location within Saitama Prefecture Location within Japan

Ohanabatake Station (御花畑（芝桜）駅, Ohanabatake (Shibazakura)-eki) is a passenger railway station located in the city of Chichibu, Saitama, Japan, operated by the private railway operator Chichibu Railway.

== Lines ==
Ohanabatake Station is served by the Chichibu Main Line from Hanyū to Mitsumineguchi, and is located 59.7 km from Hanyū. It is served by through services to and from the Seibu Chichibu Line, and is also located a short walk from the terminus of the Seibu Chichibu Line, Seibu-Chichibu Station.

== Station layout ==
Track diagram of Ohanabatake and Seibu-Chichibu stations

The station is staffed and consists of two side platforms serving two tracks. Platform 1 acts as a bidirectional platform for Chichibu Main Line services in both directions, while platform 2 is used by Seibu Chichibu Line through-running services to and from Nagatoro.

=== Platforms ===
1	Chichibu Main Line	for Kagemori and Mitsumineguchi
1	Chichibu Main Line	for Chichibu, Yorii, Kumagaya, and Hanyū
2	Seibu Chichibu Line	for Yokoze and Hannō
2	Chichibu Main Line	for Chichibu and Nagatoro (services from Seibu Chichibu Line)

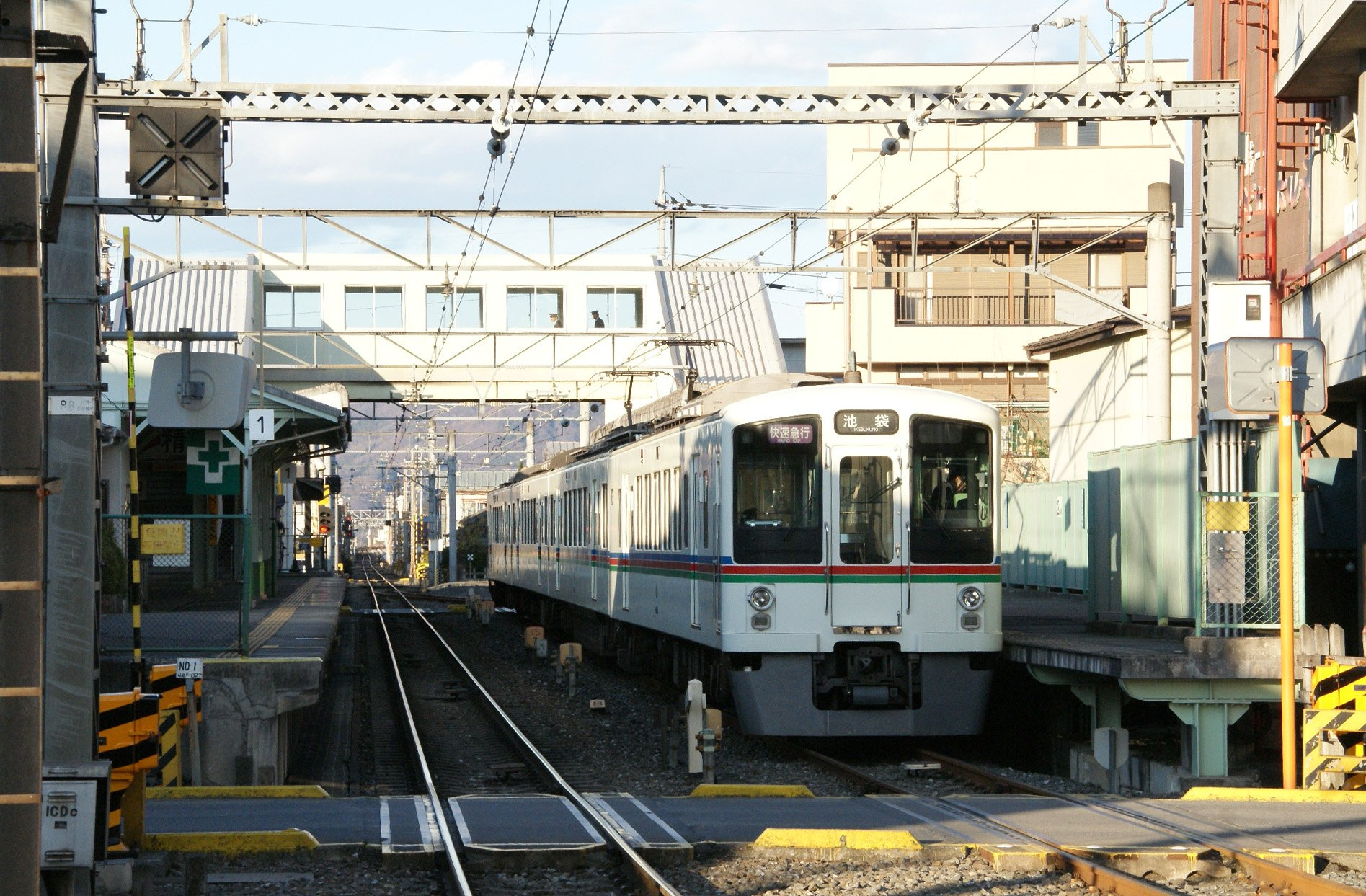
A Seibu 4000 series EMU at platform 2 with a through service to Ikebukuro, December 2010

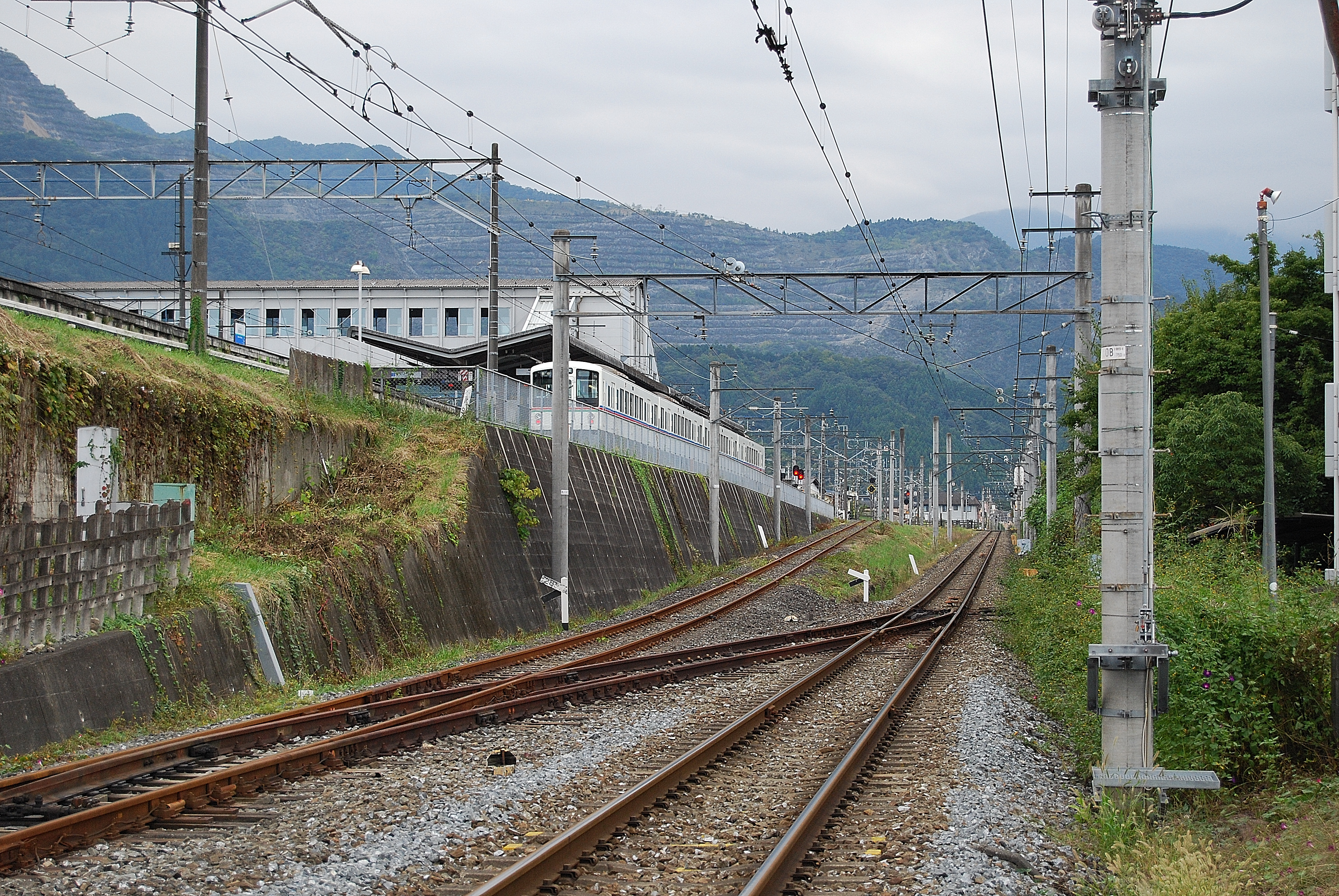
The looking toward Seibu-Chichibu Station from a level crossing to the south of the station

== History ==
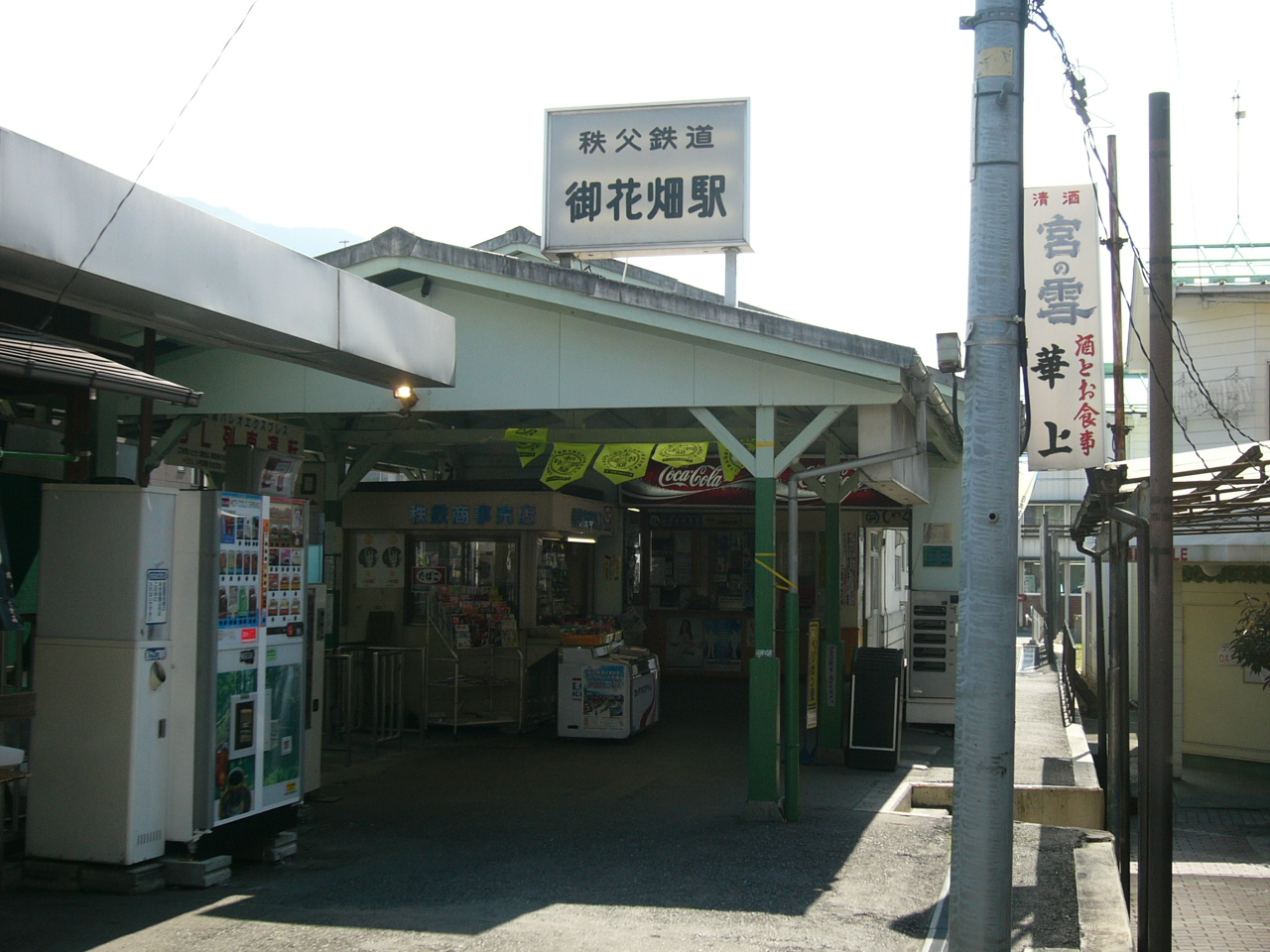
The station in March 2006

Ohanabatake Station opened on 27 September 1917. From 1 April 2009, "Shibazakura" was added in parentheses to the station name, indicating the station's closeness to the nearby Hitsujiyama Park, which is a popular sightseeing destination in early summer when the moss phlox (shibazakura) blooms.

== Passenger statistics ==
In fiscal 2018, the station was used by an average of 2662 passengers daily.

== Surrounding area ==
- Seibu-Chichibu Station (Seibu Chichibu Line)
- Chichibu City Office
- Saitama Prefectural Chichibu High School
- Chichibu Shrine
- Hitsujiyama Park, famous for moss phlox (shibazakura) in early summer
