= Koma Station =

Koma Station or Kōma Station is the name of two train stations in Japan:

- Koma Station (Saitama) - (高麗駅) in Saitama Prefecture
- Kōma Station (Iwate) - (好摩駅) in Iwate Prefecture
