= Yokoze =

Yokoze 横瀬町
- Town
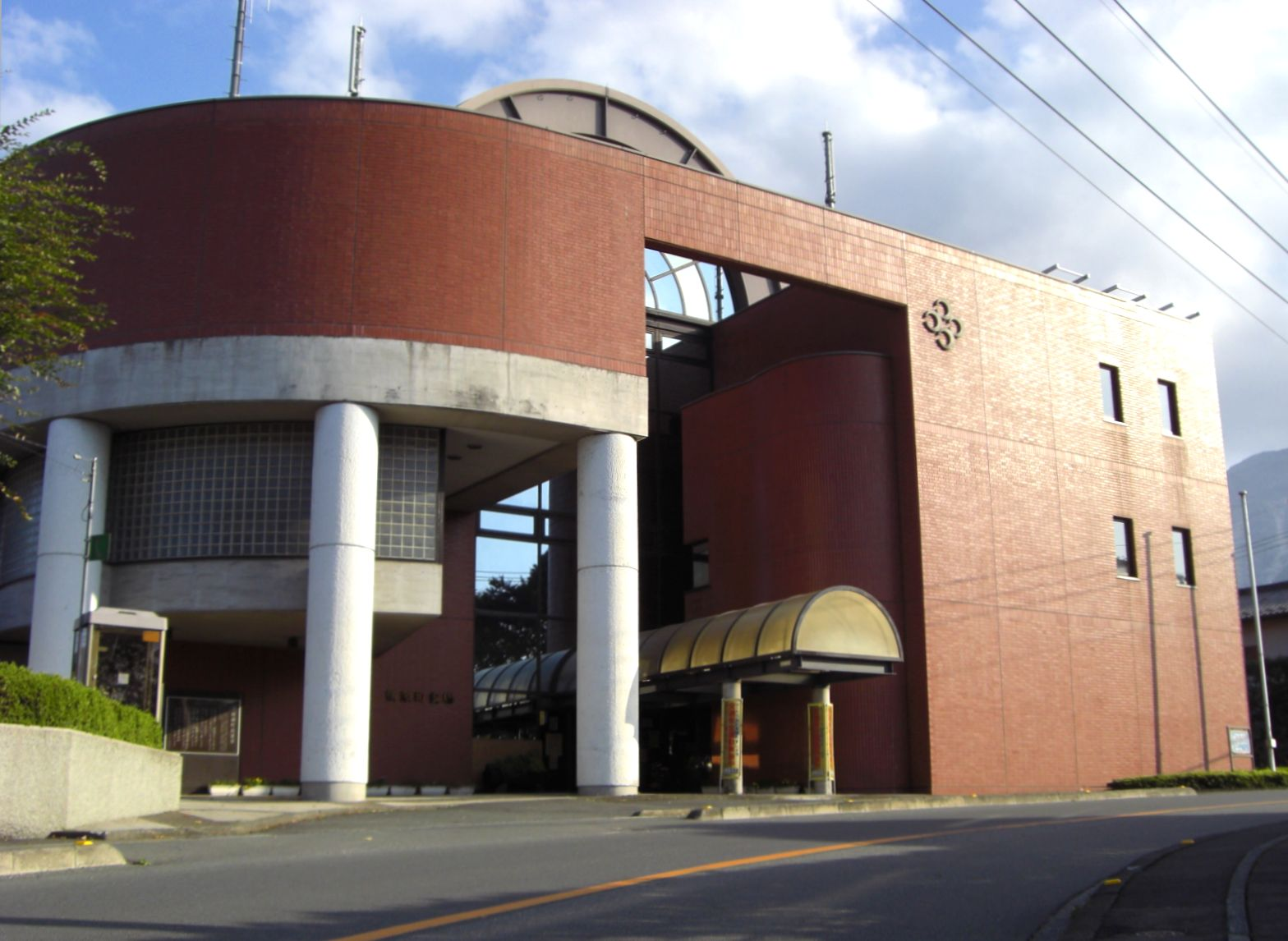
- Yokoze town office

- Flag Seal

- Location of Yokoze in Saitama Prefecture

- Coordinates: 35°59′14.3″N 139°6′0.3″E
- Country: Japan
- Region: Kantō
- Prefecture: Saitama
- District: Chichibu

Area
  - Total: 49.36 km^{2} (19.06 sq mi)

Population (February 2016)
  - Total: 8,106
  - Density: 172/km^{2} (450/sq mi)
- Time zone: UTC+9 (Japan Standard Time)
- Tree: Acer
- Flower: Sakura
- Bird: Common kingfisher
- Phone number: 0494-25-0111
- Address: Yokoze 4545, Yokoze-machi, Chichibu-gun, Saitama-ken 368-0072
- Website: Official website

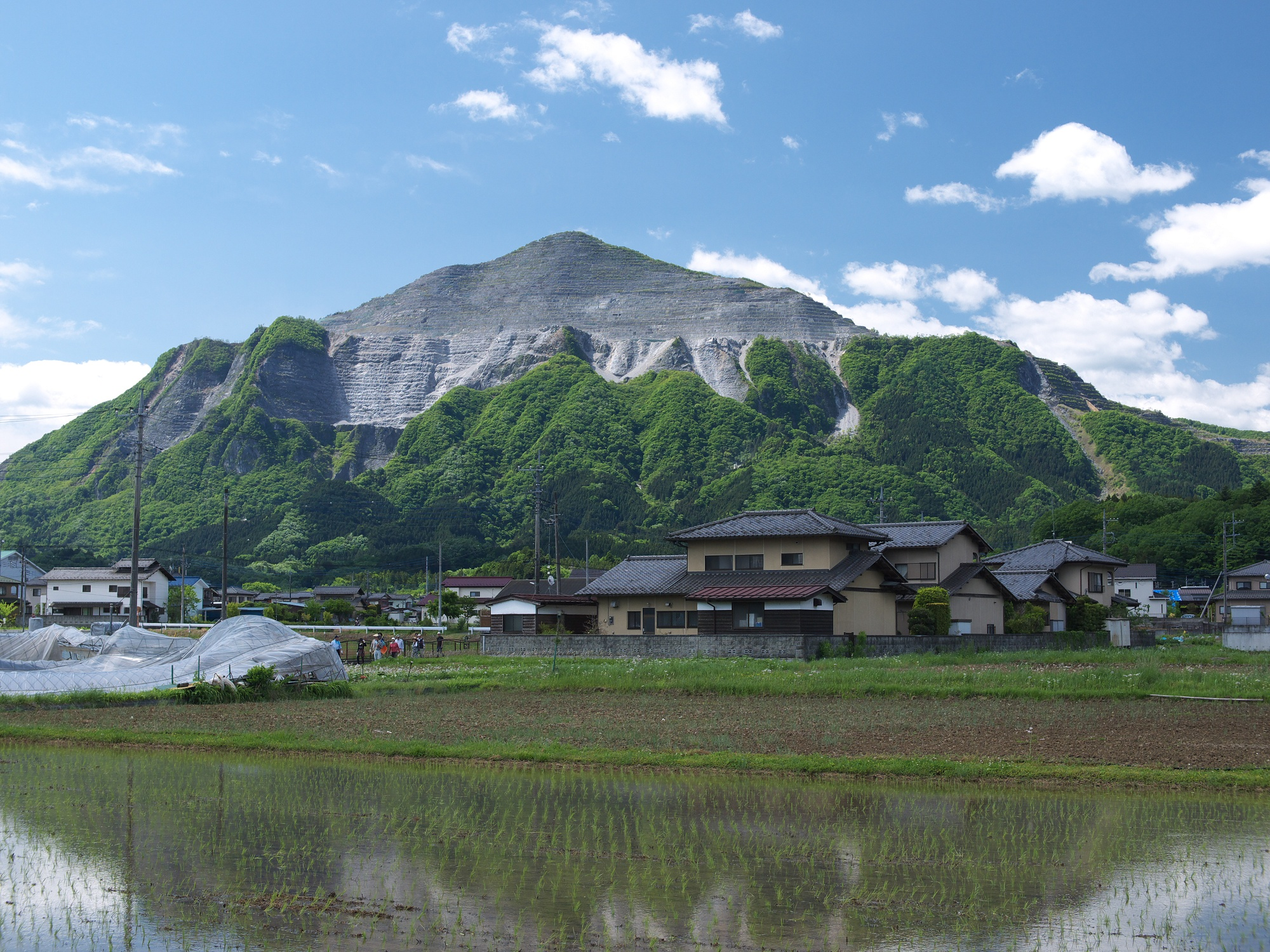
Mount Bukō

Yokoze (横瀬町, Yokoze-machi) is a town located in Saitama Prefecture, Japan. As of 1 March 2021, the town had an estimated population of 8,106 in 3347 households and a population density of 172 persons per km^{2}. The total area of the town is 49.26 square kilometres (19.02 sq mi).

== Geography ==
Located in western Saitama Prefecture to the north of Mount Bukō, Yokoze is in the southeast portion of the Chichibu Plains. It is only 1.5 kilometers from the center of the city of Chichibu. Most of the town is mountainous with some flat land in the Yokose River basin that runs northwest of the town, where the main population concentration and town hall are located.

=== Surrounding municipalities ===
Saitama Prefecture

- Chichibu
- Hannō
- Tokigawa

=== Climate ===
Yokoze has a humid subtropical climate (Köppen Cfa) characterized by warm summers and cool winters with light to no snowfall. The average annual temperature in Yokoze is 12.4 °C. The average annual rainfall is 1746 mm with September as the wettest month. The temperatures are highest on average in August, at around 23.7 °C, and lowest in January, at around 1.0 °C.

== Demographics ==
Per Japanese census data, the population of Yokoze peaked around the year 1990 and has declined since.

Historical population
Year	Pop.	±%
1920	5,616	—
1930	6,345	+13.0%
1940	6,359	+0.2%
1950	7,196	+13.2%
1960	7,163	−0.5%
1970	8,090	+12.9%
1980	9,511	+17.6%
1990	10,073	+5.9%
2000	9,782	−2.9%
2010	9,039	−7.6%
2020	7,979	−11.7%

== History ==
The village of Yokoze was created within Chichibu District, Saitama with the establishment of the modern municipalities system on April 1, 1889. In 1955, Yokoze annexed the neighboring village of Ashigakubo. It was elevated to town status on October 1, 1984.

== Government ==
Yokoze has a mayor-council form of government with a directly elected mayor and a unicameral town council of 12 members. Yokoze, together with the towns of Higashichichibu, Minano, Nagatoro and Ogano, contributes one member to the Saitama Prefectural Assembly. In terms of national politics, the town is part of Saitama 11th district of the lower house of the Diet of Japan.

== Economy ==
Yokoze is largely a bedroom community due to its proximity to the city of Chichibu. The main industry is the limestone mining industry produced from Mt. Buko.

== Education ==
Yokoze has one public elementary school and one public middle school operated by the town government. The town does not have a high school.

== Transportation ==
=== Railway ===
Seibu Railway - Seibu Chichibu Line

- Ashigakubo - Yokoze

=== Highway ===
- National Route 299

== Local attractions ==
- Chichibu 34 Kannon Sanctuary
- Mount Bukō
