= Seibu Chichibu Line =

Railway line in Japan

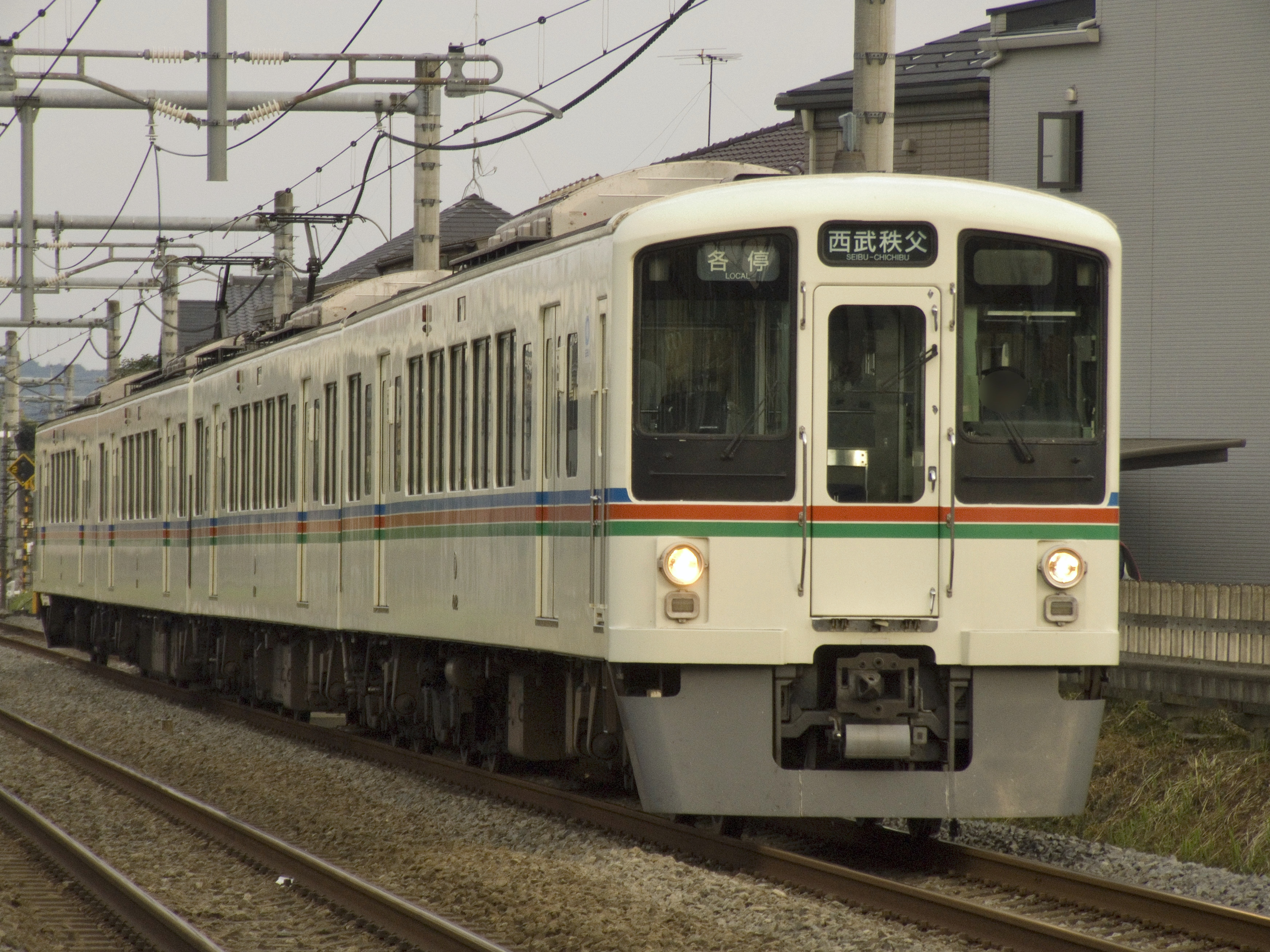
- A Seibu Chichibu Line 4000 series train

Overview
- Native name: 西武秩父線
- Status: In service
- Owner: Seibu Railway Co., Ltd.
- Locale: Kanto region
- Termini: Agano; Seibu Chichibu
- Stations: 6

Service
- Type: Commuter rail
- System: Seibu Railway
- Route number: SI
- Operator(s): Seibu Railway Co., Ltd.

History
- Opened: 14 October 1969; 56 years ago

Technical
- Line length: 19.0 km (11.8 mi)
- Number of tracks: Single-track
- Track gauge: 1,067 mm (3 ft 6 in)
- Electrification: 1,500 V DC (overhead catenary)
- Operating speed: 105 km/h (65 mph)

The Seibu Chichibu Line (西武秩父線, Seibu Chichibu-sen) is a railway line in Saitama Prefecture, Japan, operated by Seibu Railway. It is an extension of the Ikebukuro Line, and connects Agano Station and Seibu-Chichibu Station.

== Stations ==
Abbreviations here are for the table below and are not formally used.

Local (各停, Kakutei) Stops at all stations.

S-Train (エストレイン, Esutorein) (ST)

Morning and evening reserved-seat services between Seibu-Chichibu and Motomachi-Chūkagai via the Tokyo Metro Fukutoshin Line, Tokyu Toyoko Line and Minatomirai Lines on weekends.

Limited Express (特急, Tokkyū) (LE): Trains named Chichibu (ちちぶ), from Ikebukuro to Seibu-Chichibu, with supplementary limited express charge.

Despite the Seibu Chichibu Line only spanning Agano to Seibu-Chichibu, all trains operate through service to the Seibu Ikebukuro Line via Agano Station until at least Hannō Station.

No.	Station	Japanese	Distance (km) to Ikebukuro	ST	LE	Transfers	Location	
SI31	Agano	吾野	57.8	|	|	Ikebukuro Line (SI31)	Hannō	Saitama
SI32	Nishi-Agano	西吾野	61.4	|	|		Hannō	Saitama
SI33	Shōmaru	正丸	64.1	|	|		Hannō	Saitama
SI34	Ashigakubo	芦ヶ久保	70.2	|	* (Note: Limited express trains do not stop here except for certain periods of the year, such as around Golden Week and late July.)		Yokoze, Chichibu; District	Saitama
SI35	Yokoze	横瀬	74.2	|	O		Yokoze, Chichibu; District	Saitama
SI36	Seibu-Chichibu	西武秩父	76.8	O	O	Chichibu Main Line (Ohanabatake: CR31)	Chichibu	Saitama

== History ==
The entire line was opened on October 14, 1969, after over two years of construction, considerably shortening the travel time between Chichibu and Tokyo. Twenty years later, on April 1, 1989, a connection opened to the Chichibu Railway's Chichibu Main Line, and through service began. On March 28, 1996, freight services between Higashi-Yokoze freight terminal and Shin-Akitsu (on the Seibu Ikebukuro Line) ceased. On March 12, 2003, "wanman" (one man) driver only operation began. Until March 8, 2020 there were two Rapid Express round trips from Ikebukuro bound for Nagatoro and Mitsumineguchi.
