= Yokoze Station =

Railway station in Yokoze, Saitama Prefecture, Japan

Coordinates: 35°59′04″N 139°05′54″E

SI35 Yokoze Station 横瀬駅
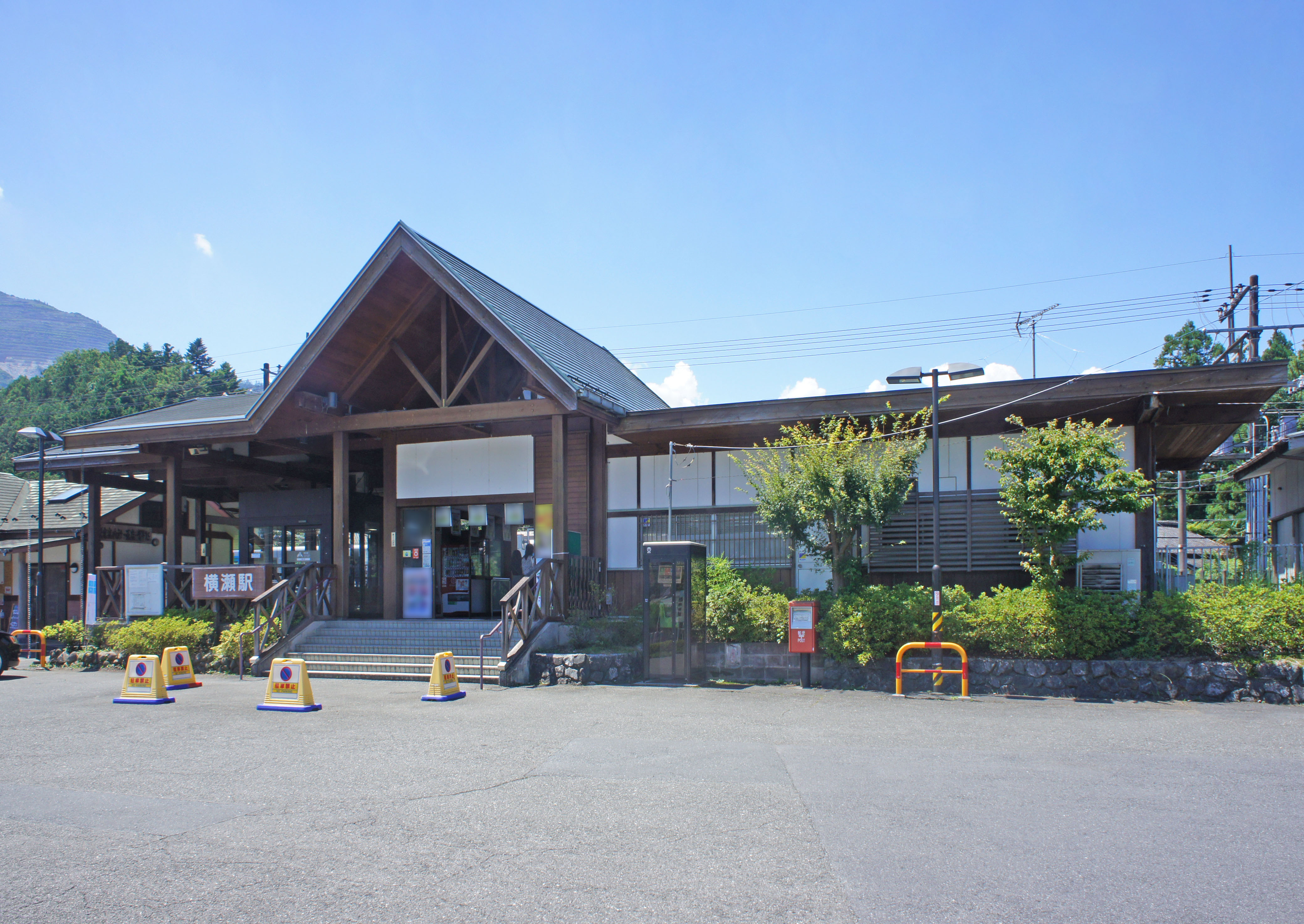
- Station building, July 2022

General information
- Location: 4067 Yokoze, Yokoze-machi, Chichibu-gun, Saitama-ken 368-0072; Japan
- Operator: Seibu Railway
- Line: Seibu Chichibu Line
- Distance: 16.4 km from Agano
- Platforms: 1 island platform

Other information
- Station code: SI35
- Website: Official website

History
- Opened: 14 October 1969

Passengers
- FY2019: 1,712 daily

Services
| Preceding station | Seibu Railway | Following station |
|---|---|---|
| Seibu-Chichibu SI36 Terminus | Chichibu | Hannō SI26 towards Ikebukuro |
| Seibu-Chichibu SI36 Terminus | Seibu Chichibu Line | Ashigakubo SI34 towards Agano |
Location
- Location within Saitama Prefecture

Yokoze Station (横瀬駅, Yokoze-eki) is a passenger railway station located in the town of Yokoze, Saitama, Japan, operated by the private railway operator Seibu Railway.

== Lines ==
Yokoze Station is served by the Seibu Chichibu Line to Seibu-Chichibu and is 16.4 kilometers from the official starting point of the line at Agano.

== Station layout ==
The station consists of one island platform serving two tracks, connected to the station building by a level crossing.

=== Platforms ===
| 1 | Seibu Chichibu Line | for Hannō; Seibu Ikebukuro Line for Tokorozawa and Ikebukuro |
| 2 | Seibu Chichibu Line | for Seibu-Chichibu |

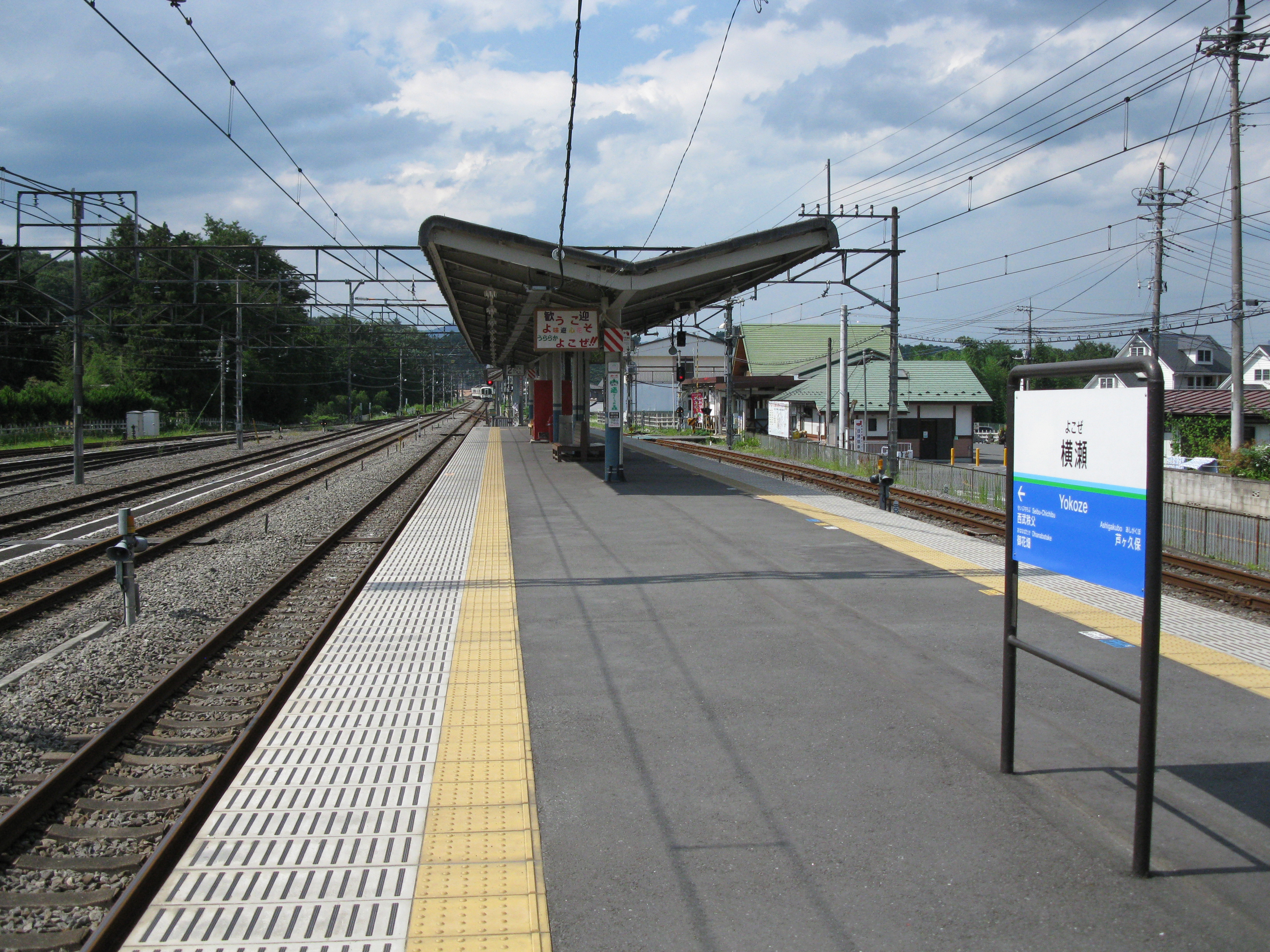
The platform in August 2009

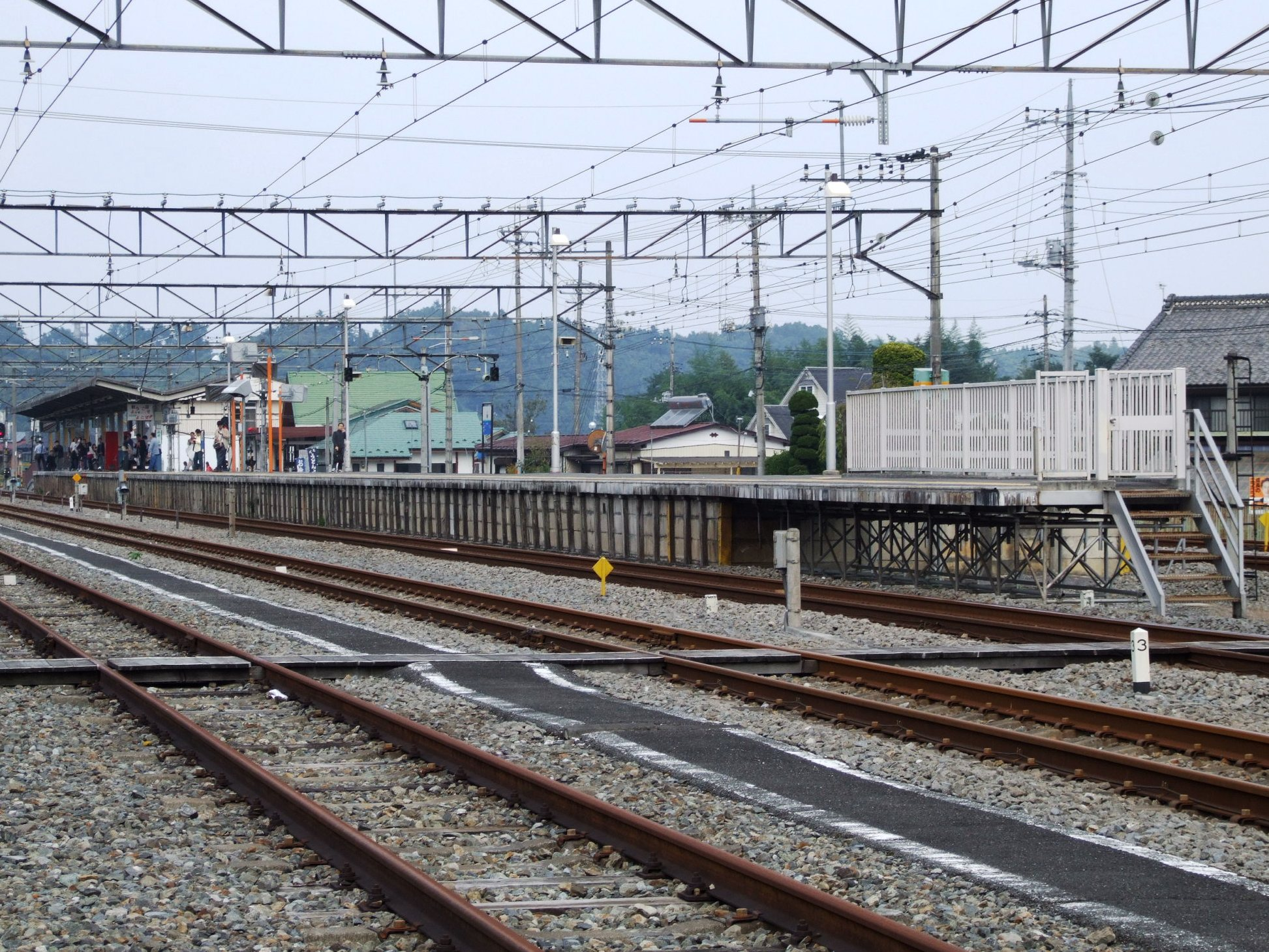
The platform in October 2008

== History ==
The station opened on 14 October 1969. A new station building was completed in 1992.

Station numbering was introduced on all Seibu Railway lines during fiscal 2012, with Yokoze Station becoming "SI35".

== Passenger statistics ==
In fiscal 2019, the station was the 85th busiest on the Seibu network with an average of 1712 passengers daily. The passenger figures for previous years are as shown below.

| Fiscal year | Daily average |
|---|---|
| 2000 | 1,533 |
| 2005 | 1,801 |
| 2010 | 1,770 |
| 2015 | 1,878 |

== Surrounding area ==
- National Route 299
- Yokoze Town Hall
- Yokoze History and Culture Museum
- Yokoze Post Office
- Yokoze River

== See also ==
- List of railway stations in Japan
