= Agano Station =

Railway station in Hannō, Saitama Prefecture, Japan

SI31 Agano Station 吾野駅
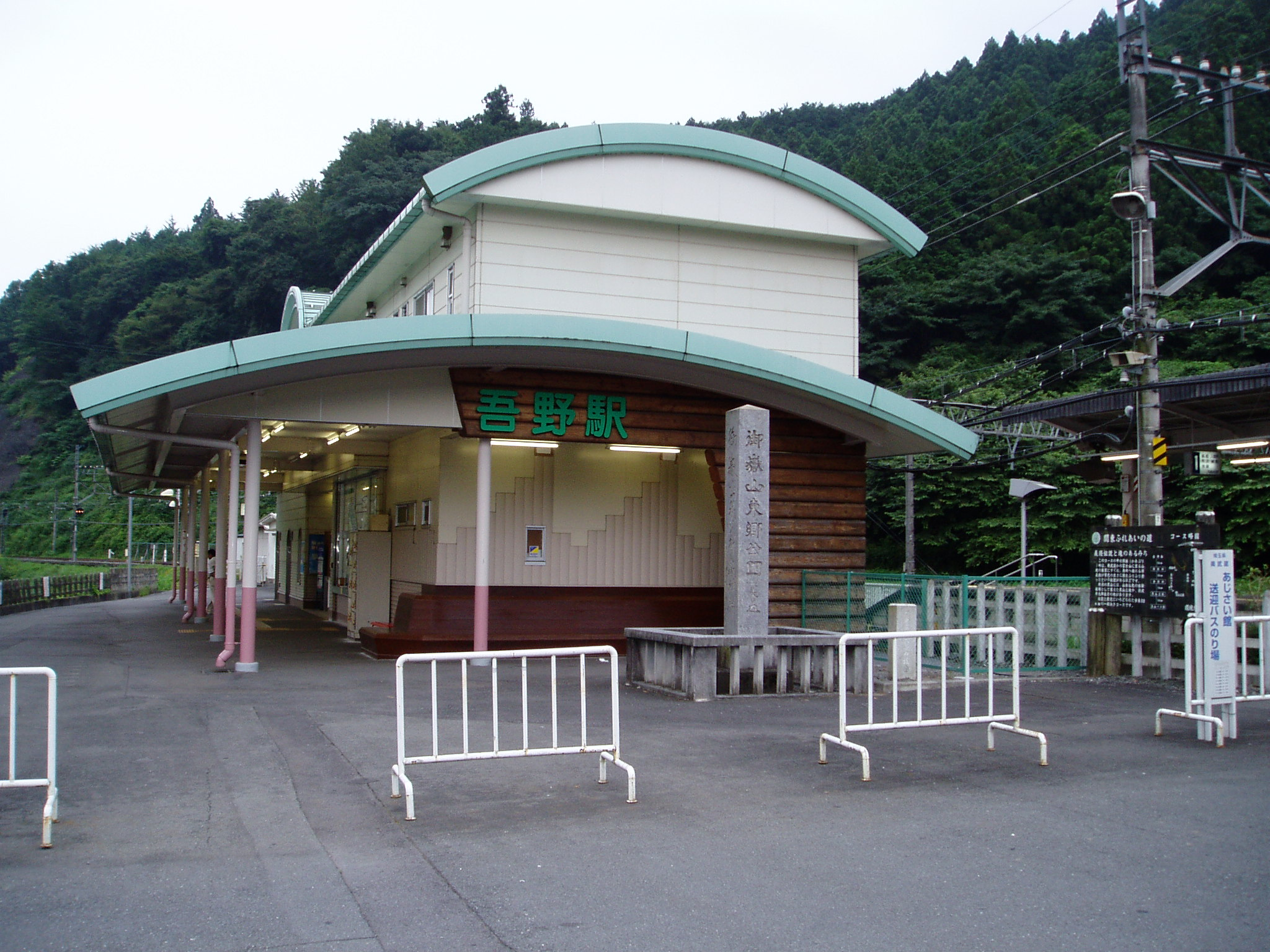
- Agano Station in August 2006

General information
- Location: 326-1 Sakaishimachibun, Hannō-shi, Saitama-ken 357-0213; Japan
- Coordinates: 35°54′30″N 139°13′33″E
- Operator: Seibu Railway
- Lines: Seibu Ikebukuro Line; Seibu Chichibu Line
- Distance: 57.8 km from Ikebukuro
- Platforms: 1 island platform
- Tracks: 2

Other information
- Station code: SI31
- Website: Official website

History
- Opened: 10 September 1929

Passengers
- FY2019: 617 (Daily)

Services
Preceding station	Seibu Railway	Following station
through to Seibu Chichibu Line	Ikebukuro Line Local	Higashi-Agano SI30 towards Ikebukuro
Nishi-Agano SI32 towards Seibu-Chichibu	Seibu Chichibu Line	through to Ikebukuro Line
Location
- Location within Saitama Prefecture Location within Japan

Agano Station (吾野駅, Agano-eki) is a passenger railway station located in the city of Hannō, Saitama, Japan, operated by the private railway operator Seibu Railway.

== Lines ==
Agano Station is served by the Seibu Ikebukuro Line from Ikebukuro in Tokyo, and is 57.8 km (35.9 mi) from the official starting point of the line at Ikebukuro Station. It also forms the starting point of the 19 km (12 mi) Seibu Chichibu Line to Seibu Chichibu.

== Station layout ==
This station consists of a single island platform serving two tracks, connected to the station building by a level crossing.

=== Platforms ===
1	Seibu Ikebukuro Line	for Hannō, Tokorozawa, and Ikebukuro
2	Seibu Chichibu Line	for Yokoze and Seibu-Chichibu

== History ==
The station opened on 10 September 1929. A new station building was completed on 24 August 1997.

Station numbering was introduced on all Seibu Railway lines during fiscal 2012, with Agano Station becoming "SI31".

== Passenger statistics ==
In fiscal 2019, the station was the 87th busiest on the Seibu network with an average of 617 passengers daily. The passenger figures for previous years are as shown below.

Fiscal year	Daily average
2009	956
2010	878
2011	793
2012	821
2013	756

== Surrounding area ==
- Komagawa River
- National Route 299
- Agano Post Office
- Chichibu Ontake Shrine

== See also ==
- List of railway stations in Japan
