= Seibu-Chichibu Station =

Railway station in Chichibu, Saitama Prefecture, Japan

SI36 Seibu-Chichibu Station 西武秩父駅
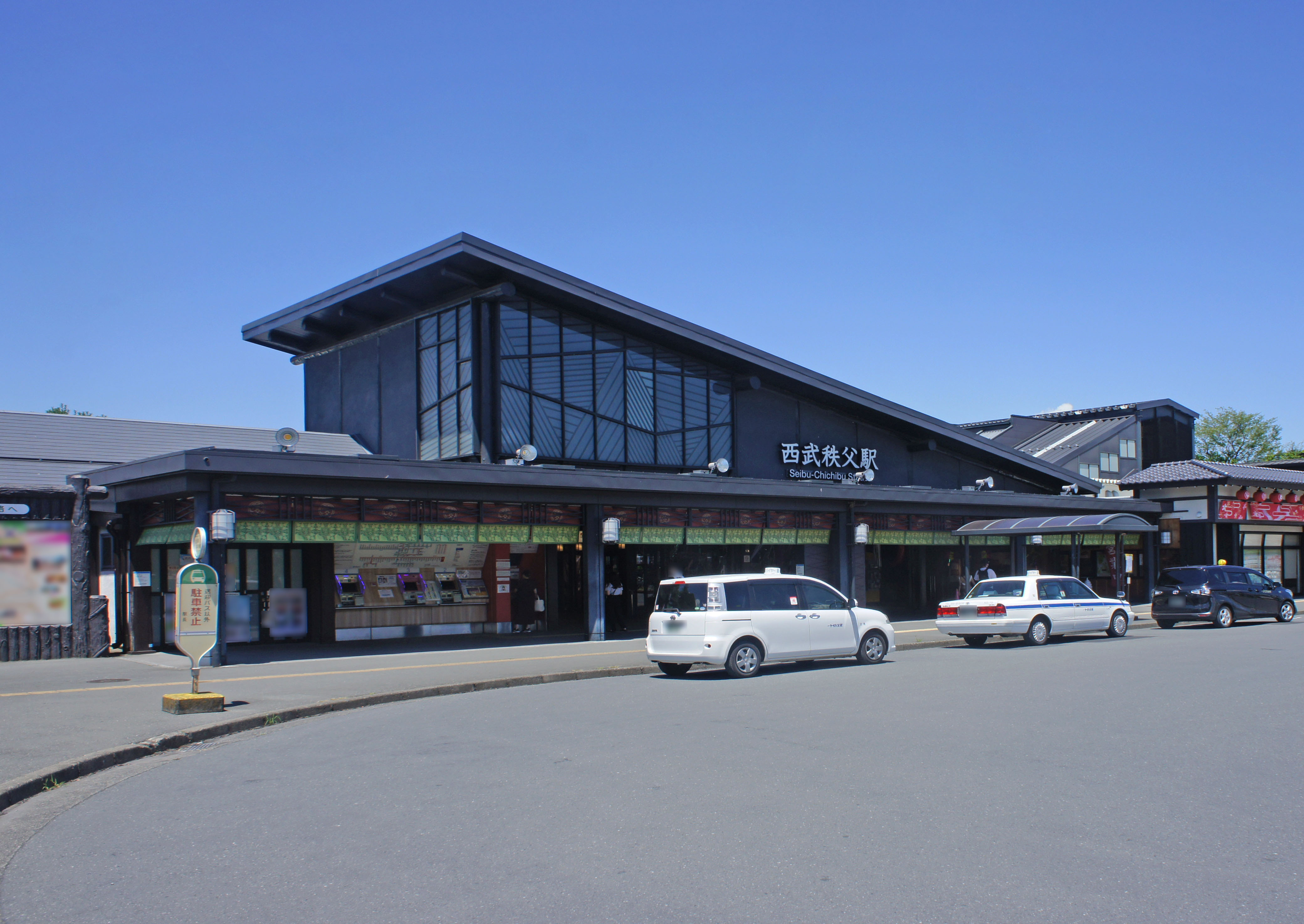
- Station building, July 2022

General information
- Location: 1-16-15 Nosakamachi, Chichibu-shi, Saitama-can 368-0033; Japan
- Coordinates: 35°59′24″N 139°04′59″E
- Operator: Seibu Railway
- Line: Seibu Chichibu Line
- Distance: 19.0 km from Agano
- Platforms: 1 side + 1 island platform
- Tracks: 3+
- Connections: Bus stop; Ohanabatake Station (Chichibu Main Line)

Other information
- Station code: SI36
- Website: Official website

History
- Opened: 14 October 1969

Passengers
- FY2018: 7,229 daily

Services
Preceding station	Seibu Railway	Following station
Ohanabatake towards Seibu-Chichibu	Chichibu	Yokoze SI35 towards Ikebukuro
Terminus	S-Train Weekends (Weekends and national holidays)	Hannō SI26 towards Motomachi-Chūkagai
Terminus	Seibu Chichibu Line	Yokoze SI35 towards Agano
Location
- Location within Saitama Prefecture

Seibu-Chichibu Station (西武秩父駅, Seibu-Chichibu-eki) is a passenger railway station located in the city of Chichibu, Saitama, Japan, operated by the private railway operator Seibu Railway.

== Lines ==
Diagram of Seibu-Chichibu and Ohanabatake

Seibu-Chichibu Station is the terminus station of the Seibu Chichibu Line, and is located 19.0 km from the opposing terminus of then line at Agano. Some Seibu trains continue to Mitsumineguchi Station on the Chichibu Main Line of Chichibu Railway via a crossover between the two lines. Some Seibu trains also run to Nagatoro Station in the opposite direction of the Chichibu Main Line, however those trains do not stop at Seibu-Chichibu Station due to the layout of the crossover track.

Ohanabatake Station on the Chichibu Railway Chichibu Main Line is within walking distance from this station.

== Station layout ==
The station consists of one island platform and one side platform serving three tracks. The side platform is adjacent to the station building, which is connected to the island platform by a footbridge.

=== Platforms ===
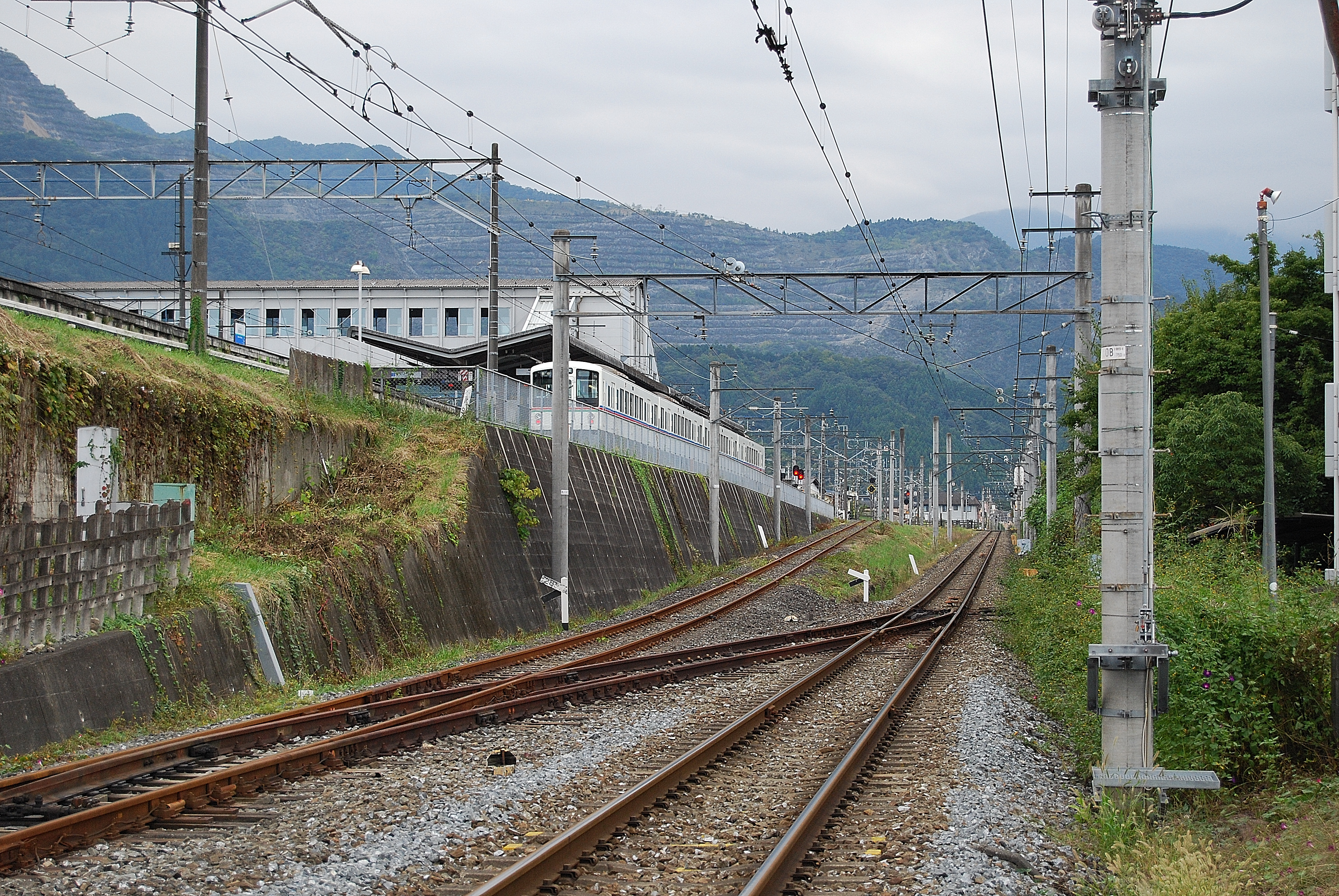
Seibu-Chichibu Station viewed from the Chichibu Main Line to the south of Ohanabatake Station

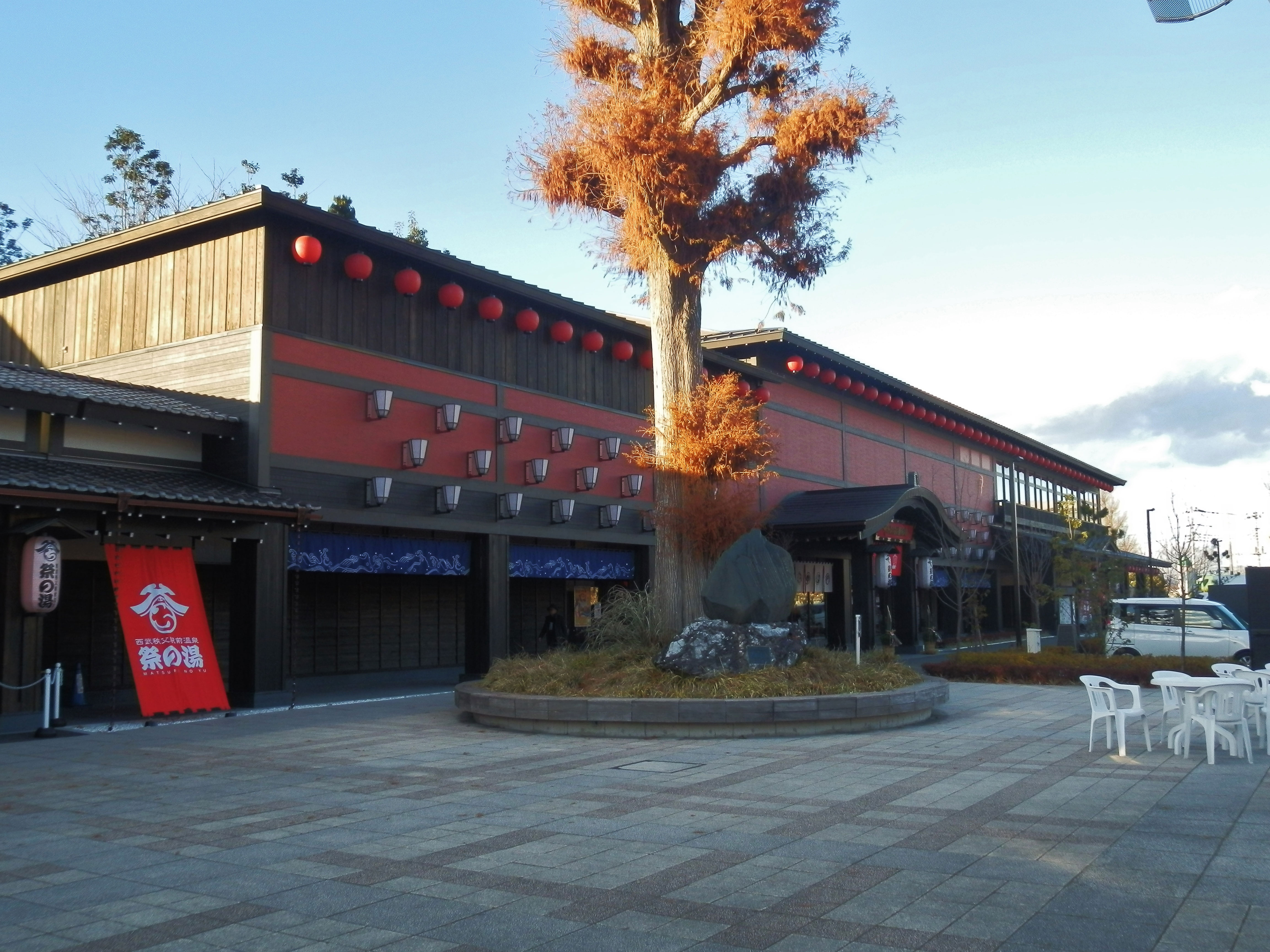
Seibu Chichibu Ekimae Onsen Matsurinoyu

1	Seibu Chichibu Line	for Hannō; Seibu Ikebukuro Line for Ikebukuro (Chichibu limited express services)
2/3	Seibu Chichibu Line	for Hannō; Seibu Ikebukuro Line for Ikebukuro

== History ==
The station opened on 14 October 1969.

Station numbering was introduced on all Seibu Railway lines during fiscal 2012, with Seibu-Chichibu Station becoming "SI36".

== Passenger statistics ==
In fiscal 2018, the station was used by an average of 7229 passengers daily.

The passenger figures for previous years are as shown below.

Fiscal year	Daily average
2009	7,194
2010	6,919
2011	6,691
2012	6,655
2013	6,814

== Surrounding area ==
- Ohanabatake Station (Chichibu Main Line)
- Chichibu City Office
- Chichibu Municipal Library
- Chichibu Tax Office
- Chichibu Shrine
- Hitsujiyama Park
- National Route 140
