= Hannō Station =

Railway station in Hannō, Saitama Prefecture, Japan

SI26 Hannō Station 飯能駅
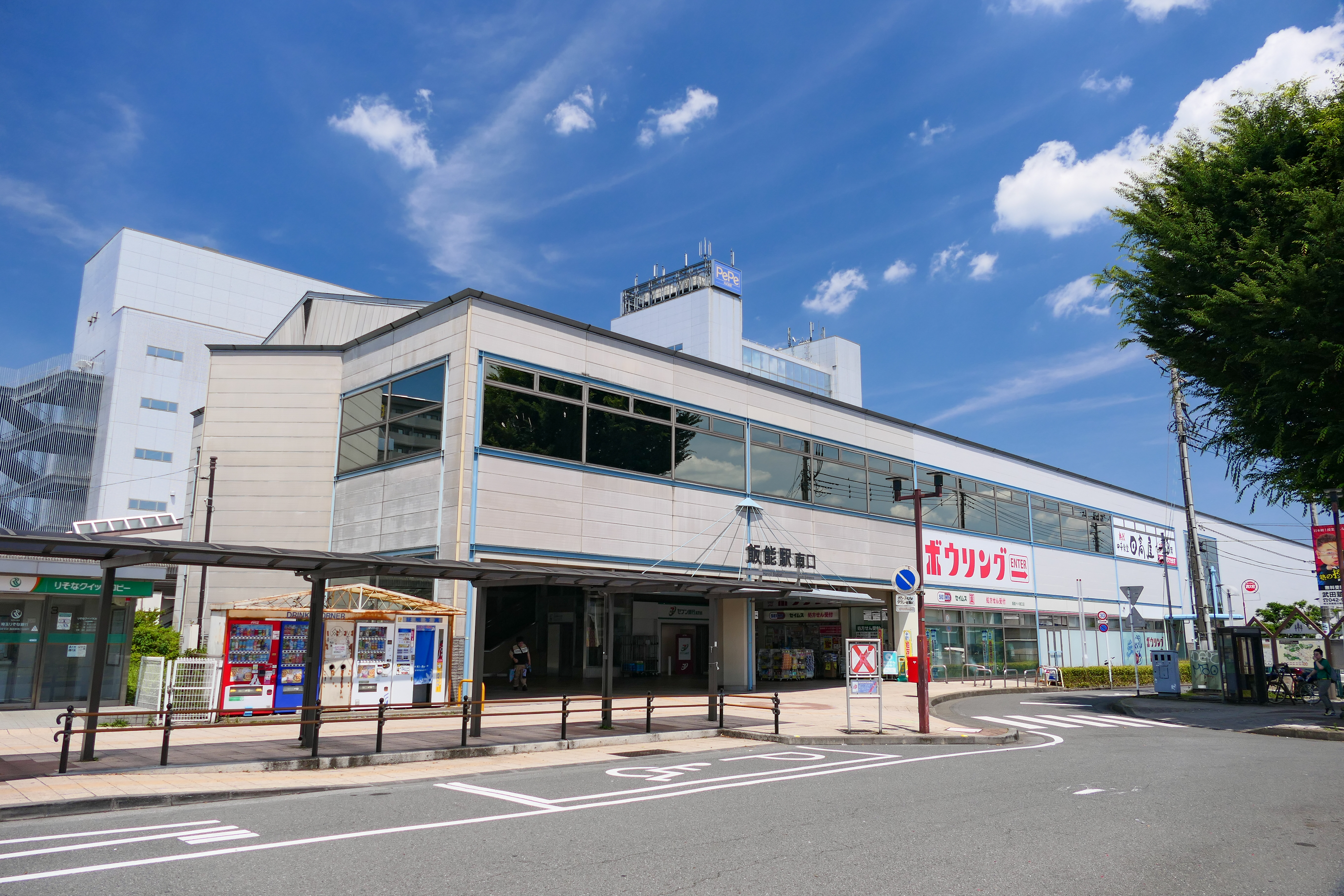
- Hannō Station south exit in June 2024

General information
- Location: 11-21 Nakachō, Hannō-shi, Saitama-ken 357-0035; Japan
- Coordinates: 35°51′05″N 139°19′06″E
- Operator: Seibu Railway
- Line: Ikebukuro Line
- Distance: 43.7 km from Ikebukuro
- Platforms: 1 side + 2 island platforms
- Connections: Bus stop

Other information
- Station code: SI26

History
- Opened: 15 April 1915; 111 years ago

Passengers
- FY2019: 32,929 daily
Services
Preceding station	Seibu Railway	Following station
Yokoze SI35 towards Seibu-Chichibu	Chichibu	Irumashi SI23 towards Ikebukuro
Terminus	Musashi	Irumashi SI23 towards Ikebukuro
Seibu-Chichibu SI36 Terminus	S-Train Weekends (Weekends and national holidays)	Irumashi SI23 towards Motomachi-Chūkagai
Terminus	F Liner	Irumashi SI23 towards Motomachi-Chūkagai
Terminus	Ikebukuro Line Rapid Express	Irumashi SI23 towards Ikebukuro or Nerima
Terminus	Ikebukuro Line Express Commuter Express Rapid Semi Express	Motokaji SI25 towards Ikebukuro
Higashi-Hannō SI27 towards Agano	Ikebukuro Line Local	Motokaji SI25 towards Ikebukuro
Location
- Location within Saitama Prefecture

Hannō Station (飯能駅, Hannō-eki) is a passenger railway station located in the city of Hannō, Saitama, Japan, operated by the private railway operator Seibu Railway.

== Lines ==
Hannō Station is served by the Seibu Ikebukuro Line from Ikebukuro in Tokyo, with some services inter-running via the Tokyo Metro Yurakucho Line to Shin-Kiba and the Tokyo Metro Fukutoshin Line to Shibuya and onward via the Tokyu Toyoko Line and Minato Mirai Line to Motomachi-Chukagai. Located between Motokaji and Higashi-Hannō, it is 43.7 km from the Ikebukuro terminus. Hannō is a terminating station, with trains continuing to Seibu-Chichibu reversing here.

== Station layout ==
Track diagram

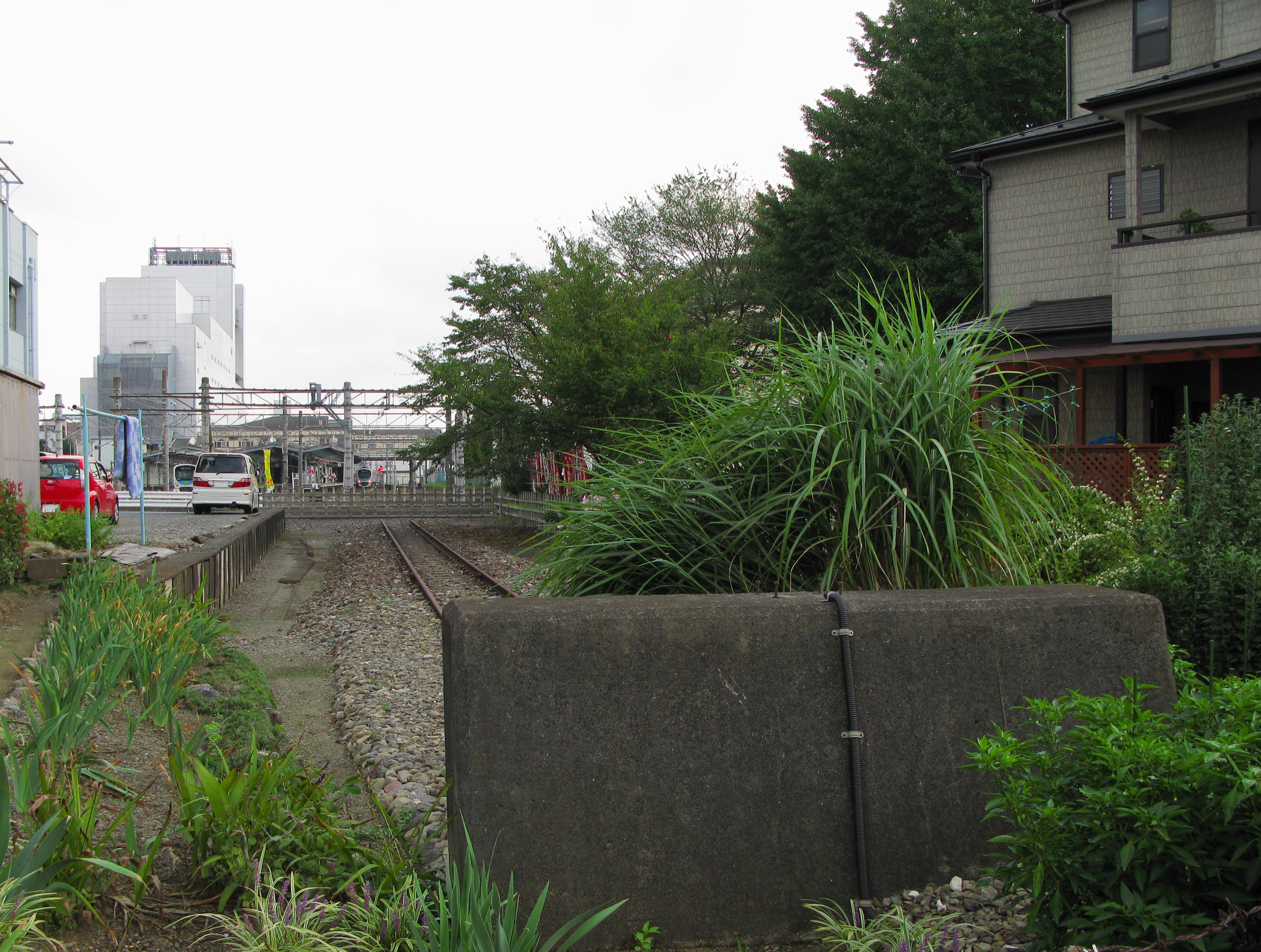
Buffer stop at the end of a severed former run-round track to the west of the station, October 2010

The station consists of one ground-level side platform and two island platforms, serving a total of four terminating tracks.

=== Platforms ===
1	Seibu Ikebukuro Line	for Tokorozawa, Nerima, and Ikebukuro; Tokyo Metro Yurakucho Line for Shin-Kiba; Tokyo Metro Fukutoshin Line for Shibuya; Tōkyū Tōyoko Line for Yokohama; Minatomirai Line for Motomachi-Chukagai
2/3	Seibu Ikebukuro Line	for Seibu-Chichibu
4	Seibu Ikebukuro Line	for Tokorozawa, Nerima, and Ikebukuro; Tokyo Metro Yurakucho Line for Shin-Kiba; Tokyo Metro Fukutoshin Line for Shibuya; Tōkyū Tōyoko Line for Yokohama; Minatomirai Line for Motomachi-Chukagai
5	Seibu Ikebukuro Line	for Tokorozawa and Ikebukuro (Limited express services) for Seibu-Chichibu (Limited express services)

== History ==
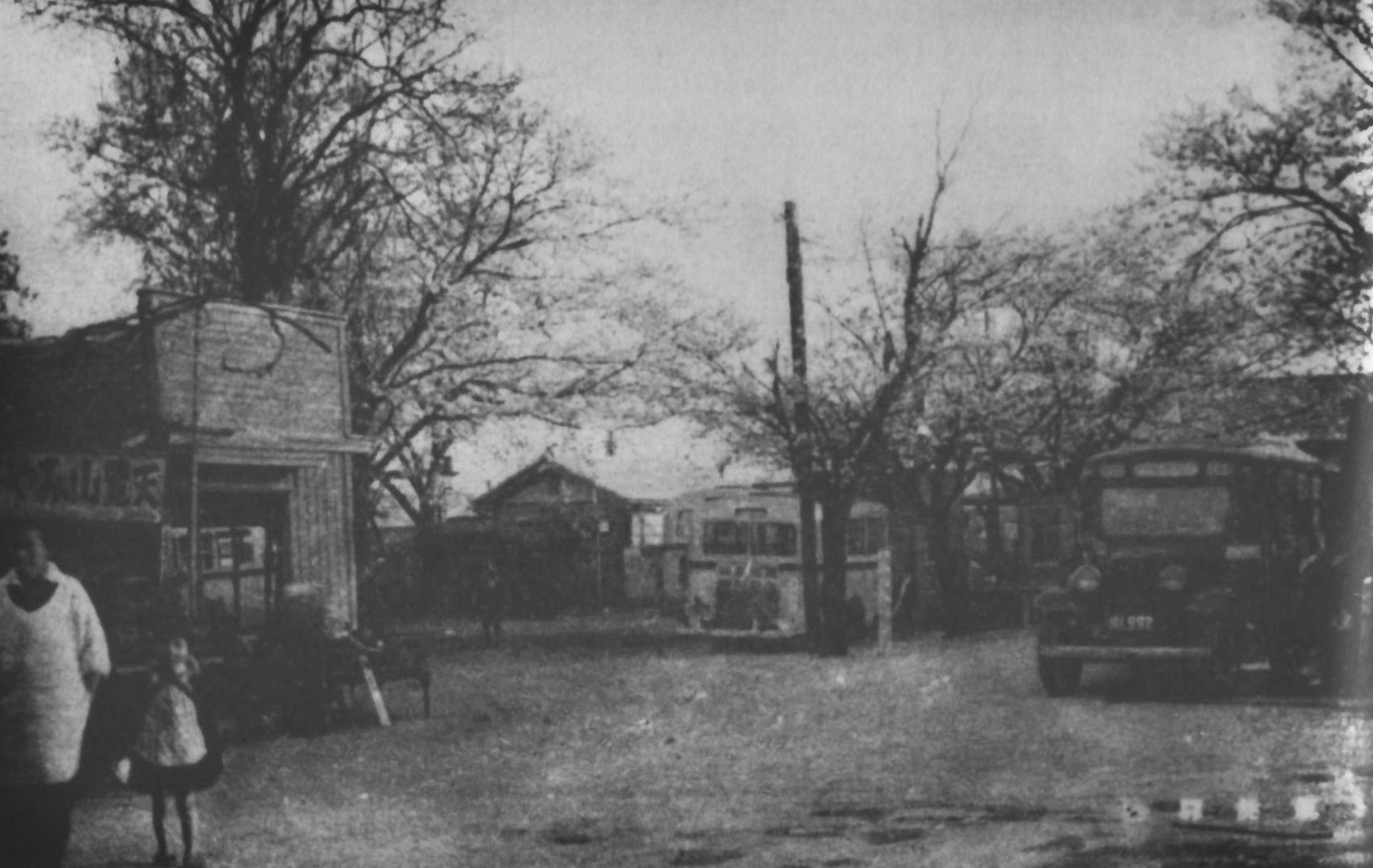
The station forecourt of Hanno Station circa 1935

The station opened on 15 April 1915.

Station numbering was introduced on all Seibu Railway lines during fiscal 2012, with Hannō Station becoming "SI26".

Through-running to and from Yokohama and Motomachi-Chukagai via the Tokyu Toyoko Line and Minatomirai Line commenced on 16 March 2013.

Before March 2020. Rapid Express and Express Services used to Run as Local Trains to Nagatoro / Mitsumineguchi

== Passenger statistics ==
In fiscal 2019, the station was the 30th busiest on the Seibu network with an average of 32,929 passengers daily. The passenger figures for previous years are as shown below.

Fiscal year	Daily average
2000	37,156
2009	34,106
2010	32,932
2011	32,293
2012	32,463
2013	32,897

== Surrounding area ==
=== North exit ===
- Higashi-Hannō Station
- National Route 299
- Seibou Gakuen High School & Junior High School
- Saitama Prefectural Hannō High School

=== South exit ===
- Surugadai University
- Iruma River

== See also ==
- List of railway stations in Japan
