= Japan National Route 299 =

Road in Japan

National Route 299
- 国道299号
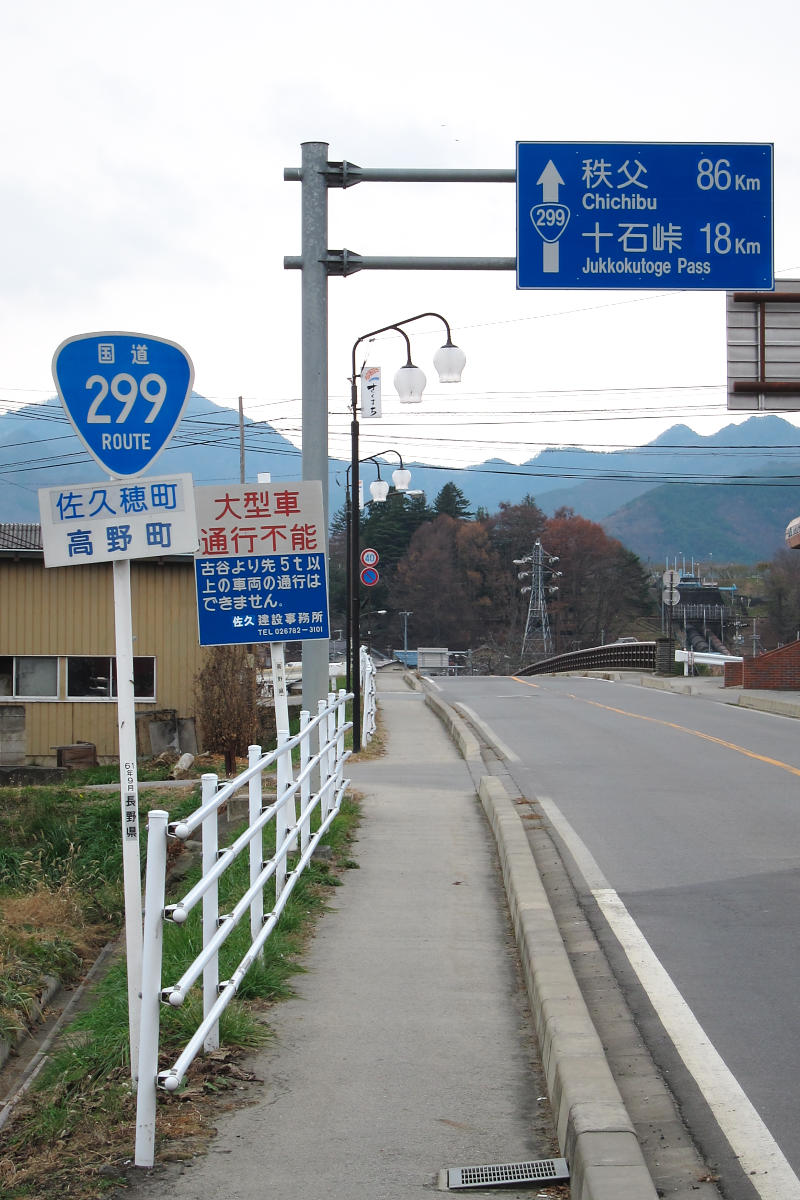

Route information
- Length: 189.3 km (117.6 mi)

Location
- Country: Japan

Highway system
- National highways of Japan; Expressways of Japan
← National Route 298	→ National Route 300

National Route 299 is a national highway of Japan connecting Chino, Nagano and Iruma, Saitama in Japan, with a total length of 189.3 km (117.63 mi).
