= Kotesashi Station =

Railway station in Tokorozawa, Saitama Prefecture, Japan

SI19 Kotesashi Station 小手指駅
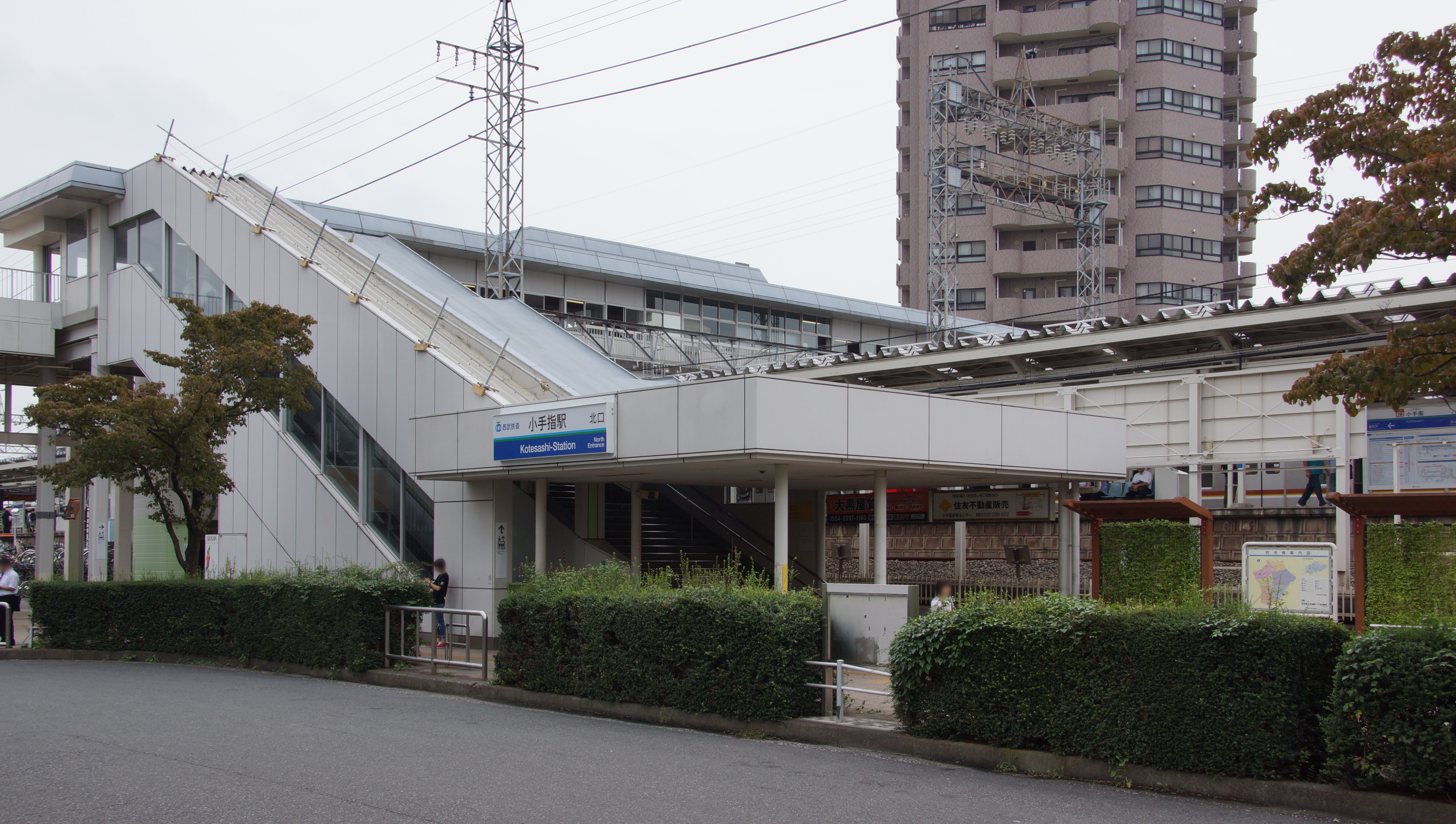
- The north entrance in September 2016

General information
- Location: 1-8-1 Kotesashi-chō, Tokorozawa-shi, Saitama-ken 359-1141; Japan
- Coordinates: 35°48′03″N 139°26′18″E
- Operator: Seibu Railway
- Line: Seibu Ikebukuro Line
- Distance: 29.4 km from Ikebukuro
- Platforms: 2 island platforms
- Tracks: 4
- Connections: Bus stop

Other information
- Station code: SI19
- Website: Official website

History
- Opened: 20 November 1970

Passengers
- FY2019: 48,781 daily

Services
Preceding station	Seibu Railway	Following station
Irumashi SI23 towards Hannō	F Liner	Tokorozawa SI17 towards Motomachi-Chūkagai
Irumashi SI23 towards Hannō	Ikebukuro Line Rapid Express	Tokorozawa SI17 towards Ikebukuro or Nerima
Sayamagaoka SI20 towards Hannō	Ikebukuro Line Express	Nishi-Tokorozawa SI18 towards Ikebukuro
Sayamagaoka One-way operation	Ikebukuro Line Commuter Express	Nishi-Tokorozawa SI18 towards Ikebukuro
Sayamagaoka SI20 towards Hannō	Ikebukuro Line Rapid	Nishi-Tokorozawa SI18 towards Ikebukuro
Terminus	Ikebukuro Line Commuter Semi Express	Nishi-Tokorozawa SI18 towards Ikebukuro
Sayamagaoka SI20 towards Hannō	Ikebukuro Line Semi Express	Nishi-Tokorozawa SI18 towards Ikebukuro
Sayamagaoka SI20 towards Agano	Ikebukuro Line Local	Nishi-Tokorozawa SI18 towards Ikebukuro
Location
- Location within Saitama Prefecture Location within Japan

Kotesashi Station (小手指駅, Kotesashi-eki) is a passenger railway station located in the city of Tokorozawa, Saitama, Japan, operated by the private railway operator Seibu Railway.

== Lines ==
Kotesashi Station is served by the Seibu Ikebukuro Line from Ikebukuro in Tokyo, with some services inter-running via the Tokyo Metro Yurakucho Line to Shin-Kiba and the Tokyo Metro Fukutoshin Line to Shibuya and onward via the Tokyu Toyoko Line and Minato Mirai Line to Motomachi-Chukagai. Located between Nishi-Tokorozawa and Sayamagaoka, it is 29.4 km from the Ikebukuro terminus. All services except Chichibu and Musashi limited express as well as the S-Train services stop at this station.

== Station layout ==
The station consists of two ground-level island platforms serving four tracks.

=== Platforms ===
1/2	Seibu Ikebukuro Line	for Tokorozawa, Nerima, and Ikebukuro; Tokyo Metro Yurakucho Line for Shin-Kiba; Tokyo Metro Fukutoshin Line for Shibuya; Tokyu Toyoko Line for Yokohama; Minatomirai Line for Motomachi-Chukagai
3/4	Seibu Ikebukuro Line	for Hannō and Seibu-Chichibu

=== Facilities and accessibility ===
Toilet facilities are located on the elevated concourse, inside the ticket barriers. Escalator and lift access is provided to and from both sets of platforms.

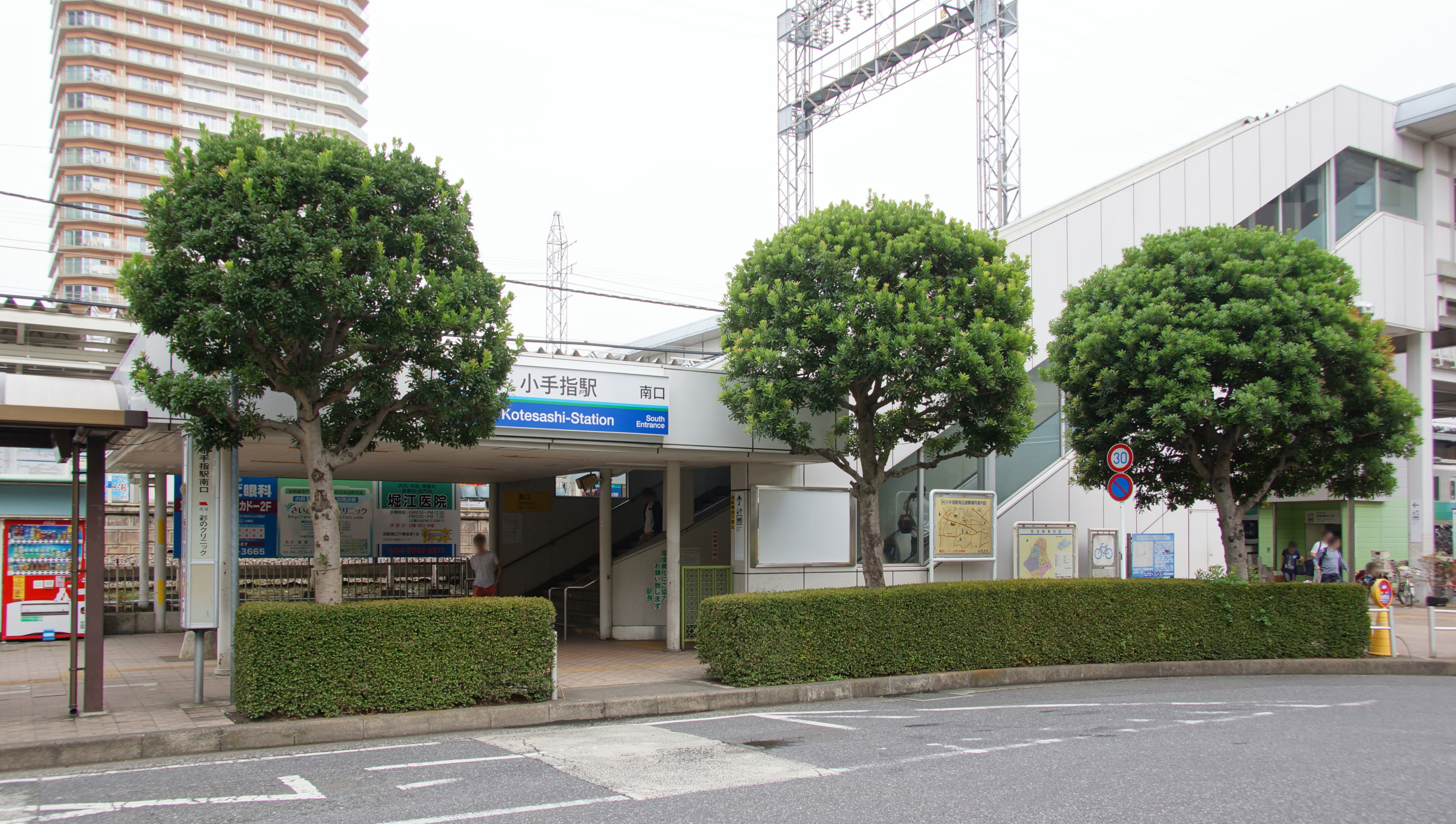
The south entrance in September 2016

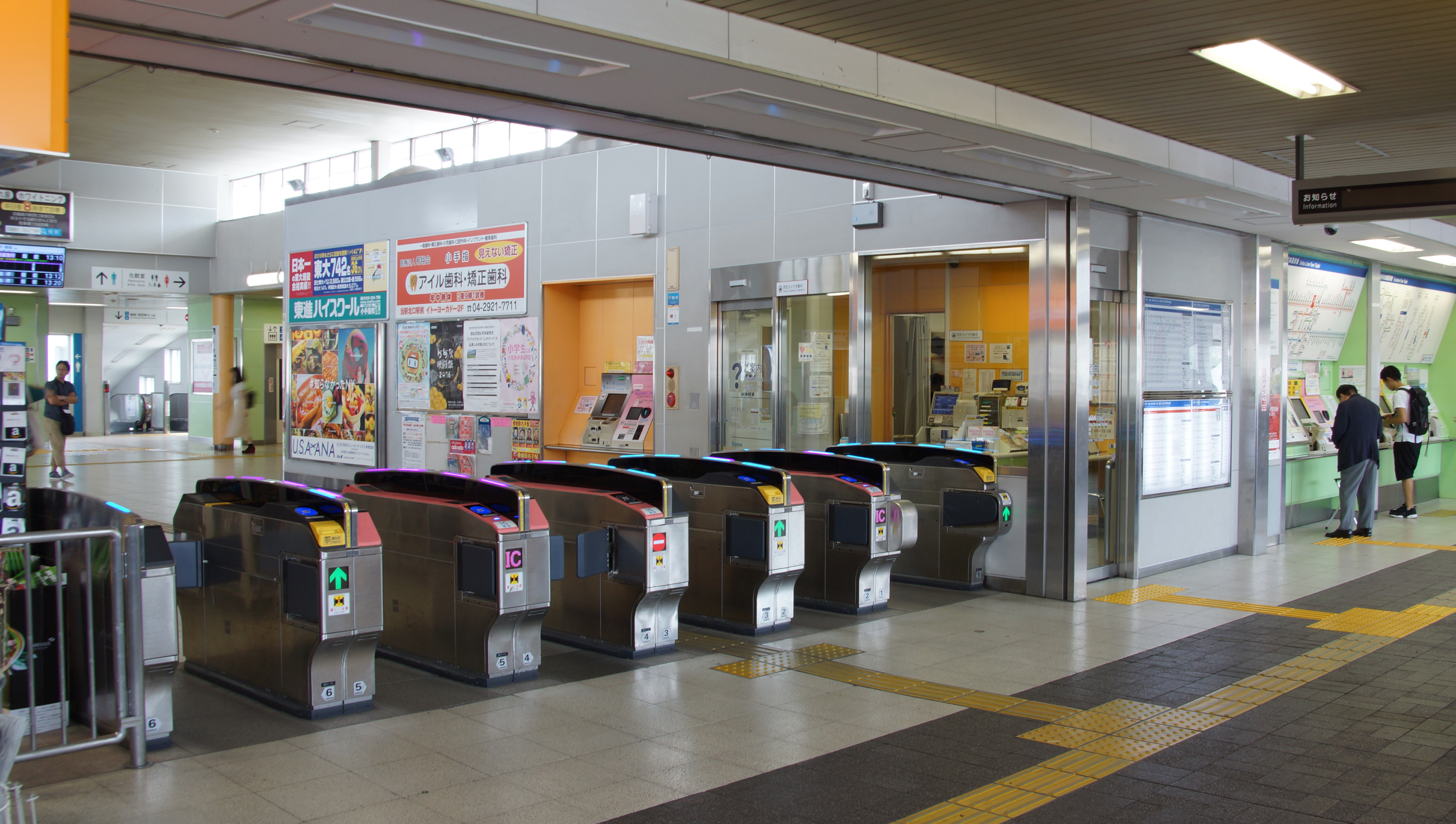
The ticket barriers in September 2016

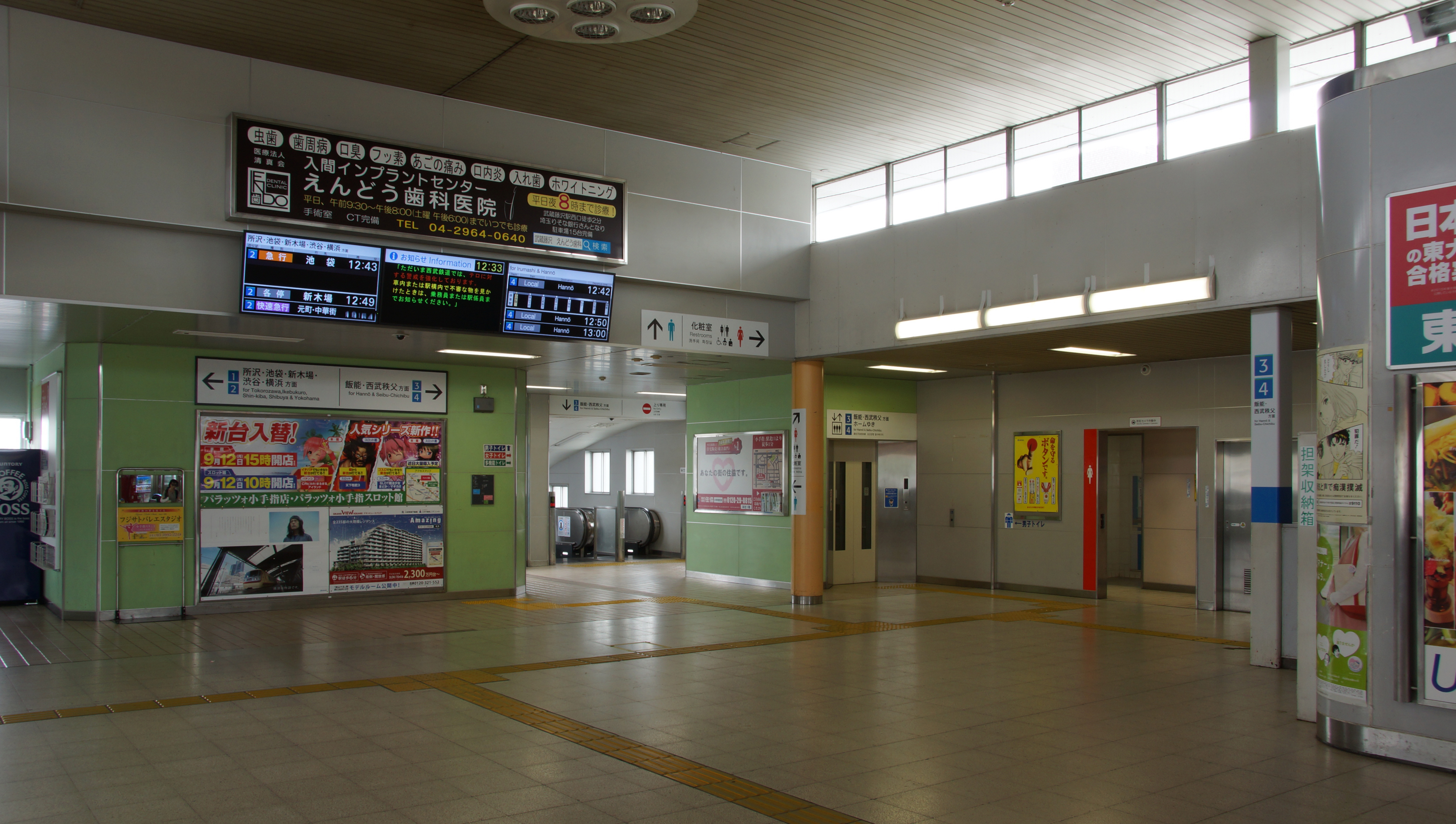
The concourse and station toilets inside the ticket barriers in September 2016

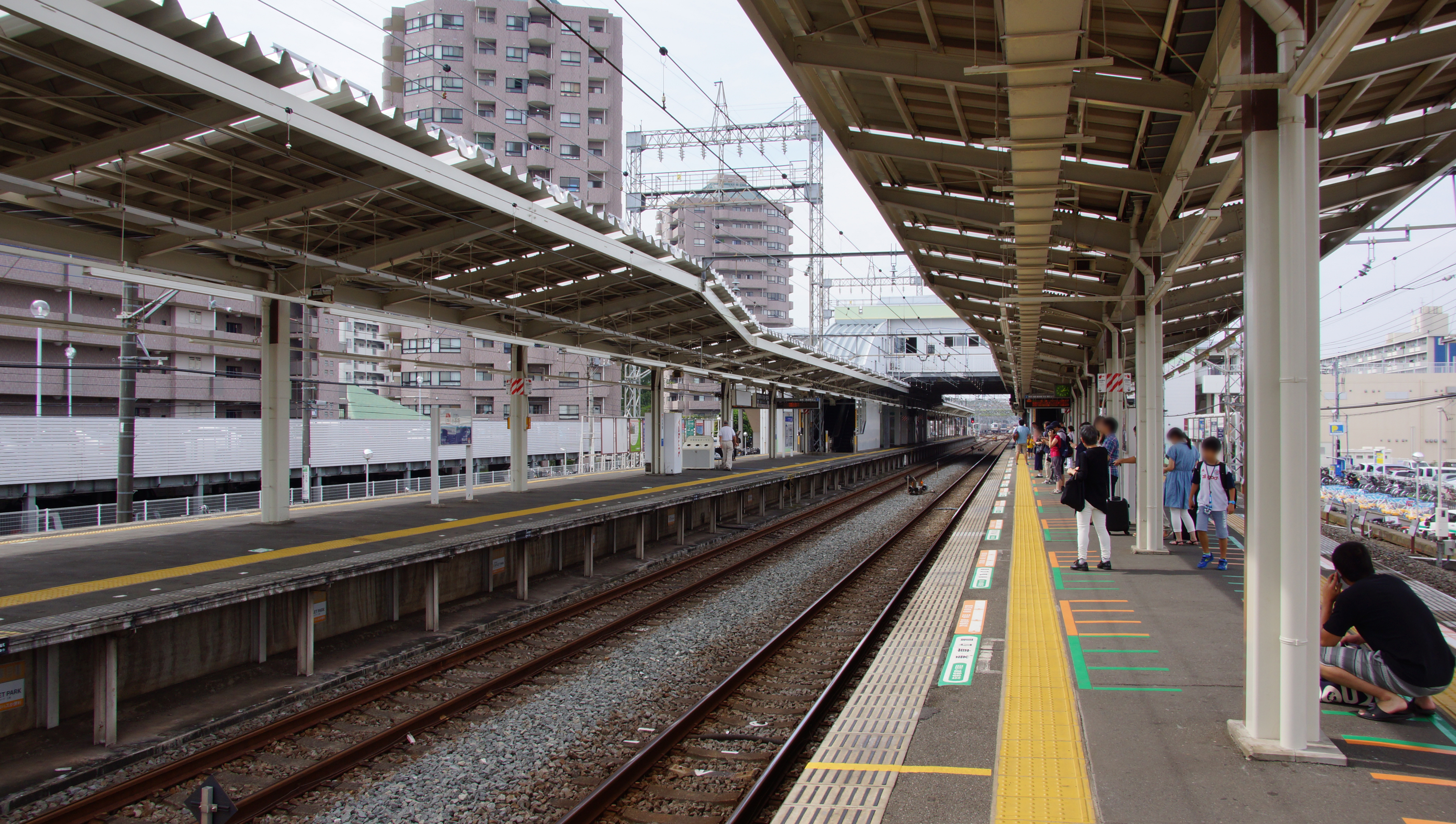
The up end of the platforms in September 2016

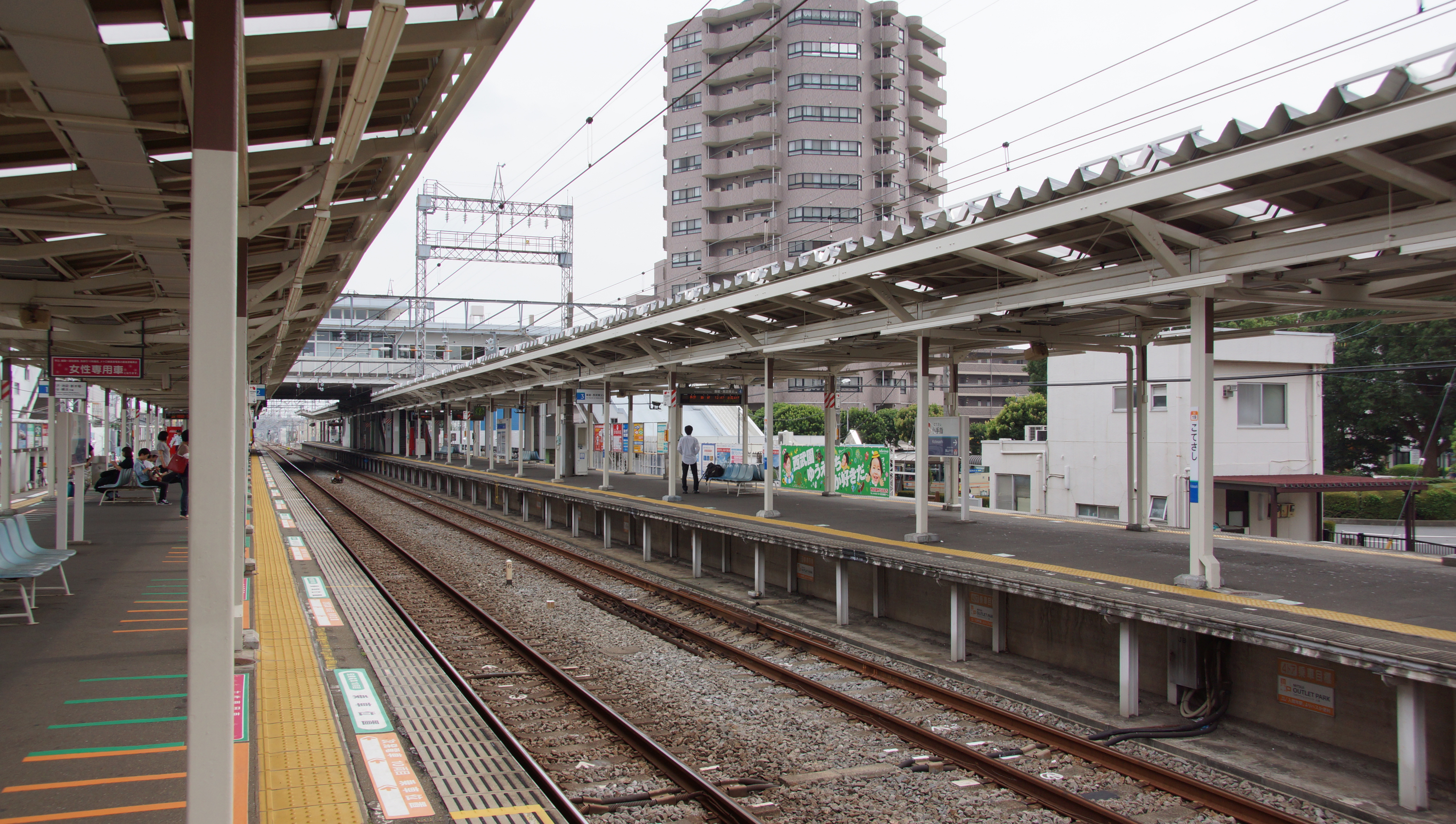
The down end of the platforms in September 2016

== History ==
The station opened on 20 November 1970.

Station numbering was introduced on all Seibu Railway lines during fiscal 2012, with Kotesashi Station becoming "SI19".

Through-running to and from Yokohama and Motomachi-Chukagai via the Tokyu Toyoko Line and Minatomirai Line commenced on 16 March 2013.

== Passenger statistics ==
In fiscal 2019, the station was the 43rd busiest on the Seibu network with an average of 48,781 passengers daily. The passenger figures for previous years are as shown below.

Fiscal year	Daily average
2000	44,622
2010	48,668
2011	46,571
2012	47,336
2013	48,338
2014	48,058
2015	48,696

== Surrounding area ==
Seibu's Kotesashi Depot is located to the north of the tracks immediately to the west of the station.

=== South side ===
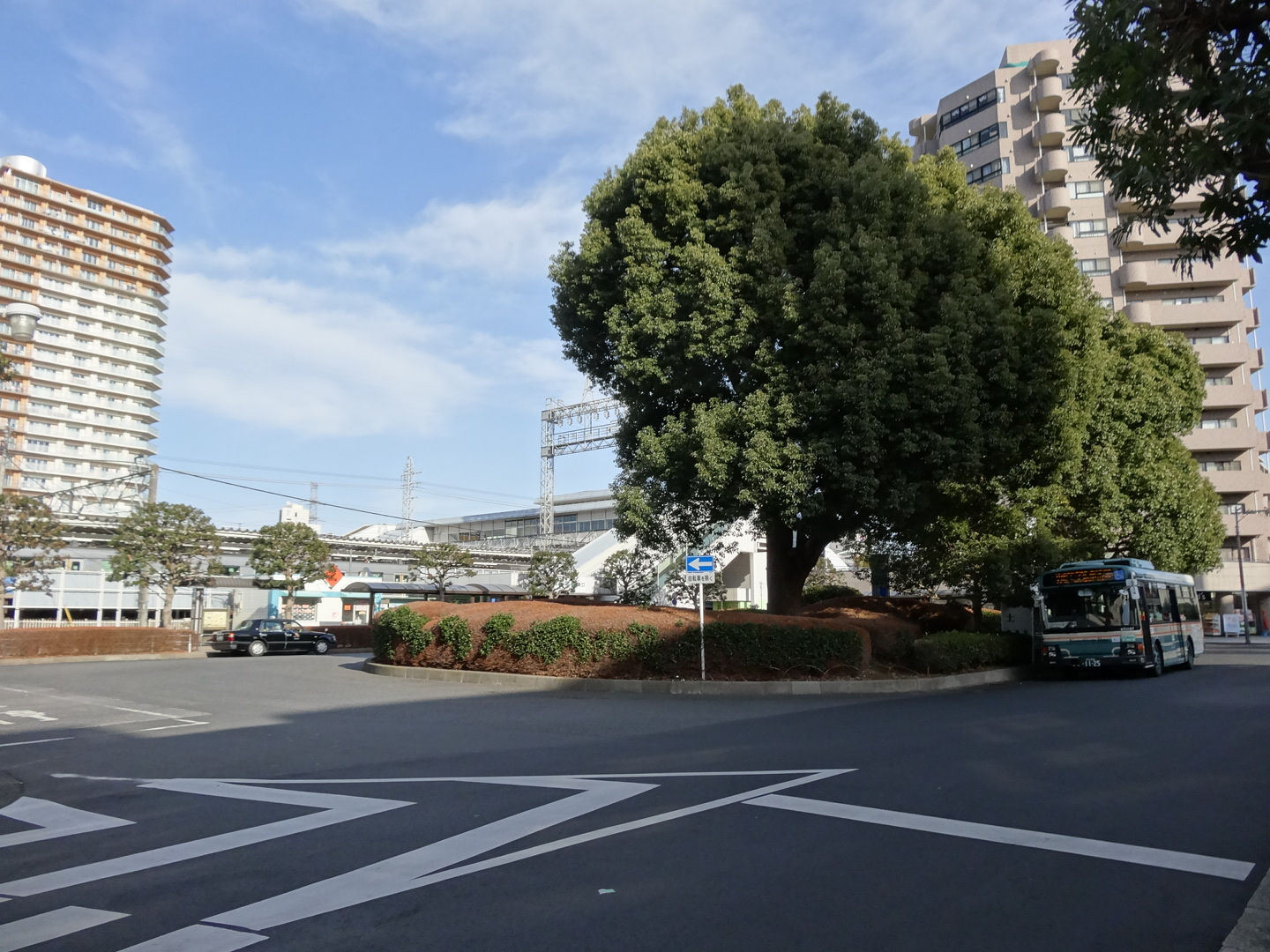
The south side of the station in February 2014

- Kitanoten Shrine
- Waseda University Tokorozawa Campus
- Saitama Prefectural Tokorozawa Nishi High School
- Saitama Prefectural High School of the Arts
- Tokorozawa Municipal Kitano Junior High School
- Tokorozawa Municipal Kotesashi Junior High School
- National Hospital Organization Nishisaitama Chuo National Hospital
- National Route 463

=== North side ===
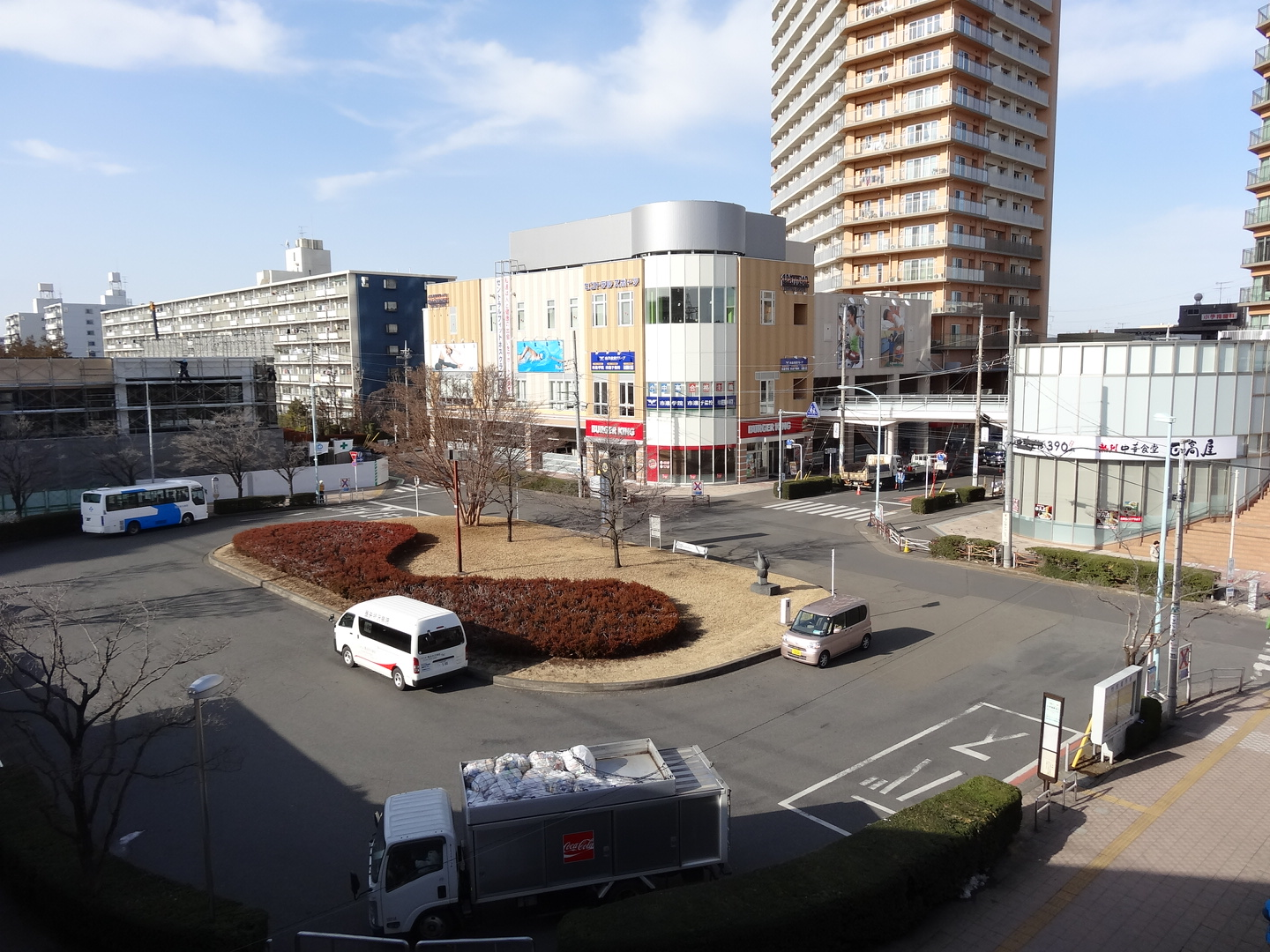
The north side of the station in February 2014

- Shin-Tokorozawa Station (Seibu Shinjuku Line)

== See also ==
- List of railway stations in Japan
