= Sayamagaoka Station =

Railway station in Tokorozawa, Saitama Prefecture, Japan

SI20 Sayamagaoka Station 狭山ヶ丘駅
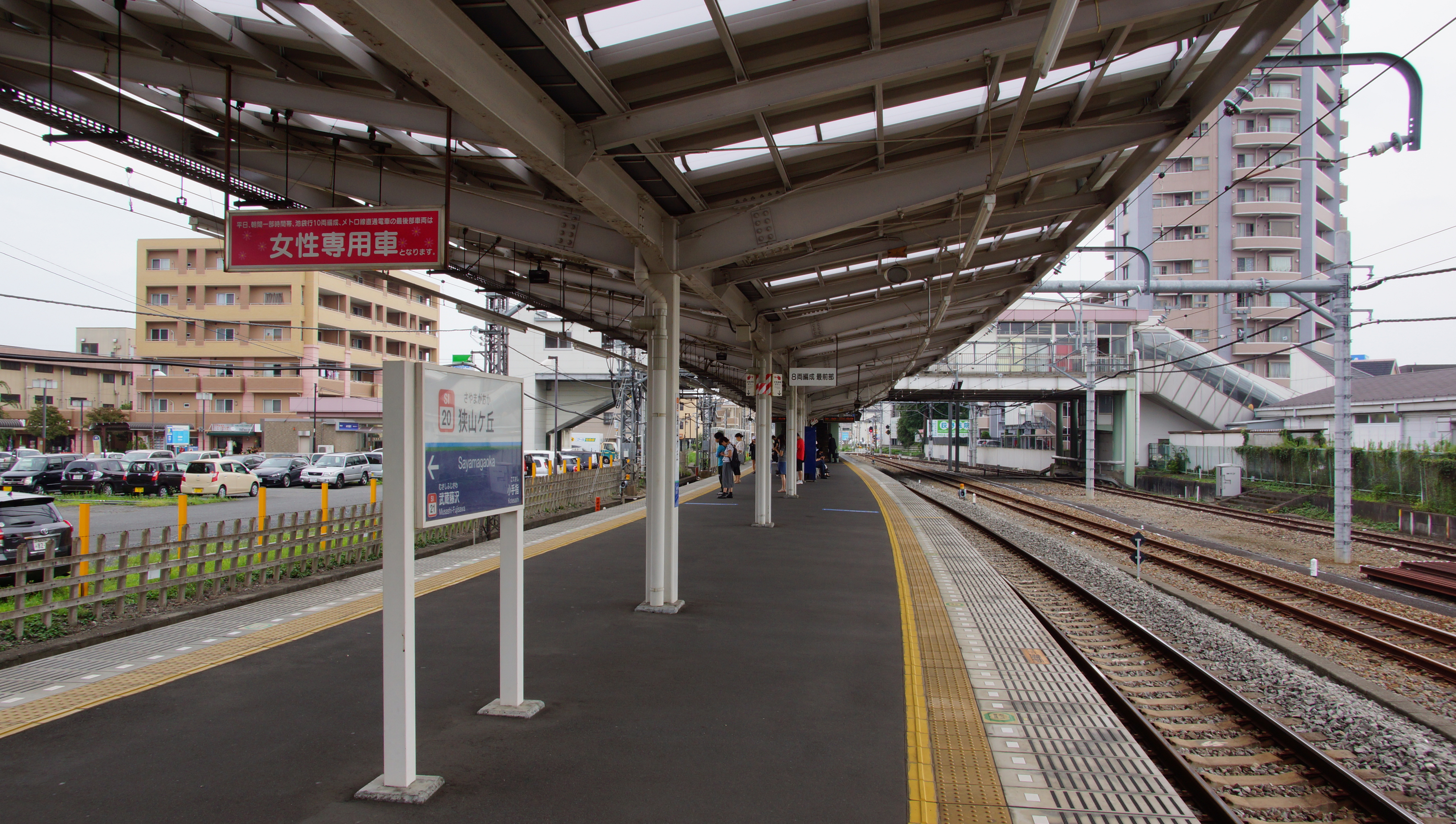
- The platforms in September 2016

General information
- Location: 1-2980 Sayamagaoka, Tokorozawa-shi, Saitama-ken 359-1161; Japan
- Coordinates: 35°48′37″N 139°25′00″E
- Operator: Seibu Railway
- Line: Seibu Ikebukuro Line
- Distance: 31.6 km from Ikebukuro
- Platforms: 1 island platform
- Tracks: 2
- Connections: Bus stop

Other information
- Station code: SI20
- Website: Official website

History
- Opened: 15 April 1915
- Former names: Moto-Sayama Station (1915); Mikajimamura Station (1915-1933)

Passengers
- FY2019: 25,107 daily

Services
Preceding station	Seibu Railway	Following station
Musashi-Fujisawa SI21 towards Hannō	Ikebukuro Line Express	Kotesashi SI19 towards Ikebukuro
Musashi-Fujisawa One-way operation	Ikebukuro Line Commuter Express	Kotesashi SI19 towards Ikebukuro
Musashi-Fujisawa SI21 towards Hannō	Ikebukuro Line Rapid Semi Express	Kotesashi SI19 towards Ikebukuro
Musashi-Fujisawa SI21 towards Agano	Ikebukuro Line Local	Kotesashi SI19 towards Ikebukuro
Location
- Location within Saitama Prefecture Location within Japan

Sayamagaoka Station (狭山ヶ丘駅, Sayamagaoka-eki) is a passenger railway station located in the city of Tokorozawa, Saitama, Japan, operated by the private railway operator Seibu Railway.

== Lines ==
Sayamagaoka Station is served by the Seibu Ikebukuro Line from Ikebukuro in Tokyo, with some services inter-running via the Tokyo Metro Yurakucho Line to Shin-Kiba and the Tokyo Metro Fukutoshin Line to Shibuya and onward via the Tokyu Toyoko Line and Minato Mirai Line to Motomachi-Chukagai. Located between Kotesashi and Musashi-Fujisawa, it is 31.6 km from the Ikebukuro terminus.

== Station layout ==
The station consists of a ground-level island platform serving two tracks. Stabling tracks lie on the down side of the station, which were formerly used by freight trains.

=== Platforms ===
1	Seibu Ikebukuro Line	for Hannō and Seibu-Chichibu
2	Seibu Ikebukuro Line	for Tokorozawa, Nerima, and Ikebukuro; Tokyo Metro Yurakucho Line for Shin-Kiba; Tokyo Metro Fukutoshin Line for Shibuya; Tokyu Toyoko Line for Yokohama; Minatomirai Line for Motomachi-Chukagai

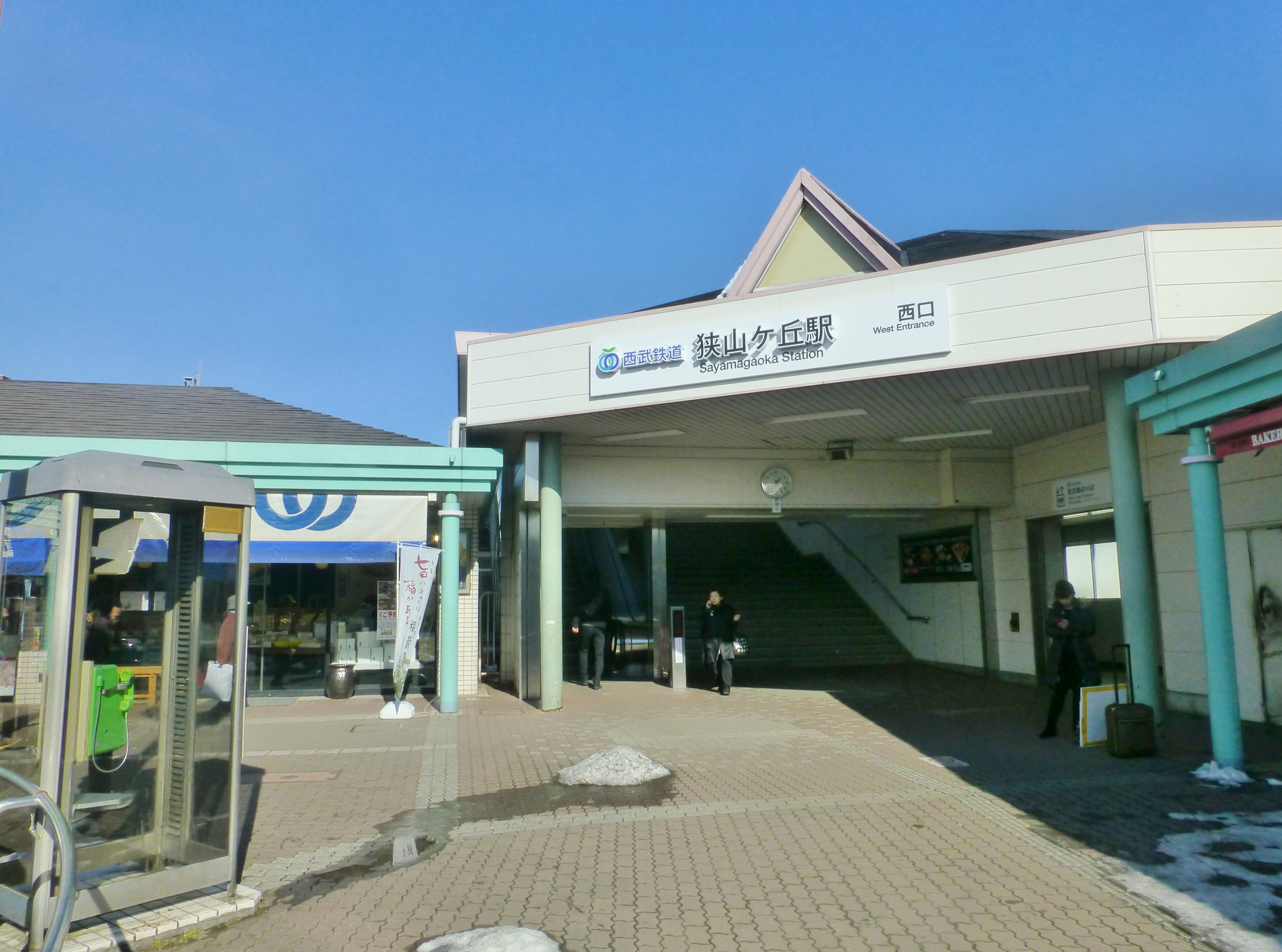
The west entrance in January 2016

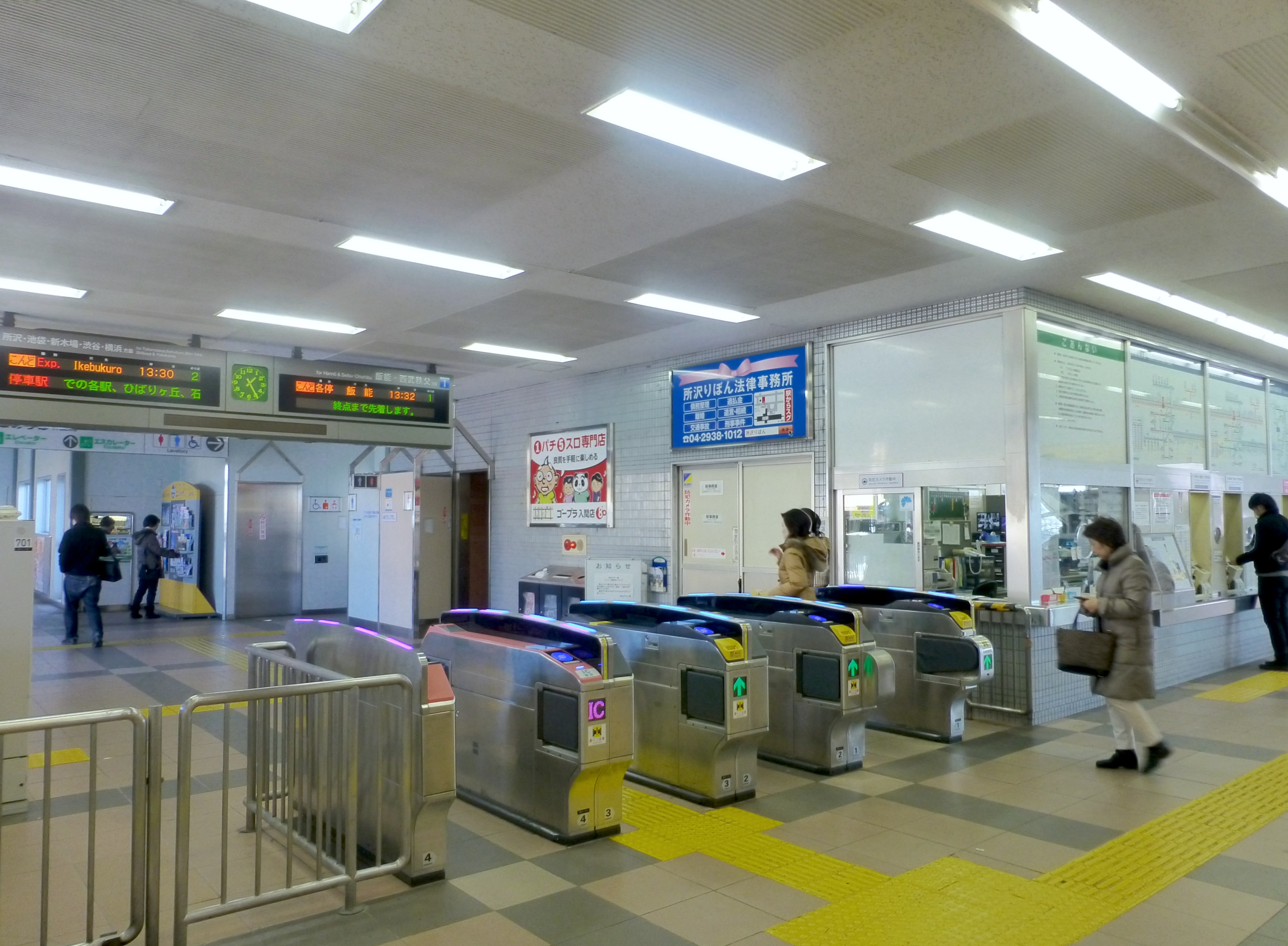
The ticket barriers in January 2016

== History ==
The station opened on 15 April 1915, initially named Moto-Sayama Station (元狭山駅). This was renamed Mikajimamura Station (三ヶ島村駅) in August of the same year. The station was renamed Sayamagaoka from 1 March 1933.

Station numbering was introduced on all Seibu Railway lines during fiscal 2012, with Sayamagaoka Station becoming "SI20".

Through-running to and from Yokohama and Motomachi-Chukagai via the Tokyu Toyoko Line and Minatomirai Line commenced on 16 March 2013.

== Passenger statistics ==
In fiscal 2019, the station was the 20th busiest on the Seibu network with an average of 25,107 passengers daily. The passenger figures for previous years are as shown below.

Fiscal year	Daily average
2000	31,703
2009	28,092
2010	26,835
2011	25,997
2012	26,023
2013	26,238
2014	25,665
2015	25,831

== Surrounding area ==
- National Route 463

== See also ==
- List of railway stations in Japan
