= Musashi-Fujisawa Station =

Railway station in Iruma, Saitama Prefecture, Japan

SI21 Musashi-Fujisawa Station 武蔵藤沢駅
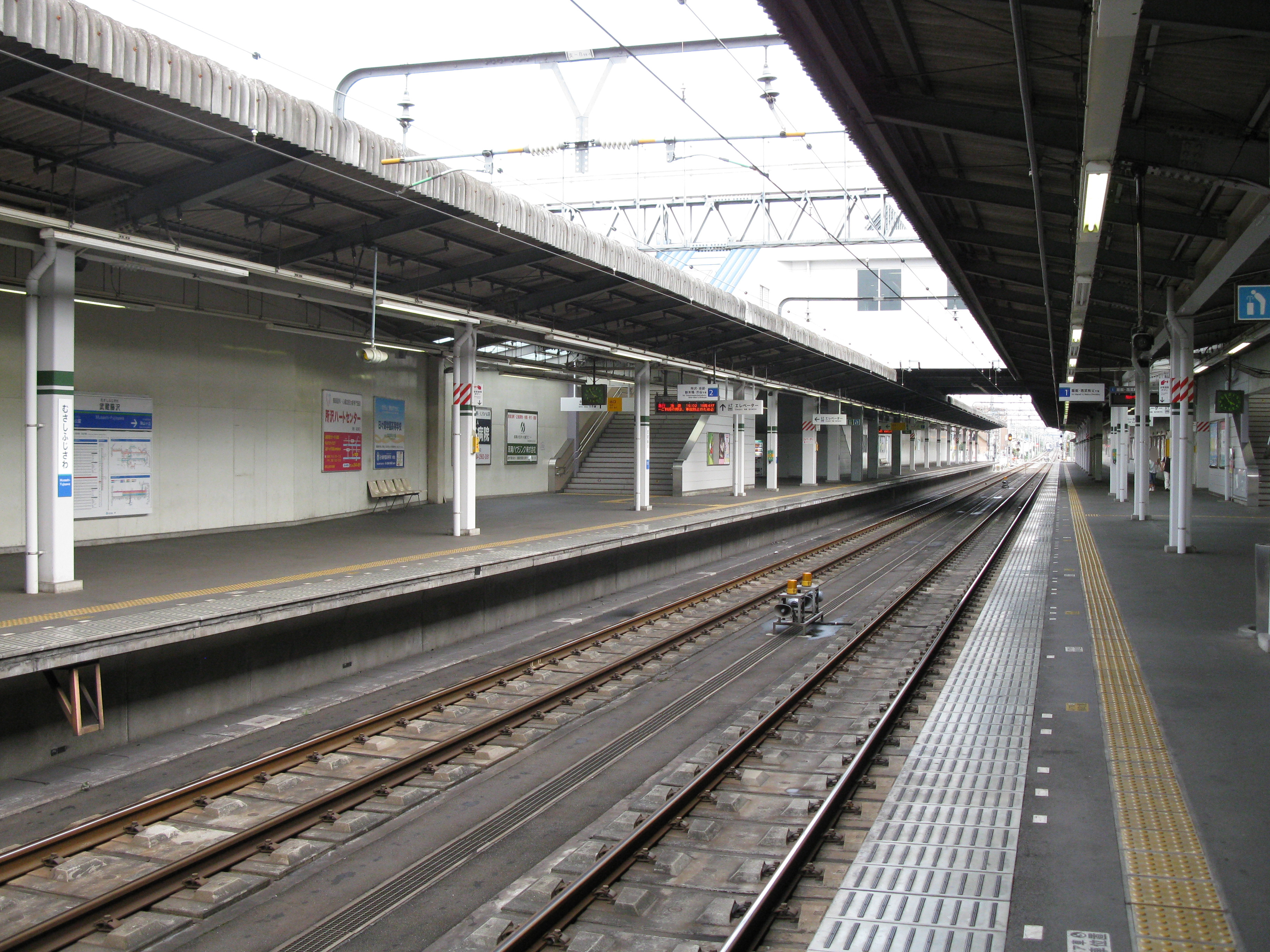
- Musashi-Fujisawa Station platform (Seibu Railway Ikebukuro Line)

General information
- Location: 494-4 Shimofujisawa, Iruma-shi, Saitama-ken 358-0011; Japan
- Coordinates: 35°49′16″N 139°24′46″E
- Operator: Seibu Railway
- Line: Seibu Ikebukuro Line
- Distance: 32.9 km from Ikebukuro
- Platforms: 2 side platforms
- Connections: Bus stop

Construction
- Structure type: At-grade
- Accessible: Yes

Other information
- Station code: SI21
- Website: Official website

History
- Opened: 1 April 1926

Passengers
- FY2019: 24,182 (Daily)

Services
Preceding station	Seibu Railway	Following station
Inariyama-kōen SI22 towards Hannō	Ikebukuro Line Express	Sayamagaoka SI20 towards Ikebukuro
Inariyama-kōen One-way operation	Ikebukuro Line Commuter Express	Sayamagaoka SI20 towards Ikebukuro
Inariyama-kōen SI22 towards Hannō	Ikebukuro Line Rapid Semi Express	Sayamagaoka SI20 towards Ikebukuro
Inariyama-kōen SI22 towards Agano	Ikebukuro Line Local	Sayamagaoka SI20 towards Ikebukuro
Location
- Location within Saitama Prefecture Location within Japan

Musashi-Fujisawa Station (武蔵藤沢駅, Musashi-Fujisawa-eki) is a passenger railway station located in the city of Iruma, Saitama, Japan, operated by the private railway operator Seibu Railway.

== Lines ==
Musashi-Fujisawa Station is served by the Seibu Ikebukuro Line from Ikebukuro in Tokyo, with some services inter-running via the Tokyo Metro Yurakucho Line to Shin-Kiba and the Tokyo Metro Fukutoshin Line to Shibuya and onward via the Tokyu Toyoko Line and Minato Mirai Line to Motomachi-Chukagai. Located between Sayamagaoka and Inariyama-kōen, it is 32.9 km from the Ikebukuro terminus.

== Station layout ==
The station consists of two ground-level side platforms serving two tracks, with an elevated station building.

=== Platforms ===
1	Seibu Ikebukuro Line	for Hannō and Seibu-Chichibu
2	Seibu Ikebukuro Line	for Tokorozawa, Nerima, and Ikebukuro; Tokyo Metro Yurakucho Line for Shin-Kiba; Tokyo Metro Fukutoshin Line for Shibuya; Tōkyū Tōyoko Line for Yokohama; Minatomirai Line for Motomachi-Chukagai

== History ==
The station opened on 1 April 1926.

Station numbering was introduced on all Seibu Railway lines during fiscal 2012, with Musashi-Fujisawa Station becoming "SI21".

Through-running to and from Yokohama and Motomachi-Chukagai via the Tokyu Toyoko Line and Minatomirai Line commenced on 16 March 2013.

== Passenger statistics ==
In fiscal 2019, the station was the 47th busiest on the Seibu network with an average of 24,182 passengers daily. The passenger figures for previous years are as shown below.

The passenger figures for previous years are as shown below.

Fiscal year	Daily average
2000	21,957
2009	23,054
2010	22,690
2015	24,190

== Surrounding area ==
- Sayamagaoka Senior High School
- National Route 463

== See also ==
- List of railway stations in Japan
