= Shiinamachi Station =

Railway station in Tokyo, Japan

Coordinates: 35°43′35″N 139°41′40″E

SI02 Shiinamachi Station 椎名町駅
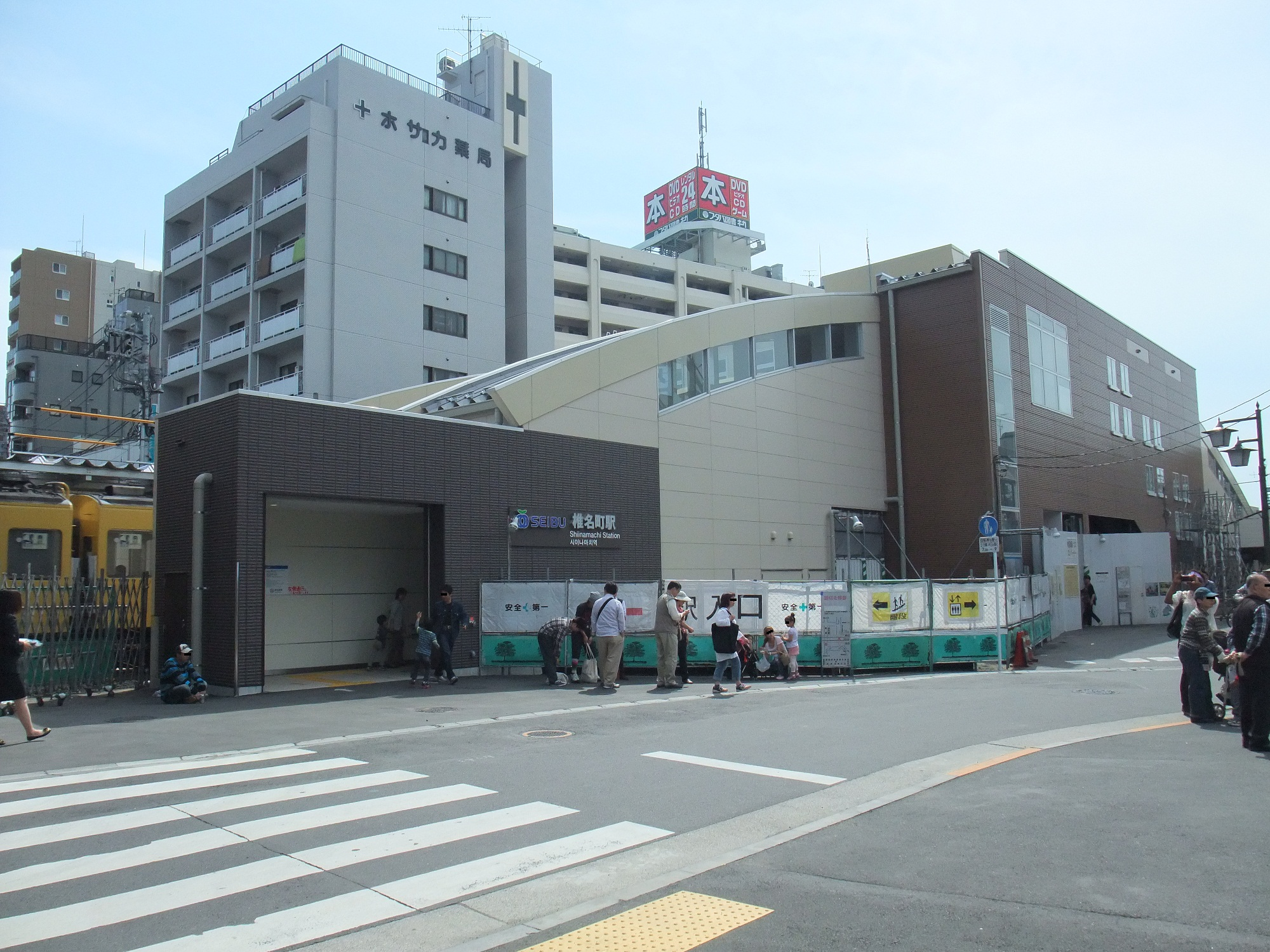
- North entrance, May 2012

General information
- Location: 1-1-22 Nagasaki, Toshima, Tokyo （東京都豊島区長崎1-1-22） Japan
- Operator: Seibu Railway
- Line: Seibu Ikebukuro Line

Other information
- Station code: SI02

History
- Opened: 11 June 1924

Passengers
- FY2013: 18,664 daily

Services
Preceding station	Seibu Railway	Following station
Higashi-Nagasaki SI03 towards Agano	Ikebukuro Line Local	Ikebukuro SI01 Terminus
Location

Shiinamachi Station (椎名町駅, Shiinamachi-eki) is a railway station on the Seibu Ikebukuro Line in Toshima, Tokyo, Japan, operated by the private railway operator Seibu Railway.

== Lines ==
Shiinamachi Station is served by the Seibu Ikebukuro Line from Ikebukuro in Tokyo to Hannō in Saitama Prefecture, and is located 1.9 km from the Ikebukuro terminus. Only all-stations "Local" services stop at this station.

== Station layout ==
The station has two ground-level side platforms serving two tracks.

=== Platforms ===
1	Seibu Ikebukuro Line	for Ikebukuro
2	Seibu Ikebukuro Line	for Tokorozawa and Hannō

== History ==
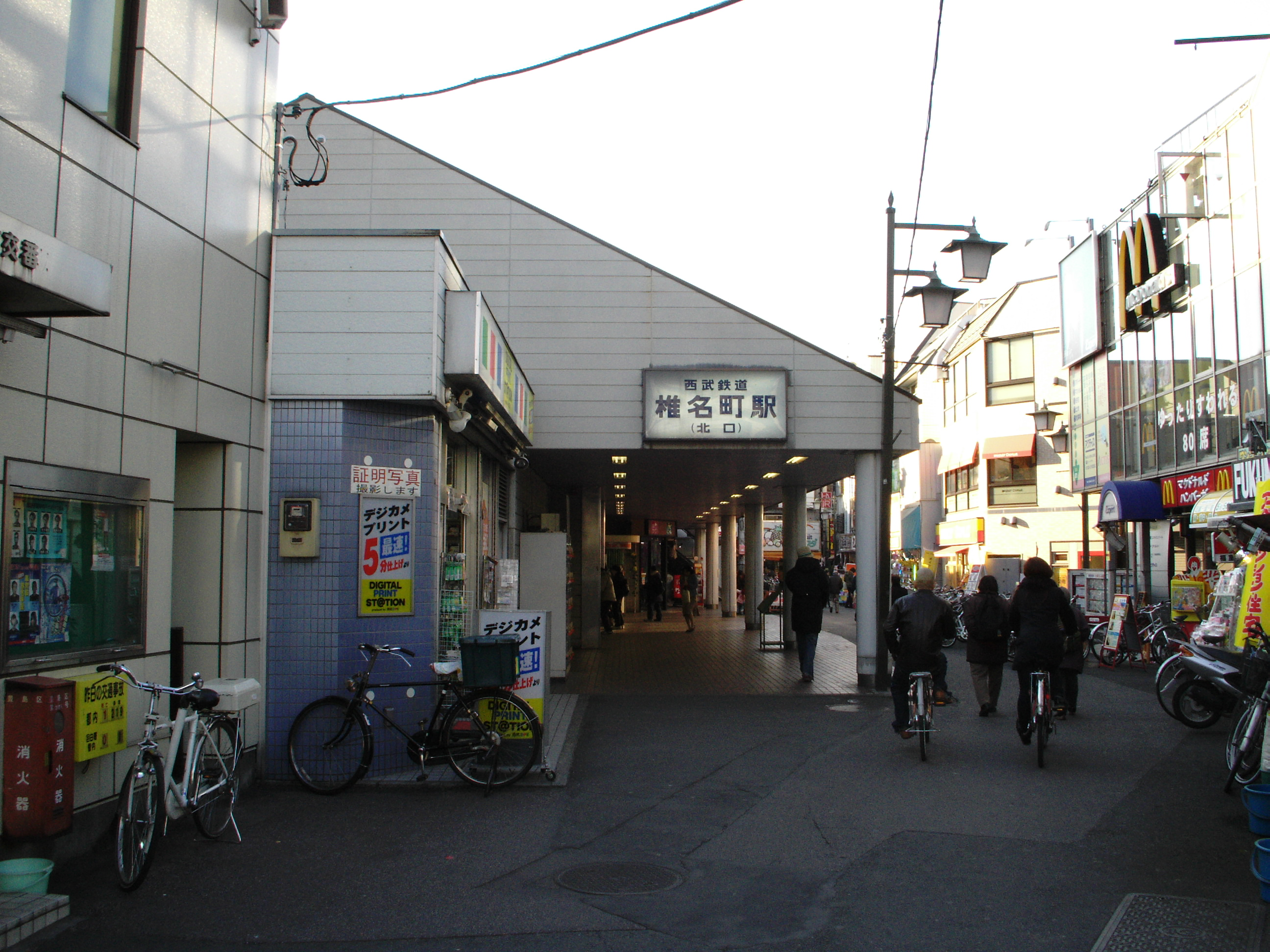
North side of station before rebuilding, February 2007

Shiinamachi Station opened on 11 June 1924. The name was taken from the original name of the district in which the station was located, although it is now named Nagasaki.

Station numbering was introduced during fiscal 2012, with Shiinamachi Station becoming "SI02".

== Passenger statistics ==
In fiscal 2013, the station was the 55th busiest on the Seibu network with an average of 18,664 passengers daily.

The passenger figures for previous years are as shown below.

Fiscal year	Daily average
2000	21,476
2009	18,633
2010	17,937
2011	17,638
2012	18,027
2013	18,664

In the 2015 data available from Japan’s Ministry of Land, Infrastructure, Transport and Tourism, Shiinamachi → Ikebukuro was one of the train segments among Tokyo's most crowded train lines during rush hour.
