= Inariyama-kōen Station =

Railway station in Sayama, Saitama Prefecture, Japan

SI22 Inariyama-kōen Station 稲荷山公園駅
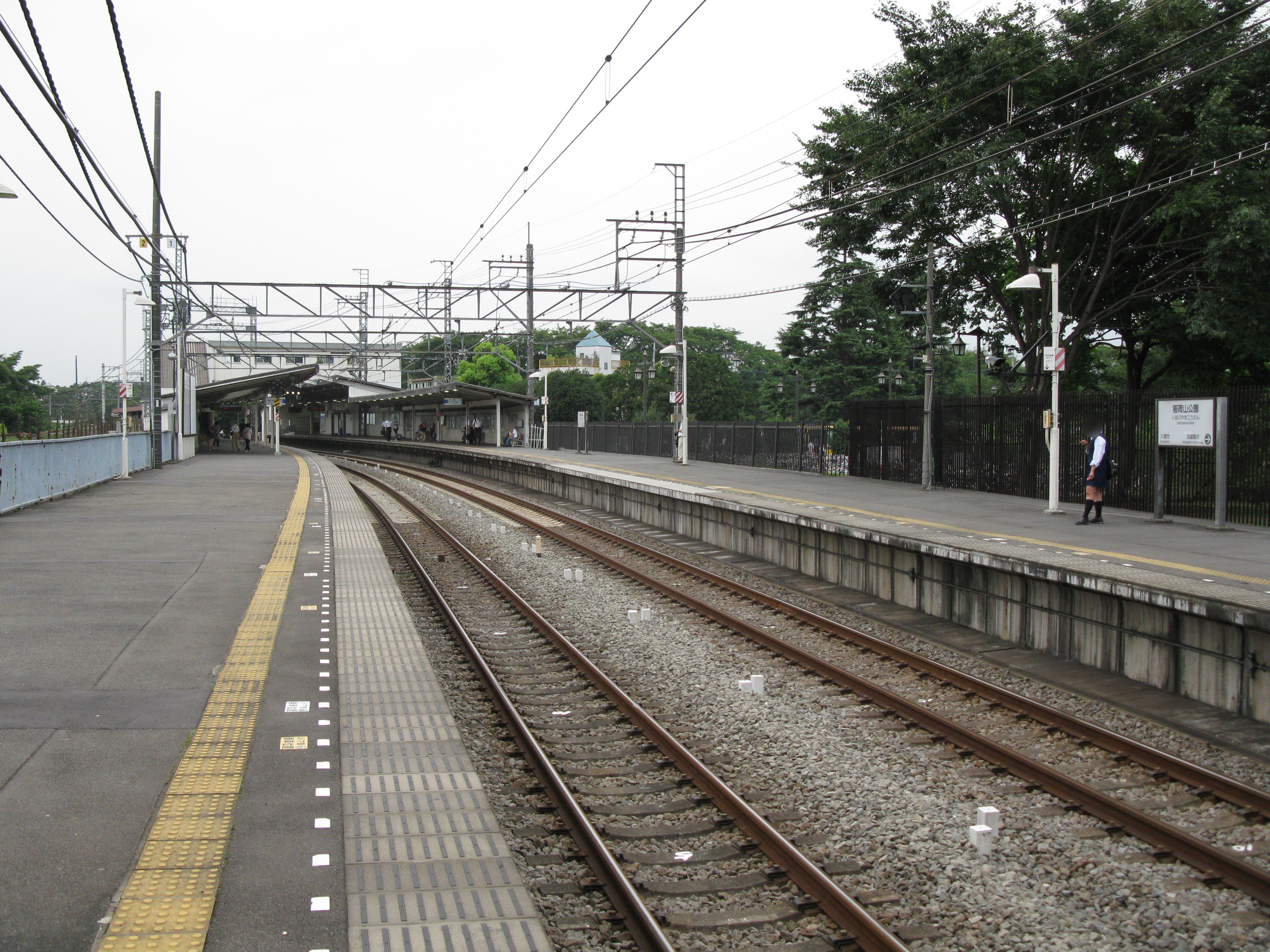
- Inariyama-kōen Station platform (Seibu Railway Ikebukuro Line)

General information
- Location: 1-1 Inariyama, Sayama-shi, Saitama-ken 350-1305; Japan
- Coordinates: 35°50′42″N 139°23′54″E
- Operator: Seibu Railway
- Line: Seibu Ikebukuro Line
- Distance: 35.9 km from Ikebukuro
- Platforms: 2 side platforms
- Connections: Bus stop

Other information
- Station code: SI22
- Website: Official website

History
- Opened: 1 April 1933

Passengers
- FY2019: 10,053 (Daily)

Services
Preceding station	Seibu Railway	Following station
Irumashi SI23 towards Hannō	Ikebukuro Line Express	Musashi-Fujisawa SI21 towards Ikebukuro
Irumashi One-way operation	Ikebukuro Line Commuter Express	Musashi-Fujisawa SI21 towards Ikebukuro
Irumashi SI23 towards Hannō	Ikebukuro Line Rapid Semi Express	Musashi-Fujisawa SI21 towards Ikebukuro
Irumashi SI23 towards Agano	Ikebukuro Line Local	Musashi-Fujisawa SI21 towards Ikebukuro
Location
- Location within Saitama Prefecture Location within Japan

Inariyama-kōen Station (稲荷山公園駅, Inariyama-kōen-eki) is a passenger railway station located in the city of Sayama, Saitama, Japan, operated by the private railway operator Seibu Railway.

== Lines ==
Inariyama-kōen Station is served by the Seibu Ikebukuro Line from Ikebukuro in Tokyo, with some services inter-running via the Tokyo Metro Yurakucho Line to Shin-Kiba and the Tokyo Metro Fukutoshin Line to Shibuya and onward via the Tokyu Toyoko Line and Minato Mirai Line to Motomachi-Chukagai. Located between Musashi-Fujisawa and Irumashi, it is 35.9 km from the Ikebukuro terminus.

== Station layout ==
The station consists of two ground-level side platforms serving two tracks, connected to the station building by a footbridge.

=== Platforms ===
1	Seibu Ikebukuro Line	for Tokorozawa, Nerima, and Ikebukuro; Tokyo Metro Yurakucho Line for Shin-Kiba; Tokyo Metro Fukutoshin Line for Shibuya; Tōkyū Tōyoko Line for Yokohama; Minatomirai Line for Motomachi-Chukagai
2	Seibu Ikebukuro Line	for Hannō and Seibu-Chichibu

== History ==
The station opened on 1 April 1933.

Station numbering was introduced on all Seibu Railway lines during fiscal 2012, with Inariyama-kōen Station becoming "SI22".

Through-running to and from Yokohama and Motomachi-Chukagai via the Tokyu Toyoko Line and Minatomirai Line commenced on 16 March 2013.

== Passenger statistics ==
In fiscal 2019, the station was the 69th busiest on the Seibu network with an average of 10,053 passengers daily.

The passenger figures for previous years are as shown below.

Fiscal year	Daily average
2000	10,833
2005	11,429
2010	8,457
2015	9,503

== Surrounding area ==
=== North exit ===
- Iruma Air Base
- Sayama Inariyama Park
- Sayama Hospital

=== South exit ===
- Tokyo Kasei University Sayama Campus
- Sainomori Iruma Park
- Sayama Keizai High School
- Iruma Koyo High School
