= Higashi-Nagasaki Station =

Railway station in Tokyo, Japan

Coordinates: 35°43′48″N 139°40′59″E

SI03 Higashi-Nagasaki Station 東長崎駅
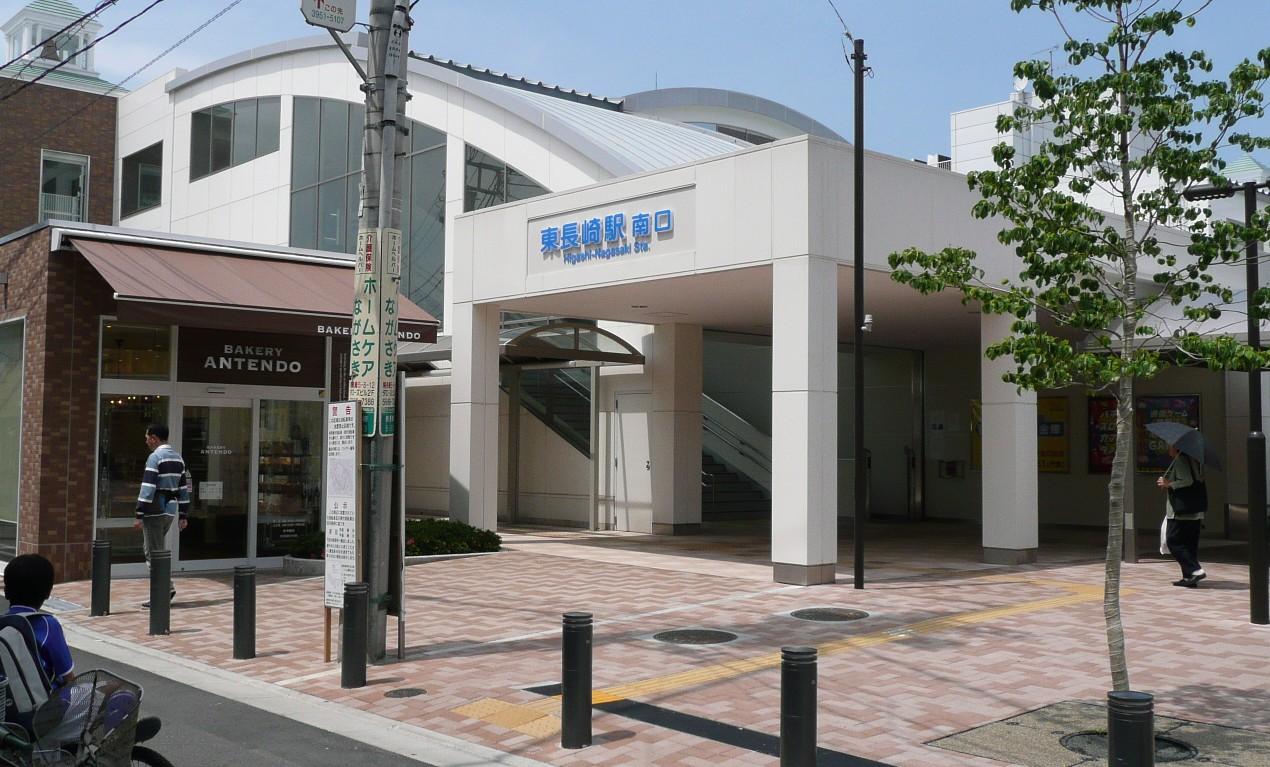
- South entrance, July 2008

General information
- Location: 5-1-1 Nagasaki, Toshima, Tokyo （東京都豊島区長崎5-1-1） Japan
- Operator: Seibu Railway
- Line: Seibu Ikebukuro Line

Other information
- Station code: SI03

History
- Opened: 15 April 1915

Passengers
- FY2013: 27,072 daily

Services
Preceding station	Seibu Railway	Following station
Ekoda SI04 towards Agano	Ikebukuro Line Local	Shiinamachi SI02 towards Ikebukuro
Location

Higashi-Nagasaki Station (東長崎駅, Higashi-Nagasaki-eki) is a railway station on the Seibu Ikebukuro Line in Toshima, Tokyo, Japan, operated by the private railway operator Seibu Railway.

== Lines ==
Higashi-Nagasaki Station is served by the Seibu Ikebukuro Line from Ikebukuro in Tokyo to Hannō in Saitama Prefecture, and is located 3.1 km from the Ikebukuro terminus. Only all-stations "Local" services stop at this station.

== Station layout ==
The station has two ground-level island platforms serving four tracks. The platforms are capable of handling 10-car trains.

=== Platforms ===
1/2	Seibu Ikebukuro Line	for Tokorozawa and Hannō
3/4	Seibu Ikebukuro Line	for Ikebukuro

== History ==
Higashi-Nagasaki Station opened on 15 April 1915. While the name of the district in which the station is located is actually Nagasaki, the station was named Higashi-Nagasaki to avoid confusion with Nagasaki Station in Kyushu.

Station numbering was introduced during fiscal 2012, with Higashi-Nagasaki Station becoming "SI03".

== Passenger statistics ==
In fiscal 2013, the station was the 37th busiest on the Seibu network with an average of 27,072 passengers daily.

The passenger figures for previous years are as shown below.

Fiscal year	Daily average
2000	32,376
2009	27,593
2010	26,464
2011	26,109
2012	26,598
2013	27,072

== Surrounding area ==
- Ochiai-minami-nagasaki Station (Toei Oedo Line)
