= Seibu Ikebukuro Line =

Railway line in Japan

Ikebukuro Line

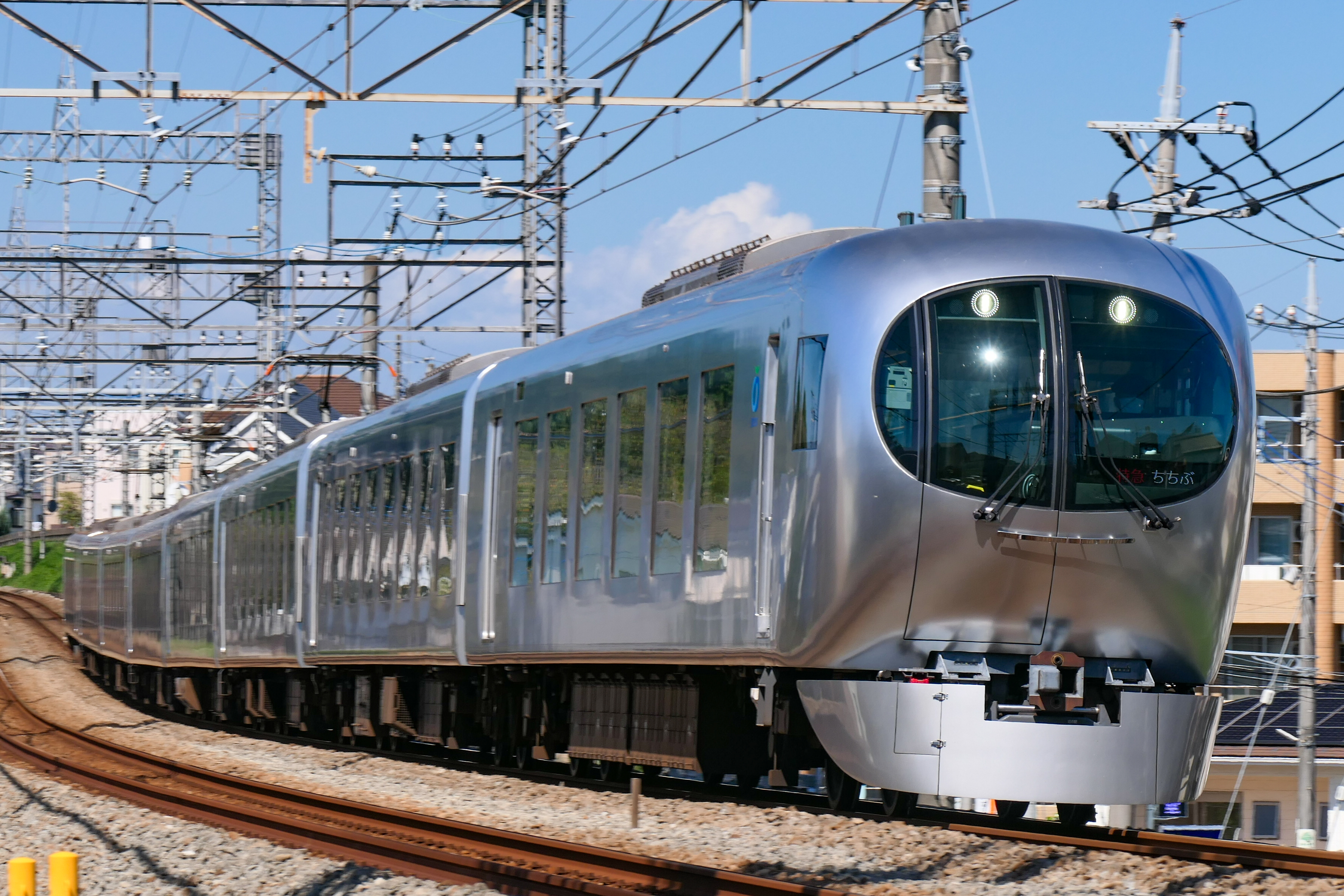
- Seibu 001 series near Nishi-Tokorozawa Station, October 2021

Overview
- Native name: 池袋線
- Status: In service
- Owner: Seibu Railway Co., Ltd.
- Locale: Kanto region
- Termini: Ikebukuro; Agano
- Stations: 31

Service
- Type: Commuter rail
- System: Seibu Railway
- Route number: SI
- Operator(s): Seibu Railway Co., Ltd.
- Depot: Kotesashi
- Daily ridership: 892,025 (2010)

History
- Opened: 15 April 1915; 111 years ago

Technical
- Line length: 57.8 km (35.9 mi)
- Track gauge: 1,067 mm (3 ft 6 in)
- Minimum radius: 200 m (660 ft)
- Electrification: 1,500 V DC, overhead catenary
- Operating speed: 105 km/h (65 mph)

The Ikebukuro Line (池袋線, Ikebukuro-sen) is a railway line of the Japanese private railway operator Seibu Railway. It originates at Ikebukuro Station, a large railway junction in north-western Tokyo, extending to northwest suburbs as far as Tokorozawa, Saitama, and nominally terminates at Agano Station.

The Seibu Chichibu Line from Agano to Seibu-Chichibu Station is an extension of the main Ikebukuro Line. The operation is largely divided into two sections: from Ikebukuro to Hannō Station and from Hannō to Seibu-Chichibu Station.

On the Seibu Chichibu Line, the section from Hannō to Seibu-Chichibu is single track, but every station except for Higashi-Hanno has passing loops, and trains may pass each other at any stop. There is also a passing loop inside a tunnel where the signal controls bi-directional operation. The rest of all the lines is double track with 1,067 mm (3 ft 6 in) track gauge.

== Branch lines ==
The Ikebukuro Line has three branches with through operation, apart from the Seibu Chichibu Line.

Toshima Line
1.0 km (0.62 mi) length, with Local trains through from Ikebukuro.
Seibu Yūrakuchō Line
The bypass to Tokyo Metro Yūrakuchō Line/Tokyo Metro Fukutoshin Line, with Semi Expresses and Rapids from Hannō to Shin-Kiba Station/Motomachi-Chukagai Station, with Locals. The F Liner express service also runs through with limited stops.
Seibu Sayama Line
Through trains are operated daily during off-peak hours. Special Limited Express "Dome" services are occasionally operated for baseball games of the Saitama Seibu Lions.

== Line data ==
Tracks:

- 4-track: Nerima to Shakujii-kōen (4.6 km (2.9 mi))
- 2-track: Ikebukuro to Nerima (6.0 km (3.7 mi)), Shakujii-kōen to Hannō (33.1 km (20.6 mi)), Kita-Hannō rail yard to Musashigaoka Rail yard (1.5 km (0.93 mi))
- 1-track: the remainder

== Service pattern ==
Abbreviations here are for the table below, not formally used.

Local (各停, Kakutei)
Stops at all stations. The longest operations are Ikebukuro to Hannō, through to Seibu Kyūjō-mae on Sayama Line, through to Toshimaen on Toshima Line. Also through from Tokyo Metro Yūrakuchō Line to Kotesashi and Hannō. Major sections of service are from: Ikebukuro to Toshima-en and Hōya; from Shin-Kiba on Tokyo Metro Yūrakuchō Line to Hōya, Kiyose and Kotesashi and from Motomachi-Chūkagai on the Minatomirai Line to Shakujii-kōen, Hōya, and Hannō.
Semi-Express (準急, Junkyū) (SE)
Operated all day. Longest from Ikebukuro to Hannō and Seibu Kyūjō-mae. Through from Yūrakuchō Line to Hannō.
Commuter Semi-Express (通勤準急, Tsūkin Junkyū) (CSE)
Morning hours only, one direction up from Kotesashi to Ikebukuro.
Rapid (快速, Kaisoku) (Ra)
Morning and evening hours to/from Ikebukuro, daytime through to Yūrakuchō Line. Longest to Hannō (seasonally one service a day to Seibu-Chichibu) and Seibu Kyūjō-mae.
Commuter Express (通勤急行, Tsūkin Kyūkō) (CE)
Morning hours only, one direction up from Hannō to Ikebukuro.
Express (急行, Kyūkō) (Ex)
All day operation, from Ikebukuro to Hannō.
Rapid Express (快速急行, Kaisoku Kyūkō) (RE)
Morning rush hour from Hannō to Ikebukuro, daytime to and from Hannō/Kotesashi to Motomachi-Chūkagai via the Tokyo Metro Fukutoshin Line, Tokyu Toyoko Line and Minatomirai Lines.
S-Train (エストレイン, Esutorein) (ST)
Morning and evening reserved-seat services between Seibu-Chichibu and Motomachi-Chūkagai via the Tokyo Metro Fukutoshin Line, Tokyu Toyoko Line and Minatomirai Lines at weekends, and between Tokorozawa and Toyosu via the Tokyo Metro Yurakucho Line on weekdays.
Limited Express (特急, Tokkyū) (LE)
Trains named Musashi (むさし), from Ikebukuro to Hannō, and Chichibu (ちちぶ), from Ikebukuro to Seibu-Chichibu. There is an additional limited express charge.

== Stations ==
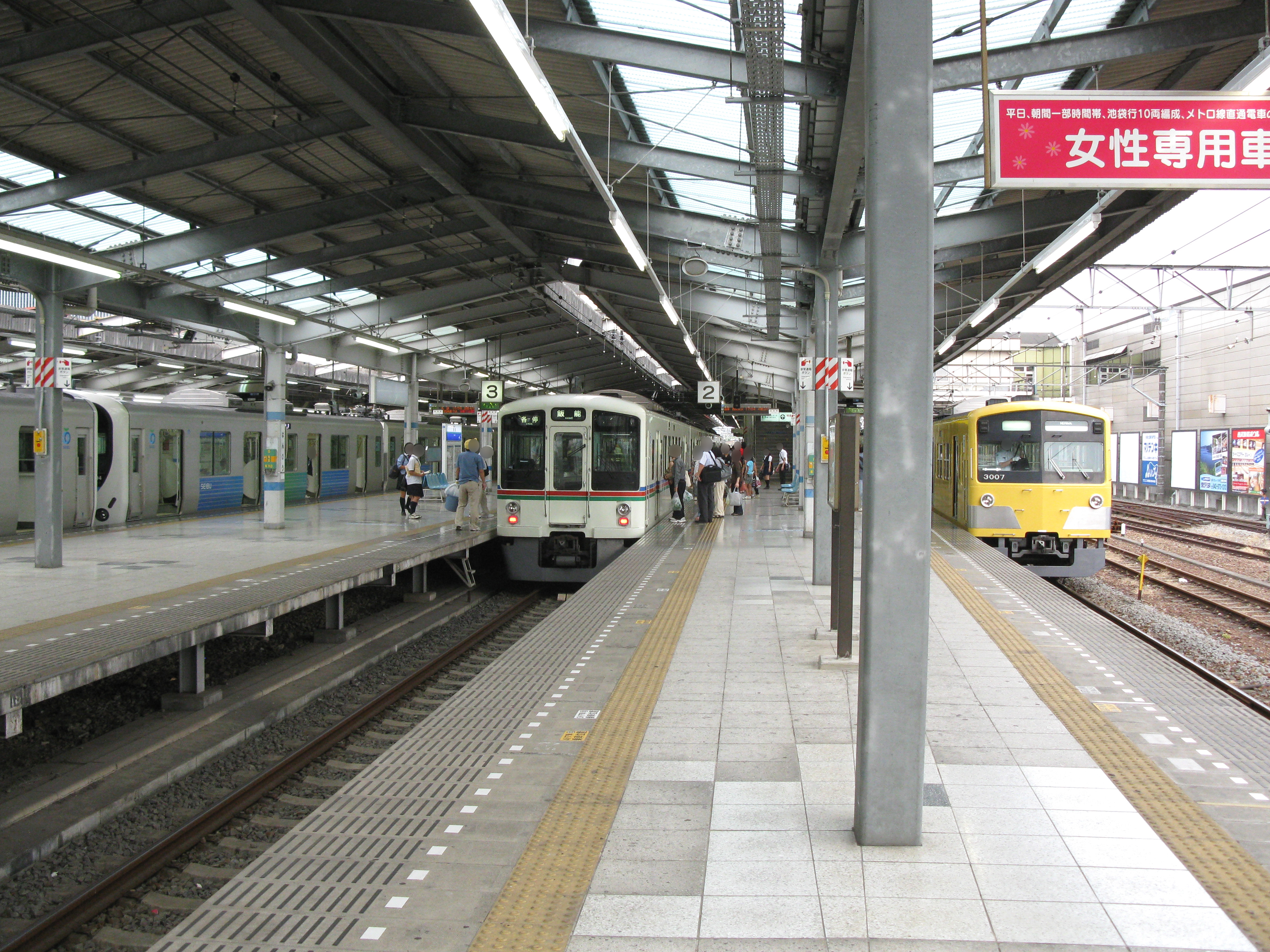
Hannō Station in August 2009

Local services are not shown, as they stop at all stations.

- O: stop; |: pass; ↑: pass (services run in one direction, towards Ikebukuro only); *: limited stop; ↓: boarding only towards Ikebukuro, alighting only towards Tokorozawa (weekdays)

No.	Station	Japanese	Distance (km)	SE	CSE	Ra	CE	Ex	RE	ST	LE	Transfers	Location	
SI01	Ikebukuro	池袋	0.0	O	O	O	O	O	O	(Note: S-Train services stop at the Fukutoshin Line subway platforms on weekends and national holidays for alighting passengers only.)	O	Yamanote Line (JY13); Shōnan–Shinjuku Line (JS21); Saikyō Line (JA12); Tojo Line (TJ01); Marunouchi Line (M-25); Yūrakuchō Line (Y-09); Fukutoshin Line (F-09)	Toshima	Tokyo
SI02	Shiinamachi	椎名町	1.9	|	↑	|	↑	|	↑	(Note: Through services to the Yurakucho and Fukutoshin lines do not stop at any Ikebukuro Line stations east of Nerima.)	|		Toshima	Tokyo
SI03	Higashi-Nagasaki	東長崎	3.1	|	↑	|	↑	|	↑	(Note: Through services to the Yurakucho and Fukutoshin lines do not stop at any Ikebukuro Line stations east of Nerima.)	|		Toshima	Tokyo
SI04	Ekoda	江古田	4.3	|	↑	|	↑	|	↑	(Note: Through services to the Yurakucho and Fukutoshin lines do not stop at any Ikebukuro Line stations east of Nerima.)	|		Nerima	Tokyo
SI05	Sakuradai	桜台	5.2	|	↑	|	↑	|	↑	(Note: Through services to the Yurakucho and Fukutoshin lines do not stop at any Ikebukuro Line stations east of Nerima.)	|		Nerima	Tokyo
Through services via Seibu Yūrakuchō Line				To/from Shin-Kiba via the Yūrakuchō Line; To/from Motomachi-Chūkagai via the Fukutoshin Line, Tōyoko Line, and Minatomirai Line									Nerima	Tokyo
SI06	Nerima	練馬	6.0	O	O	O	↑	|	* (Note: F Liner services only.)	* (Note: S-Train services bound for Tokorozawa stop on weekdays for alighting passengers only. All other S-Train services pass this station.)	|	Seibu Yūrakuchō Line (SI06; Through Service); Toshima Line (SI06); Ōedo Line (E-35)	Nerima	Tokyo
SI07	Nakamurabashi	中村橋	7.5	|	↑	|	↑	|	|	|	|		Nerima	Tokyo
SI08	Fujimidai	富士見台	8.3	|	↑	|	↑	|	|	|	|		Nerima	Tokyo
SI09	Nerima-Takanodai	練馬高野台	9.5	|	↑	|	↑	|	|	|	|		Nerima	Tokyo
SI10	Shakujii-kōen	石神井公園	10.6	O	↑	O	O	O	O	* (Note: Weekday S-Train services stop at these stations for boarding passengers only (towards Nerima) and for alighting passengers only (towards Tokorozawa).)	|		Nerima	Tokyo
SI11	Ōizumi-gakuen	大泉学園	12.5	O	O	|	O	|	|	|	|		Nerima	Tokyo
SI12	Hōya	保谷	14.1	O	O	|	O	|	|	*	|		Nishitokyo	Tokyo
SI13	Hibarigaoka	ひばりヶ丘	16.4	O	O	O	↑	O	O	|	|		Nishitokyo	Tokyo
SI14	Higashi-Kurume	東久留米	17.8	O	O	O	O	|	|	|	|		Higashikurume	Tokyo
SI15	Kiyose	清瀬	19.6	O	O	O	↑	|	|	|	|		Kiyose	Tokyo
SI16	Akitsu	秋津	21.8	O	O	O	↑	|	|	|	|	Musashino Line (Shin-Akitsu: JM31)	Higashimurayama	Tokyo
SI17	Tokorozawa	所沢	24.8	O	O	O	O	O	O	* (Note: Weekday S-Train services start their run at this station for boarding passengers only (towards Nerima) and stop at this station for alighting passengers only (towards Seibu-Chichibu).)	O	Shinjuku Line (SS22)	Tokorozawa	Saitama
SI18	Nishi-Tokorozawa	西所沢	27.2	O	O	O	O	O	|	* (Note: Weekday S-Train services bound for Seibu-Chichibu stop at this station for alighting passengers only.)	|	Sayama Line (SI18)	Tokorozawa	Saitama
SI19	Kotesashi	小手指	29.4	O	O	O	O	O	O	*	|		Tokorozawa	Saitama
SI20	Sayamagaoka	狭山ヶ丘	31.6	O		O	O	O	|	|	|		Tokorozawa	Saitama
SI21	Musashi-Fujisawa	武蔵藤沢	32.9	O		O	O	O	|	|	|		Iruma	Saitama
SI22	Inariyama-kōen	稲荷山公園	35.9	O		O	O	O	|	|	|		Sayama	Saitama
SI23	Irumashi	入間市	36.8	O		O	O	O	O	O	O		Iruma	Saitama
SI24	Bushi	仏子	39.7	O		O	O	O	|	|	|		Iruma	Saitama
SI25	Motokaji	元加治	41.0	O		O	O	O	|	|	|		Iruma	Saitama
SI26	Hannō	飯能	43.7	O		O	O	O	O	O	O		Hannō	Saitama
SI27	Higashi-Hannō	東飯能	44.5							|	|	■ Hachikō Line	Hannō	Saitama
SI28	Koma	高麗	48.5							|	|		Hidaka	Saitama
SI29	Musashi-Yokote	武蔵横手	51.3							|	|		Hidaka	Saitama
SI30	Higashi-Agano	東吾野	53.8							|	|		Hannō	Saitama
SI31	Agano	吾野	57.8							|	|	Seibu Chichibu Line (SI31)	Hannō	Saitama

== Rolling stock ==
- Seibu 001 series (Limited express services)
- Seibu 4000 series
- Seibu 6000 series
- Seibu 9000 series
- Seibu 20000 series
- Seibu 30000 series
- Seibu 40000 series (since 2017)
- Tokyo Metro 10000 series
- Tokyo Metro 17000 series
- Tokyu 5000 series
- Tokyu 5050 series
- Tokyu 5050-4000 series
- Yokohama Minatomirai Railway Y500 series

== History ==
The line opened 15 April 1915 as the Musashino Line (武蔵野線, Musashino-sen) (separate from the Musashino Line currently operated by JR East), by the then Musashino Railway (武蔵野鉄道, Musashino Tetsudō), the predecessor of the present Seibu Railway with the first section from Ikebukuro to Hannō. In 1922, electrification began in three stages from Ikebukuro, until reaching Hannō in 1925. In the late 1920s, a second track was added from Ikebukuro to Hōya Station, and in 1929 the line was extended to Agano Station, the present nominal end. On 25 March 1952, the line was renamed to the Ikebukuro line, and throughout the 1950s and 1960s, the 2-track section was extended in stages until reaching Kasanui yard in 1969.

In 1969, the Seibu Chichibu Line was completed to Seibu-Chichibu Station to begin through operation from Ikebukuro; in 1989, bypass tracks were laid to the Chichibu Railway Main Line; and in 1998, through service via Seibu Yurakucho Line of Seibu to the Tokyo Metro's Yurakucho Line began to Shinkiba Station.

In 2001, a second track of 350 m was built to complete the double-track section from Ikebukuro to Hannō. At the same time, the elevated 4-track section from Nerima-Takanodai to Nakamurabashi opened. This elevated 4-track section was extended to Nerima in 2003.

Station numbering was introduced on all Seibu Railway lines during fiscal 2012, with Seibu Ikebukuro Line stations numbered prefixed with the letters "SI".

From 10 September 2012, 10-car 5050-4000 series sets entered revenue service on the Seibu Ikebukuro Line and Seibu Yurakucho Line, with inter-running through to the Tokyo Metro Fukutoshin Line.

From 16 March 2013, through running via the Tokyo Metro Fukutoshin Line commenced beyond Shibuya over the Tokyu Toyoko Line and Minatomirai Line to Motomachi-Chukagai in Yokohama.

=== Future plans ===
In June 2025, JR East and Seibu Railway announced a plan to enable through service between the Seibu Ikebukuro Line to the Musashino and Keiyo Lines by fiscal 2028. The service would be achieved through a junction near Shin-Akitsu Station on the Musashino Line.

== See also ==
- List of railway lines in Japan
