= Fujimidai Station =

Railway station in Tokyo, Japan

Coordinates: 35°44′09″N 139°37′47″E

SI08 Fujimidai Station 富士見台駅
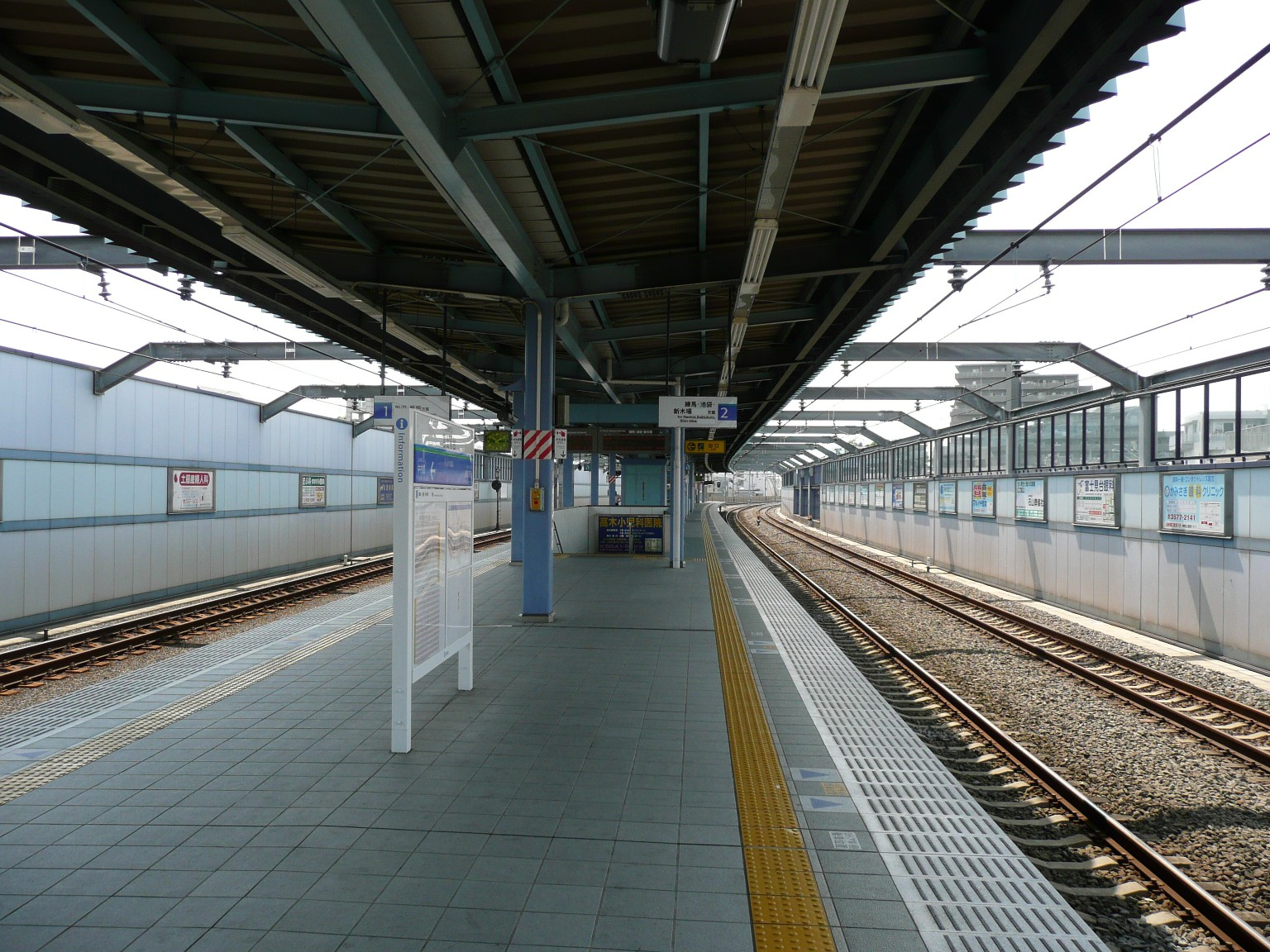
- The platforms, looking west, June 2008

General information
- Location: 3-7-4 Nukui, Nerima, Tokyo （東京都練馬区貫井3-7-4） Japan
- Operator: Seibu Railway
- Line: Seibu Ikebukuro Line

Other information
- Station code: SI08

History
- Opened: 15 March 1925
- Former names: Nukui (until 1933)

Passengers
- FY2013: 24,967 daily

Services
Preceding station	Seibu Railway	Following station
Nerima-Takanodai SI09 towards Agano	Ikebukuro Line Local	Nakamurabashi SI07 towards Ikebukuro
Location

Fujimidai Station (富士見台駅, Fujimidai-eki) is a railway station on the Seibu Ikebukuro Line in Nerima, Tokyo, Japan, operated by the private railway operator Seibu Railway.

== Lines ==
Fujimidai Station is served by the Seibu Ikebukuro Line from Ikebukuro in Tokyo, with some services inter-running via the Tokyo Metro Yurakucho Line to Shin-Kiba and the Tokyo Metro Fukutoshin Line to Shibuya and onward via the Tokyu Toyoko Line and Minato Mirai Line to Motomachi-Chukagai. Located between Nakamurabashi and Nerima-Takanodai, it is 8.3 km from the Ikebukuro terminus. Only all-stations "Local" services stop at this station.

== Station layout ==
Fujimidai Station consists of an elevated island platform serving two tracks, with an additional outer track on either side for non-stop services.

=== Platforms ===
1	Seibu Ikebukuro Line	for Tokorozawa and Hannō
2	Seibu Ikebukuro Line	for Nerima and Ikebukuro; Tokyo Metro Yurakucho Line for Shin-Kiba; Tokyo Metro Fukutoshin Line for Shibuya; Tōkyū Tōyoko Line for Yokohama; Minatomirai Line for Motomachi-Chukagai

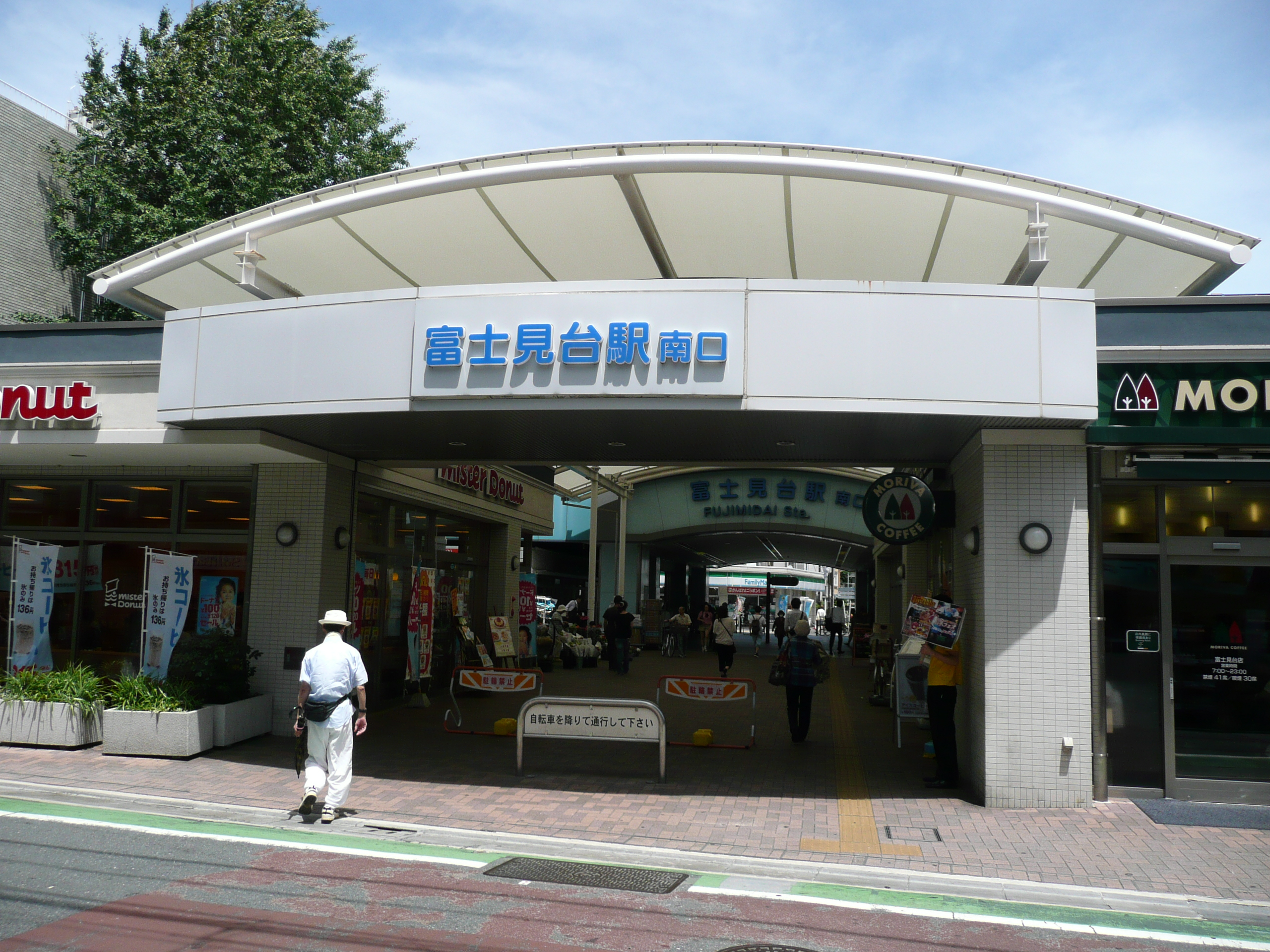
South entrance, July 2012

== History ==
The station opened on 15 March 1925, originally named Nukui Station (貫井駅). It was renamed Fujimidai on 1 March 1933.

Station numbering was introduced on all Seibu Railway lines during fiscal 2012, with Fujimidai Station becoming "SI08".

Through-running to and from Yokohama and Motomachi-Chukagai via the Tokyu Toyoko Line and Minatomirai Line commenced on 16 March 2013.

== Passenger statistics ==
In fiscal 2013, the station was the 42nd busiest on the Seibu network with an average of 24,967 passengers daily.

The passenger figures for previous years are as shown below.

Fiscal year	Daily average
2000	21,428
2009	24,024
2010	23,784
2011	23,588
2012	24,176
2013	24,967

== Surrounding area ==
- Kaze no Ko Hiroba
- Daiyon Commercial High School
