= Nerima-Takanodai Station =

Railway station in Tokyo, Japan

Coordinates: 35.7409°N 139.6165°E

SI09 Nerima-Takanodai Station 練馬高野台駅
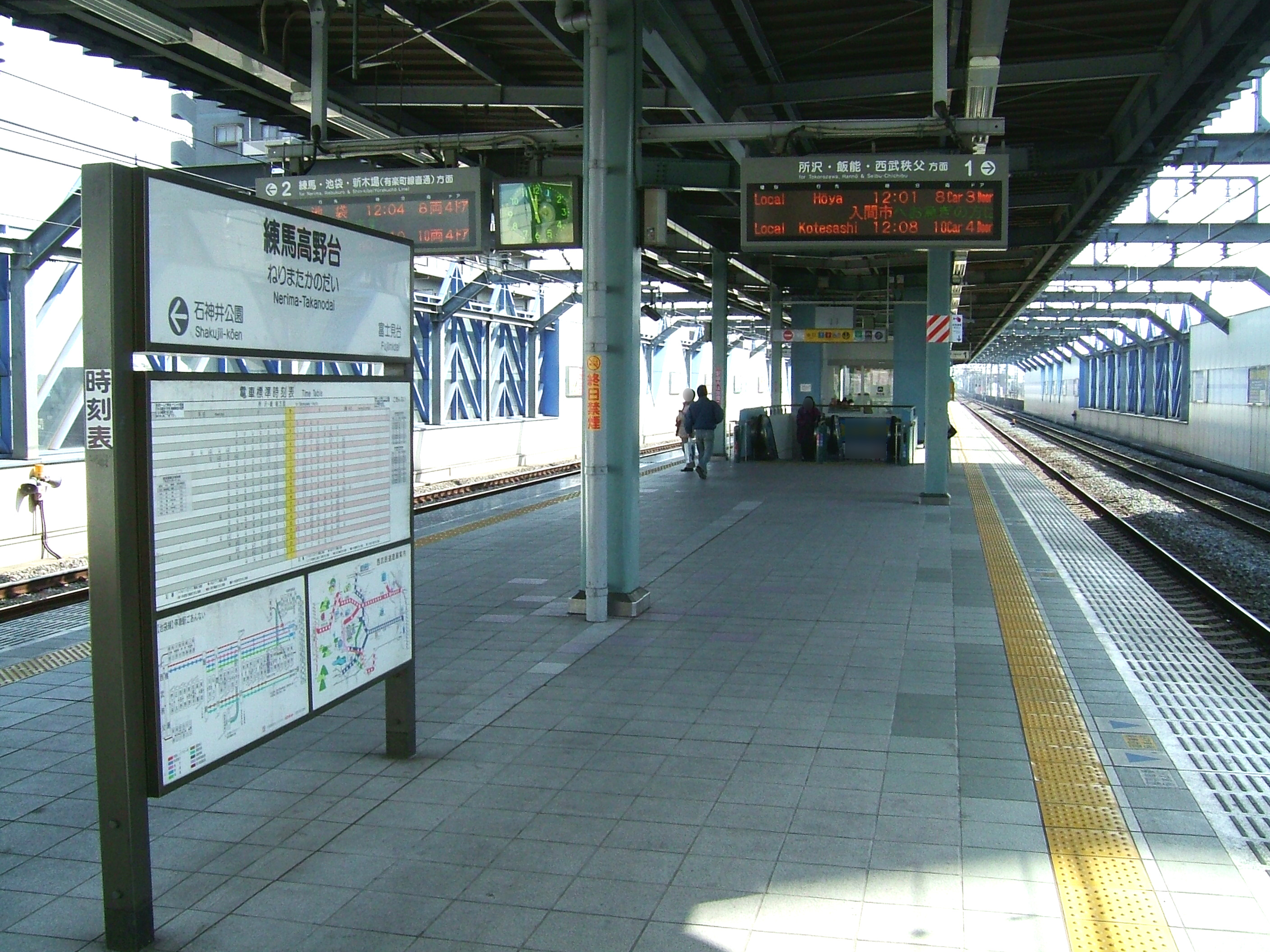
- Nerima-Takanodai Station platform (Seibu Ikebukuro Line)

General information
- Location: 1-7-27 Takanodai, Nerima, Tokyo （東京都練馬区高野台1-7-27） Japan
- Operator: Seibu Railway
- Line: Seibu Ikebukuro Line

Other information
- Station code: SI09

History
- Opened: December 7, 1994

Passengers
- FY2013: 25,930 daily

Services
| Preceding station | Seibu Railway | Following station |
|---|---|---|
| Shakujii-kōen SI10 towards Agano | Ikebukuro Line Local | Fujimidai SI08 towards Ikebukuro |
Location

Nerima-Takanodai Station (練馬高野台駅, Nerima-Takanodai-eki) is a railway station on the Seibu Ikebukuro Line in Nerima, Tokyo, Japan, operated by the private railway operator Seibu Railway.

== Lines ==
Nerima-Takanodai Station is served by the Seibu Ikebukuro Line from Ikebukuro in Tokyo, with some services inter-running via the Tokyo Metro Yurakucho Line to Shin-Kiba and the Tokyo Metro Fukutoshin Line to Shibuya and onward via the Tokyu Toyoko Line and Minato Mirai Line to Motomachi-Chukagai. Located between Fujimidai and Shakujii-kōen, it is 9.5 km from the Ikebukuro terminus. Only all-stations "Local" services stop at this station.

== Station layout ==
The station consists of an elevated (third-floor level) island platform serving the two tracks, with an additional outer track on either side for non-stop services. The ticket gates are on the second floor level, and the two exits (North and South) are on the first (ground) floor level. The North exit leads to a forecourt for buses and taxis.

=== Platforms ===
| 1 | Seibu Ikebukuro Line | for Tokorozawa and Hannō |
| 2 | Seibu Ikebukuro Line | for Nerima and Ikebukuro; Tokyo Metro Yurakucho Line for Shin-Kiba; Tokyo Metro Fukutoshin Line for Shibuya; Tōkyū Tōyoko Line for Yokohama; Minatomirai Line for Motomachi-Chukagai |

== History ==
The station opened on December 7, 1994. Through services to the Tokyo Metro began on March 26, 1998.

Station numbering was introduced on all Seibu Railway lines during fiscal 2012, with Nerima-Takanodai Station becoming "SI09".

Through-running to and from Yokohama and Motomachi-Chukagai via the Tokyu Toyoko Line and Minatomirai Line commenced on 16 March 2013.

== Passenger statistics ==
In fiscal 2013, the station was the 40th busiest on the Seibu network with an average of 25,930 passengers daily.

The passenger figures for previous years are as shown below.

| Fiscal year | Daily average |
|---|---|
| 2000 | 16,328 |
| 2009 | 24,125 |
| 2010 | 24,310 |
| 2011 | 23,996 |
| 2012 | 25,068 |
| 2013 | 25,930 |
