= Ekoda Station =

Railway station in Tokyo, Japan

Coordinates: 35°44′15″N 139°40′22″E

SI04 Ekoda Station 江古田駅
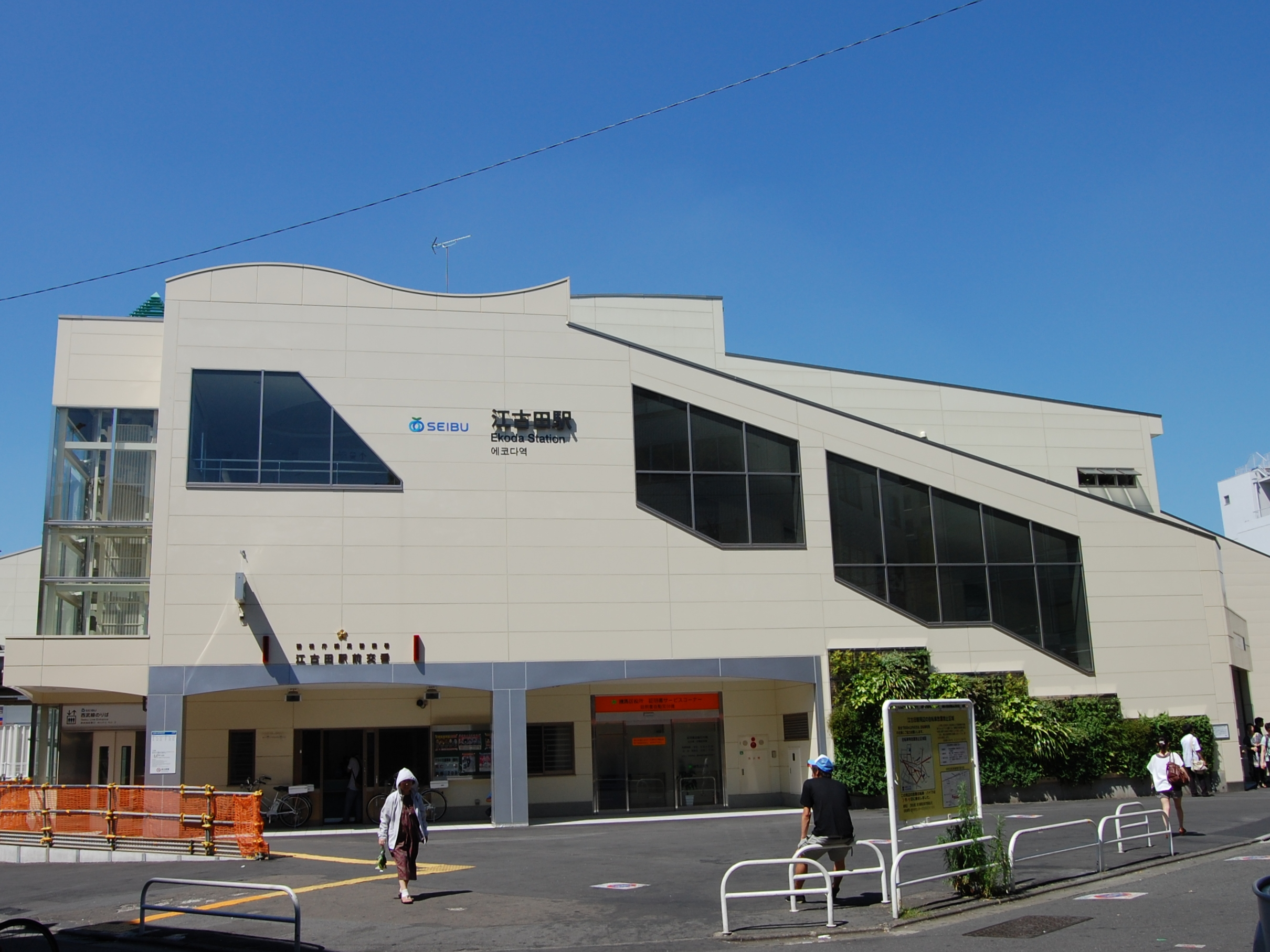
- The south entrance of Ekoda Station in July 2011

General information
- Location: 1-78-7 Asahigaoka, Nerima-ku, Tokyo; Japan
- Operator: Seibu Railway
- Line: Seibu Ikebukuro Line
- Distance: 4.3 km from Ikebukuro
- Platforms: 2 side platforms
- Tracks: 2

Other information
- Station code: SI04
- Website: Official website

History
- Opened: 1 November 1922
- Rebuilt: 2011

Passengers
- FY2013: 34,045 daily

Services
Preceding station	Seibu Railway	Following station
Sakuradai SI05 towards Agano	Ikebukuro Line Local	Higashi-Nagasaki SI03 towards Ikebukuro
Location
- Location within Japan

Ekoda Station (江古田駅, Ekoda-eki) is a railway station on the Seibu Ikebukuro Line in Nerima, Tokyo, Japan, operated by the private railway operator Seibu Railway.

== Lines ==
Ekoda Station is served by the Seibu Ikebukuro Line from Ikebukuro in Tokyo to Hannō in Saitama Prefecture, and is located 4.3 km from the Ikebukuro terminus. Only all-stations "Local" services stop at this station.

== Station layout ==
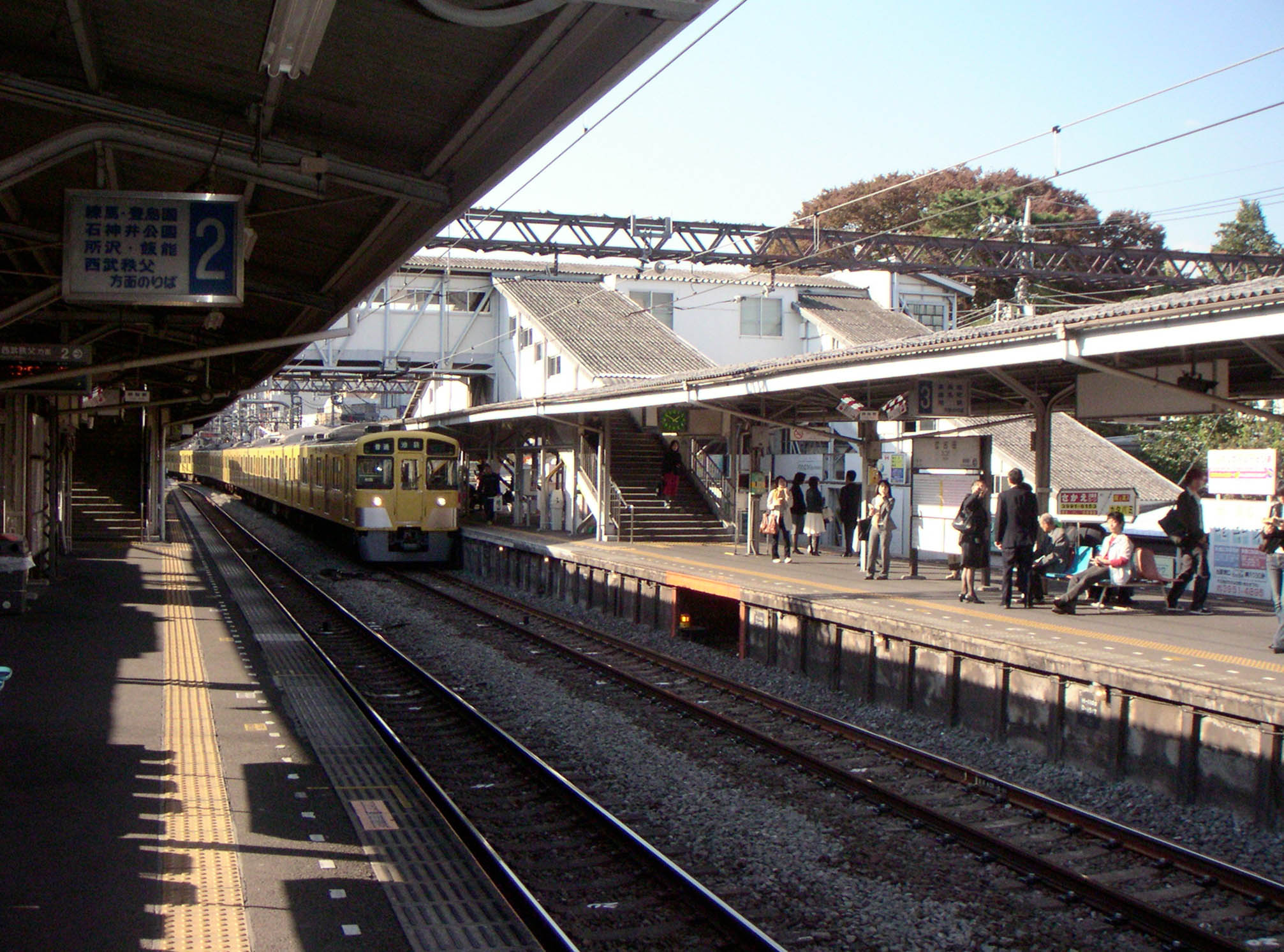
View of the platforms in November 2005

Ekoda Station consists of two side platforms serving two tracks. The platforms are capable of handling 10-car trains.

=== Platforms ===
1	Seibu Ikebukuro Line	for Tokorozawa and Hannō
2	Seibu Ikebukuro Line	for Ikebukuro

== History ==
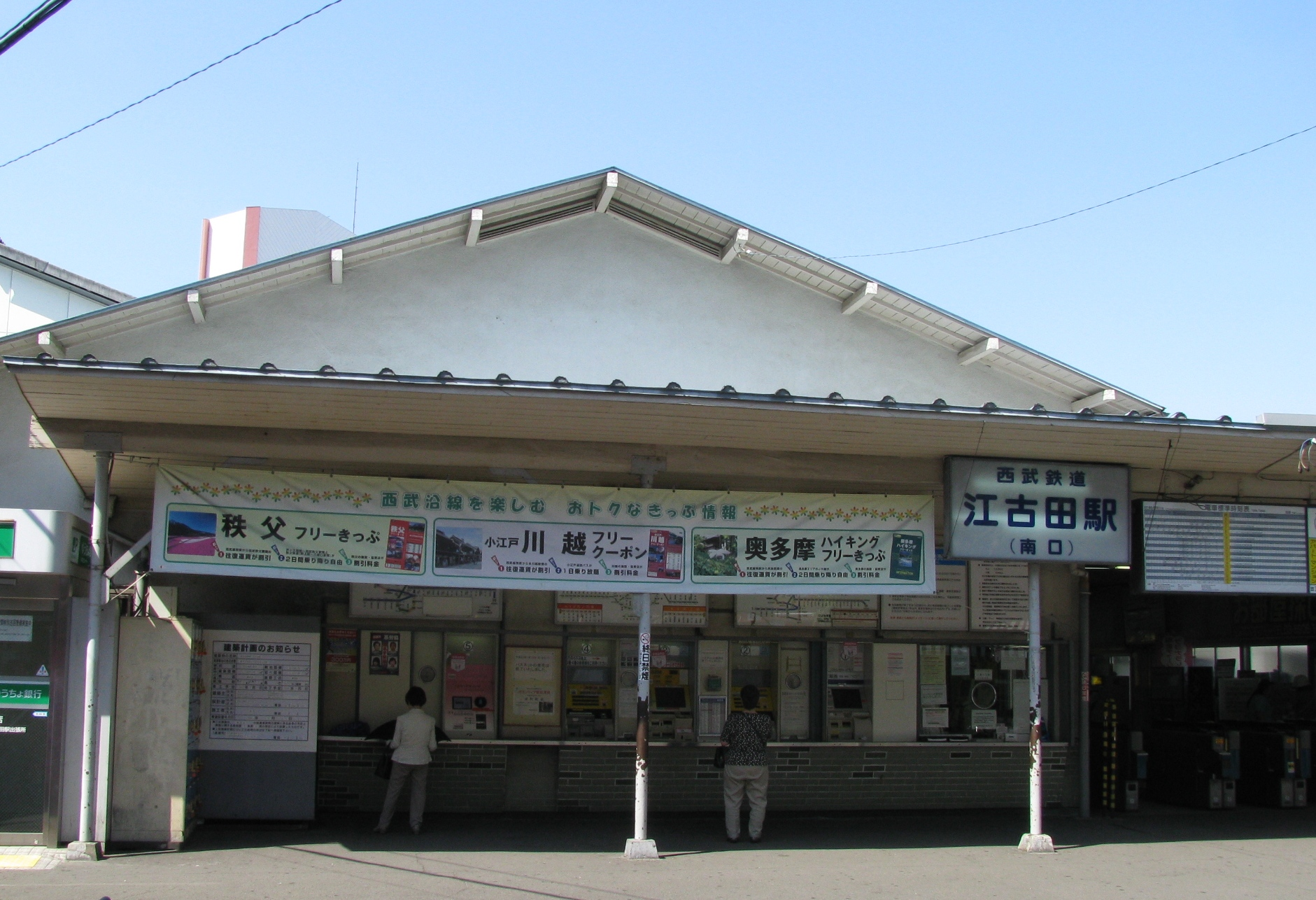
The old station building in May 2008

The station opened on 1 November 1922.

Renovation of the station building began in 2008 and was completed in 2011.

Station numbering was introduced during fiscal 2012, with Ekoda Station becoming "SI04".

== Passenger statistics ==
In fiscal 2013, the station was the 28th busiest on the Seibu network with an average of 34,045 passengers daily. The passenger figures for previous years are as shown below.

Fiscal year	Daily average
2000	39,728
2009	34,527
2010	32,808
2011	32,942
2012	33,535
2013	34,045
2015	32,396

== Surrounding area ==
Several university and college campuses are located nearby the station.

- Musashi University
- Musashino Academia Musicae
- College of Art, Nihon University

== See also ==
- List of railway stations in Japan
