= Nakamurabashi Station =

Railway station in Tokyo, Japan

Coordinates: 35°44′12″N 139°38′14″E

SI07 Nakamurabashi Station 中村橋駅
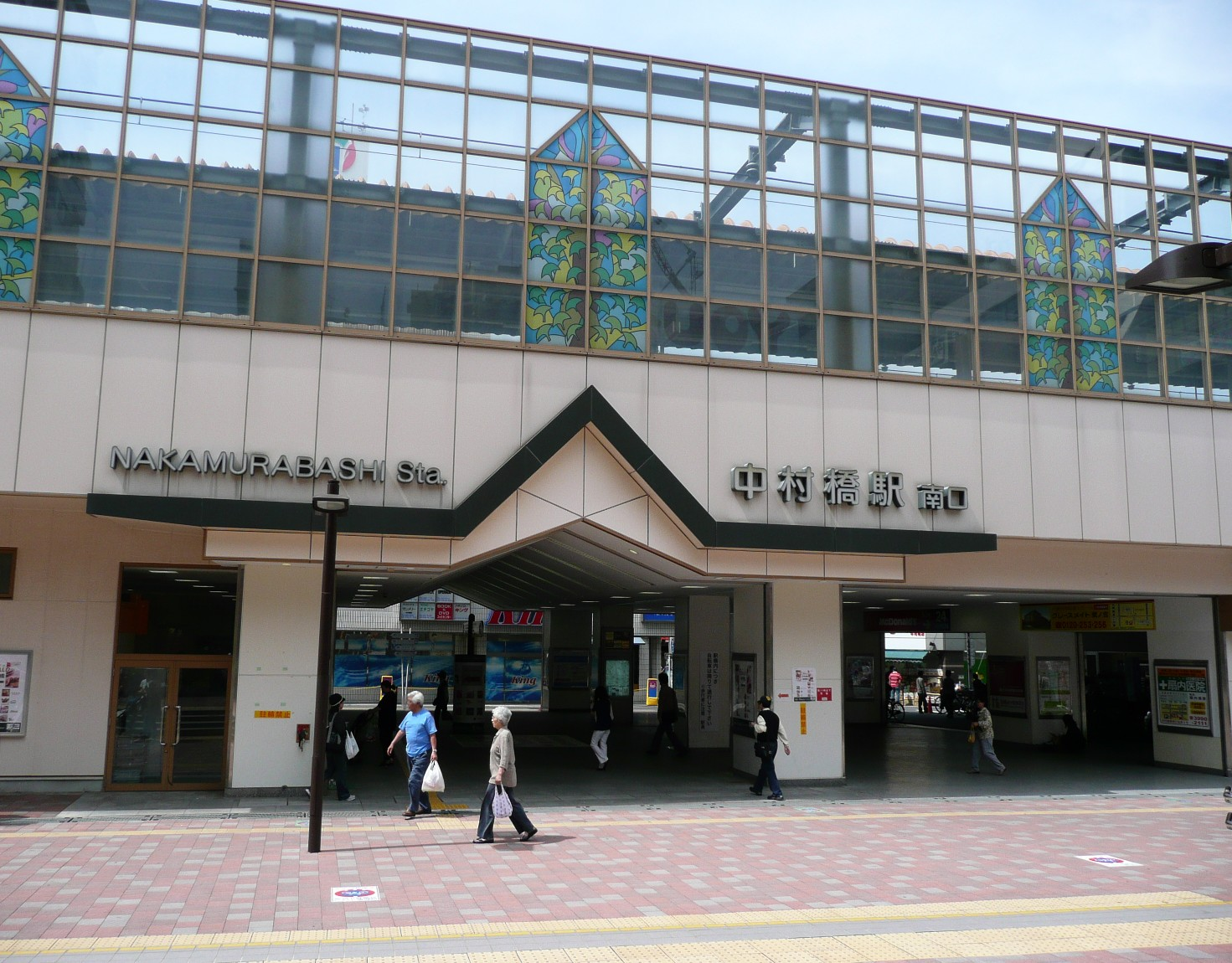
- South entrance, July 2008

General information
- Location: 4-2-1 Nakamurakita, Nerima, Tokyo （東京都練馬区中村北4-2-1） Japan
- Operator: Seibu Railway
- Line: Seibu Ikebukuro Line

Other information
- Station code: SI07

History
- Opened: June 11, 1924

Passengers
- FY2013: 38,913 daily

Services
Preceding station	Seibu Railway	Following station
Fujimidai SI08 towards Agano	Ikebukuro Line Local	Nerima SI06 towards Ikebukuro
Location

Nakamurabashi Station (中村橋駅, Nakamurabashi-eki) is a railway station on the Seibu Ikebukuro Line in Nerima, Tokyo, Japan, operated by the private railway operator Seibu Railway.

== Lines ==
Nakamurabashi Station is served by the Seibu Ikebukuro Line from Ikebukuro in Tokyo, with some services inter-running via the Tokyo Metro Yurakucho Line to Shin-Kiba and the Tokyo Metro Fukutoshin Line to Shibuya and onward via the Tokyu Toyoko Line and Minato Mirai Line to Motomachi-Chukagai. Located between Nerima and Fujimidai, it is located 7.5 km from the Ikebukuro terminus. Only all-stations "Local" services stop at this station.

== Station layout ==
Nakamurabashi Station consists of an elevated island platform serving two tracks, with an additional outer track on either side for non-stop services.

=== Platforms ===
1	Seibu Ikebukuro Line	for Tokorozawa and Hannō
2	Seibu Ikebukuro Line	for Nerima and Ikebukuro; Tokyo Metro Yurakucho Line for Shin-Kiba; Tokyo Metro Fukutoshin Line for Shibuya; Tōkyū Tōyoko Line for Yokohama; Minatomirai Line for Motomachi-Chukagai

== History ==
The station opened on June 11, 1924.

Station numbering was introduced on all Seibu Railway lines during fiscal 2012, with Nakamurabashi Station becoming "SI07".

Through-running to and from Yokohama and Motomachi-Chukagai via the Tokyu Toyoko Line and Minatomirai Line commenced on 16 March 2013.

== Passenger statistics ==
In fiscal 2013, the station was the 24th busiest on the Seibu network with an average of 38,913 passengers daily.

The passenger figures for previous years are as shown below.

Fiscal year	Daily average
2000	38,062
2009	38,509
2010	37,195
2011	37,061
2012	37,689
2013	38,913

== Surrounding area ==
- Nerima Art Museum
- Fujimi Junior & Senior High School
