= Japan National Route 463 =

Road in Saitama prefecture, Japan

National Route 463
- 国道463号
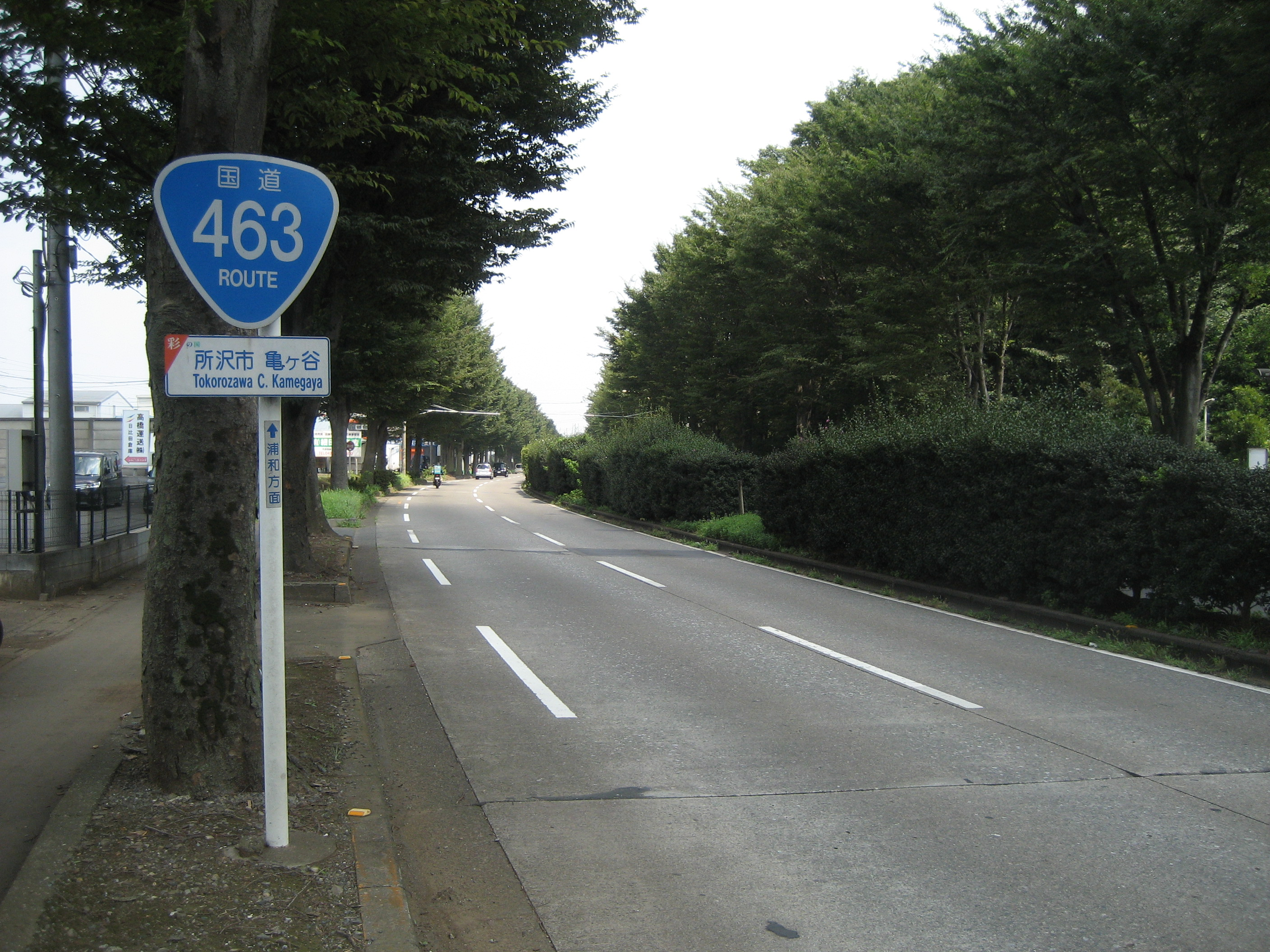

Route information
- Length: 43.8 km (27.2 mi)

Location
- Country: Japan

Highway system
- National highways of Japan; Expressways of Japan
← National Route 462	→ National Route 464

National Route 463 is a national highway of Japan connecting Koshigaya, Saitama and Iruma, Saitama in Japan, with a total length of 43.8 km (27.22 mi).
