= S-Train (Seibu) =

Japanese passenger train service

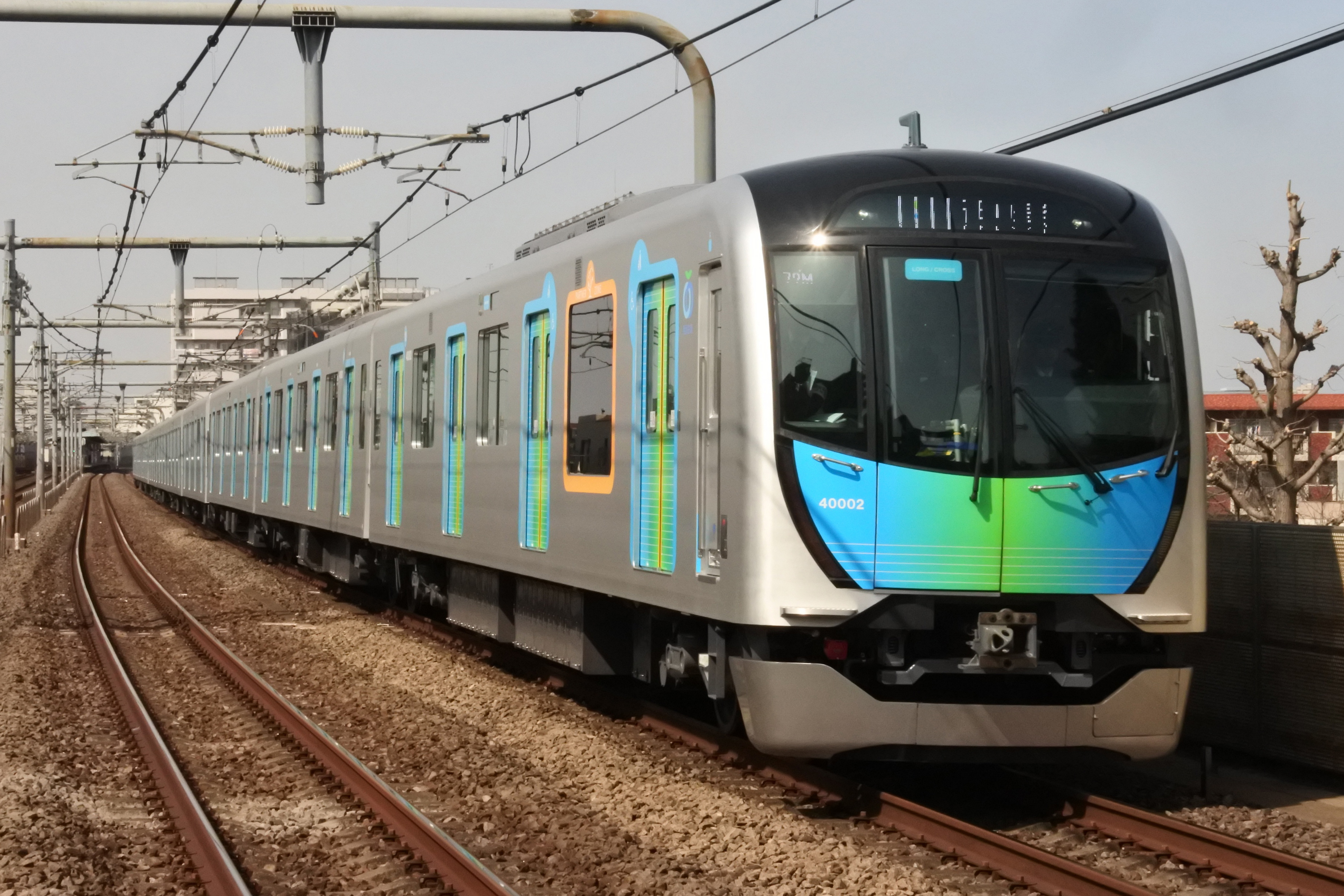
- S-Train logo, and the Seibu 40000 series used on S-Train services

Overview
- Service type: Seat Reserved Commuter Liner
- Status: In service
- Locale: Tokyo, Saitama, Kanagawa
- First service: 25 March 2017
- Current operators: Seibu Railway; Tokyo Metro; Tokyu Corporation; Yokohama Minatomirai Rwy.

Route
- Termini: Kotesashi (Weekdays); Seibu-Chichibu (Weekends); Toyosu (Weekdays); Motomachi-Chūkagai (Weekends)
- Lines used: Seibu Chichibu Line; Ikebukuro Line; Seibu Yūrakuchō Line; Yūrakuchō Line; Fukutoshin Line; Tōyoko Line; Minatomirai Line

On-board services
- Class: Standard class only
- Seating arrangements: Reserved seats

Technical
- Rolling stock: Seibu 40000 series EMUs
- Track gauge: 1,067 mm (3 ft 6 in)
- Electrification: 1,500 V DC overhead
Route map

The S-Train is a reserved-seat Commuter Liner train service operated mainly by Seibu Railway, along with Tokyo Metro, Tokyu Corporation, and Yokohama Minatomirai Railway.

== Summary ==
S-Train service was first announced by the four operating companies on 16 June 2016, with further details being given on 10 January 2017. The service is centered on Seibu Railway, and uses their 40000 series trains. Within the four operating companies, the S-Train is the first-ever reserved-seat train to operate on the Tokyu and Minatomirai railways.

The name "S-Train" was used by the 4 companies during trademark registration on 21 November 2016, and has been trademarked since 21 April 2017 (No. 5941839). The "S" in "S-Train" stands for the following:

- Scene: Used in different scenarios, like commuting to work, going to school or going on outings
- Seat: Comfortable reserved seats
- Seamless: Seamless journey thanks to through service without interchange
- Seibu

The logo has three different colours, each with unique meanings. The upper part of the "S" is coloured green, signifying the greenery alongside the Chichibu Line; the lower part of the "S" is coloured blue, signifying the Minatomirai Line, whose signature colour is also blue; and the text "S-TRAIN" is grey, signifying the urbanisation around Shibuya and Toyosu, which the train serves.

In terms of service type, the S-Train is uniquely positioned. It is positioned lower than Seibu's limited express (the Red Arrow) on the Seibu service hierarchy, but is placed higher than Tokyu's limited express (which does not charge extra fees) in Tokyu's service hierarchy.

== Services ==
Train operation differs between weekdays and weekends.

The direction is denoted by "Up" and "Down", where trains for Toyosu or Motomachi-Chukagai are "up" and trains for Chichibu or Tokorozawa are "down". This is based on Seibu's standards, in which southbound services are "up", and northbound services are "down". The S-Train follows Seibu's standards because it is the main operator of the service. A further reason for using Seibu's standards is to prevent confusion, as Tokyo Metro and Tokyu use reversed denotations of service direction compared to Seibu.

Since all seats on the S-Train are reserved, there are special conductors (specially called "Train Crew" within Tokyu sections) to make sure passengers have purchased seat reservations. Because of this, the S-Train differs from regular Tokyo Metro services, as all S-Train services use driver-only operation.

=== Weekdays ===
On weekdays, S-Trains operate mainly to serve commuters. They run between Tokorozawa and Toyosu, on the Seibu Ikebukuro and Yurakucho Lines, and the Tokyo Metro Yurakucho Line.

There are 6 Toyosu-bound trains and 5 Tokorozawa-bound trains every weekday. S-Trains operate during the evening rush hours, except for one Toyosu-bound train which operates in early morning.

The biggest feature of the weekday S-Trains is that it skips Ikebukuro Station, which is a core transfer terminal on the Seibu Ikebukuro and Tokyo Metro Yurakucho Lines, and is Tokyo Metro's busiest station. Another feature is that it operates as a limited stop service within the Tokyo Metro Yurakucho Line.

S-Trains stop at Tokorozawa, Hoya, Shakujii-Koen on the Seibu Ikebukuro Line, and at Iidabashi, Yurakucho, Toyosu on the Tokyo Metro Yurakucho Line.

=== Weekends ===
On weekends, S-Train services operate mainly to serve visitors. They run between Seibu-Chichibu and Motomachi-Chukagai, on the Seibu Chichibu and Yurakucho Lines, the Tokyo Metro Fukutoshin Line, the Tokyu Toyoko Line, and the Minatomirai Line. The section is 113.8 kilometres (70.7 mi) long, which is the longest distance of any Tokyo Metro through train service.

There are 2 southbound trains (one originating from Seibu-Chichibu, the other from Hanno, all for Motomachi-Chukagai), and 3 northbound trains (one to Tokorozawa, one to Hanno, and one for Seibu-Chichibu, all originating from Motomachi-Chukagai) per day on weekends.

The southbound train from Hanno and the northbound train to Seibu-Chichibu are the only weekend S-Trains that operate in the morning. All other S-Trains operate in the evening.

Passengers cannot board S-Trains at Ikebukuro.

== Stations served ==
=== Weekdays ===
Legend

- ◯ : Stops
- △ : Stops, boarding for northbound trains only
- ▽ : Stops, boarding for southbound trains only
- ◇ : Stops, alighting only
- ※ : Brief stop, no boarding or alighting

Route	Station			S-Train	Connections and Notes
Route	Station No.	Name	Japanese	S-Train	Connections and Notes
Ikebukuro Line system (Note: Kotesashi - Nerima：Seibu Ikebukuro Line, Nerima to Kotake-Mukaihara：Seibu Yurakucho Line)	SI19	Kotesashi	小手指	◇	
Ikebukuro Line system	SI18	Nishi-Tokorozawa	西所沢	◇	
Ikebukuro Line system	SI17	Tokorozawa	所沢	▽	Shinjuku Line (SS22)
Ikebukuro Line system	SI12	Hoya	保谷	▽	
Ikebukuro Line system	SI10	Shakujii-kōen	石神井公園	▽	
Ikebukuro Line system	SI06	Nerima	練馬	◇	(Brief stop to switch between ATS and ATC systems)
Ikebukuro Line system	SI37	Kotake-mukaihara	小竹向原	※	(Brief stop to switch crew members)
Yūrakuchō Line	SI37	Kotake-mukaihara	小竹向原	※	(Brief stop to switch crew members)
Yūrakuchō Line	Y-13	Iidabashi	飯田橋	△	Tōzai Line (T-06); Namboku Line (N-10); Ōedo Line (E-06); Chūō–Sōbu Line (JB16)
Yūrakuchō Line	Y-18	Yurakucho	有楽町	△	Yamanote Line (JY30); Keihin–Tōhoku Line (JK25); Hibiya: Hibiya Line (H-07) Chiyoda Line (C-09) Mita Line (I-08)
Yūrakuchō Line	Y-22	Toyosu	豊洲	◯	Yurikamome (U-16)

=== Weekends ===
Legend

- ◯ : Stops
- △ : Stops, boarding for northbound trains only
- ▽ : Stops, boarding for southbound trains only
- ◇ : Stops, alighting only
- ※ : Brief stop, no boarding or alighting

Route	Station			S-Train	Connections and Notes
Route	Station No.	Name	Japanese	S-Train	Connections and Notes
Ikebukuro Line system (Note: Seibu-Chichibu - Agano：Seibu Chichibu Line, Agano - Nerima：Seibu Ikebukuro Line, Nerima - Kotake-Mukaihara：Seibu Yurakucho Line)	SI36	Seibu-Chichibu	西武秩父	◯	Chichibu Main Line (Ohanabatake: CR31)
Ikebukuro Line system	SI26	Hannō	飯能	◯	
Ikebukuro Line system	SI23	Irumashi	入間市	◯	
Ikebukuro Line system	SI17	Tokorozawa	所沢	◯	Shinjuku Line (SS22)
Ikebukuro Line system	SI10	Shakujii-kōen	石神井公園	◯	
Ikebukuro Line system	SI06	Nerima	練馬	※	(Brief stop to switch between ATS and ATC systems)
Ikebukuro Line system	SI37	Kotake-mukaihara	小竹向原	※	(Brief stop to switch crew members)
Fukutoshin Line	SI37	Kotake-mukaihara	小竹向原	※	(Brief stop to switch crew members)
Fukutoshin Line	F-09	Ikebukuro	池袋	◇	Marunouchi Line (M-25); Yūrakuchō Line (Y-09); Yamanote Line (JY13); Saikyō Line (JA12); Shōnan–Shinjuku Line (JS21); Tojo Line (TJ01); Ikebukuro Line (SI01)
Fukutoshin Line	F-13	Shinjuku-sanchōme	新宿三丁目	◯	Marunouchi Line (M-09); Shinjuku Line (S-02)
Fukutoshin Line	F-16 TY-01	Shibuya	渋谷	◯	Ginza Line (G-01); Hanzōmon Line (Z-01); Yamanote Line (JY20); Saikyō Line (JA10); Shōnan–Shinjuku Line (JS 19); Den-en-toshi Line (DT01); Inokashira Line (IN01)
Tōyoko Line	F-16 TY-01	Shibuya	渋谷	◯	Ginza Line (G-01); Hanzōmon Line (Z-01); Yamanote Line (JY20); Saikyō Line (JA10); Shōnan–Shinjuku Line (JS 19); Den-en-toshi Line (DT01); Inokashira Line (IN01)
Tōyoko Line	TY-03	Naka-Meguro	中目黒	※	(Brief stop)
Tōyoko Line	TY-07	Jiyūgaoka	自由が丘	◯	Ōimachi Line (OM10)
Tōyoko Line	TY-11	Musashi-Kosugi	武蔵小杉	※	(Brief stop)
Tōyoko Line	TY-16	Kikuna	菊名	※	(Brief stop)
Tōyoko Line	TY-21 MM-01	Yokohama	横浜	△	Tōkaidō Line (JT05); Yokosuka Line (JO13); Shōnan–Shinjuku Line (JS13); Keihin–Tōhoku Line (JK12); Negishi Line (JK12); Yokohama Line (JK12); Main Line (KK37); Sōtetsu Main Line (SO01); Blue Line (B20)
Minatomirai Line	TY-21 MM-01	Yokohama	横浜	△	Tōkaidō Line (JT05); Yokosuka Line (JO13); Shōnan–Shinjuku Line (JS13); Keihin–Tōhoku Line (JK12); Negishi Line (JK12); Yokohama Line (JK12); Main Line (KK37); Sōtetsu Main Line (SO01); Blue Line (B20)
Minatomirai Line	MM-03	Minatomirai	みなとみらい	△	
Minatomirai Line	MM-06	Motomachi-Chukagai	元町・中華街 （山下公園）	◯	

== Rolling stock ==
- Seibu 40000 series 10-car EMUs
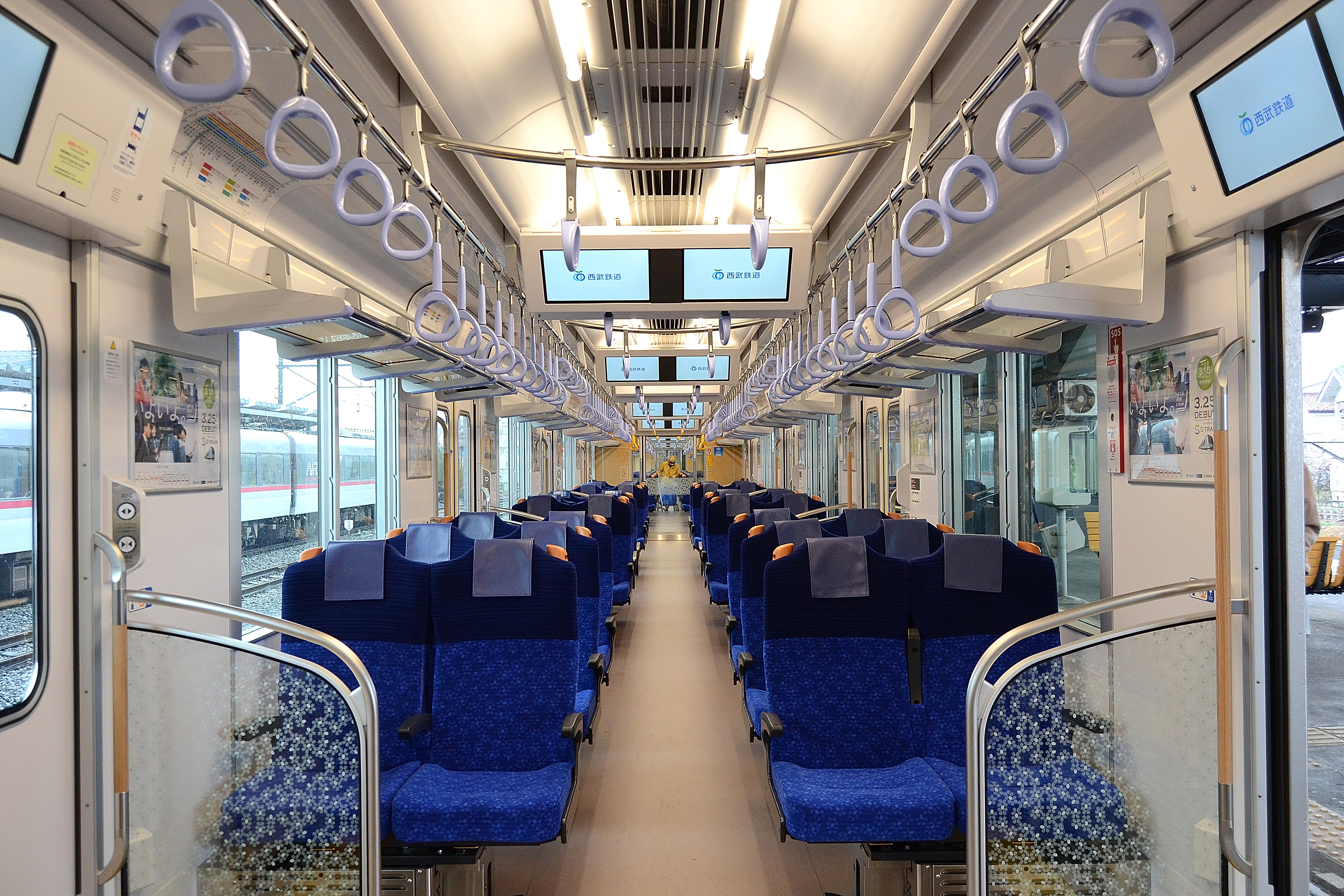
Interior of a 40000 series S-Train carriage, with transverse seat configuration

== See also ==
- F Liner, a similar service to the weekend S-Train
