= Hōya Station =

Railway station in Nishitōkyō, Tokyo, Japan

SI12 Hōya Station 保谷駅
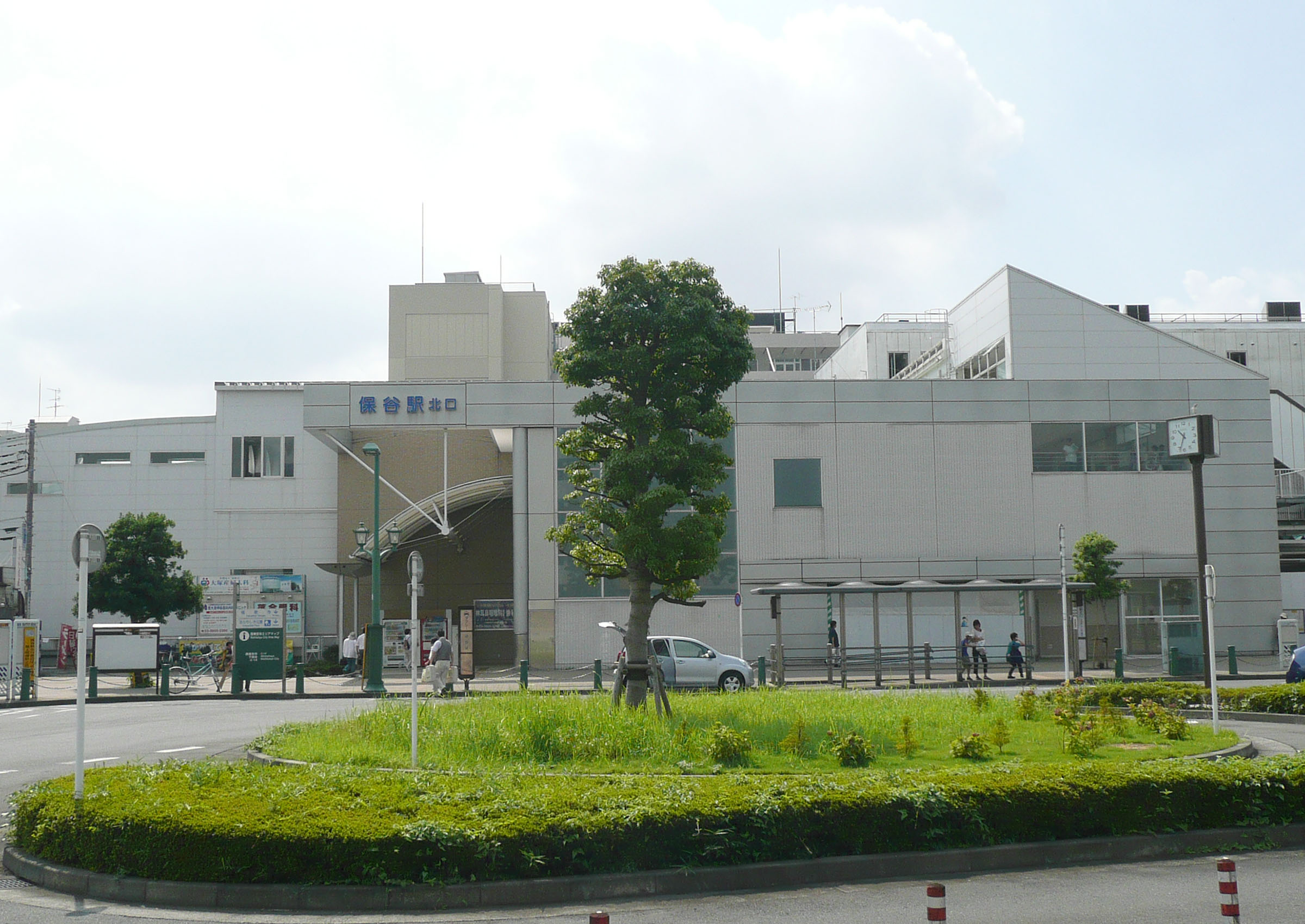
- The north entrance of Hōya Station in September 2011

General information
- Location: 3-14-30 Higashichō, Nishitōkyō-shi, Tokyo 202-0012; Japan
- Coordinates: 35.7484°N 139.5693°E
- Operator: Seibu Railway
- Line: Seibu Ikebukuro Line
- Distance: 14.1 km from Ikebukuro
- Platforms: 1 side and 1 island platform
- Tracks: 3

Other information
- Station code: SI12
- Website: Official website

History
- Opened: 15 April 1915

Passengers
- FY2019: 63,372 daily

Services
Preceding station	Seibu Railway	Following station
Tokorozawa SI17 towards Kotesashi	S-Train (weekdays)	Shakujii-kōen SI10 towards Toyosu
Higashi-Kurume One-way operation	Ikebukuro Line Commuter Express	Ōizumi-gakuen SI11 towards Ikebukuro
Hibarigaoka One-way operation	Ikebukuro Line Commuter Semi Express	Ōizumi-gakuen SI11 towards Ikebukuro
Hibarigaoka SI13 towards Hannō	Ikebukuro Line Semi Express	Ōizumi-gakuen SI11 towards Ikebukuro
Hibarigaoka SI13 towards Agano	Ikebukuro Line Local	Ōizumi-gakuen SI11 towards Ikebukuro
Location
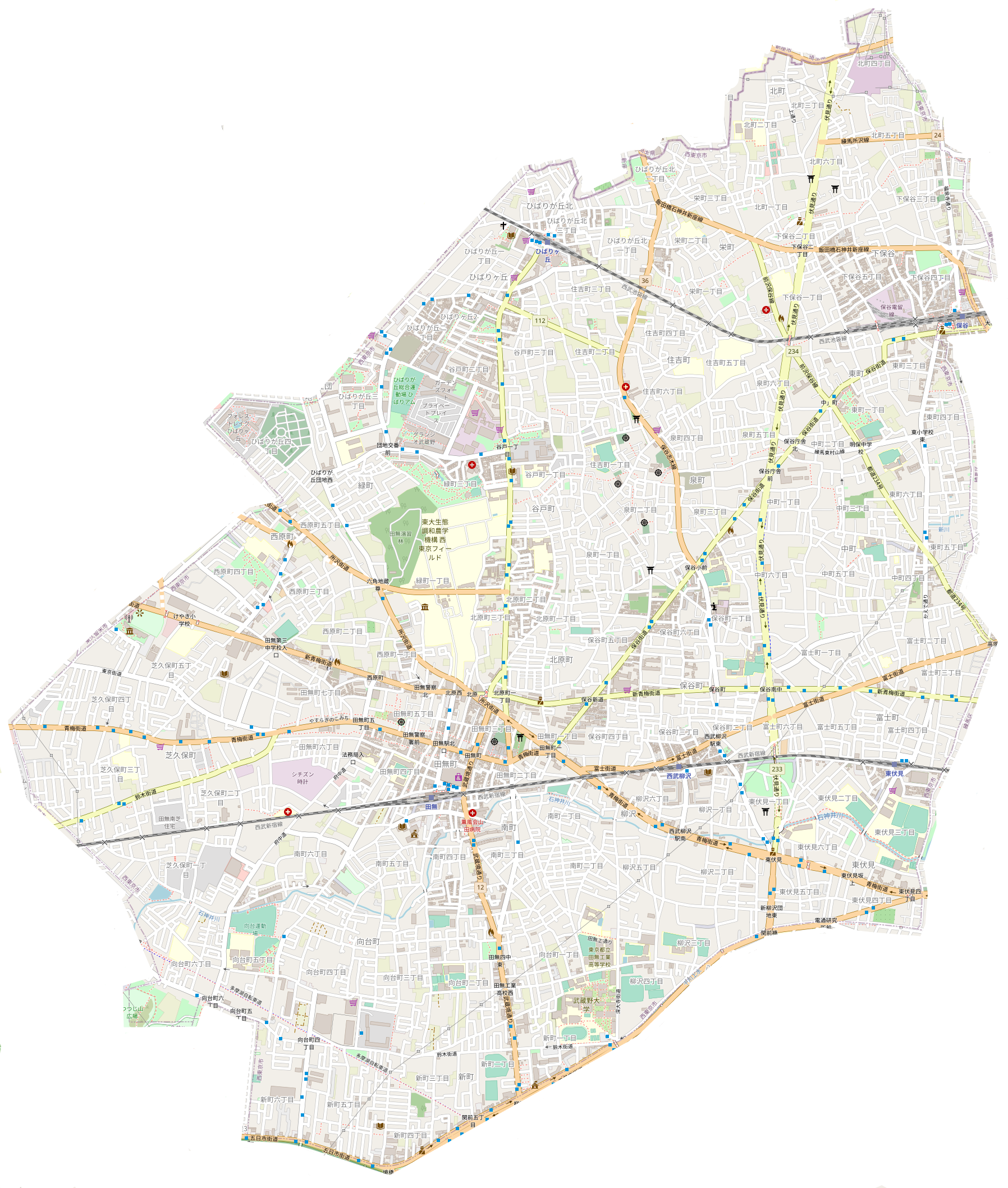
- Location within Nishitōkyō city Location within Tokyo Location within Japan

Hōya Station (保谷駅, Hōya-eki) is a passenger railway station on the Seibu Ikebukuro Line located in the city of Nishitōkyō, Tokyo, Japan, operated by the private railway operator Seibu Railway.

== Lines ==
Hōya Station is served by the Seibu Ikebukuro Line from Ikebukuro in Tokyo, with some services inter-running via the Tokyo Metro Yurakucho Line to Shin-Kiba and the Tokyo Metro Fukutoshin Line to Shibuya and onward via the Tokyu Toyoko Line and Minato Mirai Line to Motomachi-Chukagai. Located between Ōizumi-gakuen and Hibarigaoka, it is 14.1 km from the Ikebukuro terminus.

== Station layout ==
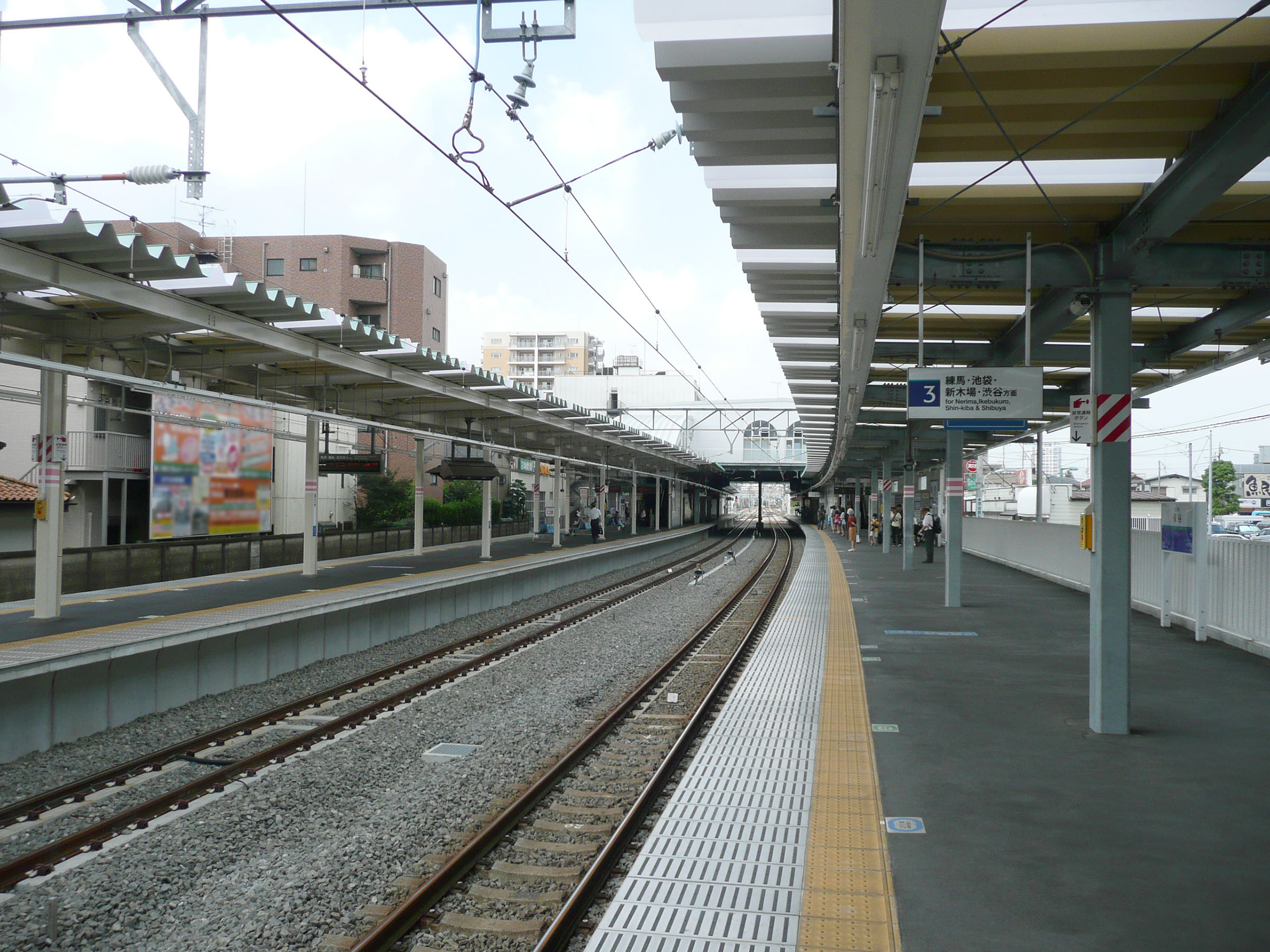
The platforms in September 2011

The station has one island platform and one side platform serving a total of three tracks. The side platform serves trains going up on track 3. The island platform serves trains going down on platform 1 and some trains either go up or down on platform 2.

A siding exists between the running tracks west of the station for use by trains terminating at Hōya. Stabling tracks also exist north of the line to the west of the station.

=== Platforms ===
1	Seibu Ikebukuro Line	for Tokorozawa and Hannō
2	Seibu Ikebukuro Line	for Tokorozawa and Hannō
2	Seibu Ikebukuro Line	for Nerima and Ikebukuro; Tokyo Metro Yurakucho Line for Shin-Kiba; Tokyo Metro Fukutoshin Line for Shibuya; Tōkyū Tōyoko Line for Yokohama; Minatomirai Line for Motomachi-Chukagai
3	Seibu Ikebukuro Line	for Nerima and Ikebukuro; Tokyo Metro Yurakucho Line for Shin-Kiba; Tokyo Metro Fukutoshin Line for Shibuya; Tōkyū Tōyoko Line for Yokohama; Minatomirai Line for Motomachi-Chukagai

== History ==
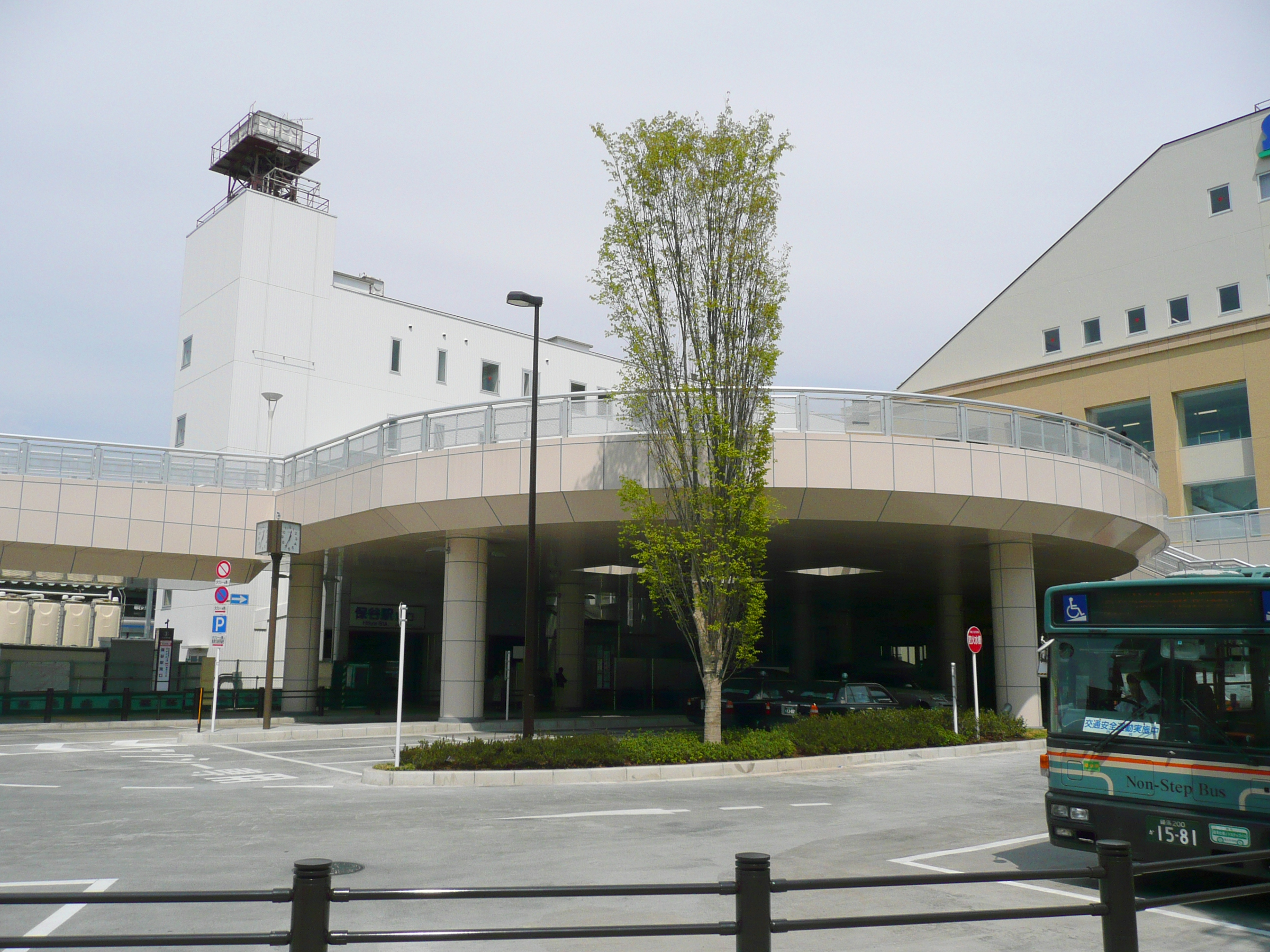
The south side of the station in April 2012

The station opened on April 15, 1915.

Station numbering was introduced on all Seibu Railway lines during fiscal 2012, with Hōya Station becoming "SI12".

Through-running to and from Yokohama and Motomachi-Chukagai via the Tokyu Toyoko Line and Minatomirai Line commenced on 16 March 2013.

== Passenger statistics ==
In fiscal 2019, the station was the 14th busiest on the Seibu network with an average of 63,372 passengers daily. The passenger figures for previous years are as shown below.

Fiscal year	Daily average
2000	52,643
2005	52,954
2010	55,545
2015	60,058

== See also ==
- List of railway stations in Japan
