= Higashi-Kurume Station =

Railway station in Higashikurume, Tokyo, Japan

SI14 Higashi-Kurume Station 東久留米駅
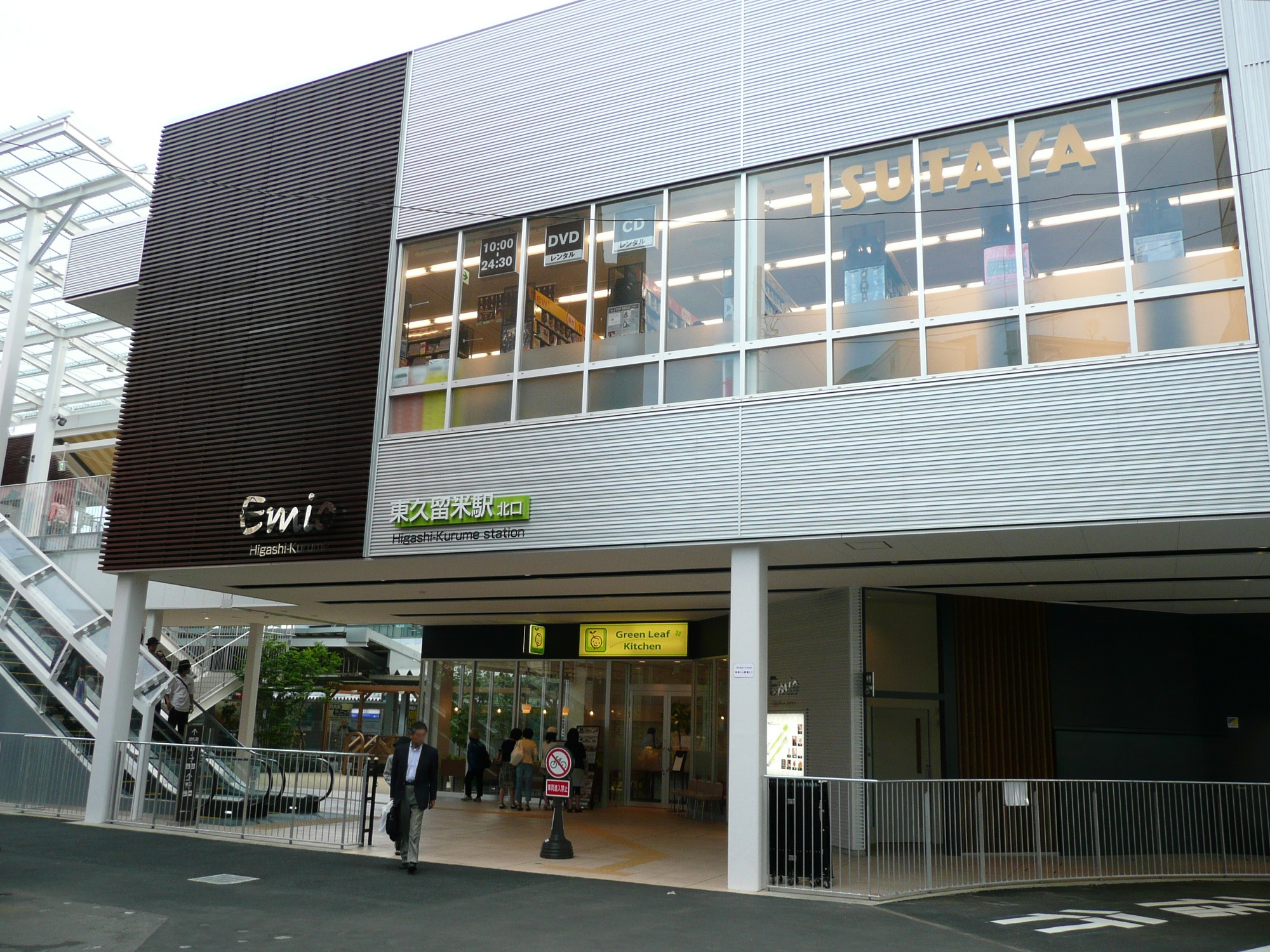
- Higashi-Kurume Station north entrance, June 2010

General information
- Location: 1-8 Honchō, Higashikurume-shi, Tokyo 203-0014; Japan
- Coordinates: 35.7610°N 139.5337°E
- Operator: Seibu Railway
- Line: Seibu Ikebukuro Line
- Distance: 17.8 km from Ikebukuro
- Platforms: 2 side platforms
- Connections: Bus terminal

Other information
- Station code: SI14
- Website: Official website

History
- Opened: 15 April 1915; 111 years ago

Passengers
- FY2019: 54,968

Services
Preceding station	Seibu Railway	Following station
Tokorozawa One-way operation	Ikebukuro Line Commuter Express	Hōya SI12 towards Ikebukuro
Kiyose One-way operation	Ikebukuro Line Commuter Semi Express	Hibarigaoka SI13 towards Ikebukuro
Kiyose SI15 towards Hannō	Ikebukuro Line Rapid Semi Express	Hibarigaoka SI13 towards Ikebukuro
Kiyose SI15 towards Agano	Ikebukuro Line Local	Hibarigaoka SI13 towards Ikebukuro
Location
- Location within Tokyo Location within Japan

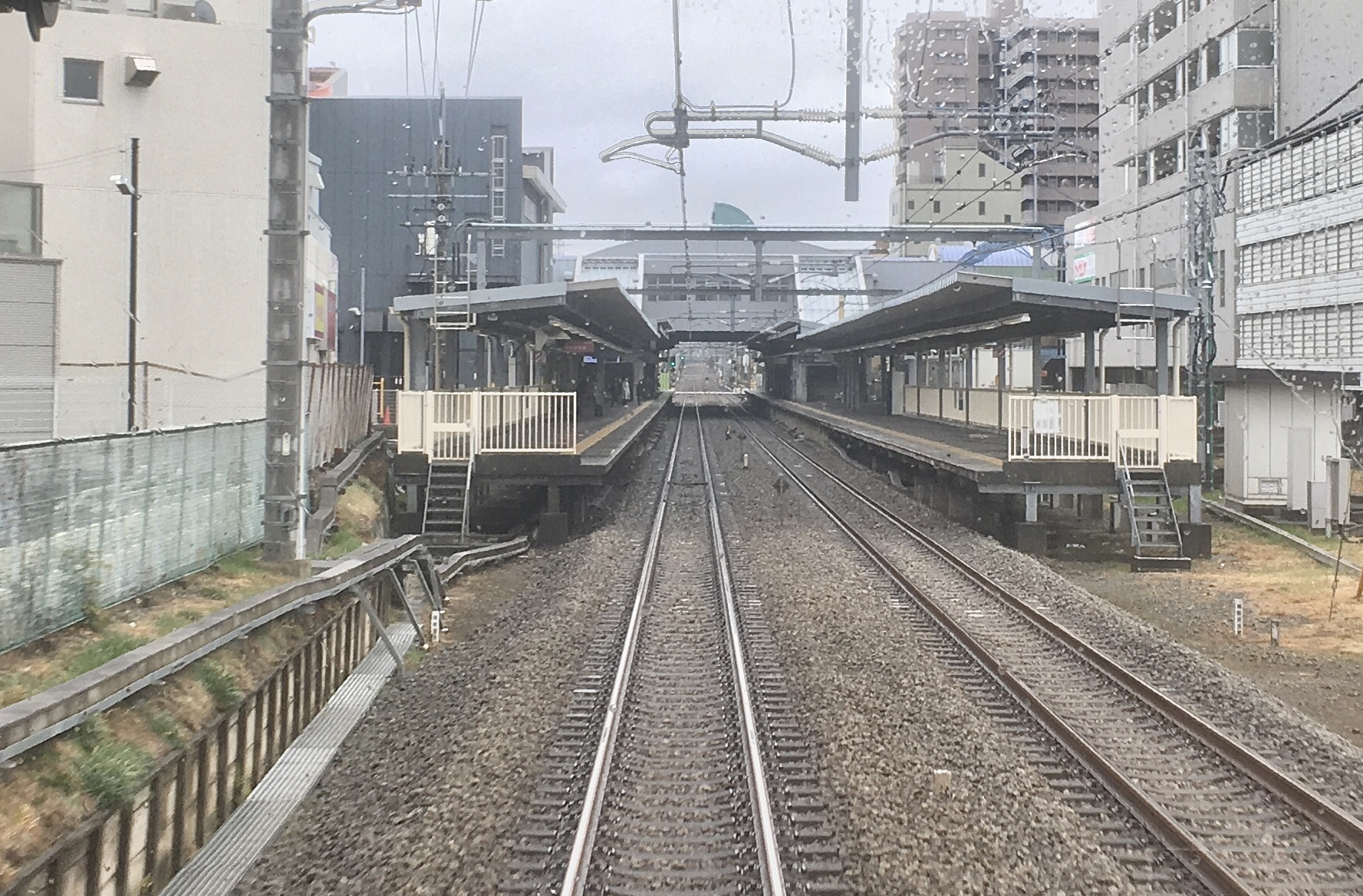
Station platforms, 2021

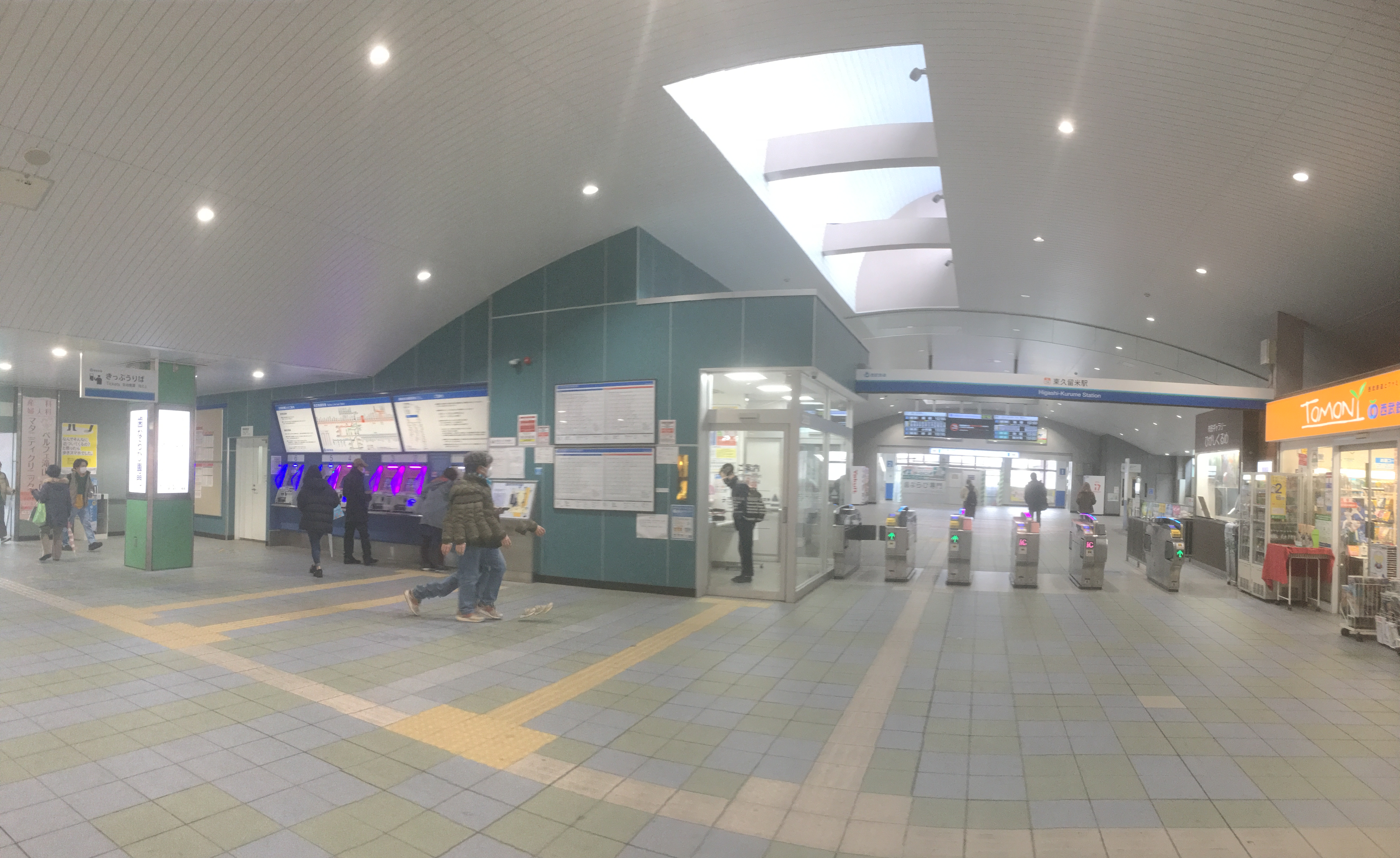
Ticket gates, 2021

Higashi-Kurume Station (東久留米駅, Higashi-kurume-eki) is a passenger railway station in located in the city of Higashikurume, Tokyo, Japan, operated by the private railway operator Seibu Railway.

== Lines ==
Higashi-Kurume Station is served by the Seibu Ikebukuro Line from Ikebukuro in Tokyo, with some services inter-running via the Tokyo Metro Yurakucho Line to Shin-Kiba and the Tokyo Metro Fukutoshin Line to Shibuya and onward via the Tokyu Toyoko Line and Minato Mirai Line to Motomachi-Chukagai. Located between Hibarigaoka and Kiyose, it is 17.8 km from the Ikebukuro terminus.

== Station layout ==
The station has two ground-level side platforms serving two tracks.

The "Emio Higashi-Kurume" shopping and eating complex opened in 2010. The station building includes lavatories for men and women and a wheelchair-accessible multi-purpose restroom.

=== Platforms ===
1	Seibu Ikebukuro Line	for Nerima and Ikebukuro; Tokyo Metro Yurakucho Line for Shin-Kiba; Tokyo Metro Fukutoshin Line for Shibuya; Tōkyū Tōyoko Line for Yokohama; Minatomirai Line for Motomachi-Chukagai
2	Seibu Ikebukuro Line	for Tokorozawa and Hannō

== History ==
Higashi-Kurume Station opened on 15 April 1915. It was named Higashi-Kurume to avoid confusion with Kurume Station in Kyushu.

The station was rebuilt in 1994 with a new structure spanning the tracks and platforms.

The "Emio Higashi-Kurume" station complex opened in 2010.

Station numbering was introduced on all Seibu Railway lines during fiscal 2012, with Higashi-Kurume Station becoming "SI14".

Through-running to and from Yokohama and Motomachi-Chukagai via the Tokyu Toyoko Line and Minatomirai Line commenced on 16 March 2013.

== Passenger statistics ==
In fiscal 2019, the station was the 16th busiest on the Seibu network with an average of 54,968 passengers daily.

The passenger figures for previous years are as shown below.

Fiscal year	Daily average
2005	49,205
2010	52,275
2015	53,984

== Surrounding area ==
- Higashikurume City Office
- Higashikurume Fire Station
- Higashikurumeshi Chikurin Park

== See also ==
- List of railway stations in Japan
