= Hibarigaoka Station (Tokyo) =

Railway station in Nishitōkyō, Tokyo, Japan

SI13 Hibarigaoka Station ひばりヶ丘駅
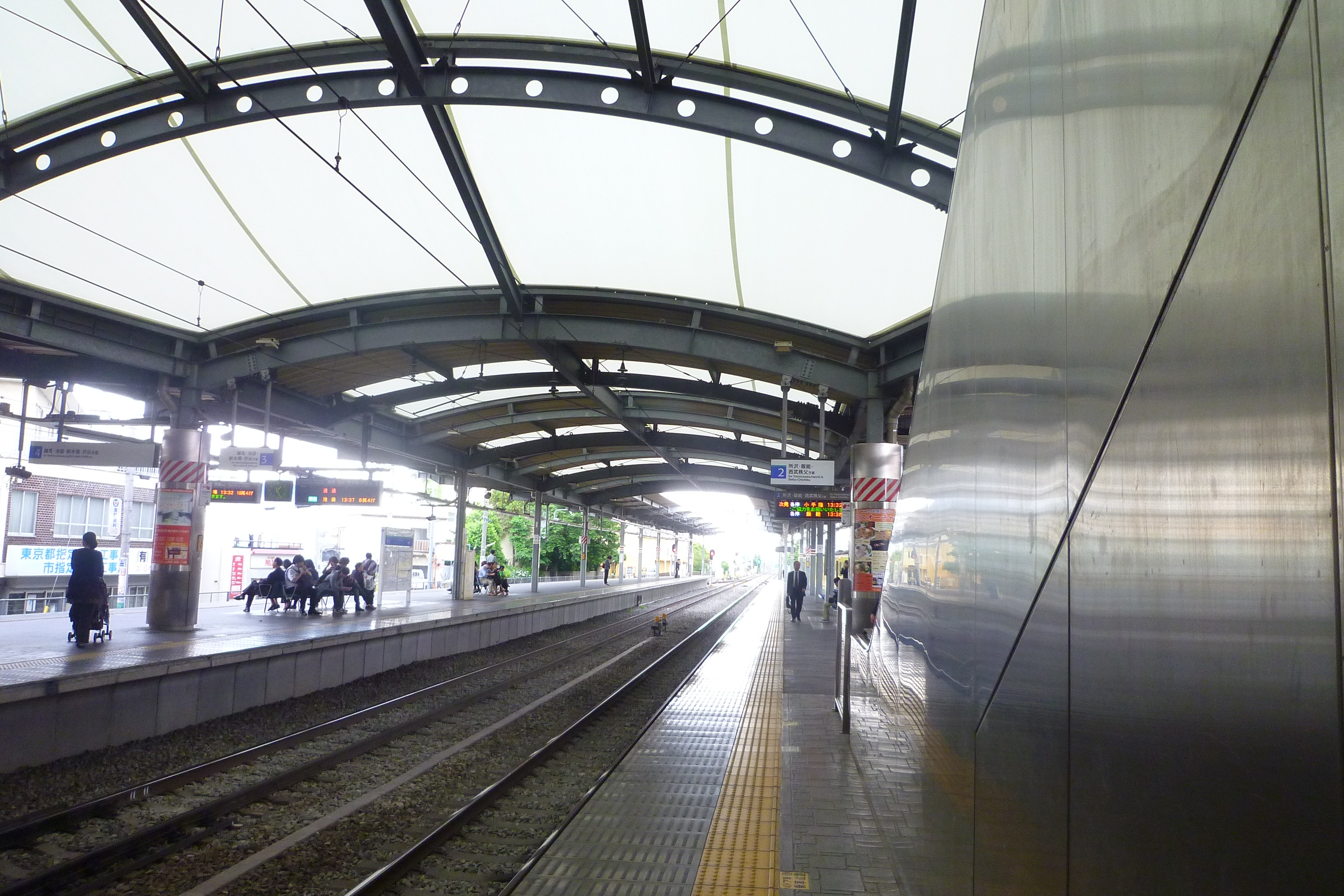
- Hibarigaoka Station (Tokyo) platforms

General information
- Location: 3-9-19 Sumiyoshichō, Nishitōkyō-shi, Tokyo-to 202-0005; Japan
- Coordinates: 35.7516°N 139.5459°E
- Operator: Seibu Railway
- Line: Seibu Ikebukuro Line
- Distance: 16.4 km from Ikebukuro
- Platforms: 2 island platforms
- Connections: Bus terminal

Other information
- Station code: SI13
- Website: Official website

History
- Opened: June 11, 1924; 102 years ago
- Former names: Tanashimachi (until 1959)

Passengers
- FY2019: 74,392 daily
Services
Preceding station	Seibu Railway	Following station
Tokorozawa SI17 towards Hannō	F Liner	Shakujii-kōen SI10 towards Motomachi-Chūkagai
Tokorozawa SI17 towards Hannō	Ikebukuro Line Rapid Express Express	Shakujii-kōen SI10 towards Ikebukuro
Higashi-Kurume SI14 towards Hannō	Ikebukuro Line Rapid	Shakujii-kōen SI10 towards Ikebukuro
Higashi-Kurume One-way operation	Ikebukuro Line Commuter Semi Express	Hōya SI12 towards Ikebukuro
Higashi-Kurume SI14 towards Hannō	Ikebukuro Line Semi Express	Hōya SI12 towards Ikebukuro
Higashi-Kurume SI14 towards Agano	Ikebukuro Line Local	Hōya SI12 towards Ikebukuro
Location
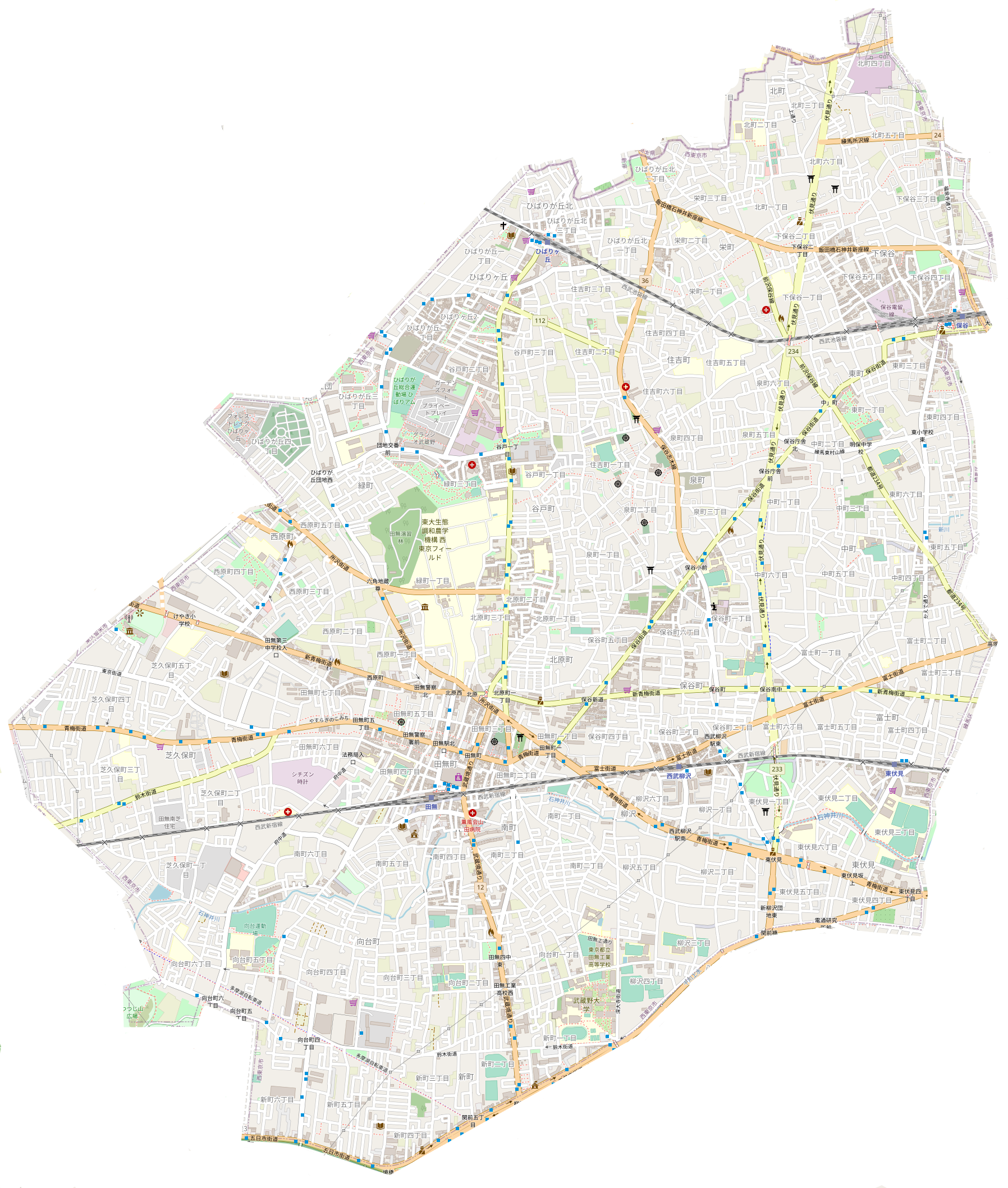
- Location within Nishitōkyō city Location within Tokyo Location within Japan

Hibarigaoka Station (ひばりヶ丘駅, Hibarigaoka-eki) is a passenger railway station located in the city of Nishitōkyō, Tokyo, Japan, operated by the private railway operator Seibu Railway.

== Lines ==
Hibarigaoka Station is served by the Seibu Ikebukuro Line from Ikebukuro in Tokyo, with some services inter-running via the Tokyo Metro Yurakucho Line to Shin-Kiba and the Tokyo Metro Fukutoshin Line to Shibuya and onward via the Tokyu Toyoko Line and Minato Mirai Line to Motomachi-Chukagai. Located between Hōya and Higashi-Kurume, it is 16.4 km from the Ikebukuro terminus.

== Station layout ==
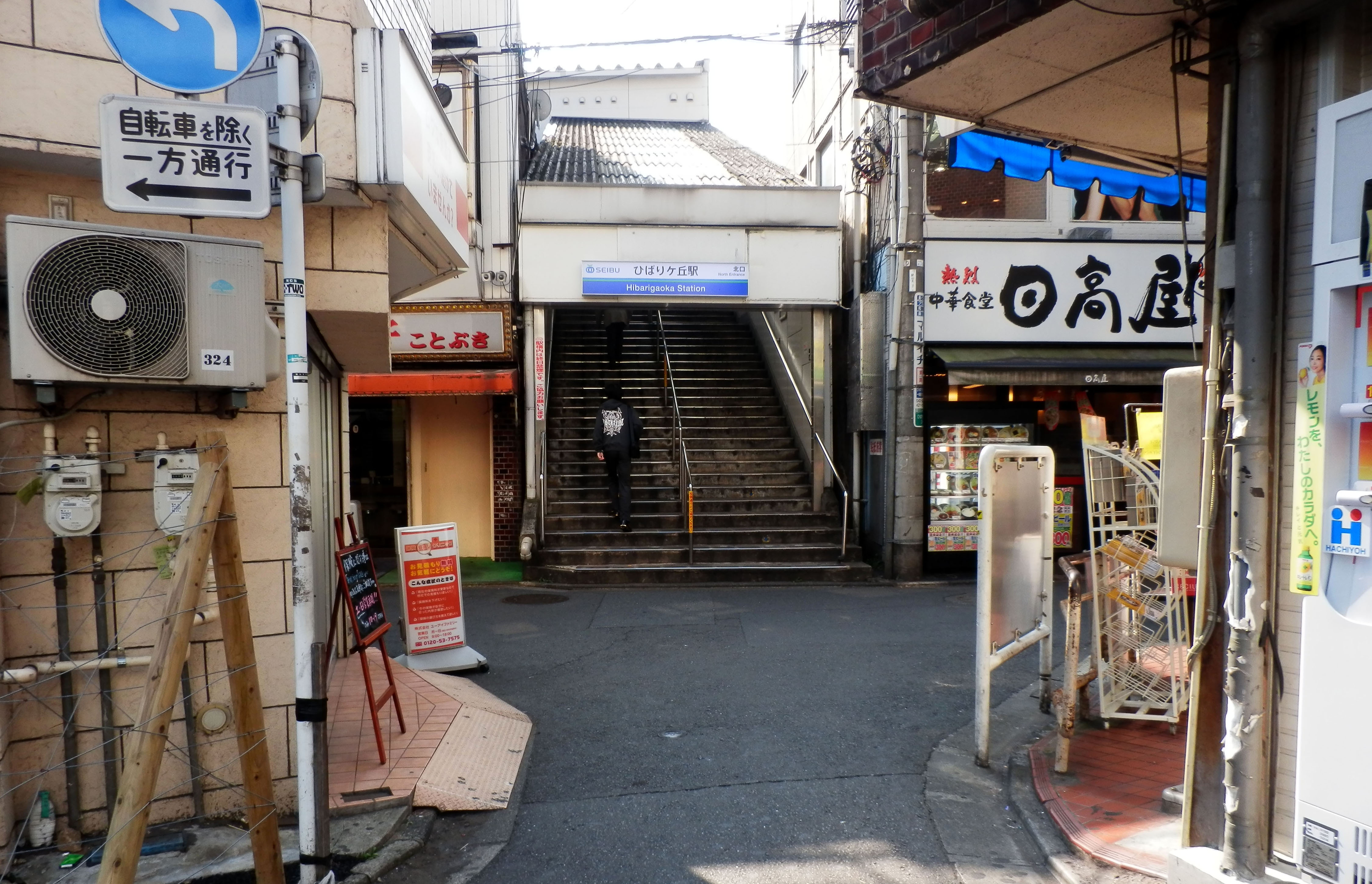
North entrance, November 2012

The station has two elevated island platforms serving four tracks.

=== Platforms ===
1/2	Seibu Ikebukuro Line	for Higashi-Kurume, Tokorozawa, and Hannō
3/4	Seibu Ikebukuro Line	for Nerima and Ikebukuro; Tokyo Metro Yurakucho Line for Shin-Kiba; Tokyo Metro Fukutoshin Line for Shibuya; Tōkyū Tōyoko Line for Yokohama; Minatomirai Line for Motomachi-Chukagai

== History ==
The station opened on June 11, 1924 as Tanashimachi Station (田無町駅). It gained its current name on May 1, 1959, following the construction of the Hibarigaoka Housing Estate nearby.

Station numbering was introduced on all Seibu Railway lines during fiscal 2012, with Hibarigaoka Station becoming "SI13".

Through-running to and from Yokohama and Motomachi-Chukagai via the Tokyu Toyoko Line and Minatomirai Line commenced on 16 March 2013.

== Passenger statistics ==
In fiscal 2019, the station was the 12th busiest on the Seibu network with an average of 74,392 passengers daily.

The passenger figures for previous years are as shown below.

Fiscal year	Daily average
2000	65,247
2005	66,033
2010	67,591
2015	69,024

== Surrounding area ==
- Hibarigaoka Housing Estate

== See also ==
- Hibarigaoka Station (Hokkaido), a station in Hokkaido with the same name
- List of railway stations in Japan
