= Ōizumi-gakuen Station =

Railway station in Tokyo, Japan

Coordinates: 35°44′58″N 139°35′13″E

SI11 Ōizumi-gakuen Station 大泉学園駅
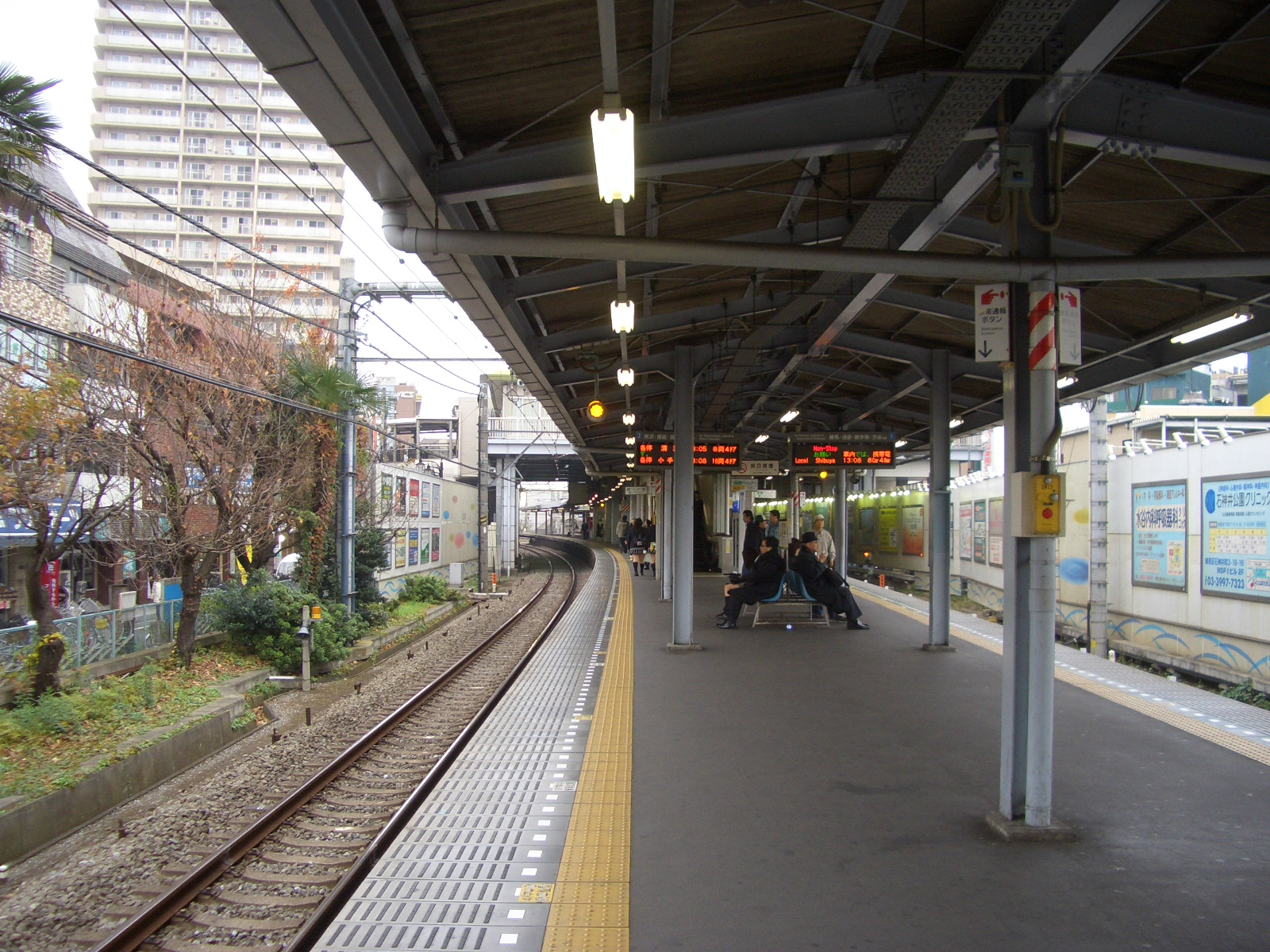
- View of the platforms, December 2008

General information
- Location: 1-29-7 Higashi-oizumi, Nerima, Tokyo （東京都練馬区東大泉1-29-7） Japan
- Operator: Seibu Railway
- Line: Seibu Ikebukuro Line

Other information
- Station code: SI11

History
- Opened: November 1, 1924
- Former names: Higashi-Ōizumi (until 1933)

Passengers
- FY2013: 84,006 daily

Services
| Preceding station | Seibu Railway | Following station |
|---|---|---|
| Hōya One-way operation | Ikebukuro Line Commuter Express | Shakujii-kōen SI10 towards Ikebukuro |
| Hōya One-way operation | Ikebukuro Line Commuter Semi-Express | Nerima SI06 towards Ikebukuro |
| Hōya SI12 towards Hannō | Ikebukuro Line Semi Express | Shakujii-kōen SI10 towards Ikebukuro |
| Hōya SI12 towards Agano | Ikebukuro Line Local | Shakujii-kōen SI10 towards Ikebukuro |
Location

Ōizumi-gakuen Station (大泉学園駅, Ōizumi-gakuen-eki) is a railway station on the Seibu Ikebukuro Line in Nerima, Tokyo, Japan, operated by the private railway operator Seibu Railway.

== Lines ==
Ōizumi-gakuen Station is served by the Seibu Ikebukuro Line from Ikebukuro in Tokyo, with some services inter-running via the Tokyo Metro Yurakucho Line to Shin-Kiba and the Tokyo Metro Fukutoshin Line to Shibuya and onward via the Tokyu Toyoko Line and Minato Mirai Line to Motomachi-Chukagai. Located between Shakujii-kōen and Hōya, it is 12.5 km from the Ikebukuro terminus.

== Station layout ==
The station has one ground-level island platform, serving two tracks.

The station is located close to the home of Leiji Matsumoto, the creator of the anime Galaxy Express 999, and includes a statue of the Conductor from the series. From 2009, the station departure melody was changed to the Galaxy Express 999 theme tune.

Oizumi Anime Gate opened in April 2015 on the pedestrian deck outside the north exit of Oizumi Gakuen Station with life-sized bronze statues of popular anime characters originating in Nerima, such as Astro Boy from the series of the same name, Joe Yabuki from "Ashita no Joe", Tetsuro Hoshino and Maetel from Galaxy Express 999, and Lum from Urusei Yatsura.

=== Platforms ===
| 1 | Seibu Ikebukuro Line | for Nerima and Ikebukuro; Tokyo Metro Yurakucho Line for Shin-Kiba; Tokyo Metro Fukutoshin Line for Shibuya; Tōkyū Tōyoko Line for Yokohama; Minatomirai Line for Motomachi-Chukagai |
| 2 | Seibu Ikebukuro Line | for Tokorozawa and Hannō |

== History ==
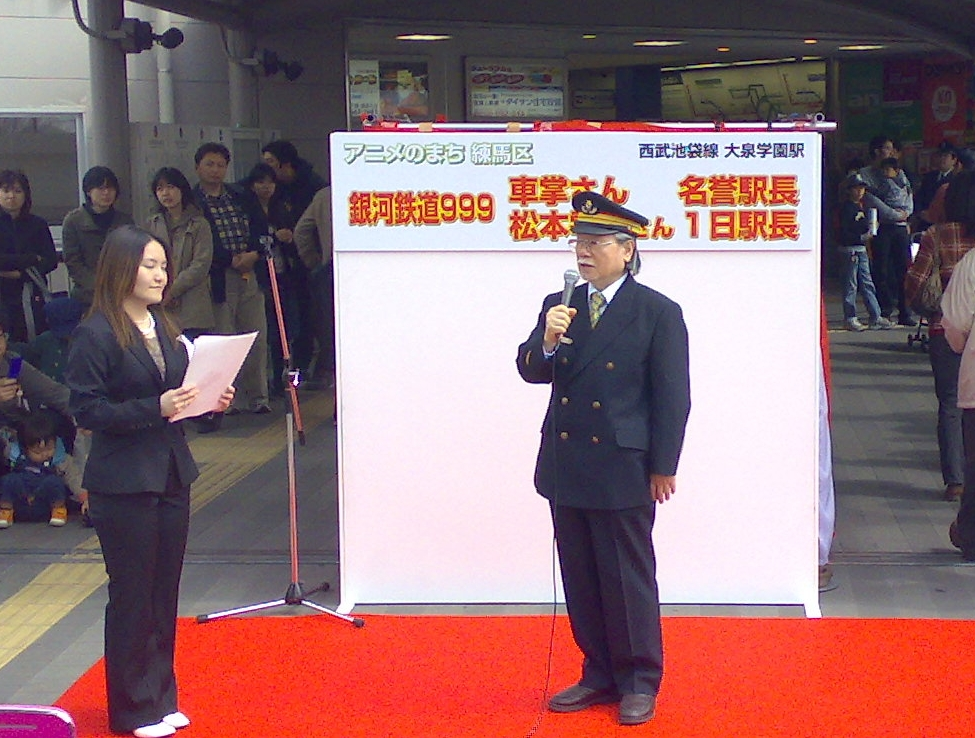
Animator Leiji Matsumoto being appointed honorary station master for one day in March 2008

The station first opened on November 1, 1924, as Higashi-Ōizumi Station (東大泉駅), and was renamed Ōizumi-gakuen Station on March 1, 1933.

Station numbering was introduced on all Seibu Railway lines during fiscal 2012, with Ōizumi-gakuen Station becoming "SI11".

Through-running to and from Yokohama and Motomachi-Chukagai via the Tokyu Toyoko Line and Minatomirai Line commenced on 16 March 2013.

== Passenger statistics ==
In fiscal 2013, the station was the 8th busiest on the Seibu network with an average of 84,006 passengers daily.

The passenger figures for previous years are as shown below.

| Fiscal year | Daily average |
|---|---|
| 2000 | 75,570 |
| 2009 | 84,089 |
| 2010 | 83,002 |
| 2011 | 81,725 |
| 2012 | 82,786 |
| 2013 | 84,006 |

== Surrounding area ==
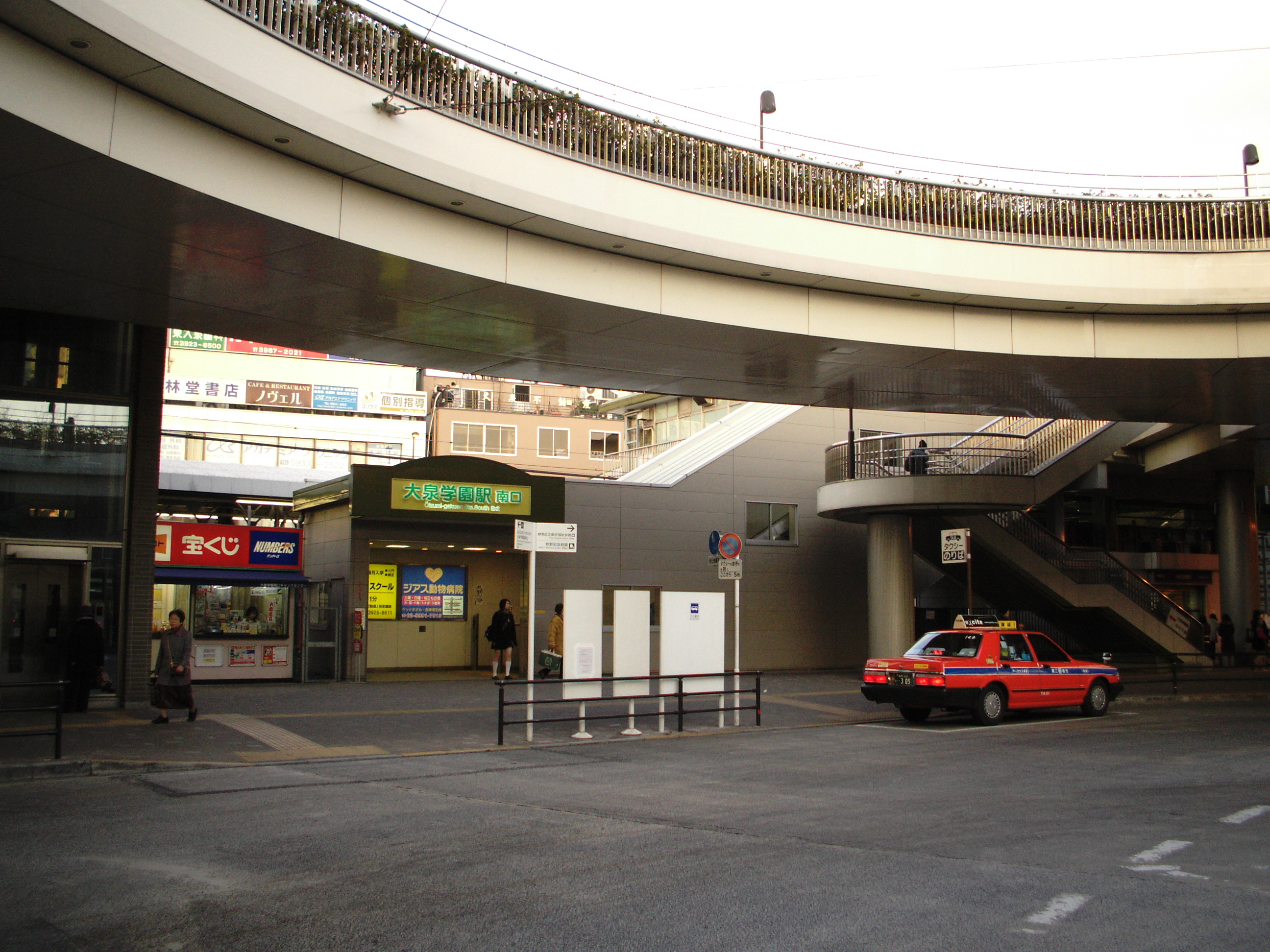
The south exit of the station, February 2007

- Ōizumi Gakuen Yumeria Hall, Shop, and Tower
- Toei Tokyo Film & Animation Studios
- High School Ōizumi (associated with Tokyo Gakugei University)
- Ōizumi Metropolitan High School
