= Shakujii-kōen Station =

Railway station in Tokyo, Japan

Coordinates: 35.743778°N 139.607027°E

SI10 Shakujii-kōen Station 石神井公園駅
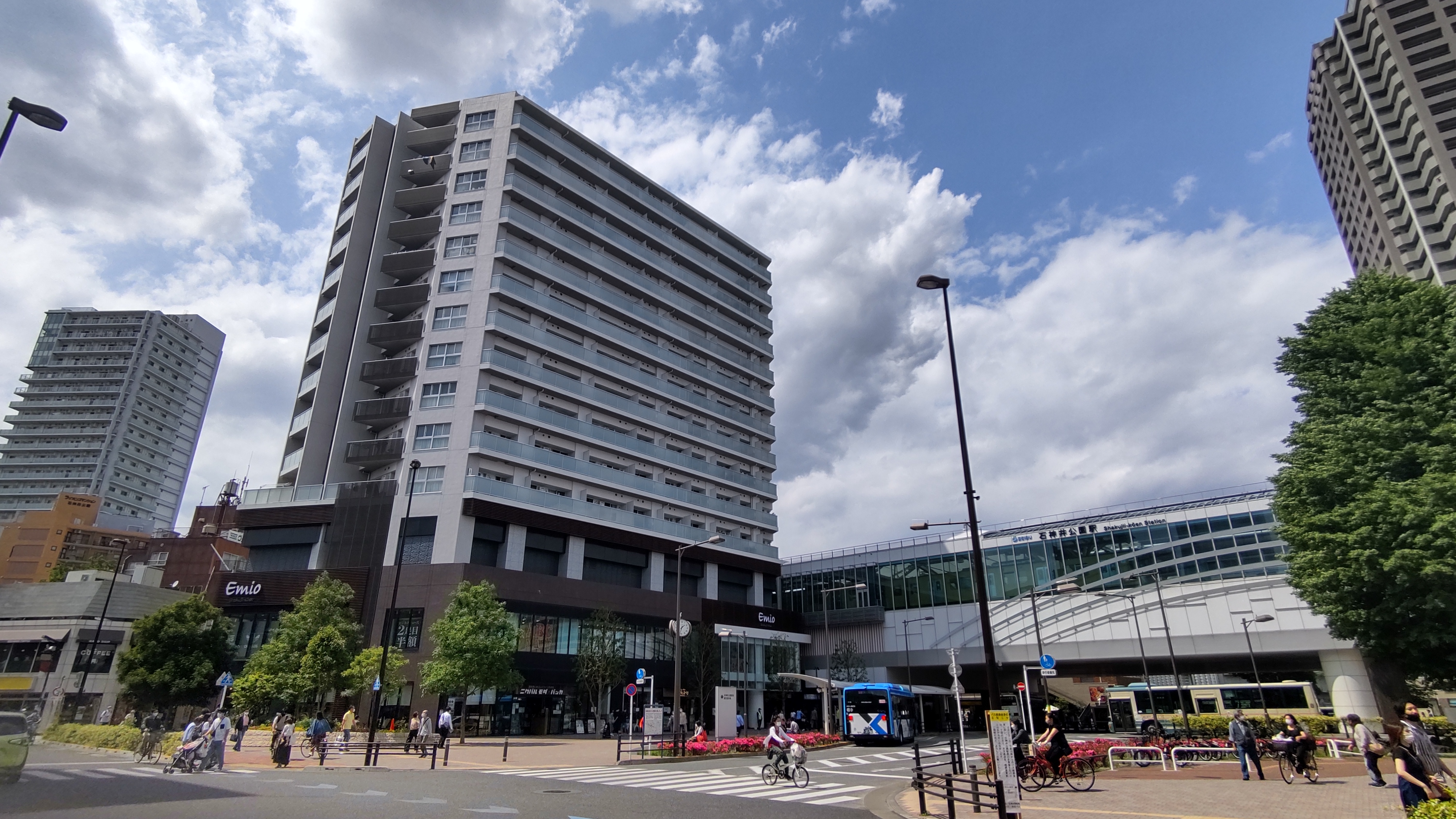
- Shakujii-kōen Station South Exit, May 2021

General information
- Location: 3-23-10 Shakujiimachi, Nerima, Tokyo （東京都練馬区石神井町3-23-10） Japan
- Operator: Seibu Railway
- Line: Seibu Ikebukuro Line
- Connections: Bus stop

Other information
- Station code: SI10

History
- Opened: April 15, 1915
- Former names: Shakujii (until 1933)

Passengers
- FY2013: 74,212 daily
Services
Preceding station	Seibu Railway	Following station
Hōya SI12 towards Kotesashi	S-Train (weekdays)	Iidabashi towards Toyosu
Tokorozawa SI17 towards Seibu-Chichibu	S-Train Weekends (Weekends and national holidays)	Ikebukuro towards Motomachi-Chūkagai
Hibarigaoka SI13 towards Hannō	F Liner	Nerima SI06 towards Motomachi-Chūkagai
Hibarigaoka SI13 towards Hannō	Ikebukuro Line Rapid Express (Note: The adjacent station for rapid express services bound for Motomachi-Chukagai via the Tokyo Metro Fukutoshin Line is Nerima.)	Ikebukuro SI01 Terminus
Hibarigaoka SI13 towards Hannō	Ikebukuro Line Express	Ikebukuro SI01 Terminus
Ōizumi-gakuen One-way operation	Ikebukuro Line Commuter Express	Ikebukuro SI01 Terminus
Hibarigaoka SI13 towards Hannō	Ikebukuro Line Rapid	Nerima SI06 towards Ikebukuro
Ōizumi-gakuen SI11 towards Hannō	Ikebukuro Line Semi Express	Nerima SI06 towards Ikebukuro
Ōizumi-gakuen SI11 towards Agano	Ikebukuro Line Local	Nerima-Takanodai SI09 towards Ikebukuro
Location

Shakujii-kōen Station (石神井公園駅, Shakujii-kōen-eki) is a railway station on the Seibu Ikebukuro Line in Nerima, Tokyo, Japan, operated by the private railway operator Seibu Railway.

== Lines ==
Shakujii-kōen Station is served by the Seibu Ikebukuro Line from Ikebukuro in Tokyo, with some services inter-running via the Tokyo Metro Yurakucho Line to Shin-Kiba and the Tokyo Metro Fukutoshin Line to Shibuya and onward via the Tokyu Toyoko Line and Minato Mirai Line to Motomachi-Chukagai. Located between Nerima-Takanodai and Ōizumi-gakuen, it is 10.6 km from the Ikebukuro terminus.

== Station layout ==
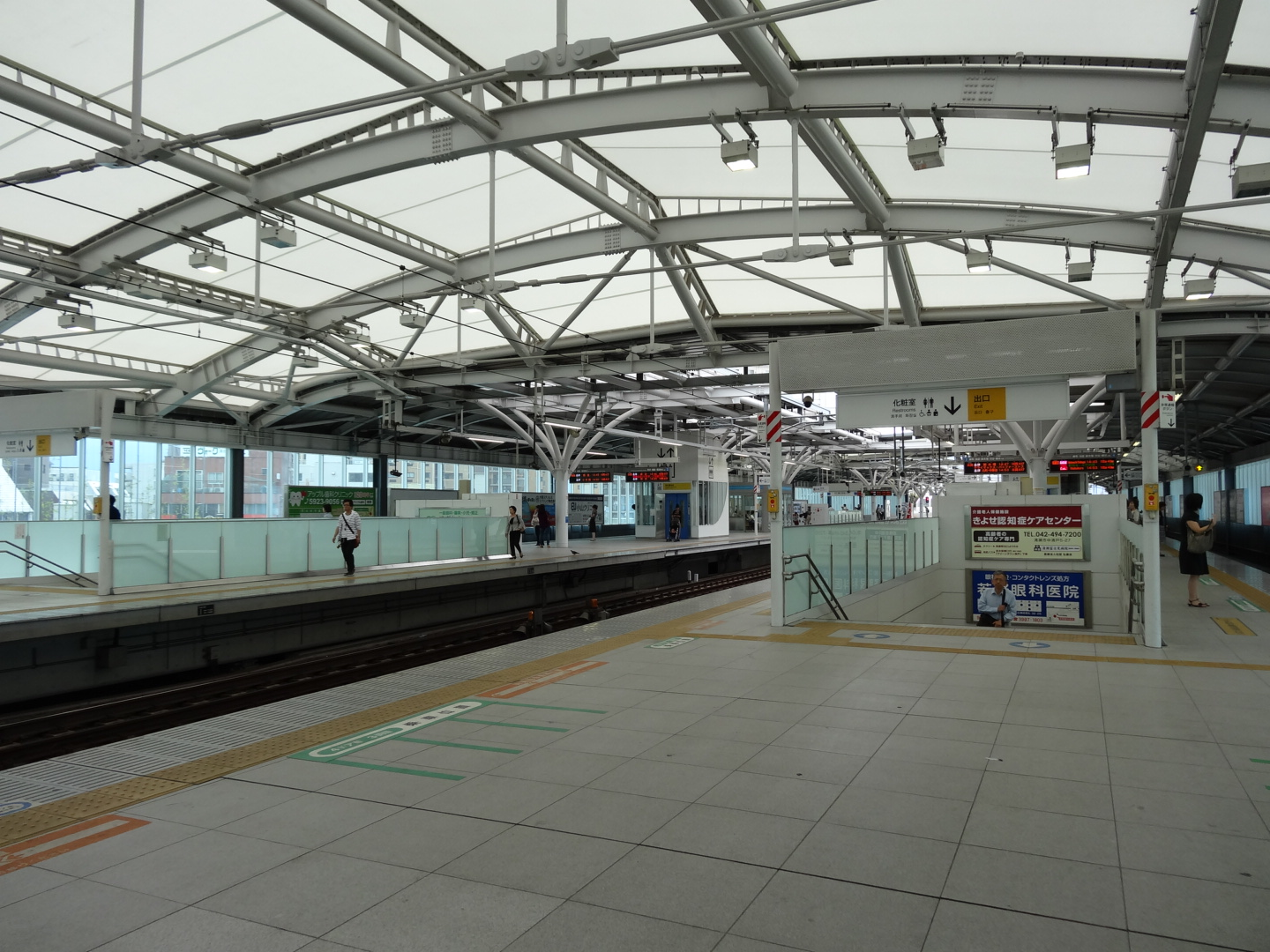

The station consists of two elevated island platforms serving four tracks.

=== Platforms ===
1/2	Seibu Ikebukuro Line	for Tokorozawa and Hannō
3/4	Seibu Ikebukuro Line	for Nerima and Ikebukuro; Tokyo Metro Yurakucho Line for Shin-Kiba; Tokyo Metro Fukutoshin Line for Shibuya; Tōkyū Tōyoko Line for Yokohama; Minatomirai Line for Motomachi-Chukagai

== History ==
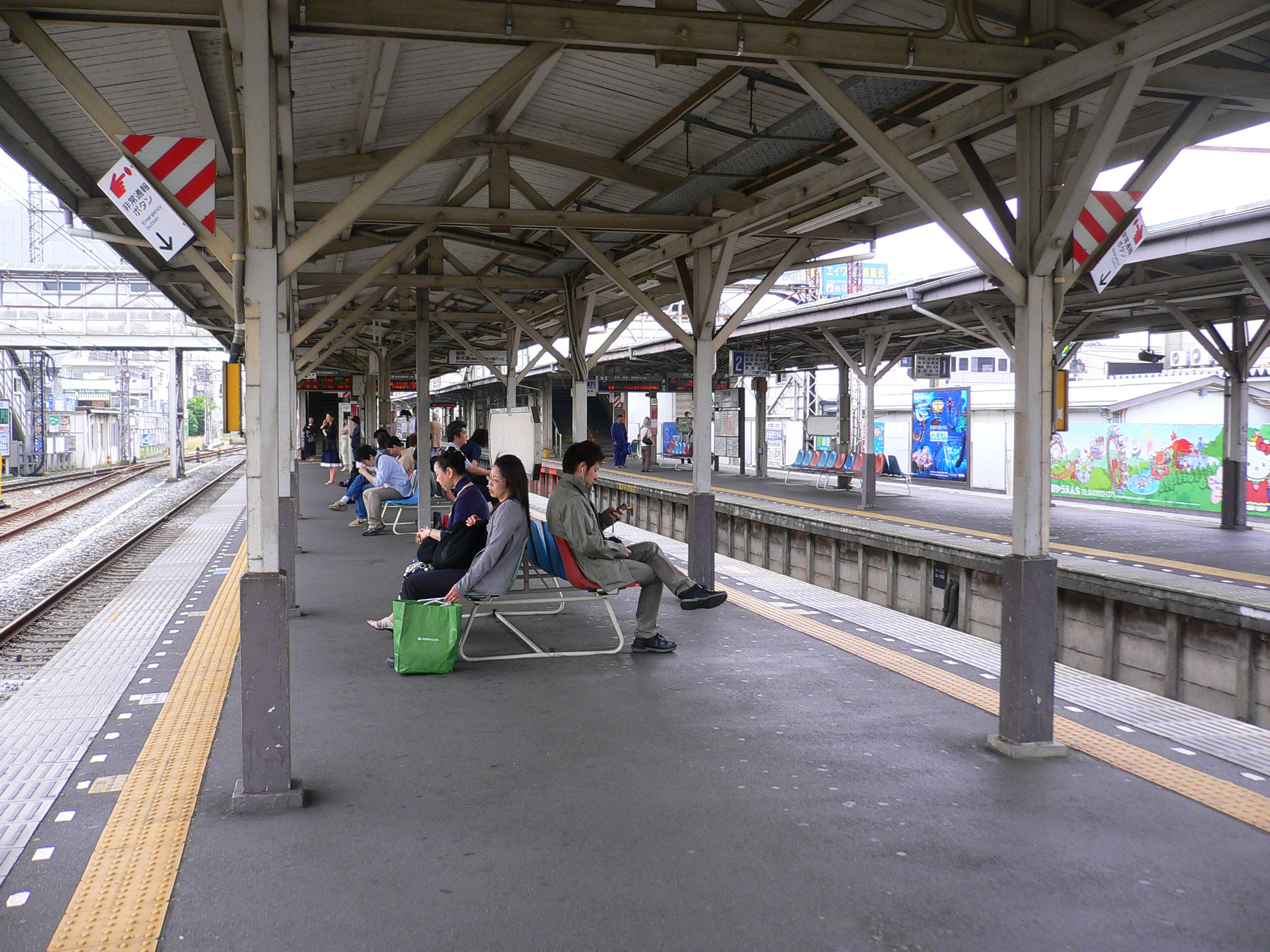
Original ground-level platforms, June 2006

The station first opened as Shakujii Station (石神井駅) on April 15, 1915, and was renamed Shakujii-kōen on March 1, 1933. The station was elevated on February 7, 2010 (platforms 3&4), April 17, 2011 (platform 2), and June 23, 2012 (platform 1).

Station numbering was introduced on all Seibu Railway lines during fiscal 2012, with Shakujii-kōen Station becoming "SI10".

Through-running to and from Yokohama and Motomachi-Chukagai via the Tokyu Toyoko Line and Minatomirai Line commenced on March 16, 2013.

== Passenger statistics ==
In fiscal 2013, the station was the 11th busiest on the Seibu network with an average of 74,212 passengers daily.

The passenger figures for previous years are as shown below.

Fiscal year	Daily average
2000	65,157
2009	70,043
2010	69,515
2011	68,820
2012	71,041
2013	74,212

== Surrounding area ==
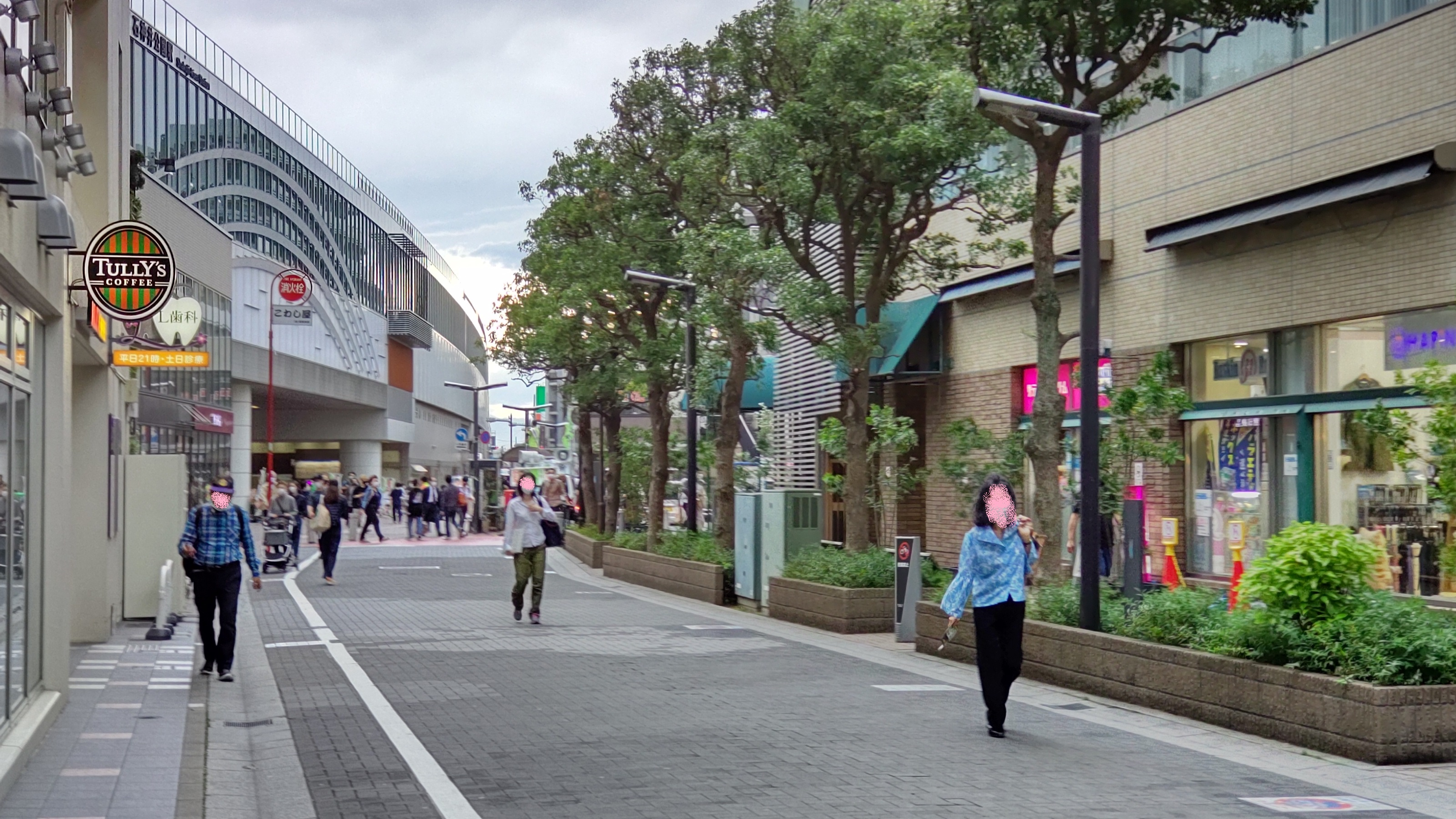
Peerless, May 2021

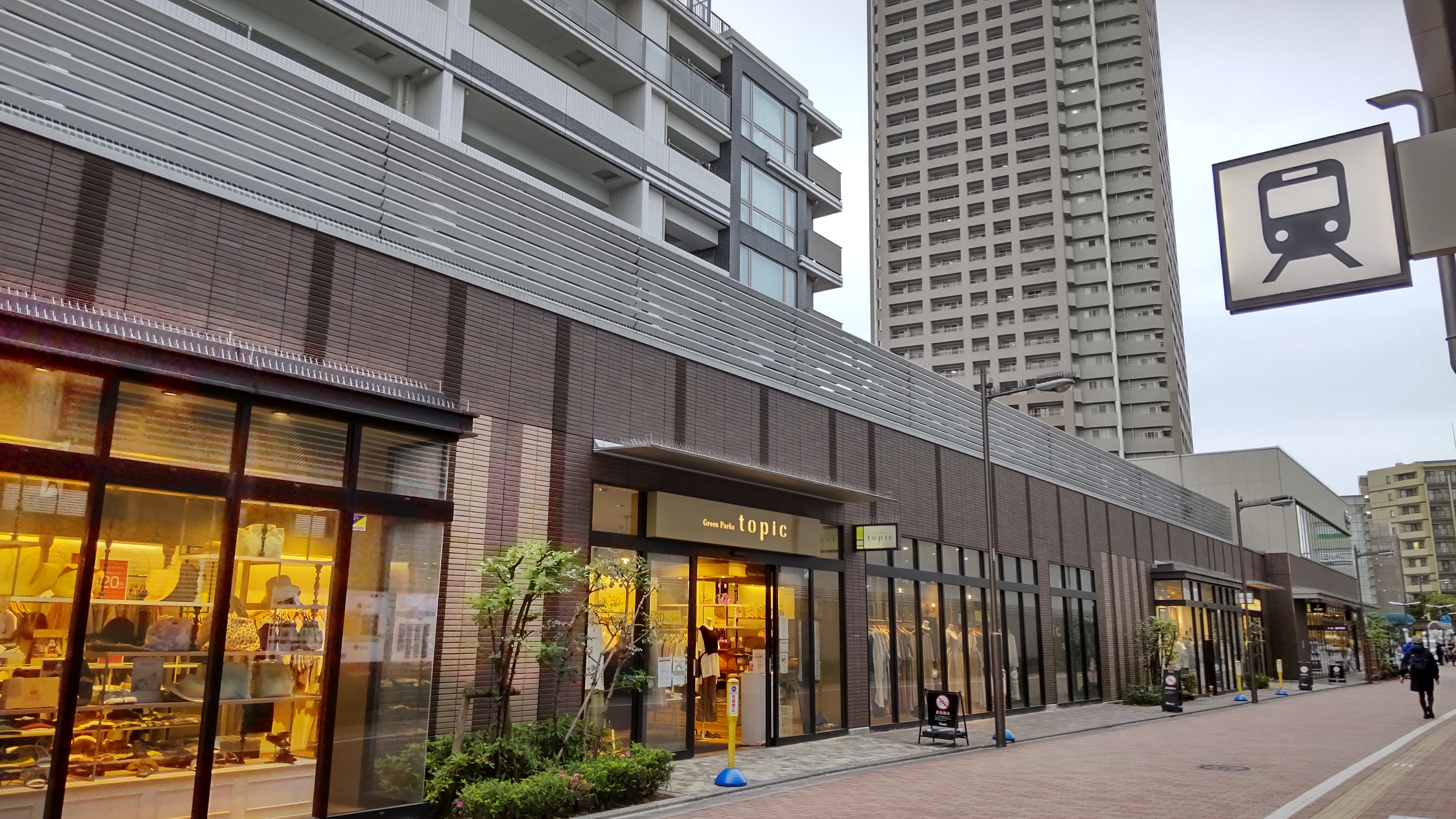
Emio North, May 2021

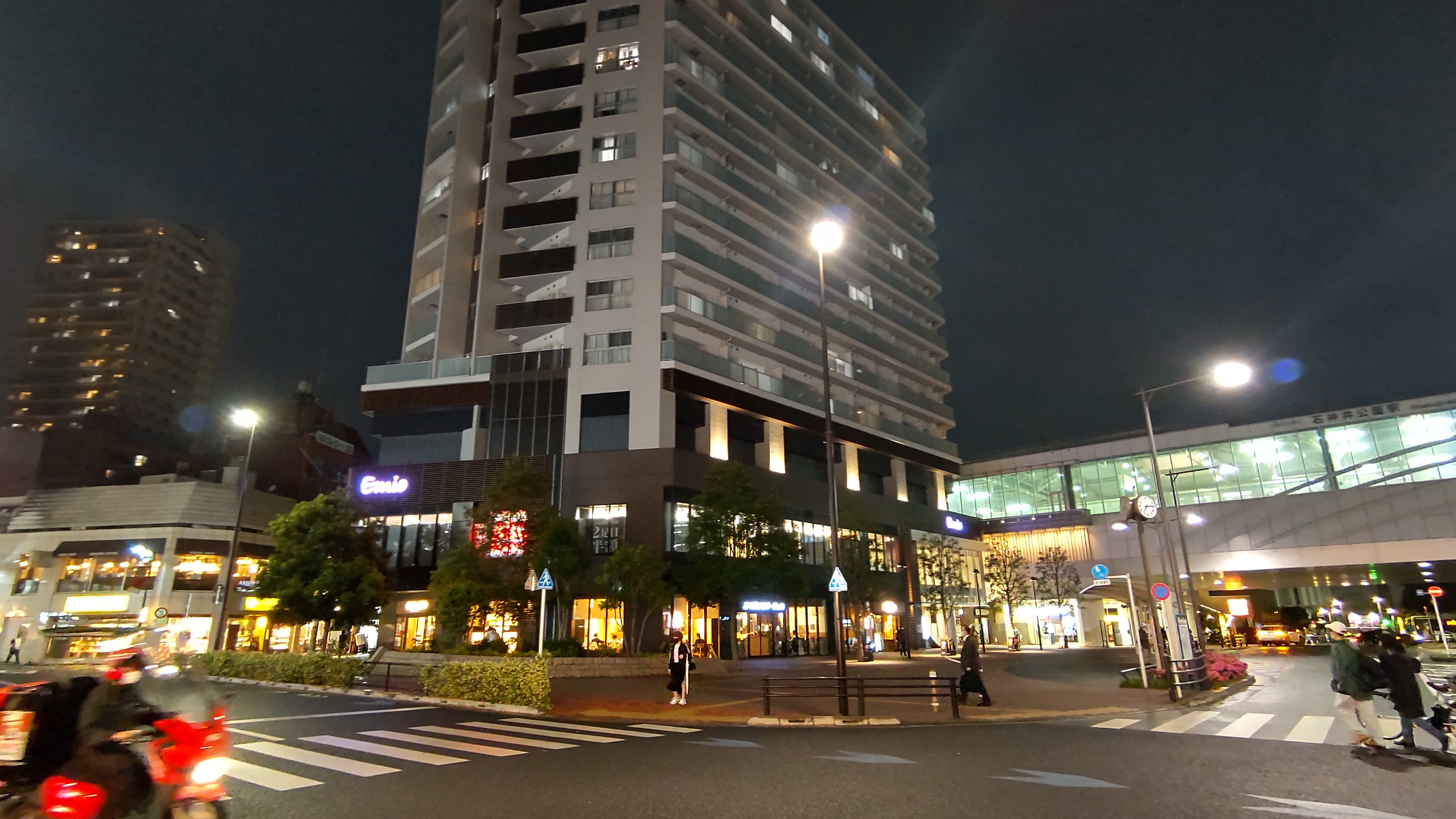
Shakujii-kōen Station South Exit, May 2021

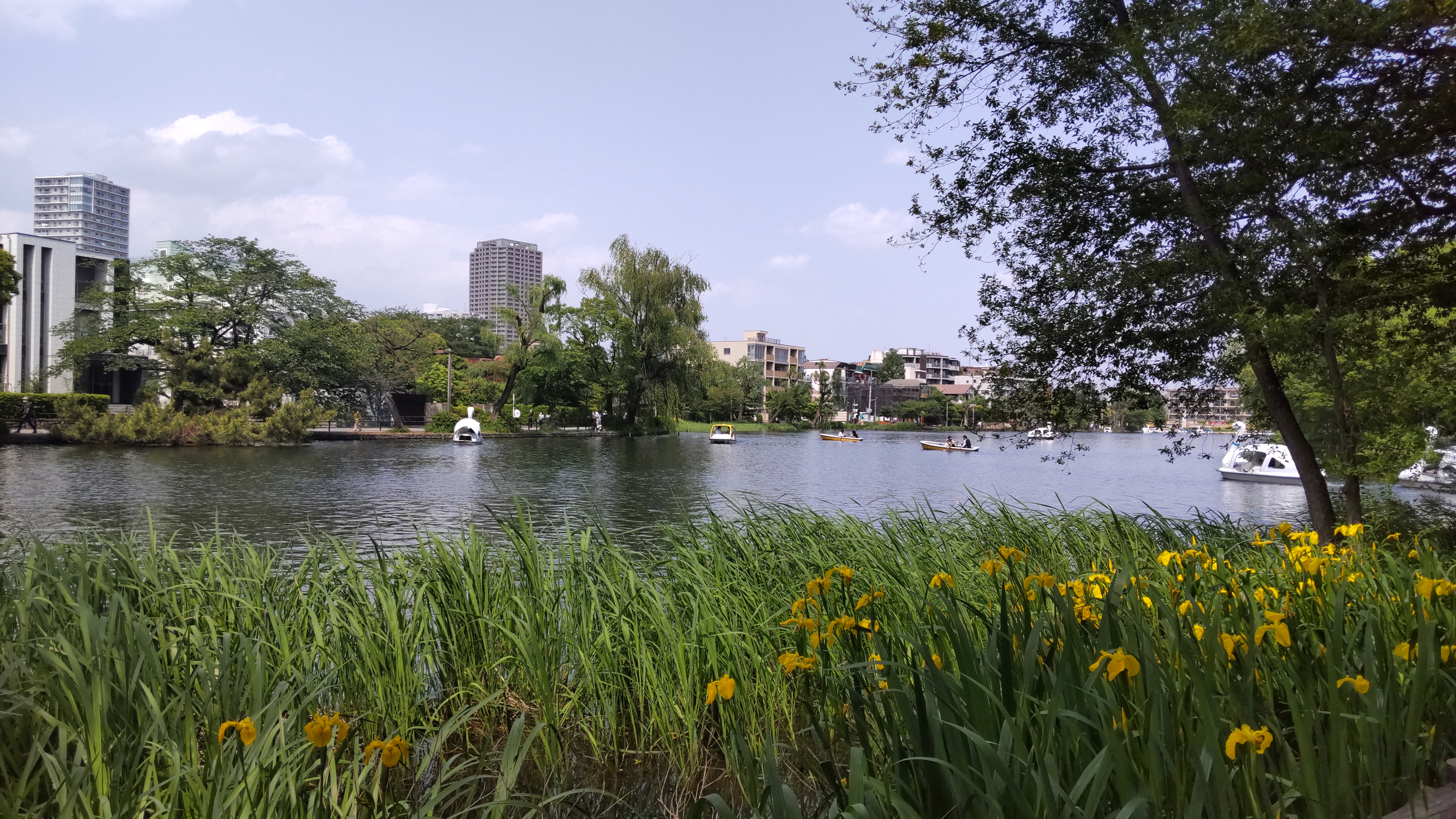
Shakujii Park

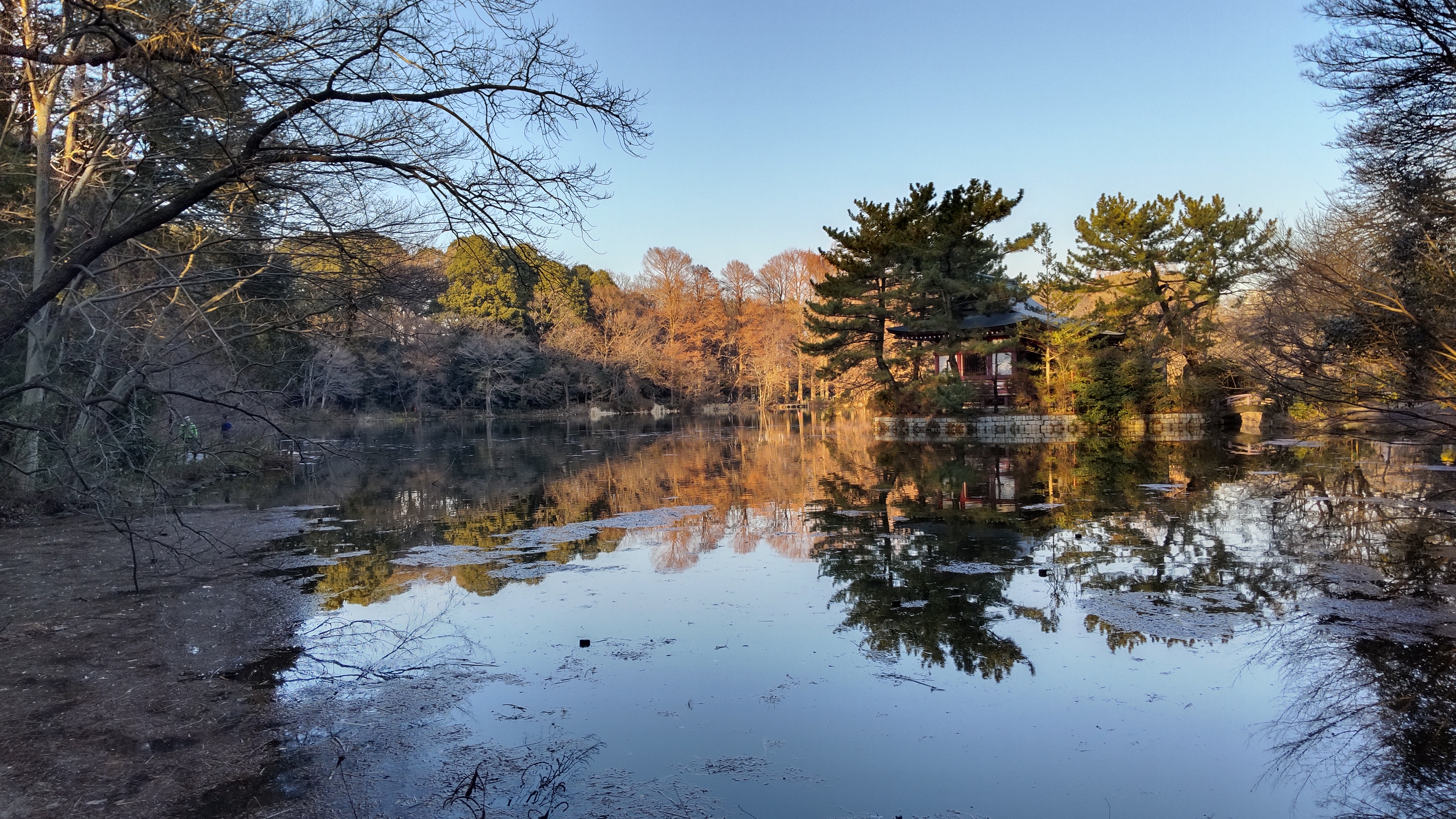
Shakujii Park

The roads around the station's south entrance are quite narrow and efforts have been made to encourage use of the north entrance, a larger, more open area where bus stops, parking, an Isetan supermarket, and bicycle racks are located. However, the south entrance, closer to residential areas, traditional shopping streets, and Shakujii Park (after which the station is named), continues to see greater use, the area around it being quite congested around rush hour times. On March 23, 2013 an additional west entrance was constructed opposite the original north and south entrances which have been collectively termed the "central entrance". Plans to expand this station plaza area have been included in upcoming track-laying construction projects.

An extensive commercial and housing area called "Eminade Shakujii-kōen" is expected to be completed by fiscal year 2015. Opening in three stages, the first stage of this project was opened on October 2, 2013, as "Emio Shakujii-kōen" at a cost of ¥900 million. Located largely towards the west exit and in close proximity to the station complex, it saw the opening of nineteen stores including a café, a general store, and the supermarket Ito Yokado. The second stage of the project, "Emio Shakujii-kōen East" is expected to be completed on August 21, 2014. This stage will see the opening of six stores comprising two fashion establishments (Muji and Buona Vita), an opticians and three catering establishments. Sections of the second stage comprising a daycare center, a pharmacist and a pet-care center were opened prior to the main section over the course of 2014.

Two bus terminals are located within Shakujii-kōen Station: "Shakujii-kōen Station North Entrance" and "Shakujii-kōen Station South Entrance". The terminals are served by: Seibu Bus, Airport Limousine, Kantō Bus and Kokusai Kōgyō Bus.

The bus services available from Shakujii-kōen Station as of August 2014 are displayed in the table below.

Service Number(s)	Destination	Operator(s)	Terminal
石02 石03 石04	Narimasu Station	Seibu Bus, Kokusai Kōgyō Bus	North
石01	Shakujii Circular	Seibu Bus, Kokusai Kōgyō Bus	North
吉60 石11 吉60-2	Narimasu-chō	Seibu Bus	North
吉60 吉60-2 吉60-3	Kichijōji Station	Seibu Bus	North
石11	Seibu bus garage	Seibu Bus	North
	Haneda Airport	Airport Limousine, Seibu Bus	North
荻14 石22	Ogikubo Station via Kami-Igusa Station	Seibu Bus	South
荻11 石21	Ogikubo Station via Iogi Station	Seibu Bus, Kantō Bus	Confederacy
阿50	Asagaya Station	Kantō Bus	South
