= Nerima Station =

Railway and metro station in Tokyo, Japan

Coordinates: 35°44′16″N 139°39′13″E

SI06 Nerima Station 練馬駅

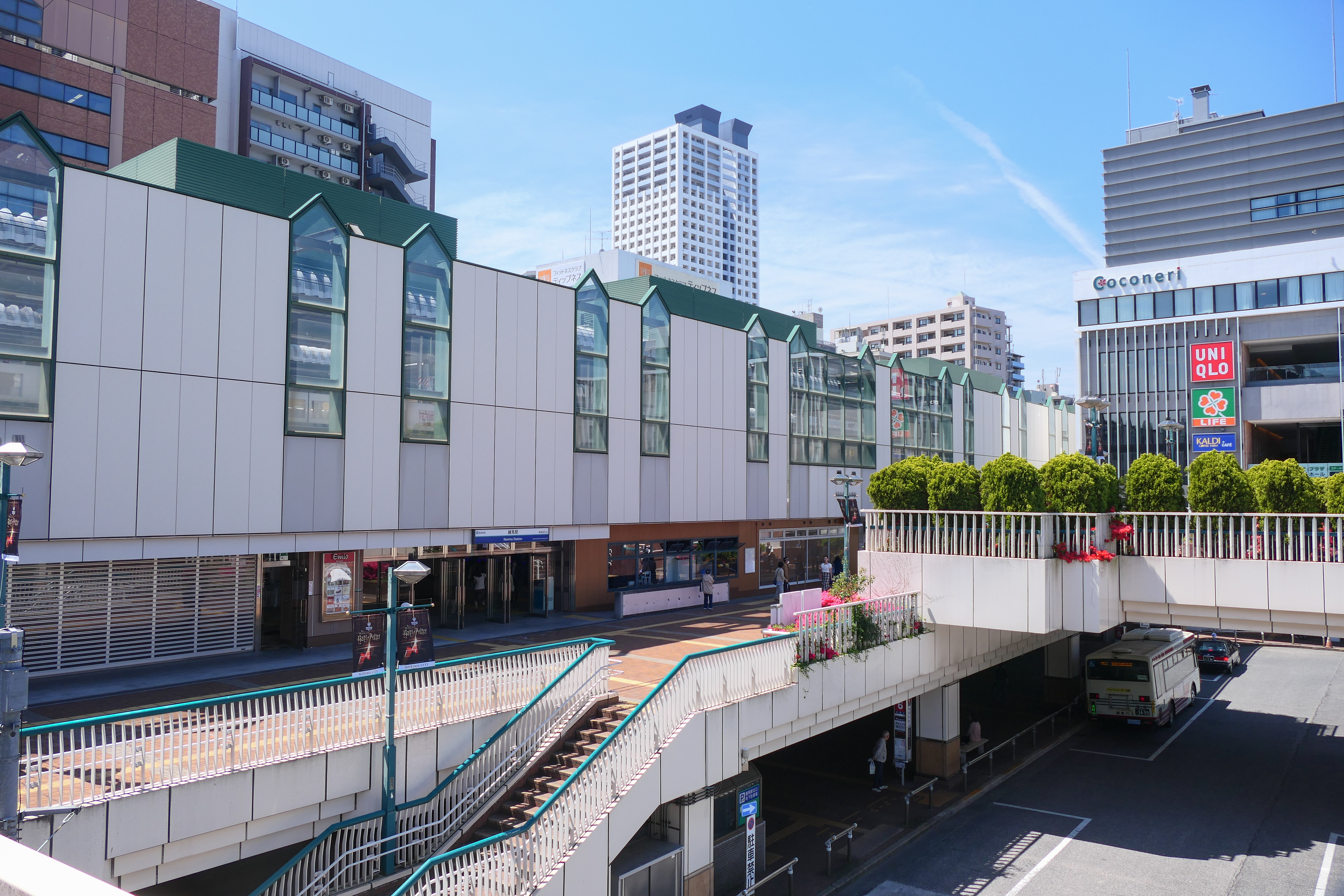
- The north entrance in April 2023

General information
- Location: 1-3-5 Nerima, Nerima, Tokyo （東京都練馬区練馬1-3-5） Japan
- Operator: Seibu Railway; Toei Subway
- Lines: Seibu Ikebukuro Line; Seibu Toshima Line; Seibu Yurakucho Line; Ōedo Line
- Platforms: 3 island platforms (2 for Seibu, 1 for Toei)
- Tracks: Seibu: 6 (2 non-stopping); Toei: 2
- Connections: Bus terminal

Construction
- Structure type: Elevated (Seibu), Underground (Toei)

Other information
- Station code: SI06 (Seibu); E-35 (Toei)

History
- Opened: 15 April 1915; 111 years ago

Passengers
- Seibu, FY2013, (Toei, FY2012): 118,601 (Seibu), 35,765 (Toei, boarding only) daily

Services
Preceding station	Seibu Railway	Following station
Shakujii-kōen SI10 towards Hannō	F Liner	Kotake-mukaihara SI37 towards Motomachi-Chūkagai
Shakujii-kōen SI10 towards Hannō	Ikebukuro Line Rapid	Ikebukuro SI01 Terminus
Ōizumi-gakuen One-way operation	Ikebukuro Line Commuter Semi Express	Ikebukuro SI01 Terminus
Shakujii-kōen SI10 towards Hannō	Ikebukuro Line Semi Express	Ikebukuro SI01 Terminus
Nakamurabashi SI07 towards Agano	Ikebukuro Line Local	Sakuradai SI05 towards Ikebukuro
through to Ikebukuro Line	Seibu Yūrakuchō Line Rapid Semi Express Local (Note: Rapid Express trains only stop at Nerima when branded as the F Liner service)	Shin-Sakuradai SI38 towards Kotake-mukaihara
Toshimaen SI39 Terminus	Toshima Line	through to Ikebukuro Line
Preceding station	Toei Subway	Following station
Toshimaen towards Hikarigaoka	Ōedo Line	Shin-egota towards Tochōmae
Location
- Location within Special wards of Tokyo Location within Tokyo Bay and Bōsō Peninsula Location within Tokyo Location within Japan

Nerima Station (練馬駅, Nerima-eki) is a railway station in Nerima, Tokyo, Japan, operated by the private railway operator Seibu Railway and the Tokyo subway operator Toei Subway.

== Lines ==
Nerima Station is served by the Seibu Ikebukuro Line, Seibu Yurakucho Line, and Seibu Toshima Line, and also by the Toei Ōedo Line subway. It is located 6.0 km (3.7 mi) from the terminus of the Ikebukuro Line at Ikebukuro.

== Station layout ==
Nerima is an elevated station with two island platforms serving four tracks, with an additional outer track on either side used by passing trains. Elevators and escalators connect the platforms to the ticket entrances, and the station contains a waiting room as well.

The Toei station consists of an underground island platform serving two tracks.

Nerima Station in western Tokyo is a busy commuter station on the Toei Oedo Line, the Seibu Ikebukuro Line and the Seibu Toshima Line.

=== Platforms ===
==== Seibu ====
1	Seibu Ikebukuro Line	for Tokorozawa, Hannō (from Seibu Yurakucho Line)
2	Seibu Ikebukuro Line	for Tokorozawa, Hannō (from Seibu Ikebukuro Line)
2	Seibu Toshima Line	for Toshimaen
3	Seibu Ikebukuro Line	for Ikebukuro
4	Seibu Yurakucho Line	for Kotake-mukaihara; Tokyo Metro Yurakucho Line for Shin-Kiba; Tokyo Metro Fukutoshin Line for Shibuya; Tokyu Toyoko Line for Yokohama; Minatomirai Line for Motomachi-Chukagai

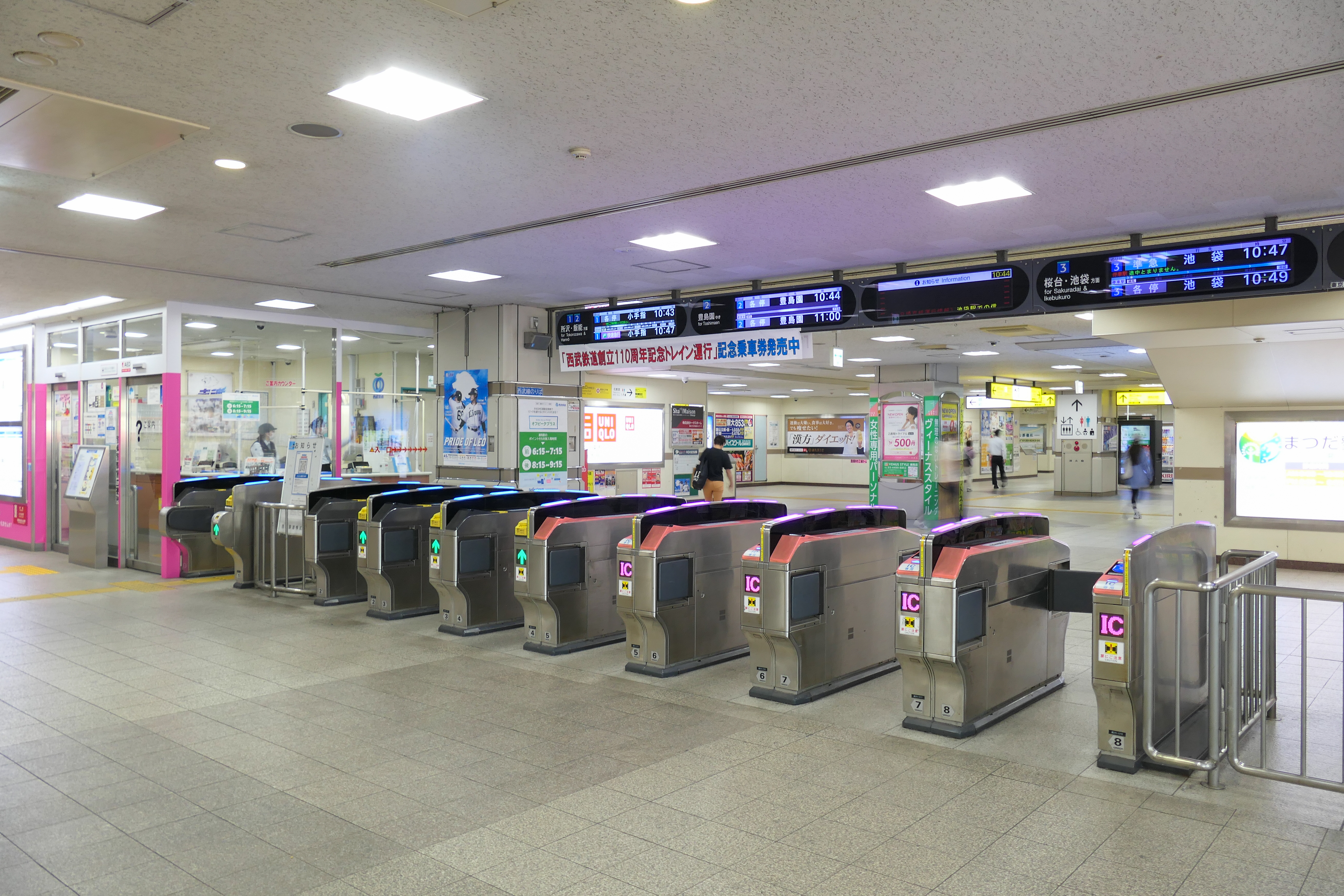
Ticket gates, 2023

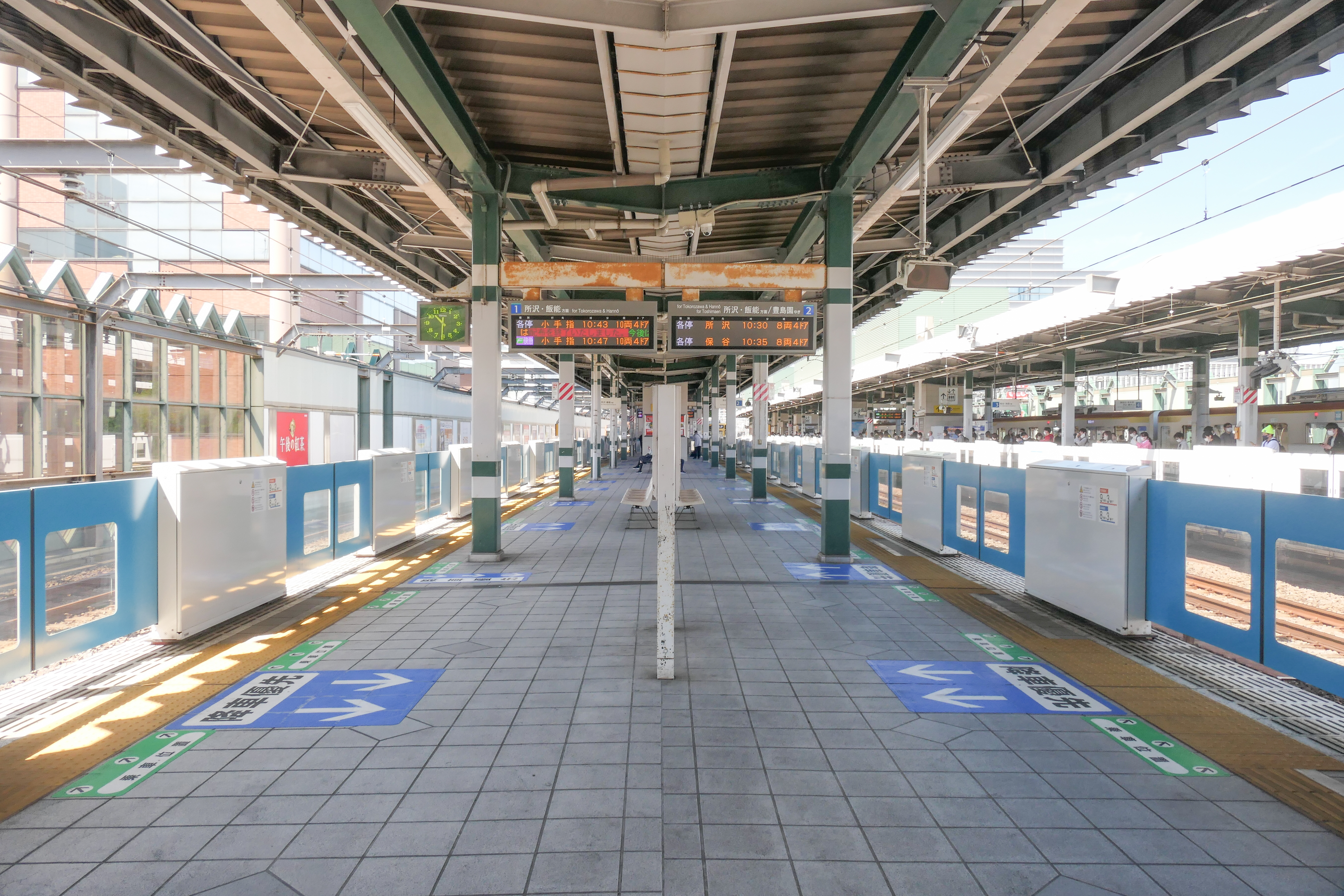
Platforms, 2023

==== Toei ====
1	Ōedo Line	for Tochōmae, Roppongi, and Daimon
2	Ōedo Line	for Hikarigaoka

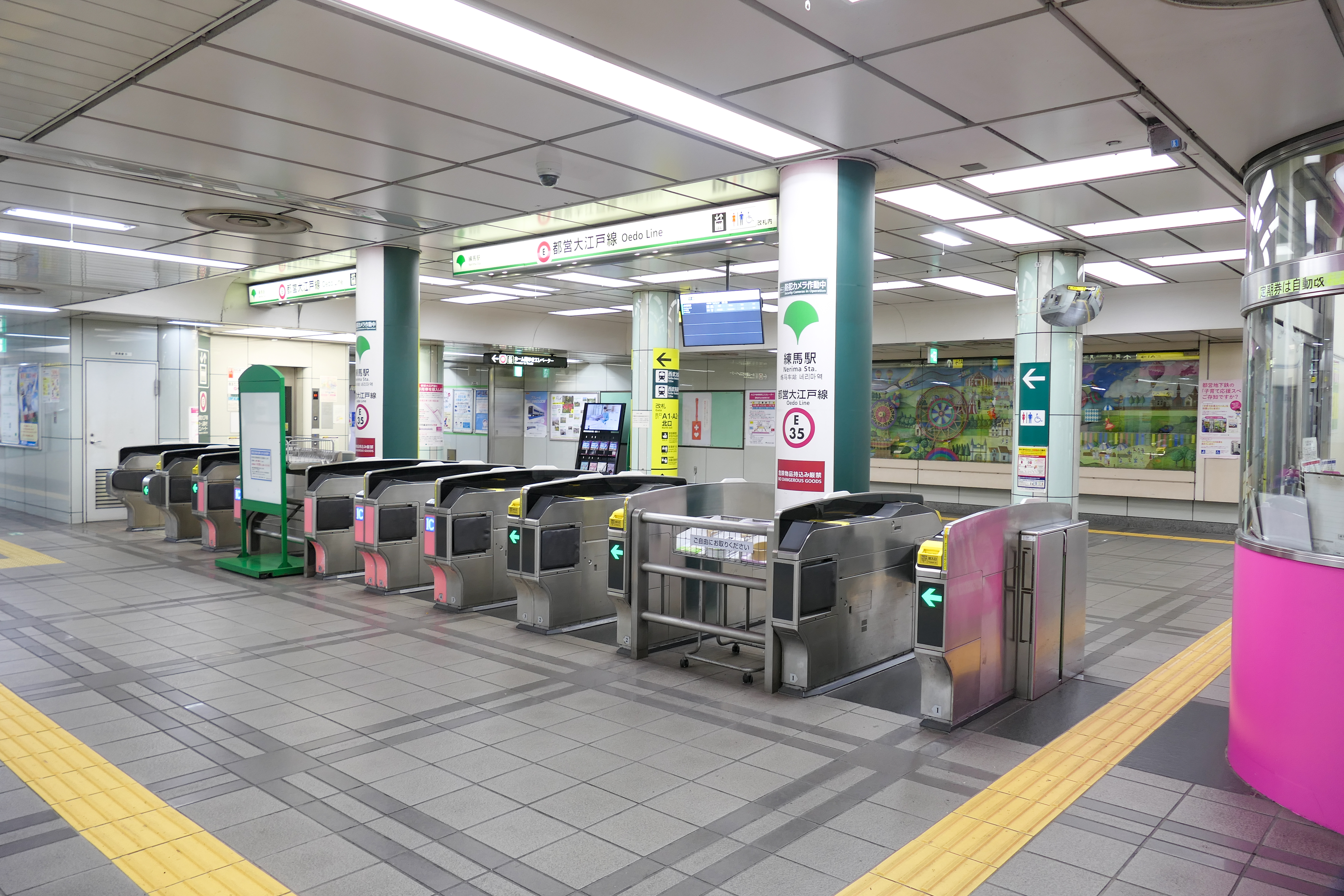
Toei ticket gates, 2023

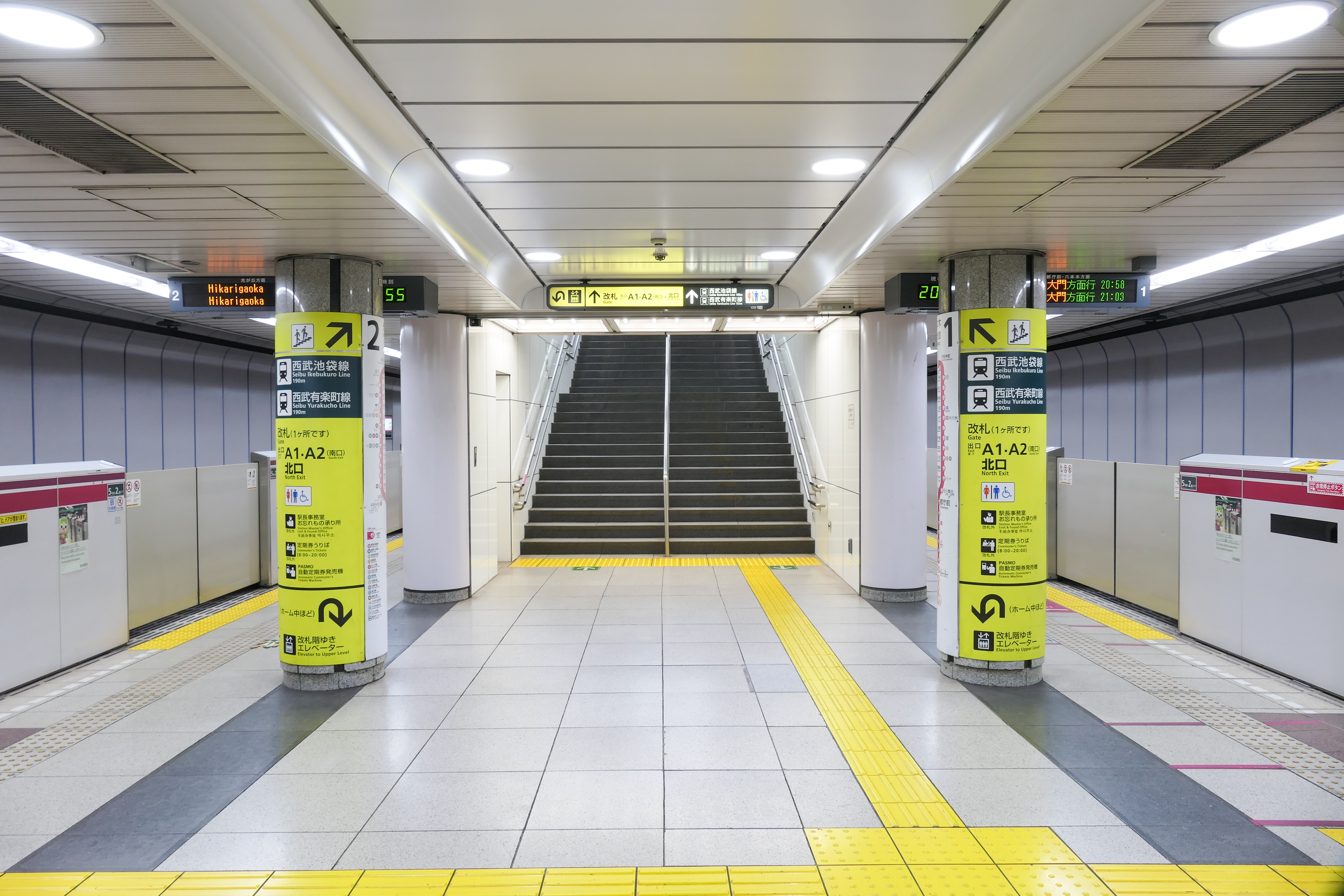
Toei Oedo Line underground platforms, March 2023

== History ==
The Seibu station opened on 15 April 1915. The Toei station opened on 10 December 1991.

The original ground-level station was rebuilt as an elevated station in 1997, and at the same time, the number of tracks was increased to six to allow non-stop trains to pass.

From 1998, inter-running of some services commenced to and from the Seibu Yurakucho Line.

Station numbering was introduced on all Seibu Railway lines during fiscal 2012, with Nerima Station becoming "SI06".

Through-running to and from Yokohama and Motomachi-Chukagai via the Tokyu Toyoko Line and Minatomirai Line commenced on 16 March 2013.

== Passenger statistics ==
In fiscal 2013, the station was the fourth busiest on the Seibu network with an average of 118,601 passengers daily. In fiscal 2012, the Toei station was used by an average of 35,765 passengers daily (boarding passengers only). The passenger figures for the Seibu station in previous years are as shown below.

Fiscal year	Daily average
2000	70,403
2009	100,760
2010	109,231
2011	109,306
2012	113,851
2013	118,601

== Cultural references ==
The station and other parts of the Toei Ōedo Line are referenced in the Digimon Adventure franchise.

== See also ==
- List of railway stations in Japan
