= Shirakami =

Shirakami can refer to:

- Cape Shirakami, cape in Hokkaido Prefecture, Japan
- Mount Shirakami, mountain in Hyogo Prefecture, Japan
- Shirakami Fubuki, Hololive VTuber and singer
- Shirakami-Sanchi, mountain range in the Tohoku region, Japan
  - Akita Shirakami Prefectural Natural Park in Akita Prefecture
  - Tsugaru Shirakami Prefectural Natural Park in Aomori Prefecture
