= Kannai =

District in Yokohama, Japan

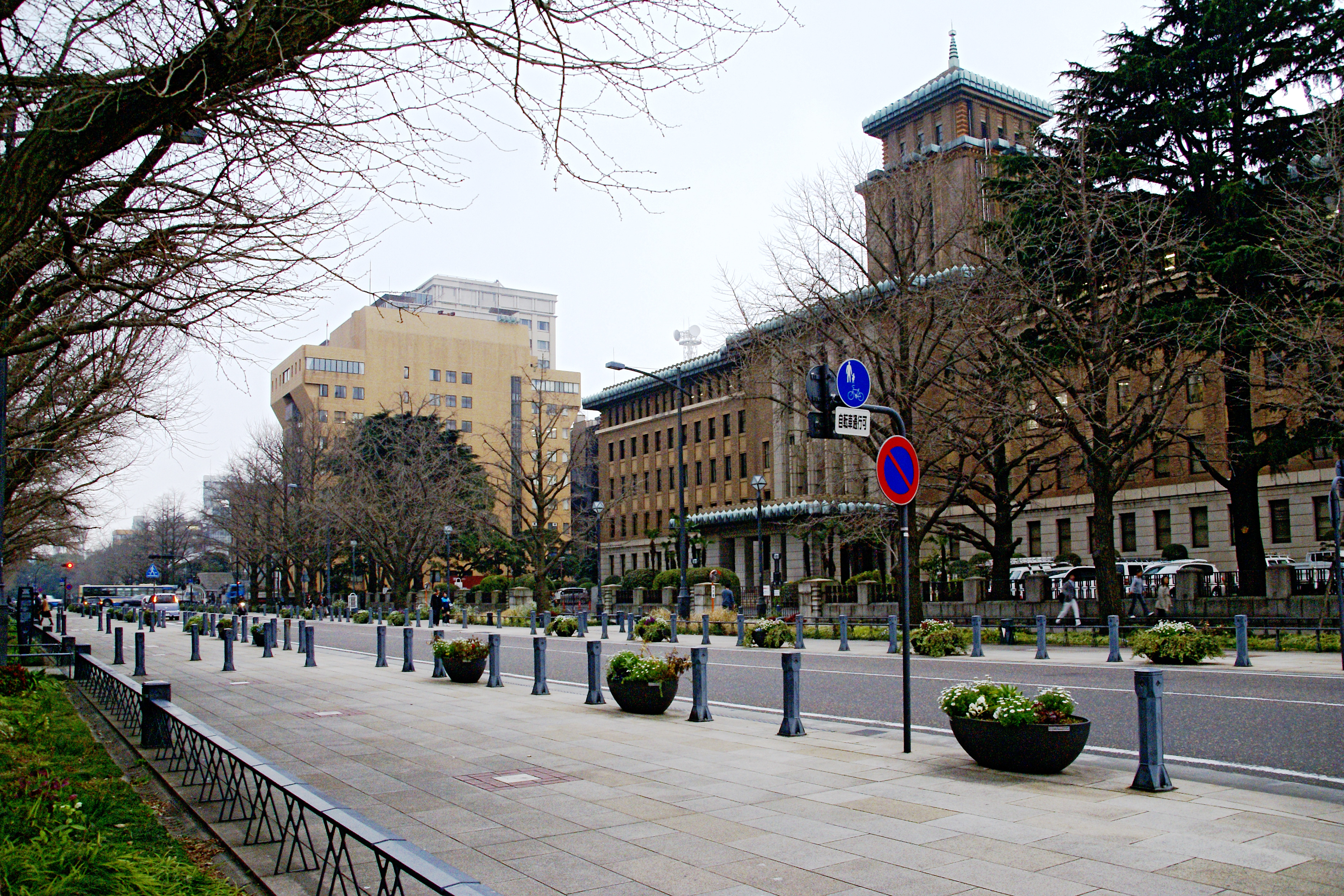
Kanagawa Prefectural Offices, Kannai, Yokohama

Kannai (関内) is a district in Naka Ward, Yokohama, Japan, bounded by the Ōoka River, JR Negishi Line, Nakamura River, and Yokohama waterfront. "Kannai" is not an official name of the area, but the common term of reference has been in use for over a century.

Kannai is the heart of administrative and commercial Yokohama, with the Kanagawa Prefectural Government offices, the Yokohama Municipal Government offices, Kanagawa Prefectural Police Headquarters, other governmental offices as well as major business offices within its borders.

Kannai encompasses the old districts of Bashamichi, Chinatown, and Yamashita Park, making Kannai a major tourist destination in Yokohama, rivaling the adjacent Minato Mirai 21.

== History ==
The Kannai region was part of the ocean until the Edo period when Yoshida Shinden was reclaimed in 1667. Upon reclamation, the streets were lined up according to a grid plan. And towns (町, machi) in the region were auspiciously named after individuals involved with the reclamation, Noh songs, and Hyakunin Isshu, rather than any ancient names.

During the Edo period, Yokohama-mura (横浜村, lit. side beach village) was a remote village adjacent to the Kanagawa-juku (神奈川宿), one of the 53 stations of Tōkaidō. Upon being demanded by the United States, the Tokugawa shogunate declared Yokohama-mura to be a part of Kanagawa and then opened its port. The Tokugawa government chose the remotely located Yokohama-mura, to prevent foreigners from entering the bustling Kanagawa-juku.

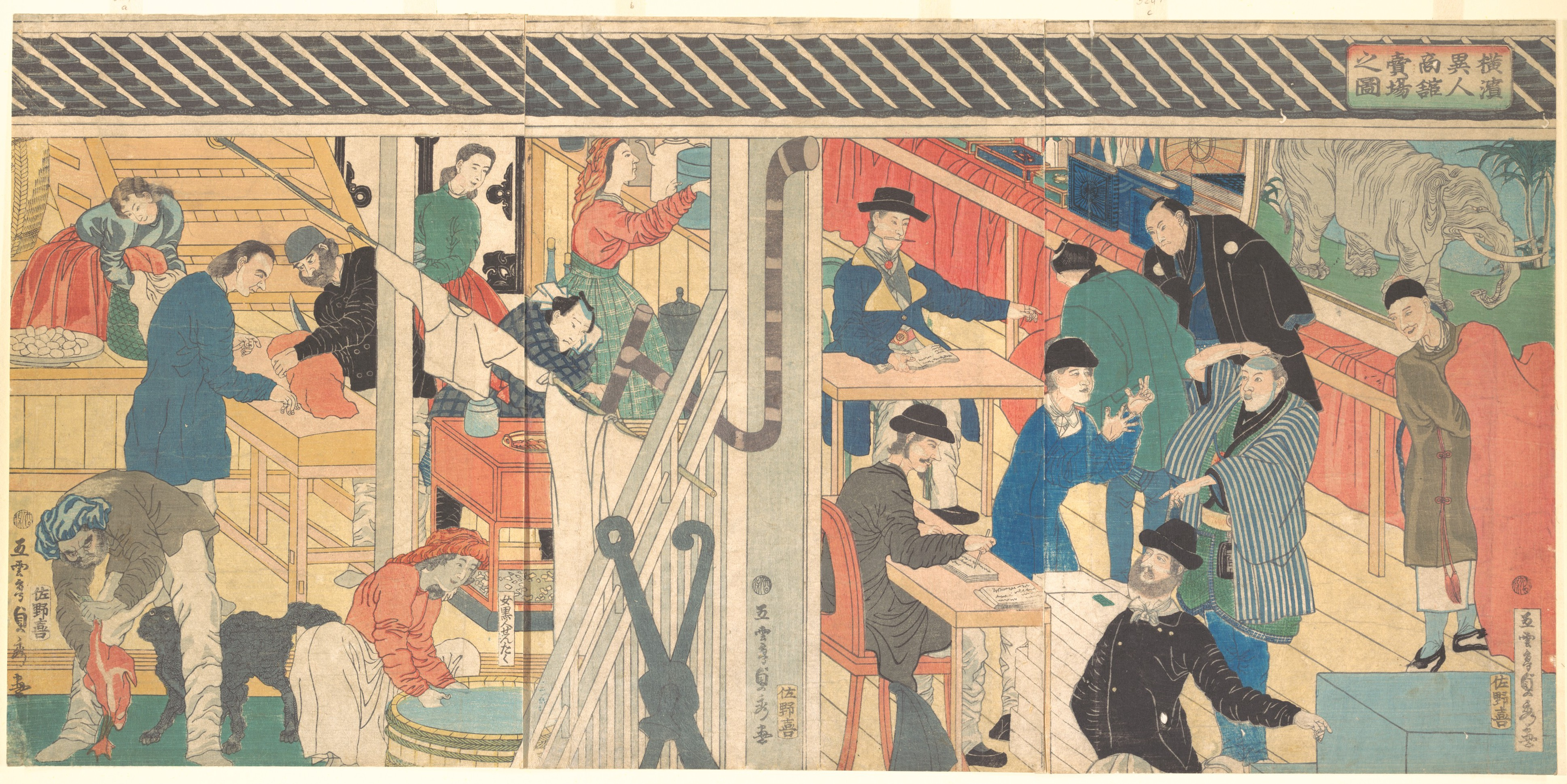
Foreign traders in the Yokohama foreign settlement

Upon the opening of the Port of Yokohama in 1859, Kannai became the commercial center of the foreign settlement and home of international trading companies and diplomatic missions, similar to Dejima in Nagasaki. As the foreign settlement rapidly expanded, further residential areas, churches, a cemetery and schools were added on the nearby elevated Yamate Bluff overlooking the harbour. The historic Osanbashi Pier was built adjacent to Kannai in 1894, and has been the international pier of the Port of Yokohama ever since.

Since the opening of the Port of Yokohama, Kannai saw a sudden influx of Western culture. According to the Yokohama Municipal Government, the Kannai region boasts many "firsts in Japan", such as ice cream, beer, and gas lamps.

A road was built from Kanagawa-juku to Yokohama-mura. And on this road, the Yoshida Bridge was built across Yoshida River, a branch of the Ōoka River. There was a Kanmon (関門), a "checkpoint", on this Yoshida Bridge. The area inside the Kanmon (the Yokohama side) was called Kannai (Kannai meant "inside the Kanmon"). Within Kannai, the current location of the Kanagawa prefectural office marked the boundary between the Japanese settlement area on the west, and the foreign settlement area on the east.

In 1860, canals were built in addition to the existing rivers, so that Kannai was completely surrounded by water. There was a Kanmon placed on each bridge, to restrict access, and to prevent contact between samurai and foreigners. The samurai were not allowed into Kannai.

After subsequent modernizations over the years, the Kanmon lost its significance, and was eventually removed. However, even after the abolishment of the Kanmon, the name Kannai (which originally meant "inside the Kanmon") remains popular to this day.

Examples of modern western architecture built in the 1920s and 1930s still remain in Kannai. Buildings of note include:

- The Yokohama Archives of History housed partly in the former British Consulate building constructed in 1931.

== Kannai today ==
Today, Shuto Expressway and Ōdōri Park occupy the former location of the Yoshida River. The bridge has become part of the road. And a stone monument is all that remains to show the location of the bridge and the river.

Today, Bashamichi Street adjoins Yoshida Bridge with the former settlement area of Kannai. On the other side of Yoshida Bridge is Isezakichō. The vicinity of Isezakicho was outside the Kanmon, and was called Kangai (関外) (meaning "outside the Kanmon"). Today, the name "Kangai" has lost its currency, while "Kannai" remains in popular use. The JR Kannai Station is based on this name.

The Kannai district has seen a revival after the inauguration of the Minatomirai Line in 2004, with better connections to the popular Yokohama Station and Minato Mirai 21 regions.

In recent years, due to a change in societal and economic conditions, old office and store buildings are being torn down, in favor of new condominiums; and this has presented challenges for city planning.

== Train stations ==
- Kannai Station (Keihin-Tōhoku Line—Negishi Line, Blue Line (Yokohama))
- Ishikawachō Station (Keihin-Tōhoku Line—Negishi Line)
- Bashamichi Station (Minatomirai Line)
- Nihon-ōdōri Station (Minatomirai Line)
- Motomachi-Chūkagai Station (Minatomirai Line)

== See also ==
- Yokohama
- Osanbashi Pier
- Yokohama Marine Tower
- Yokohama Silk Museum
- Isezakichō
