= Nakamura River =

Nakamura River may refer to the following rivers in Japan:

- Nakamura River (Aomori), river in Aomori Prefecture
- Nakamura River (Yokohama), river in Yokohama, Kanagawa
