= Akita Shirakami Prefectural Natural Park =

Natural park of Akita prefecture, Japan

- 秋田白神県立自然公園
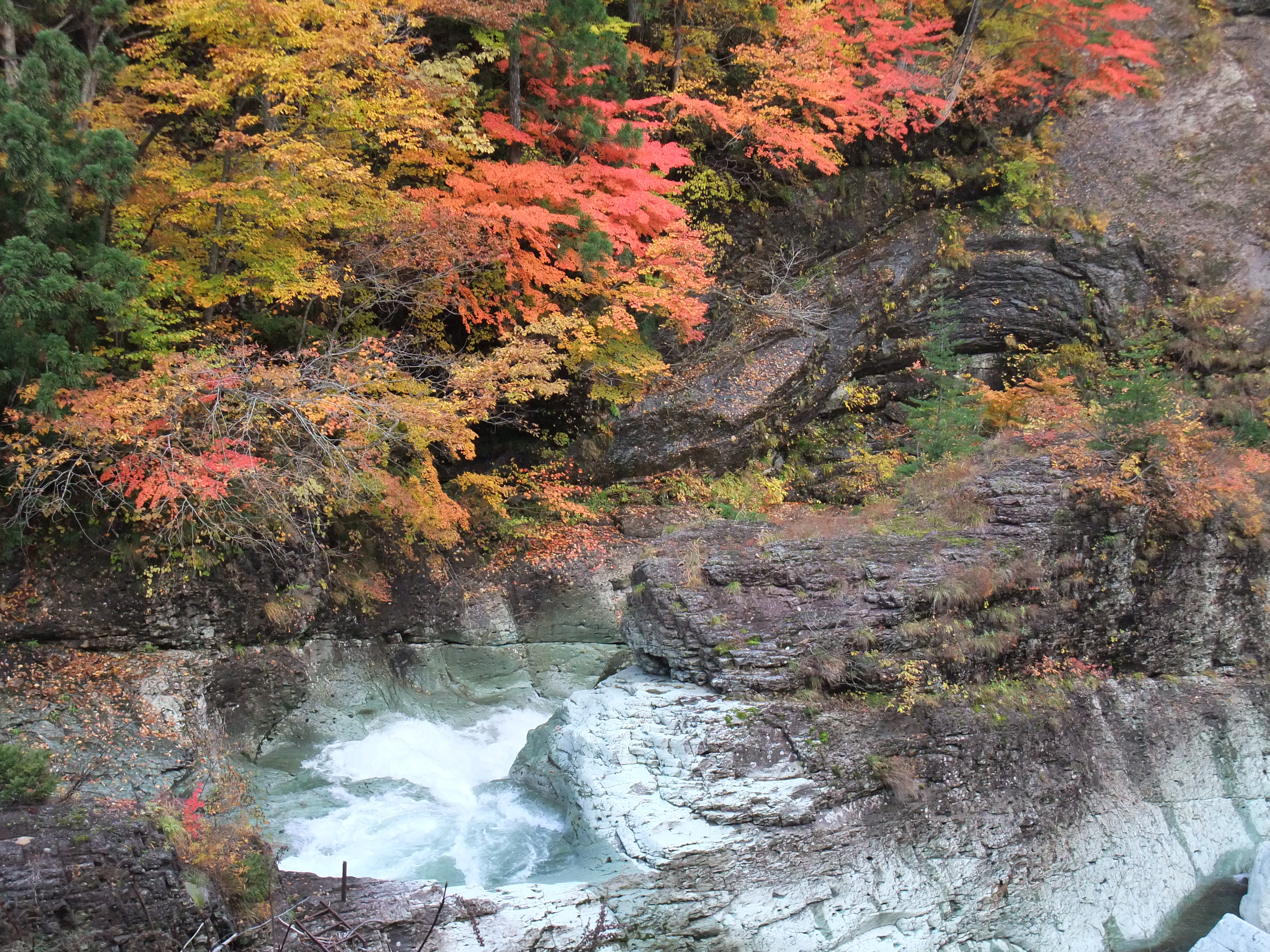
- Daira Valley
- Interactive map of Akita Shirakami Prefectural Natural Park
- Location: Akita Prefecture, Japan
- Coordinates: 40°25′N 140°07′E
- Area: 62.75 km^{2} (24.23 sq mi)
- Established: 24 August 2004

Akita Shirakami Prefectural Natural Park (秋田白神県立自然公園, Akita Shirakami kenritsu shizen kōen) is a Prefectural Natural Park in Akita Prefecture, Japan. Established in 2004, the park spans the borders of the municipalities of Fujisato and Happō, and takes its name from the Shirakami-Sanchi.

Shirakami Sanchi is a mountainous region that contains one of Japan's untouched beech forests. Natural Park has two separate zones. One is internal, untouched in the heart of the region and it is part of the protected nature under the auspices of UNESCO and a larger external buffer zone, in which tourist visits are allowed.

== See also ==
- National Parks of Japan
- Parks and gardens in Akita Prefecture
