= Kurokuma Falls =

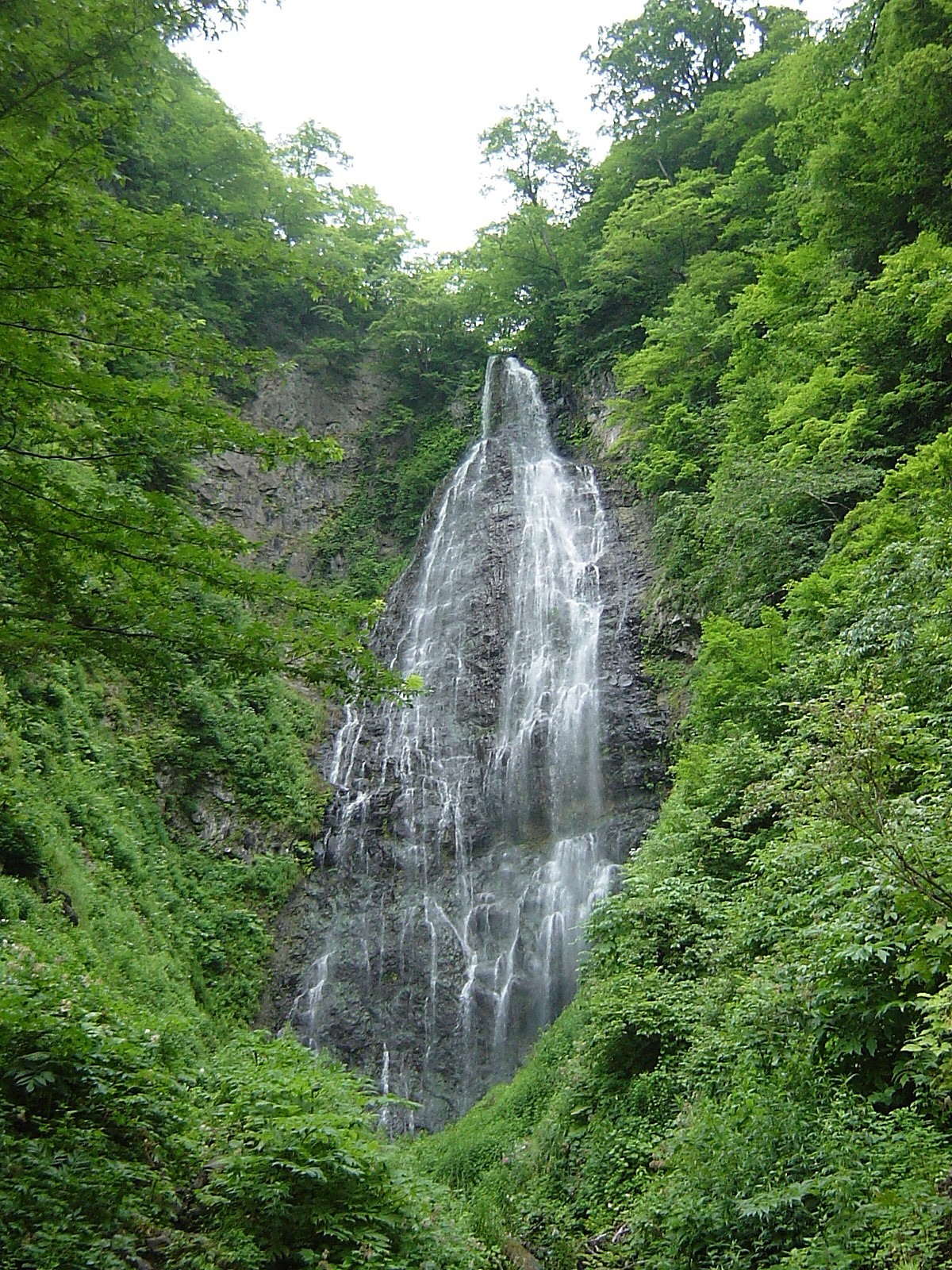

- Location within Japan
- Location: Ajigasawa, Aomori Prefecture, Japan
- Coordinates: 40°37′46.2″N 140°6′37.7″E
- Type: multi-step
- Total height: 85 m (279 ft)
- Average width: 15 m (49 ft)
- Watercourse: Akaishi River

Kurokuma Falls (くろくまの滝, Kurokuma-no-taki) is a waterfall in the town of Ajigasawa, Higashitsugaru District Aomori Prefecture, Japan, on a tributary of the Akaishi River, which flows down from the World Heritage Site Shirakami Mountains. It is one of "Japan’s Top 100 Waterfalls", in a listing published by the Japanese Ministry of the Environment in 1990.

The shape of the falls is thought to resemble an image of Kannon Bosatsu with hands clasped in prayer, which led the waterfall to be regarded as an object of religious veneration. However, the falls are also thought to resemble a standing bear, hence the literal translation of its name as “Black Bear Falls”.

== See also ==
- List of waterfalls
- List of waterfalls in Japan
