= Nakamura River (Yokohama) =

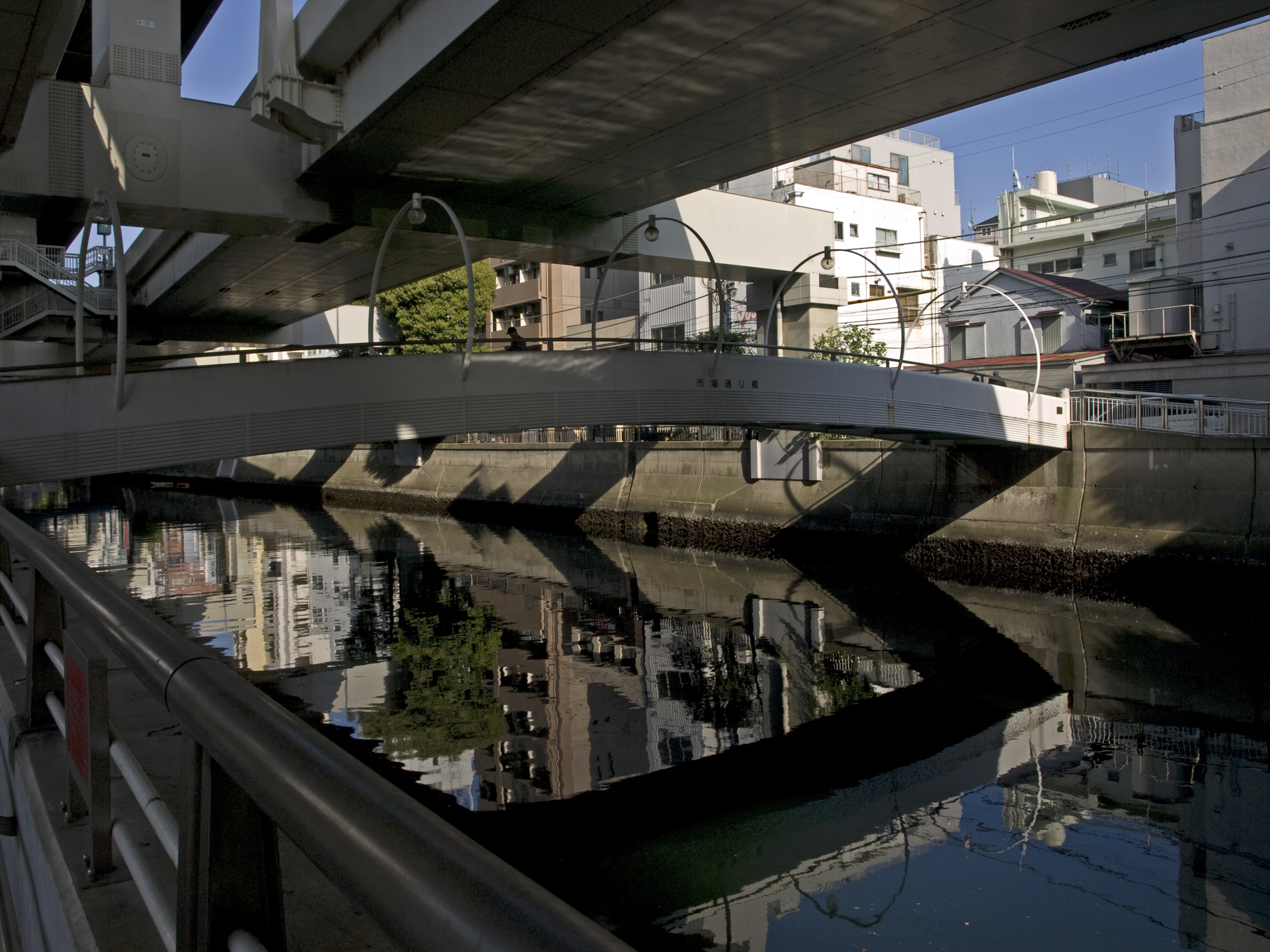

- Location within Japan
- Native name: 中村川 (Japanese)

Location
- Country: Japan
- Region: Tōhoku
- Prefecture: Kanagawa
- Cities and towns: Yokohama

Physical characteristics
- Source: Ōoka River
  - location: Minami-ku, Yokohama
- Mouth: Tokyo Bay
  - location: Naka-ku, Yokohama
  - coordinates: 35°17′18.28″N 139°14′21.98″E

The Nakamura River (中村川, Nakamura-gawa) is a river that flows from Minami-ku to Naka-ku in Yokohama, Kanagawa, Japan.

== History ==
Until the early Edo period, the lowland between the Nakamura River and the main stream of the Ōoka River was a bell-shaped cove that connects to the sea near what is now Sakuragicho, and was then reclaimed to become Yoshida Nitta. The Nakamura River (upstream except the Hori River) is a river created at the southern end of Yoshida Nitta. It was connected to several rivers in Shindenuchi, but these rivers were reclaimed from the Meiji era to the postwar period, leaving only the Nakamura River.

The eastern part of Kannai was originally a sandbar extending from the south side. In 1860 (the year after the opening of Port of Yokohama), the current Horikawa was excavated as a canal, and Kannai was separated from the surrounding area by a waterway.
