= Nishimeya =

Nishimeya 西目屋村
- Village
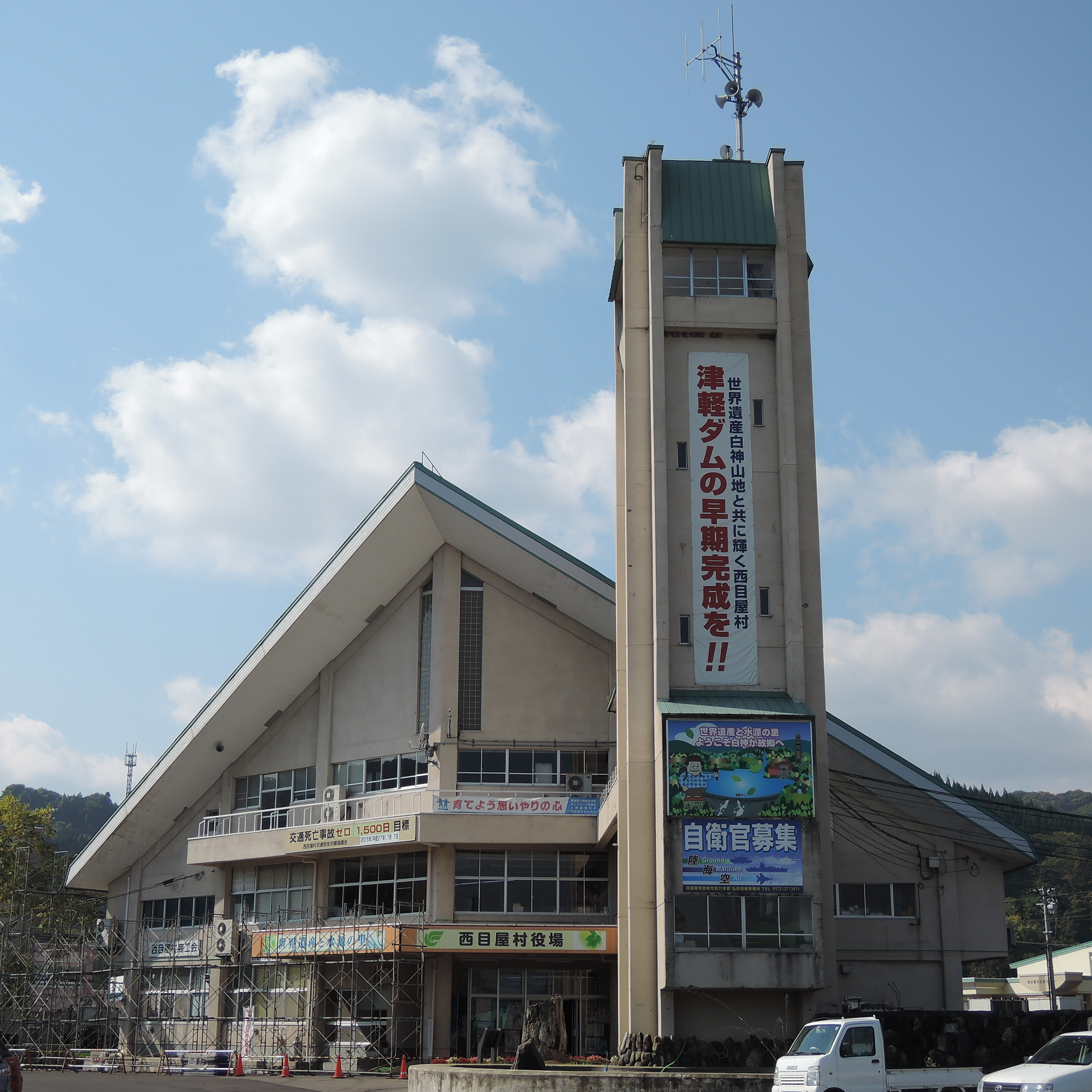
- Nishimeya village hall

- Flag Seal
- Location of Nishimeya in Aomori Prefecture

- Coordinates: 40°34′36.2″N 140°17′46.5″E
- Country: Japan
- Region: Tōhoku
- Prefecture: Aomori
- District: Nakatsugaru

Area
  - Total: 246.02 km^{2} (94.99 sq mi)

Population (January 1, 2026)
  - Total: 1,160
  - Density: 4.72/km^{2} (12.2/sq mi)
- Time zone: UTC+9 (Japan Standard Time)
- Phone number: 0172-85-2111
- Address: 144 Inamoto, Tashiro Nishimeya-mura, Nakatsugaru-gun, Aomori-ken 036-1492
- Website: Official website
- Symbols
- Bird: Black woodpecker

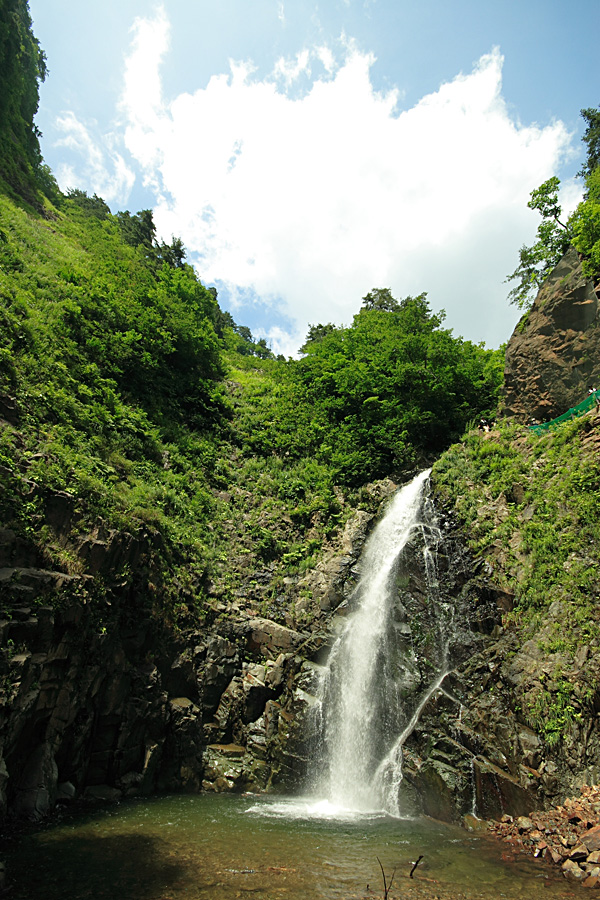
Anmon Falls

Nishimeya (西目屋村, Nishimeya-mura) is a village located in Aomori Prefecture, Japan. As of 1 January 2026, the village had an estimated population of 1160 in 523 households, and a population density of 4.7 persons per km^{2}. The total area of the village is 246.02 square kilometres (94.99 sq mi).

== Geography ==
Nishimeya is located in the far southern edge of Aomori Prefecture, bordering Akita Prefecture and the Shirakami-Sanchi mountain range, south of Mount Iwaki. The Iwaki River flows through the village, and the Tsugaru Dam and Lake Miyama are located in the center of the village. A portion of the Akaishi Keiryū Anmon no Taki Prefectural Natural Park is located in Nishimeya. The mountainous area is home to many indigenous plant and animal species. Wildlife includes Japanese macaque monkeys, kamoshika, tanuki and Asian black bears.

=== Neighbouring municipalities ===
Akita Prefecture

- Fujisato
- Ōdate

Aomori Prefecture

- Ajigasawa
- Hirosaki

=== Climate ===
The village has cold humid continental climate (Köppen Dfb) characterized by warm short summers and long cold winters with heavy snowfall. The average annual temperature in Nishimeya is 10.0 °C. The average annual rainfall is 1423 mm with September as the wettest month. The temperatures are highest on average in August, at around 23.6 °C, and lowest in January, at around -2.3 °C.

== Demographics ==
Per Japanese census data, the population of Nishimeya has decreased by more than half over the past 40 years and is considerably less than it was a century ago.

Historical population

| Year | Pop. | ±% p.a. |
|---|---|---|
| 1920 | 2,677 | — |
| 1930 | 3,003 | +1.16% |
| 1940 | 3,910 | +2.67% |
| 1950 | 3,917 | +0.02% |
| 1960 | 5,346 | +3.16% |
| 1970 | 4,327 | −2.09% |

| Year | Pop. | ±% p.a. |
|---|---|---|
| 1980 | 2,812 | −4.22% |
| 1990 | 2,225 | −2.31% |
| 2000 | 2,049 | −0.82% |
| 2010 | 1,594 | −2.48% |
| 2020 | 1,265 | −2.29% |

== History ==
The area around Nishimeya was controlled by the Tsugaru clan of Hirosaki Domain during the Edo period. It became a village in Nakatsugaru District on April 1, 1898, with the establishment of the modern municipalities system after the start of the Meiji period.

== Government ==
Nishimeya has a mayor-council form of government with a directly elected mayor and a unicameral village legislature of six members. Nishimiya is included with the city of Hirosaki, which contributes six members to the Aomori Prefectural Assembly. In terms of national politics, the village is part of Aomori 3rd district of the lower house of the Diet of Japan.

== Economy ==
The economy of Nishimeya is heavily dependent on agriculture and forestry.

== Education ==
Nishimeya has one public elementary school operated by village government. The village does not have a junior high school or a high school.

== Transportation ==
=== Railway ===
- The village does not have any passenger railway service. The nearest train station is Hirosaki Station on the JR East Ōu Main Line and Konan Railway Konan Line.

=== Highway ===
- The village is not located on any national highway.

== Sister city relations ==
- - Yehe Manchu Autonomous Banner, Lishu County, Jilin, People's Republic of China,

== Local attractions ==
- Akaishi Keiryū Anmon no Taki Prefectural Natural Park
- Shirakami-Sanchi, a UNESCO World Heritage Site
