= Isezakichō =

District of Naka-ku, Yokohama, Japan

Isezakichō 伊勢佐木町
- Entertainment district
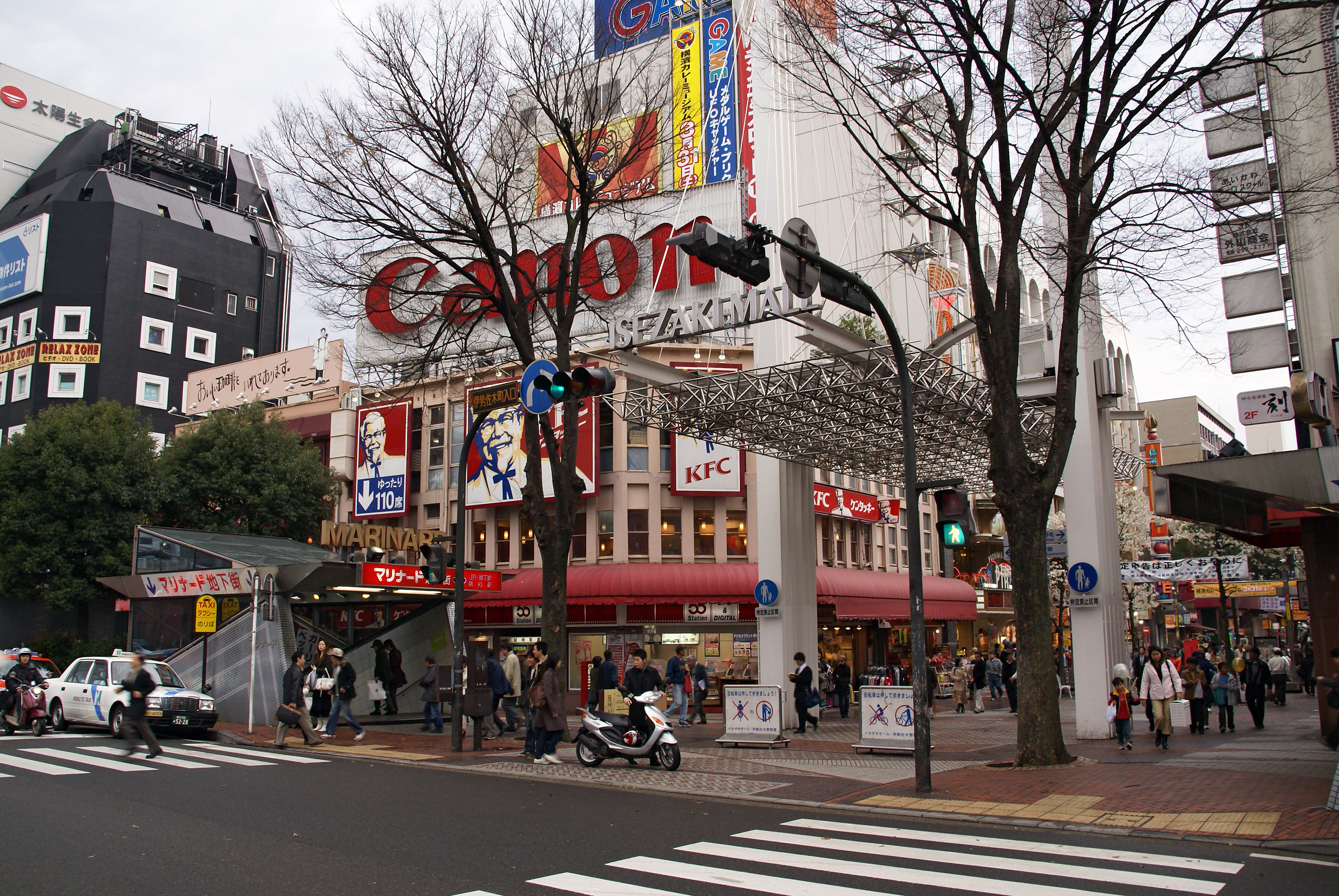
- Entrance to Isezakichō from Bashamichi Street

- Location within Yokohama Location within Kanagawa Prefecture Location within Japan
- Coordinates: 35°26′37″N 139°37′53″E
- Country: Japan
- Region: Kantō
- Prefecture: Kanagawa
- Ward: Naka-ku
- Time zone: UTC+9 (Japan Standard Time)

Isezakichō (伊勢佐木町) is a district of Naka Ward in Yokohama, Japan, consisting mainly of the Isezakichō Shopping Street (伊勢佐木町商店街, Isezakichō shōtengai). The shopping street is 1.2 km (0.75 mi) long, running from Isezakicho 1-chōme (-１丁目, -icchōme) in the northeast, to Isezakicho 7-chōme (-７丁目, -nanachōme) in the southwest, approximately parallel to the course of the Ōoka River.

== Destinations ==
Isezaki Mall is a special designation given to the 1-chōme (１丁目, icchōme) and 2-chōme (２丁目, nichōme) portions only, which is a car-free zone. The largest shops and businesses are in the Isezaki Mall area in the northeast end, closer to Kannai Station. As you walk along the Isezakicho Shopping Street towards 7-chōme in the southwest end, the shops become gradually smaller and the pedestrian traffic tapers off. On the other end, walking past the northeast end of the pedestrian zone, passing Kannai Station, the street continues into the Bashamichi Street.

The site of Isezaki Mall was created by a project that filled in a small bay which started in 1656 and was completed in 1667, creating an island named Yoshida Shinden connected by bridges to the rest of Yokohama. After the Convention of Kanagawa was signed in 1854, Yokohama became one of the first treaty ports, established in 1859, and additional land reclamation projects expanded the site to its present size. Initially, foreign settlements were established in the eastern part, named Kannai, separated from the western areas by a gate; Kannai was connected to the port via the Yoshida-bashi Bridge, completed in 1869 by Richard Henry Brunton as Japan's first Western-style iron bridge.

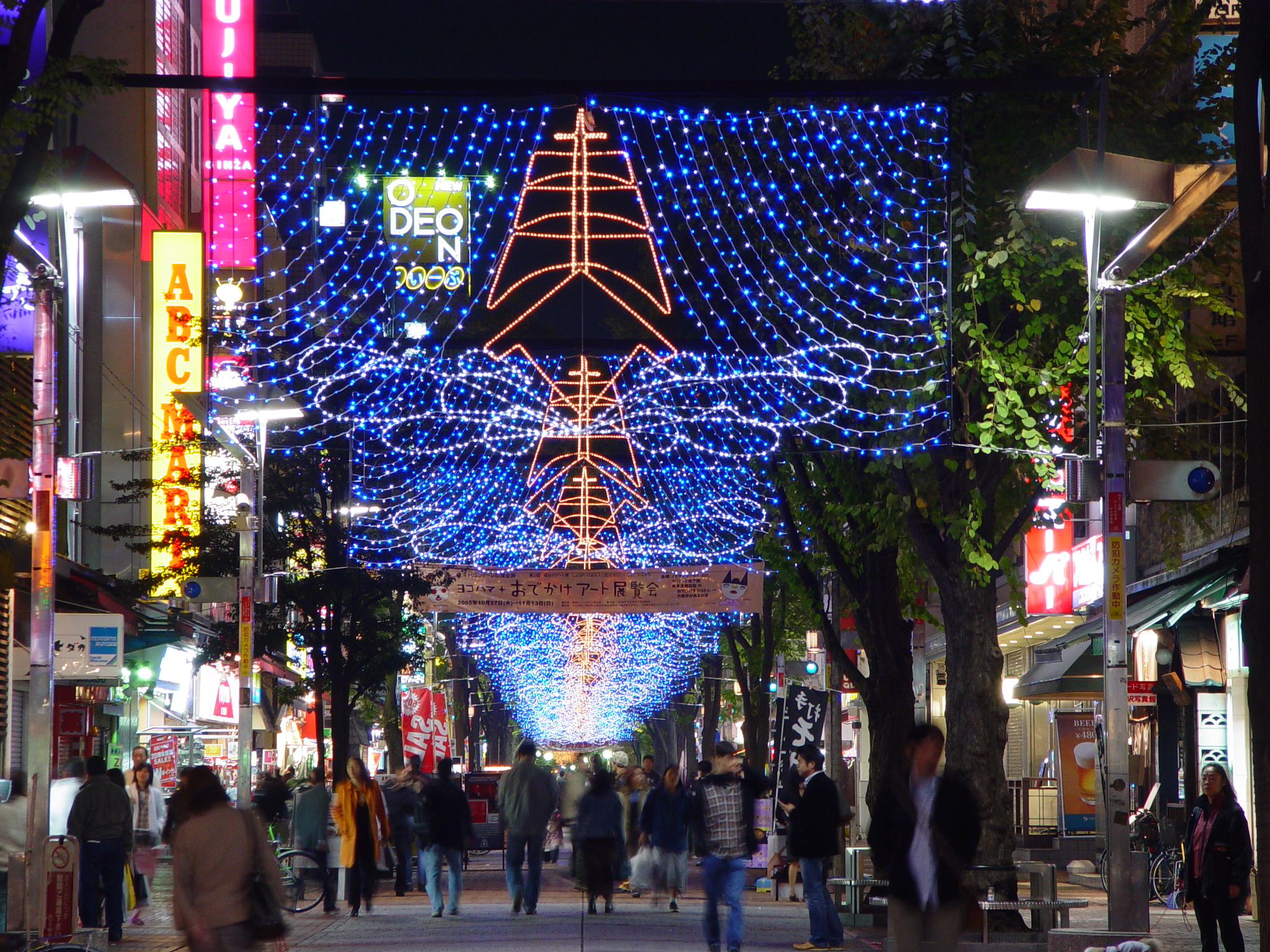
Isezaki Mall shopping street, illuminated at night

Until the 1960s, Isezakicho was the only large shopping area in Yokohama catering to local residents. Since then, Motomachi and the Yokohama Station area have grown in popularity. Motomachi had previously catered mainly to foreign residents, while the Yokohama Station developed into a large shopping area only in the 1970s. Today, Isezakicho continues to be one of the major shopping areas of Yokohama.

=== Major Attractions ===
- Yurindo Bookstore, Main Location
- Fujiya (This is the 2nd Fujiya restaurant ever opened. The 1st store in Motomachi no longer exists.)

=== In media ===
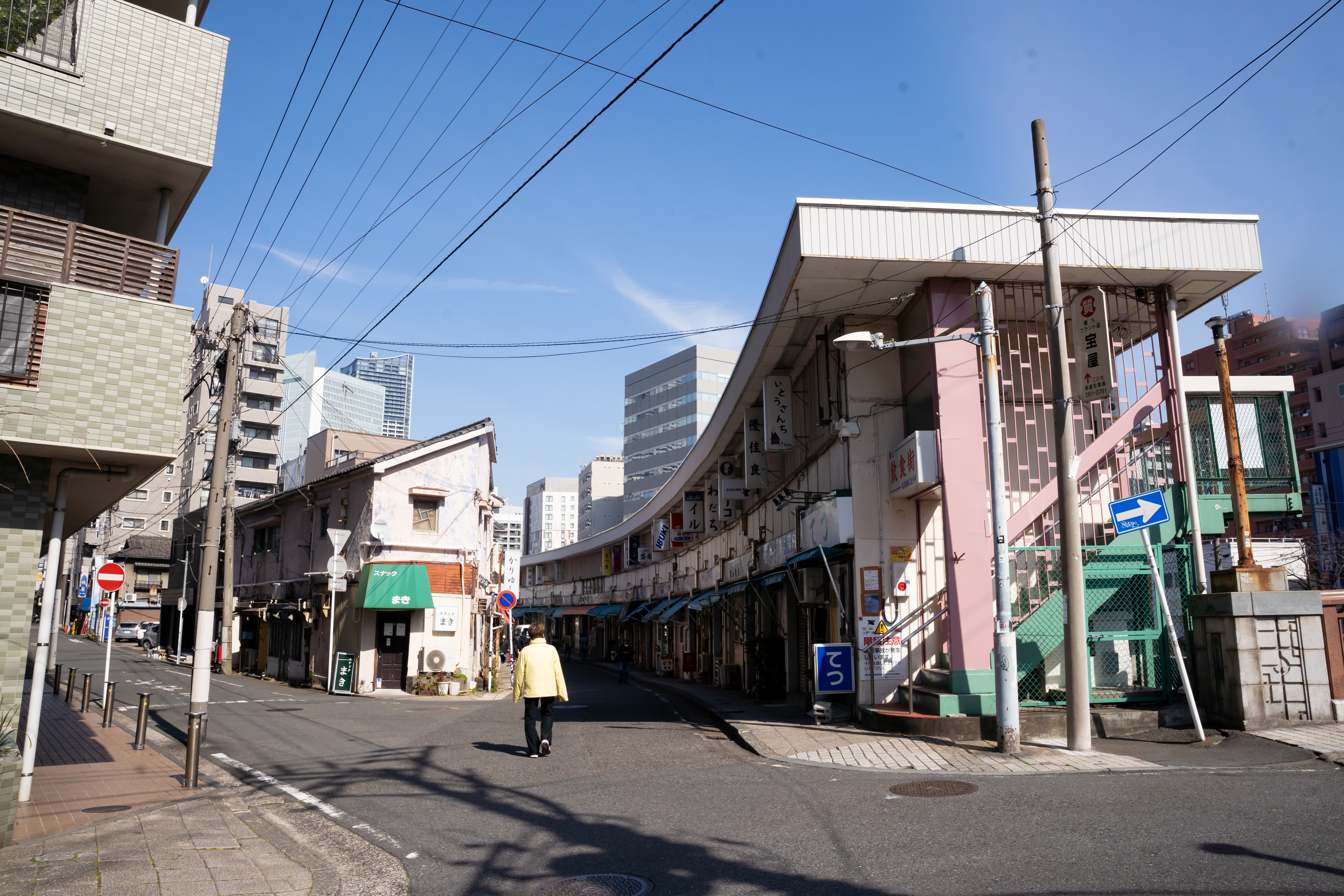
"Bar District" featured in later games of the Like a Dragon series; this is near the north end of Miyagawa Bridge

A fictionalized version of Isezakichō, named Isezaki Ijincho, is featured in the Like a Dragon video game series. It debuted in Yakuza: Like a Dragon, and was subsequently featured in Lost Judgment, Like a Dragon Gaiden: The Man Who Erased His Name, and Like a Dragon: Infinite Wealth.

In the game, Isezaki Ijincho collectively encompasses the area around the pedestrian portion of Isezaki Mall (as "Isezaki Road"), Chinatown, Kannai Station, and Yamashita Park (as "Hamakita Park"); waterfront views from Hamakita Park include a view of Minato Mirai 21 and its landmarks, but that area is not included.

== Education ==
The Yokohama Municipal Board of Education operates public elementary and junior high schools.

1-4 chome are zoned to Honcho Elementary School (本町小学校), while 5-7 chome are zoned to Azuma Elementary School (東小学校). 1-4 chome are also zoned to Yokohama Yoshida Junior High School (横浜吉田中学校), while Azuma feeds into Oimatsu Junior High School (老松中学校).

== Transportation ==
Isezakichō is served by the following rail stations:

- Isezaki-chōjamachi (Yokohama Municipal Subway, Blue Line)
- Kannai (JR East, Keihin–Tōhoku/Negishi Line & Yokohama Blue Line)
