= Nakamura River (Aomori) =

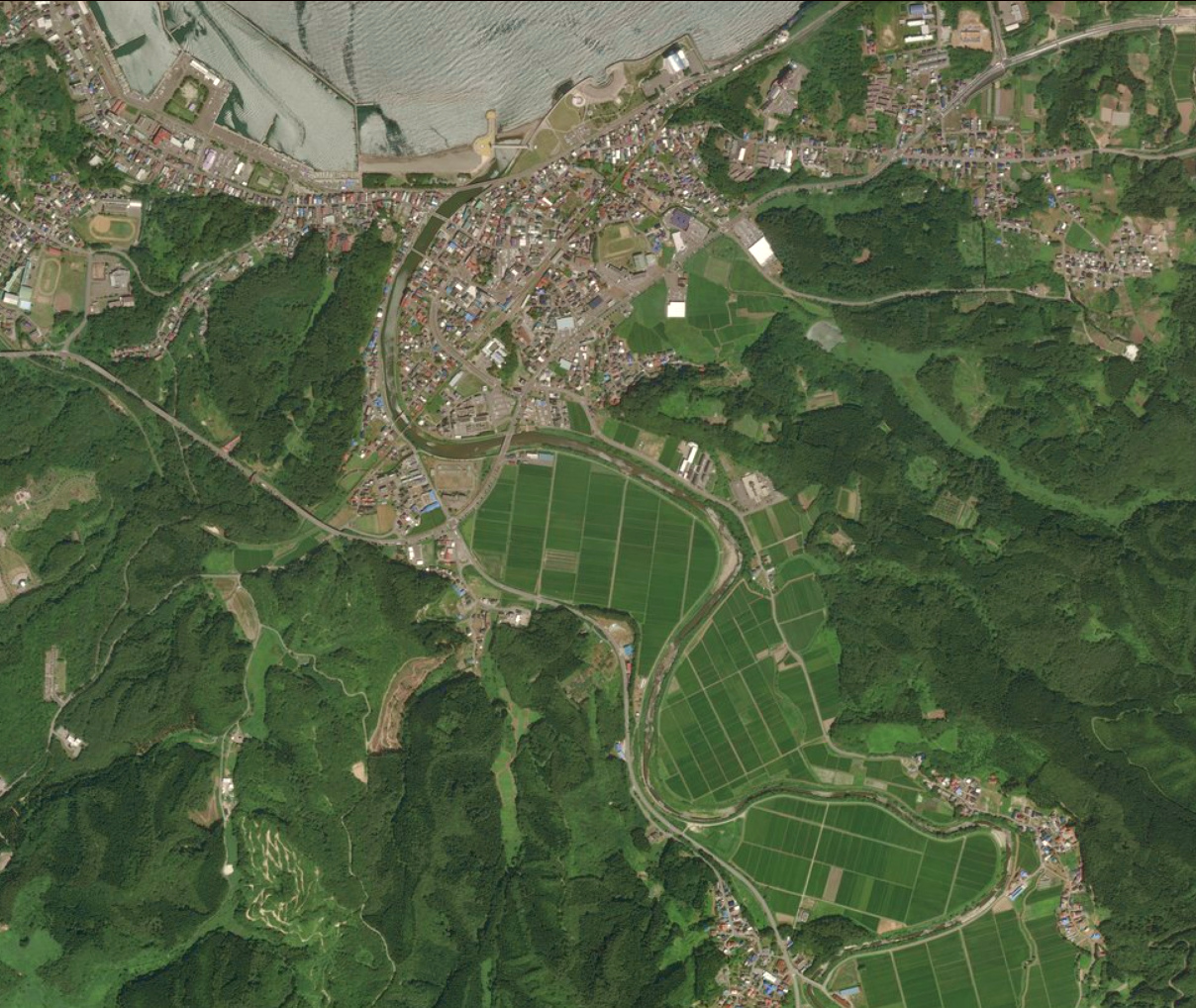

- Location within Japan
- Native name: 中村川 (Japanese)

Location
- Country: Japan
- Region: Tōhoku

Physical characteristics
- Source
  - location: Hirosaki, Aomori
  - coordinates: 40°33′53″N 140°10′48″E
- Mouth: Sea of Japan
  - location: Ajigasawa, Aomori
  - coordinates: 40°46′48″N 140°13′15″E
  - elevation: 0 m (0 ft)
- Length: 44.9 km (27.9 mi)
- Basin size: 149 km^{2} (58 sq mi)

The Nakamura River (中村川, Nakamura-gawa) is a river located in Aomori Prefecture of Japan. Taking its source in the city of Hirosaki, it winds at the foot of Mount Iwaki before jumping into the Sea of Japan, in Ajigasawa.

== Geography ==
At 44.9 km long, the Nakamura River flows in the west of Aomori Prefecture, on the island of Honshū, in Japan. It rises on the slopes of a wooded hill: Shiheimori (641.7 m), located in the west of the city of Hirosaki. Leaving Hirosaki, its course heads north, at the foot of the western slope of Mount Iwaki. It crosses, from south to north, the north of the town of Ajigasawa, before flowing into the Sea of Japan.

The Nakamura river watershed covers an area of 149 km2. Streams and rivers meandering on the western slope of the Iwaki volcano feed it.
