= Yurindo =

Japanese publishing company and bookstore chain

Yurindo Co., LTD. 株式会社有隣堂
- Company type: Business corporation
- Industry: Retail
- Founded: December 13, 1909
- Founder: Daisuke Matsunobu
- Headquarters: Yokohama, Kanagawa, Japan
- Key people: 松信 裕, President
- Revenue: 54.1 billion yen (2006 fiscal year)
- Website: http://www.yurindo.co.jp/ (Japanese)

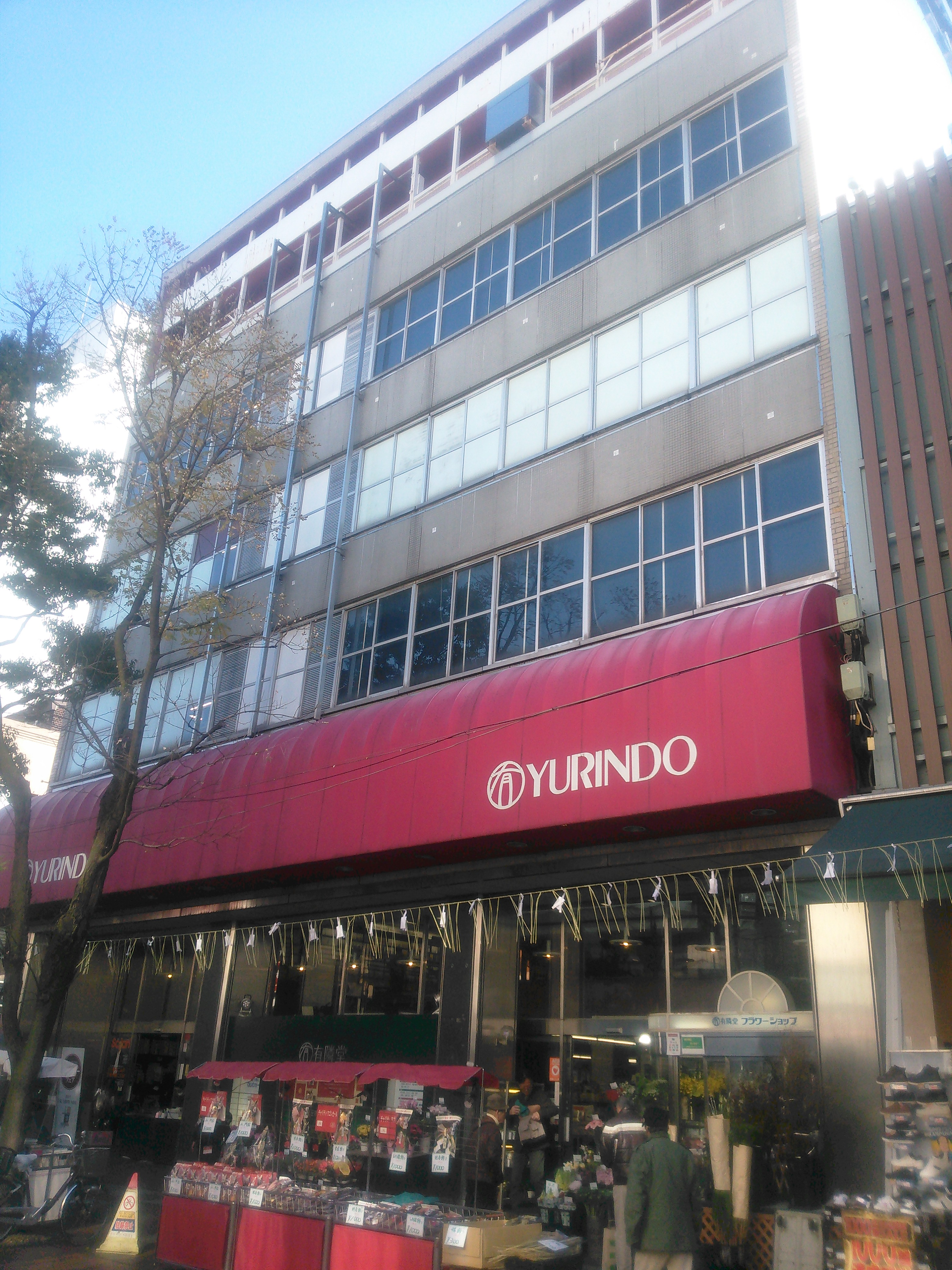
Yurindo bookstore in Isezakichō, Yokohama.

Yurindo Co., LTD. (株式会社有隣堂, Kabushiki-gaisha Yūrindō) is a Japanese publishing company and bookstore, founded in 1909.
