= Fujisato, Akita =

Fujisato 藤里町
- Town
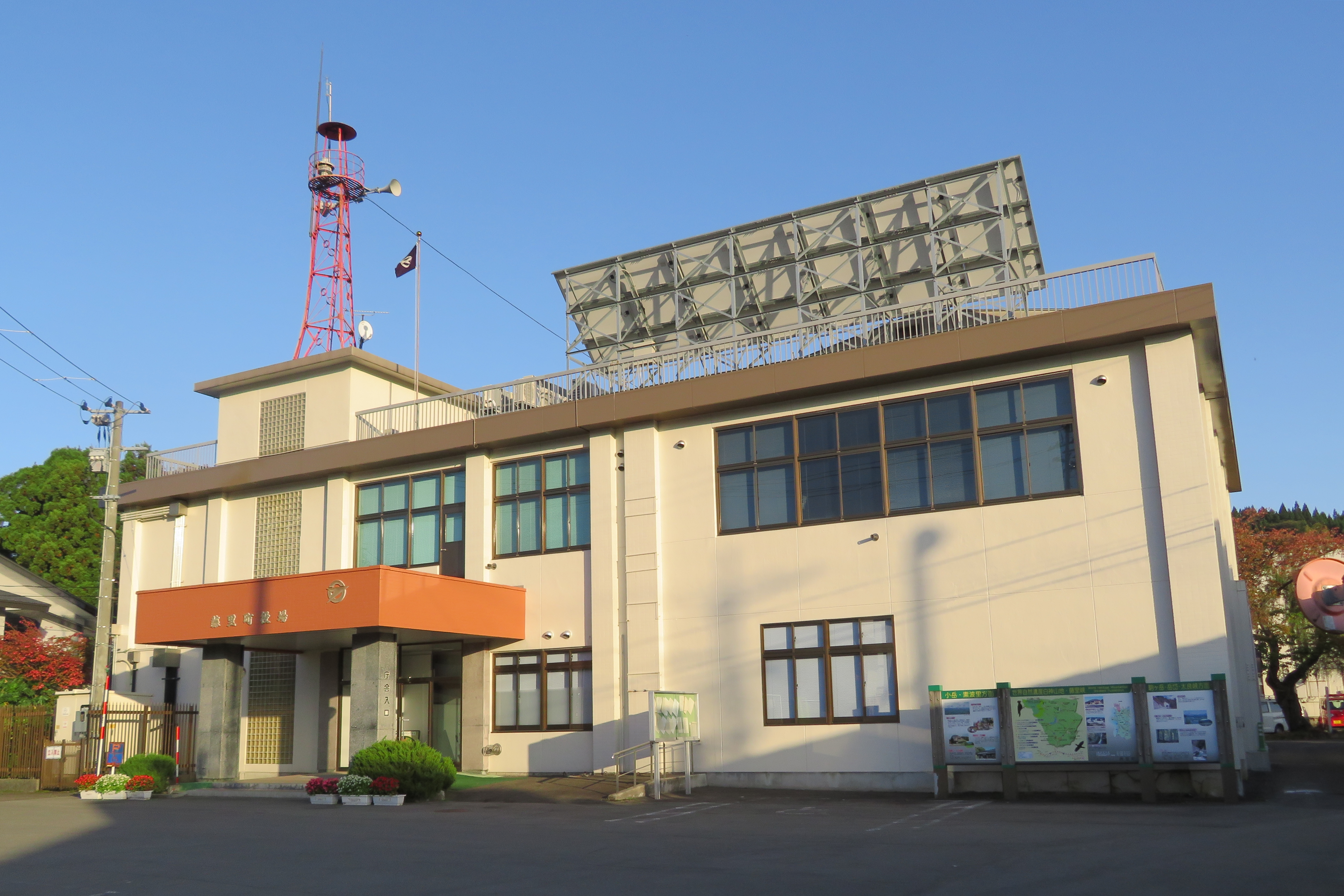
- Fujisato Town Hall

- Flag Seal
- Interactive map of Fujisato
- Coordinates: 40°17′N 140°16′E
- Country: Japan
- Region: Tōhoku
- Prefecture: Akita
- District: Yamamoto

Area
  - Total: 282.13 km^{2} (108.93 sq mi)

Population (February 28, 2023)
  - Total: 2,890
  - Density: 10.2/km^{2} (26.5/sq mi)
- Time zone: UTC+9 (Japan Standard Time)
- Climate: Cfa
- Phone number: 0185-79-2111
- Address: Fujigoto 8, Fujigoto-aze Fujisato-machi, Yamamoto-gun, Akita-ken 018-3201
- Website: Official website
- Symbols
- Bird: Black woodpecker
- Flower: Wisteria floribunda
- Tree: Fagus crenata

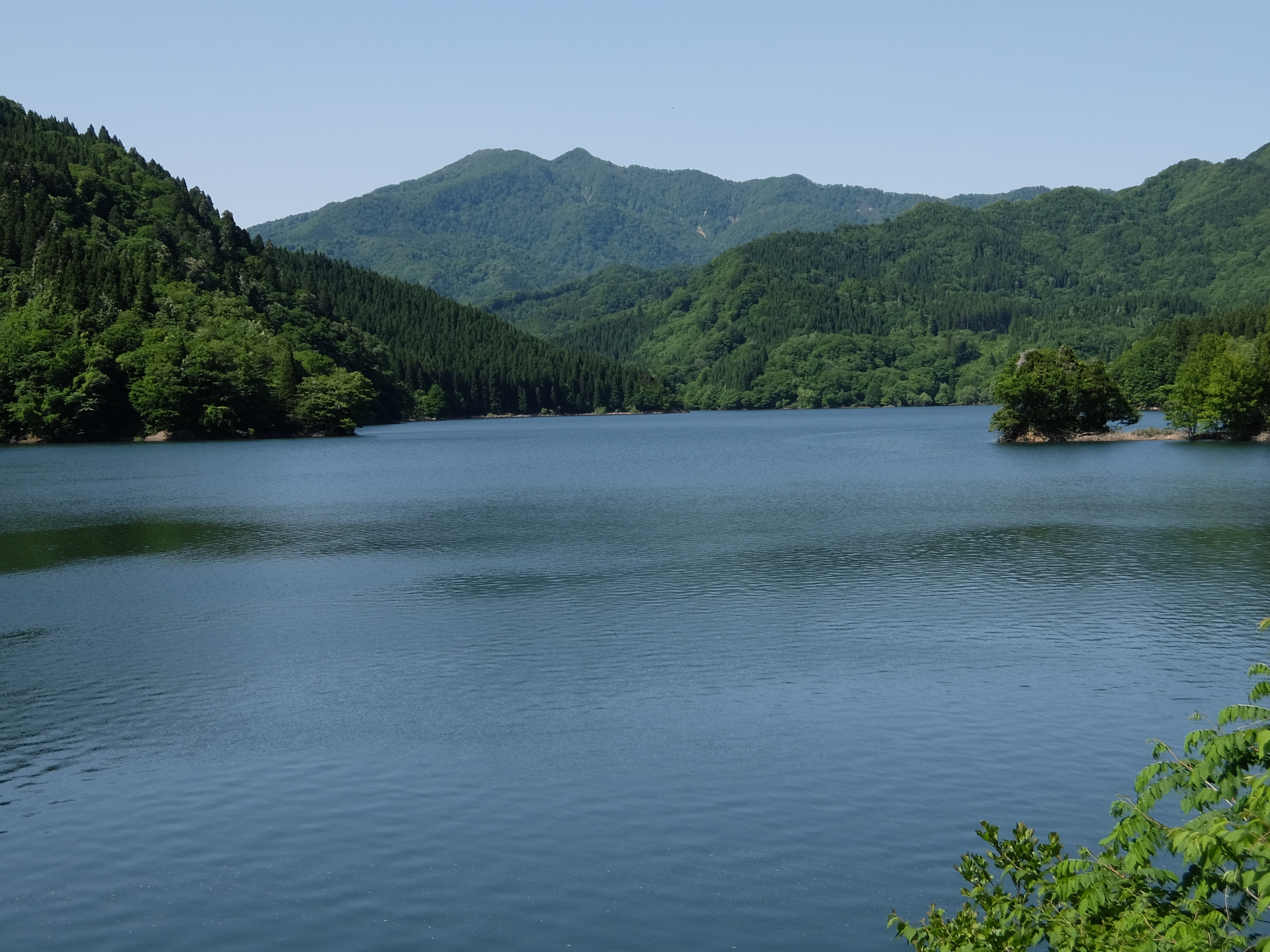
Lake Subari and Mount Fujisato Komagatake

Fujisato (藤里町, Fujisato-machi) is a town located in Akita, Japan. As of 28 February 2023, the town had an estimated population of 2,890 in 1315 households, and a population density of 10 persons per km^{2}. The total area of the town is 281.98 square kilometres (108.87 sq mi).

== Geography ==
Fujisato is located at the confluence of the Kasuge River and the Fujikoto River in the Yoneshiro River system in far northwestern of Akita Prefecture. It is bordered by the World Heritage Site Shirakami Mountains to the south, and by Aomori Prefecture to the north. The town itself is nestled in a small valley at the base of the Shirakami Mountains. The hillsides are brimming with lush green in the summer, amazing orange in the autumn, and covered in white snow during the winter. Due to its location in the middle of the mountains, the temperature in Fujisato can get remarkably cold at night, with snowfall tending to be somewhat greater than that in neighboring municipalities.

=== Neighboring municipalities ===
Akita Prefecture

- Happō
- Kitaakita
- Noshiro
- Ōdate

Aomori Prefecture

- Ajigasawa
- Nishimeya

=== Climate ===
Fujisato has a humid continental climate (Köppen climate classification Cfa) with large seasonal temperature differences, with warm to hot (and often humid) summers and cold (sometimes severely cold) winters. Precipitation is significant throughout the year, but is heaviest from August to October. The average annual temperature in Fujisato is 10.3 °C. The average annual rainfall is 1471 mm with September as the wettest month. The temperatures are highest on average in August, at around 24.3 °C, and lowest in January, at around -2.1 °C.

== Demographics ==
Per Japanese census data, the population of Fujisato peaked around the year 1950 and has been in steady decline since then.

Historical population
Year	Pop.	±%
1920	6,797	—
1930	6,882	+1.3%
1940	7,028	+2.1%
1950	8,982	+27.8%
1960	8,642	−3.8%
1970	6,769	−21.7%
1980	5,837	−13.8%
1990	5,291	−9.4%
2000	4,708	−11.0%
2010	3,848	−18.3%
2020	2,896	−24.7%

== History ==
The area of present-day Fujisato was part of ancient Dewa Province, dominated by the Satake clan during the Edo period, who ruled Kubota Domain under the Tokugawa shogunate. The area was organized into villages within Yamamoto District, Akita with the establishment of the modern municipalities system on April 1, 1884. The village of Fujisato was established on March 31, 1955, from the merger of the villages of Fujigoto and Kasuge, both from Yamamoto District. It was raised to town status on November 1, 1963.

== Government ==
Fujisato has a mayor-council form of government with a directly elected mayor and a unicameral town council of ten members. Fujisato, together with the city of Noshiro and the other municipalities of Yamamoto District contributes four members to the Akita Prefectural Assembly. In terms of national politics, the town is part of Akita 2nd district of the lower house of the Diet of Japan.

== Economy ==
The economy of Fujisato is based on agriculture and forestry. Economic development has been hampered by the town's isolation: there are no railway lines, national roads, or major local roads to any neighboring municipality.

== Education ==
Fujisato has one public elementary school and one public middle school operated by the town government. The town does not have a high school.

== Transportation ==
Fujisato has no railways and is not served by the Japanese national highway system. Access is primarily through Akita Prefectural Road 200 or 317.
