= Yokohama Silk Museum =

Textile museum in Yokohama, Japan

Coordinates: 35.447570°N 139.645337°E

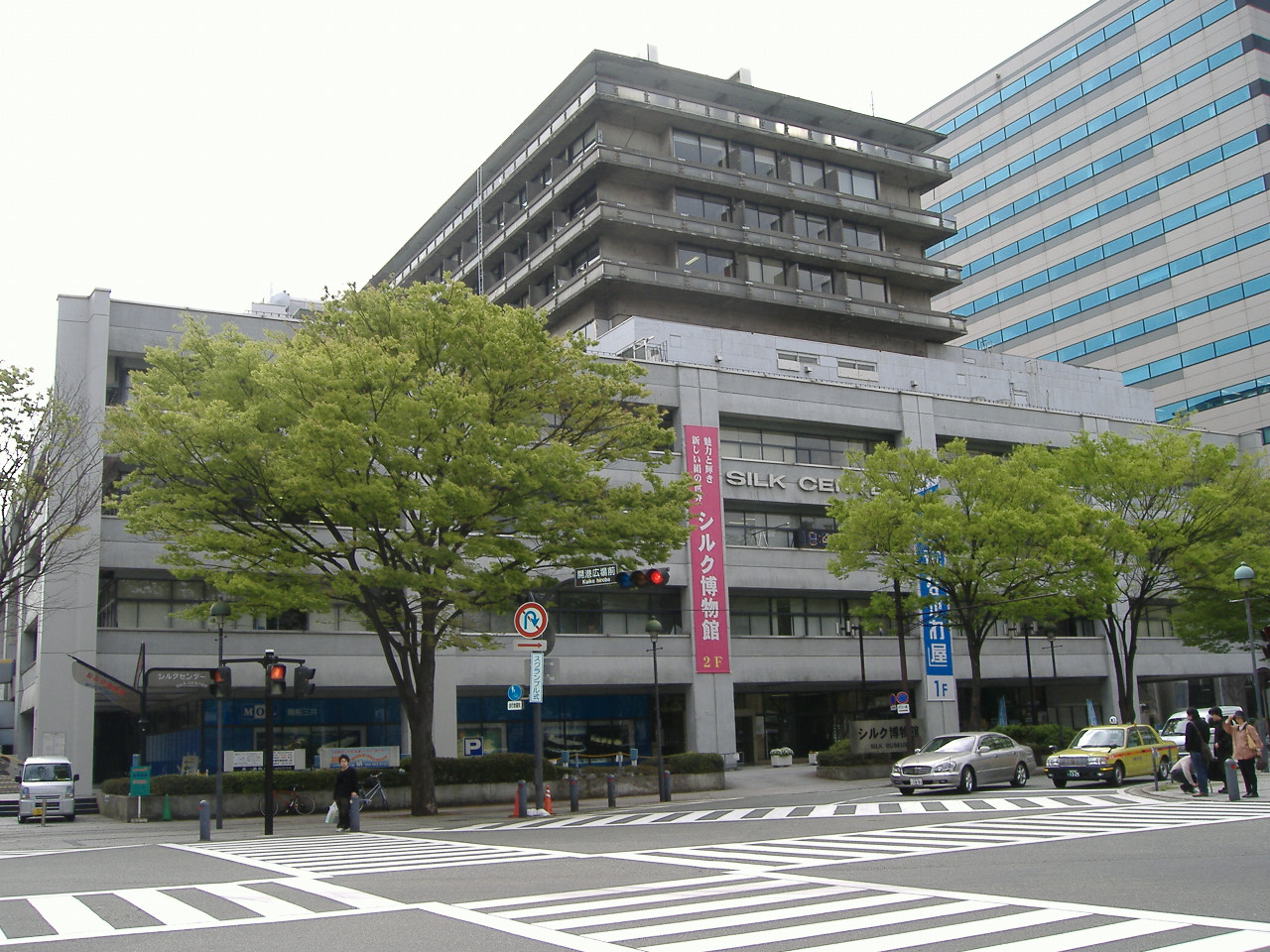
Yokohama Silk Center

The Yokohama Silk Museum is a museum located in Naka-ku, Yokohama, Japan that covers the silk trade in Japan. The museum displays silk kimono and covers the importance of Yokohama as a silk port.

The objective of the museum is, according to its website:

To disseminate an understanding of the science and technology of silk production, display beautiful costumes for people to admire and promote the demand for silk.
