= Ajigasawa, Aomori =

Ajigasawa 鰺ヶ沢町
- Town
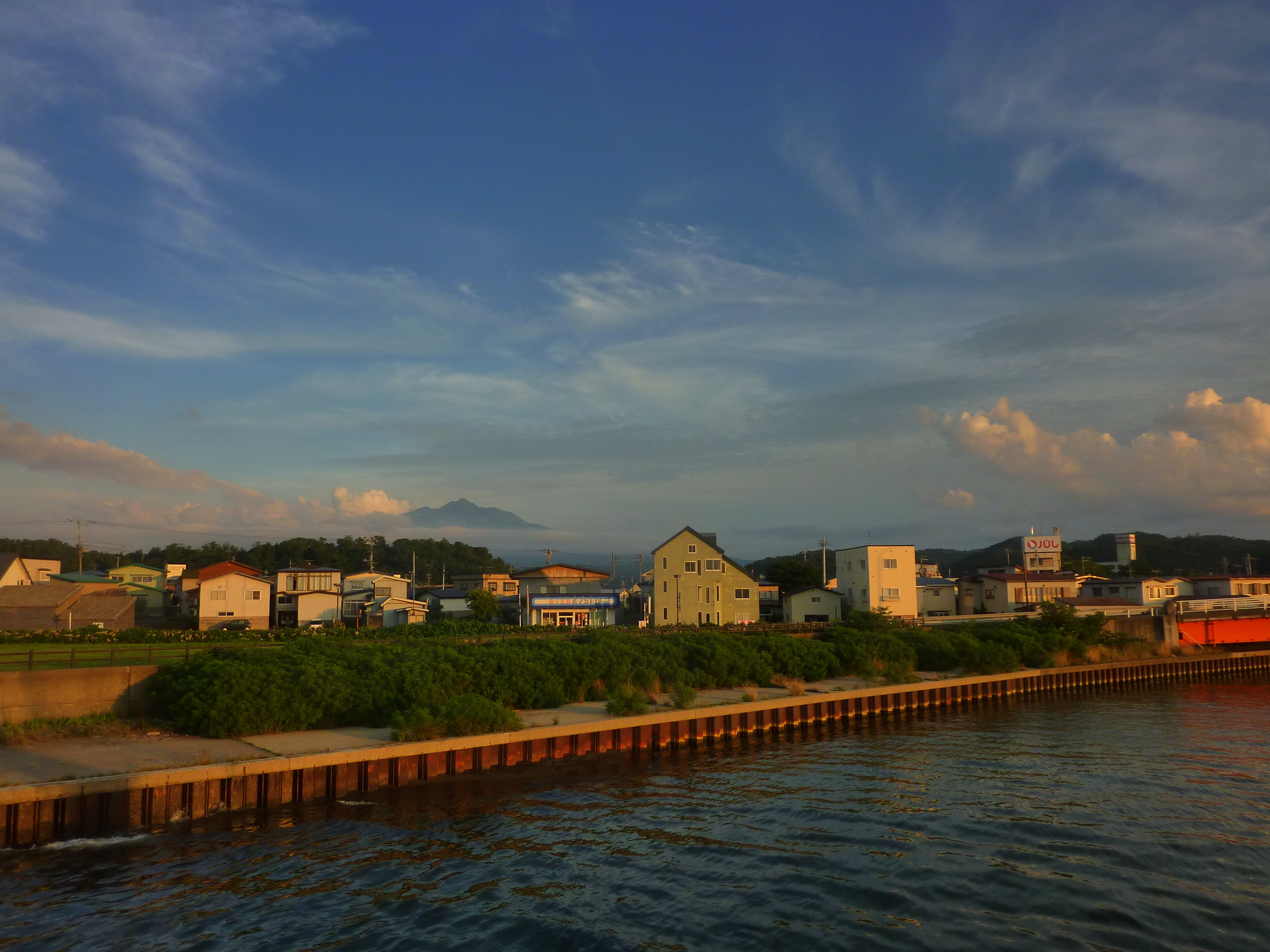
- Ajigasawa Town

- Flag Seal
- Location of Ajigasawa in Aomori Prefecture

- Coordinates: 40°46′48″N 140°12′31″E
- Country: Japan
- Region: Tōhoku
- Prefecture: Aomori
- District: Nishitsugaru

Area
  - Total: 343.08 km^{2} (132.46 sq mi)

Population (December 31, 2025)
  - Total: 8,250
  - Density: 24.0/km^{2} (62.3/sq mi)
- Time zone: UTC+9 (Japan Standard Time)
- Phone number: 0173-72-2111
- Address: 321 Maitocho-aza-Naruto, Ajigasawa-machi, Nishitsugaru-gun, Aomori-ken 038-2792
- Climate: Cfa
- Website: Official website
- Symbols
- Bird: Japanese bush-warbler
- Flower: Rosa rugosa
- Tree: Keyaki

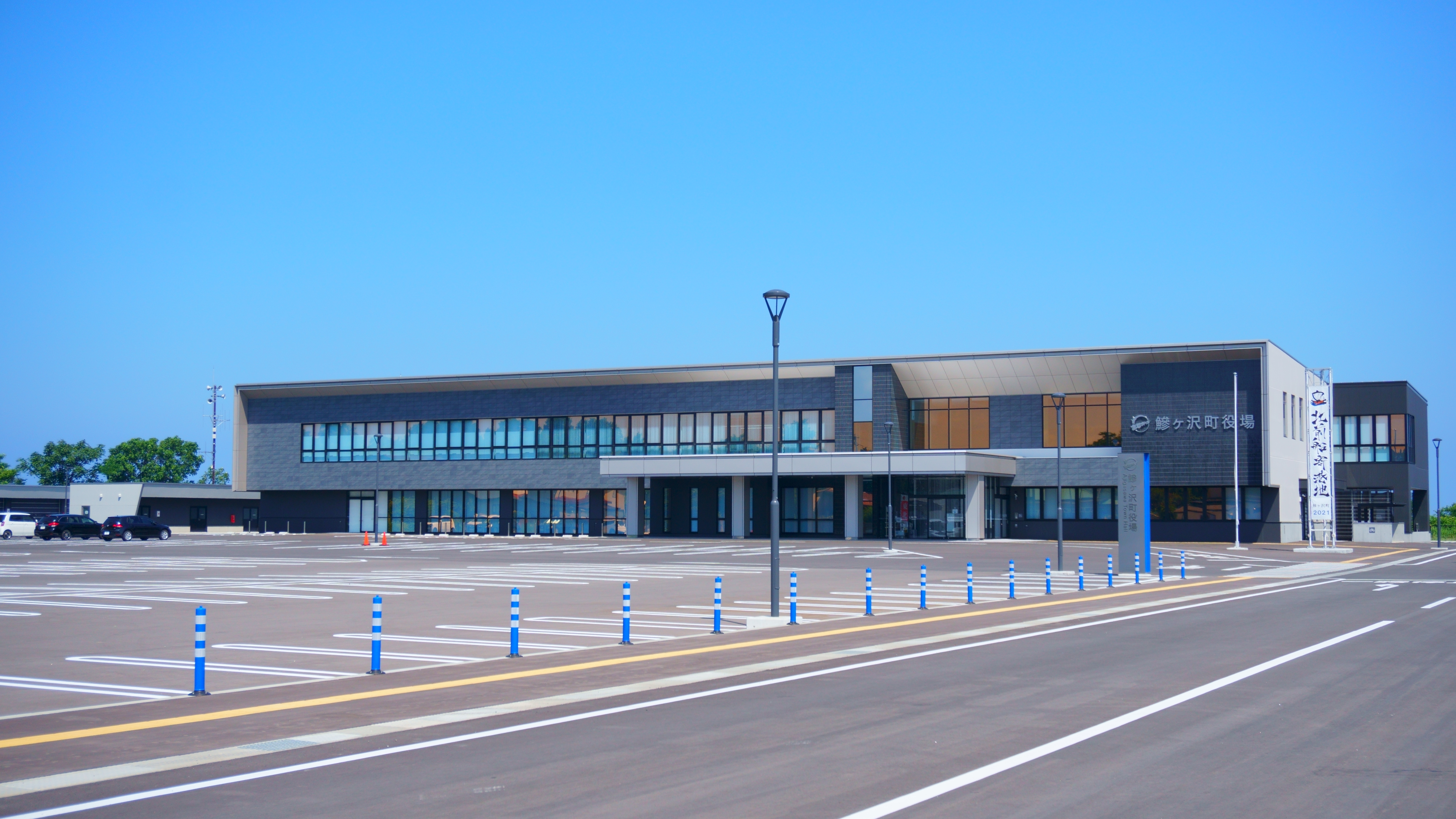
Ajigasawa Town Hall

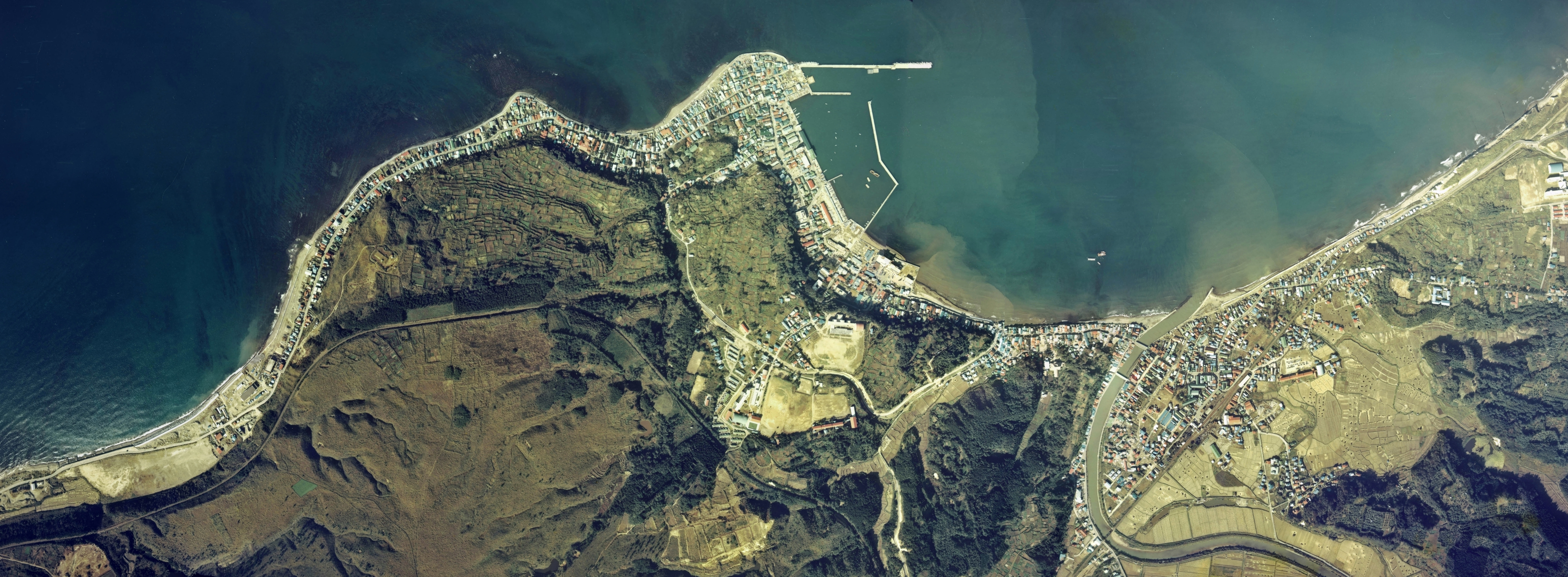
Aerial photograph of Ajigasawa town center

Ajigasawa (鰺ヶ沢町, Ajigasawa-machi) is a town located in Aomori Prefecture, Japan. As of 31 December 2025, the town had an estimated population of 8,250 in 4282 households, and a population density of 24 persons per km^{2}. The total area of the town is 343.08 square kilometres (132.46 sq mi).

== Geography ==
Ajigasawa is in Nishitsugaru District, Aomori southwestern corner of Aomori Prefecture on the border with Akita Prefecture, facing the Sea of Japan to the northwest, and the slopes of Mount Iwaki to the southeast. Part of the town is located within the borders of the Shirakami-Sanchi, a UNESCO World Heritage Site, and some coastal areas of the town are within the Tsugaru Quasi-National Park. The Akaishi Keiryū Anmon no Taki Prefectural Natural Park is also partly located within the borders of Ajigasawa.

=== Neighbouring municipalities ===
Akita Prefecture

- Fujisato
- Happō

Aomori Prefecture

- Fukaura
- Hirosaki
- Nishimeya
- Tsugaru

=== Climate ===
The town has a cold humid continental climate (Köppen Dfb) characterized by warm short summers and long cold winters with heavy snowfall. The average annual temperature in Ajigasawa is 10.7 °C. The average annual rainfall is 1480 mm with September as the wettest month. The temperatures are highest on average in August, at around 22.9 °C, and lowest in January, at around −3.1 °C.

Climate data for Ajigasawa (1991−2020 normals, extremes 1976−present)
Month	Jan	Feb	Mar	Apr	May	Jun	Jul	Aug	Sep	Oct	Nov	Dec	Year
Record high °C (°F)	12.4 (54.3)	18.3 (64.9)	20.2 (68.4)	28.3 (82.9)	32.3 (90.1)	31.4 (88.5)	35.3 (95.5)	36.9 (98.4)	35.3 (95.5)	27.7 (81.9)	24.0 (75.2)	17.8 (64.0)	36.9 (98.4)
Mean daily maximum °C (°F)	2.2 (36.0)	2.8 (37.0)	6.6 (43.9)	12.8 (55.0)	17.9 (64.2)	21.3 (70.3)	25.2 (77.4)	27.0 (80.6)	23.6 (74.5)	17.6 (63.7)	11.3 (52.3)	5.0 (41.0)	14.4 (58.0)
Daily mean °C (°F)	−0.2 (31.6)	0.1 (32.2)	3.0 (37.4)	8.2 (46.8)	13.2 (55.8)	17.1 (62.8)	21.3 (70.3)	22.8 (73.0)	19.3 (66.7)	13.4 (56.1)	7.6 (45.7)	2.1 (35.8)	10.7 (51.2)
Mean daily minimum °C (°F)	−2.9 (26.8)	−2.9 (26.8)	−0.7 (30.7)	3.6 (38.5)	8.5 (47.3)	13.2 (55.8)	17.9 (64.2)	19.2 (66.6)	15.3 (59.5)	9.3 (48.7)	3.9 (39.0)	−0.8 (30.6)	7.0 (44.5)
Record low °C (°F)	−10.9 (12.4)	−10.3 (13.5)	−9.3 (15.3)	−4.1 (24.6)	−1.2 (29.8)	4.8 (40.6)	8.4 (47.1)	10.1 (50.2)	6.5 (43.7)	1.0 (33.8)	−6.6 (20.1)	−10.0 (14.0)	−10.9 (12.4)
Average precipitation mm (inches)	108.0 (4.25)	79.5 (3.13)	73.0 (2.87)	72.5 (2.85)	78.7 (3.10)	83.3 (3.28)	127.1 (5.00)	157.4 (6.20)	154.3 (6.07)	149.1 (5.87)	159.0 (6.26)	144.9 (5.70)	1,386.7 (54.59)
Average snowfall cm (inches)	140 (55)	121 (48)	60 (24)	2 (0.8)	0 (0)	0 (0)	0 (0)	0 (0)	0 (0)	0 (0)	6 (2.4)	84 (33)	412 (162)
Average precipitation days (≥ 1.0 mm)	21.8	18.0	14.7	11.1	10.2	9.3	9.7	10.5	11.8	14.4	17.5	21.5	170.5
Average snowy days (≥ 3 cm)	16.9	15.0	7.5	0.3	0	0	0	0	0	0	0.9	9.6	50.2
Mean monthly sunshine hours	27.4	53.7	123.5	196.8	213.6	194.8	180.1	200.6	168.0	136.7	70.9	33.5	1,599.5
Source: Japan Meteorological Agency

== Demographics ==
Per Japanese census data, the population of Ajigasawa has decreased by more than half over the past 60 years.

Historical population
Year	Pop.	±% p.a.
1950	22,741	—
1960	22,123	−0.28%
1970	18,439	−1.81%
1980	17,402	−0.58%
1990	14,899	−1.54%
2000	13,551	−0.94%
2010	11,449	−1.67%
2020	9,613	−1.73%

== History ==
Oura Mitsunobu, the founder of the Tsugaru clan, settled in Tanesato (now part of Ajigasawa) in 1491, which developed into a port for the Tsugaru region. The area around Ajigasawa was controlled by the Tsugaru clan of Hirosaki Domain during the Edo period, and Ajigasawa was a thriving port on the kitamaebune coastal trading route, and after the Meiji restoration, was one of the main commercial fishing centers in Aomori. Ajigasawa became a village in Nishitsugaru District, Aomori with the establishment of the modern municipalities system on April 1, 1889, and was elevated to town status on March 31, 1955, by annexing the neighboring villages of Akaishi, Nakamura, Narusawa and Maido.

== Government ==
Ajigasawa has a mayor-council form of government with a directly elected mayor and a unicameral town legislature of 12 members. Nishitsugaru District contributes one member to the Aomori Prefectural Assembly. In terms of national politics, the town is part of Aomori 3rd district of the lower house of the Diet of Japan.

== Economy ==
The economy of Ajigasawa is heavily dependent on agriculture (rice and horticulture) and on commercial fishing, especially for squid. Other species commonly caught in the local waters include the Japanese flounder, Japanese horse mackerel, Atka mackerel, red snapper, cod, angler fish, octopus, sharks and salmon.

== Education ==
Ajigasawa has two public elementary schools and one public junior high schools operated by the town government and one public high school operated by the Aomori Prefectural Board of Education.

The Shirakami Nature School is a non-profit organization that is housed in a 19th-century wooden building that was used as an elementary school until the spring of 2003. The Shirakami Nature School hosts a wide variety of environmental education including classroom activities and open-air classes to people of all ages.

== Transportation ==
=== Railway ===
East Japan Railway Company (JR East) - Gonō Line

- Mutsu-Akaishi - Ajigasawa - Narusawa

=== Highway ===
- Tsugaru Expressway
- National Route 101

== International relations ==
- – São Sebastião, São Paulo, Brazil since October 26, 1984

== Local attractions ==
- The Kikuya squid stand on the outskirts of town is the home of Wasao, an Akita dog that garnered nationwide attention after starring in a 2011 feature film which was filmed on location in the town.
- Aomori Spring Ski Resort (formerly known as NAQUA Shirakami Ski Resort).
- Aomori Spring Golf Club
- Rockwood Hotel & Spa
- Ajigasawa Beach is about a ten-minute walk from the train station and has both grass and sand areas with a view of the Sea of Japan.
- Umi No Eki “Wando” is a collection of stores, much like a market, that sells local goods directly from the farmers and fishermen. The products sold here are all local, and very fresh.
- Shirakami-Sanchi – UNESCO World Heritage Site
- Otaka-yama park is open to the public and includes a multipurpose stadium, tennis courts, amphitheater, go-carts and an elaborate playground.
- Kurokuma Falls (くろくまの滝, Kurokuma no taki), gets its name from its appearance; it looks like a standing black bear. It is one of Japan’s Top 100 Waterfalls.
- Tanesato Castle ruins, a National Historic Site*Akaishi Keiryū Anmon no Taki Prefectural Natural Park

== Noted people from Ajigasawa ==
- Hiyori Kon, sumo wrestler
- Mainoumi Shuhei, sumo wrestler
- Homarefuji Yoshiyuki, sumo wrestler

== Gallery ==
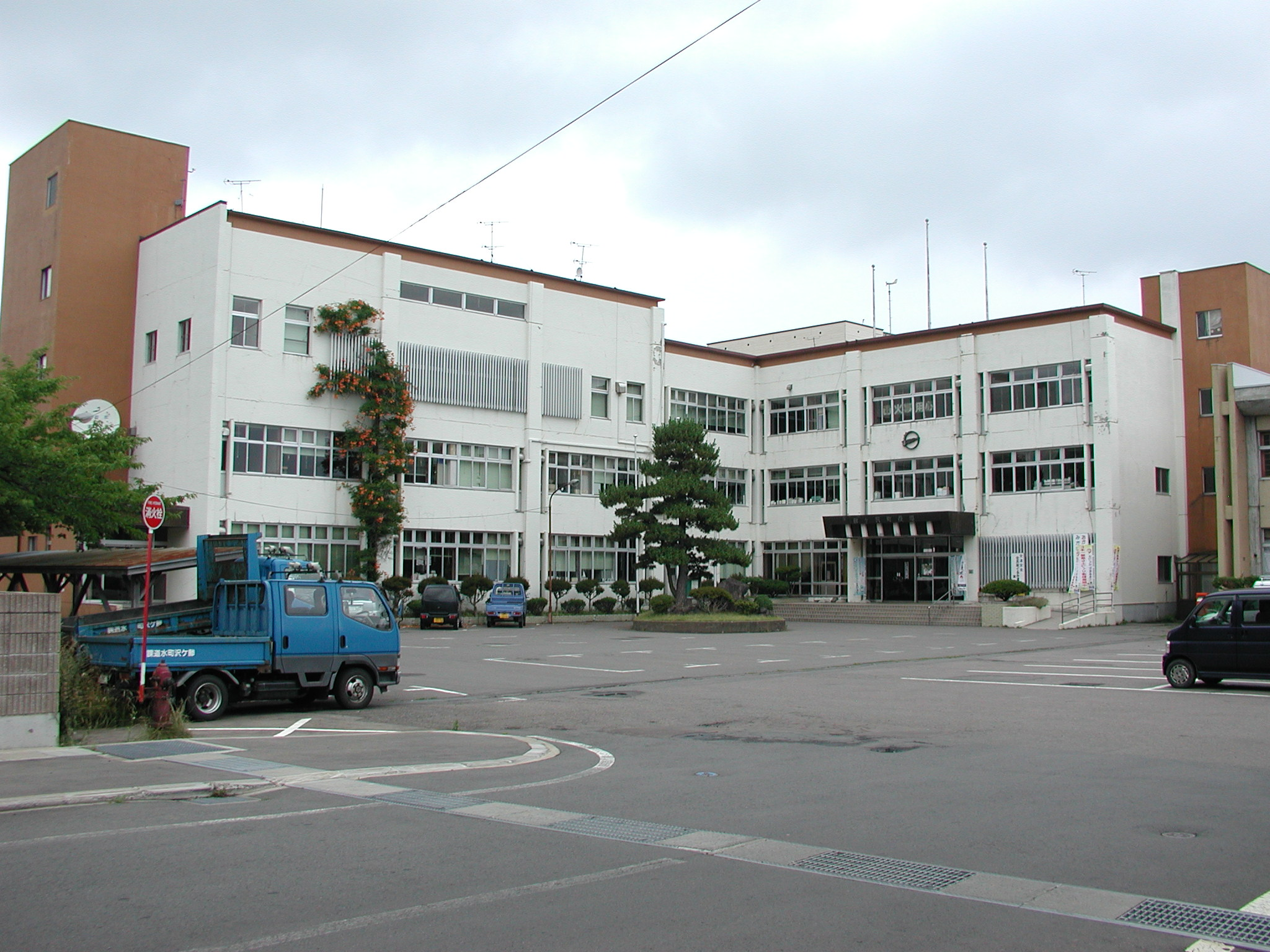
Former town office

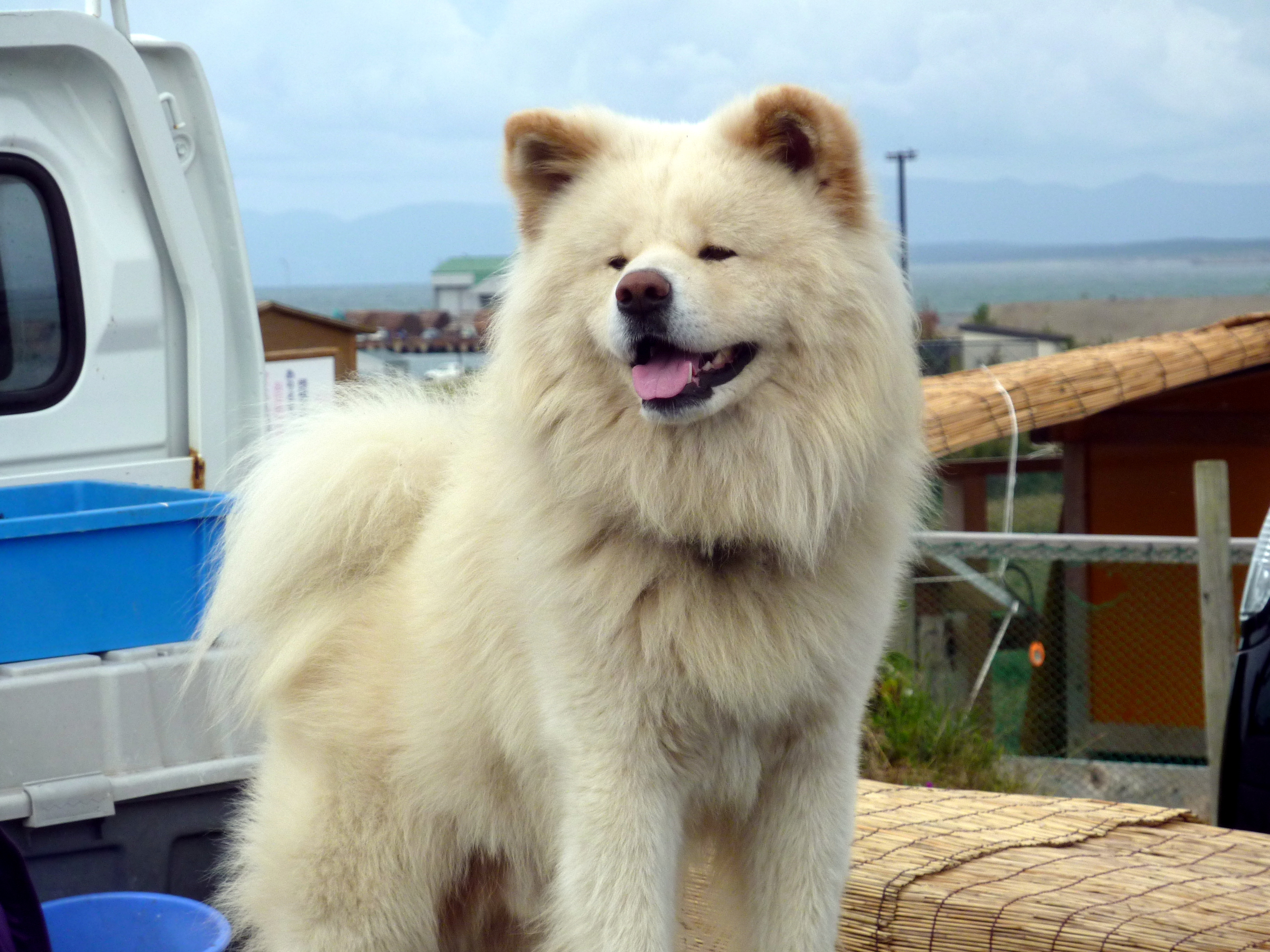
Wasao

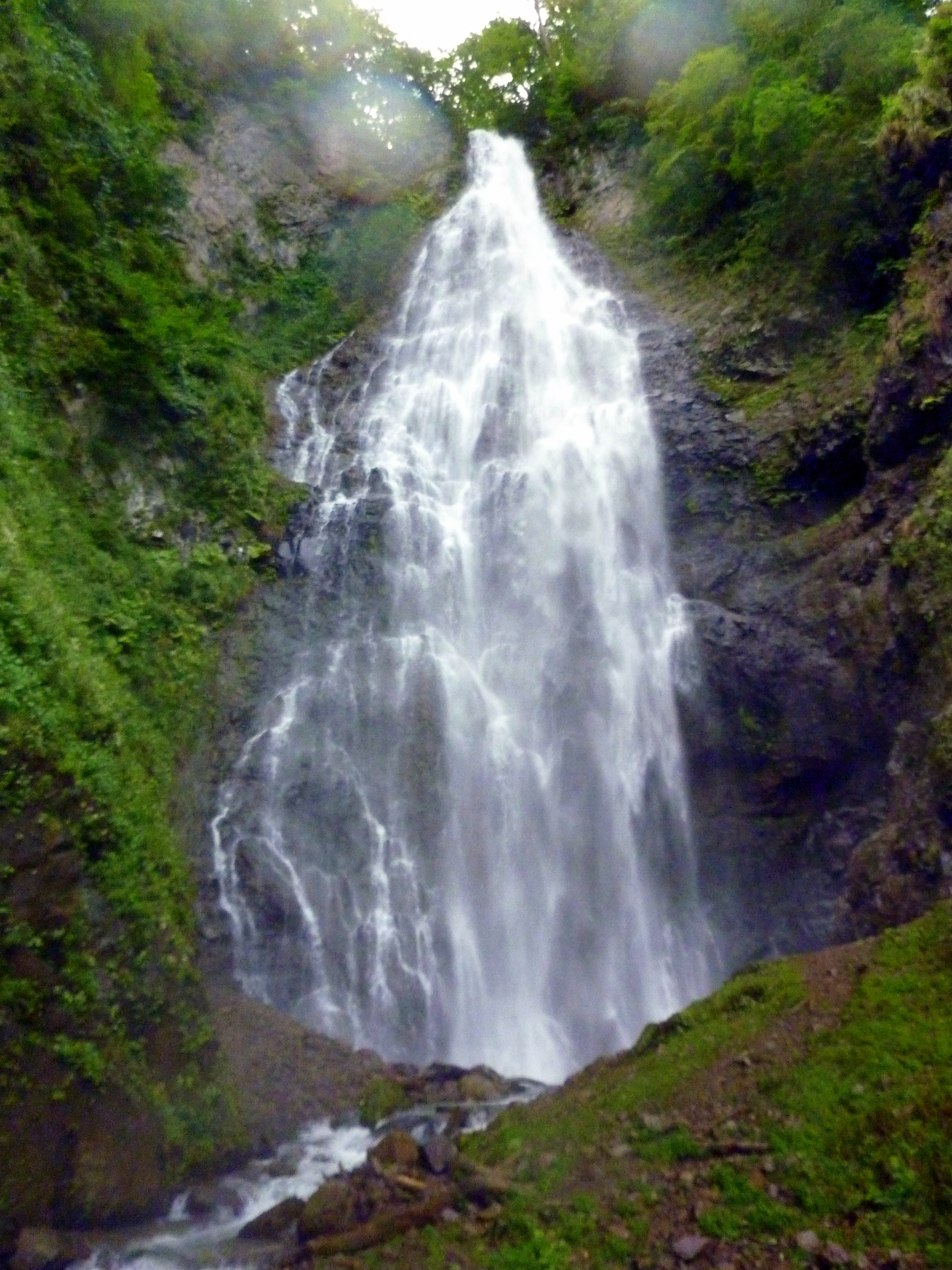
Kurokuma Falls

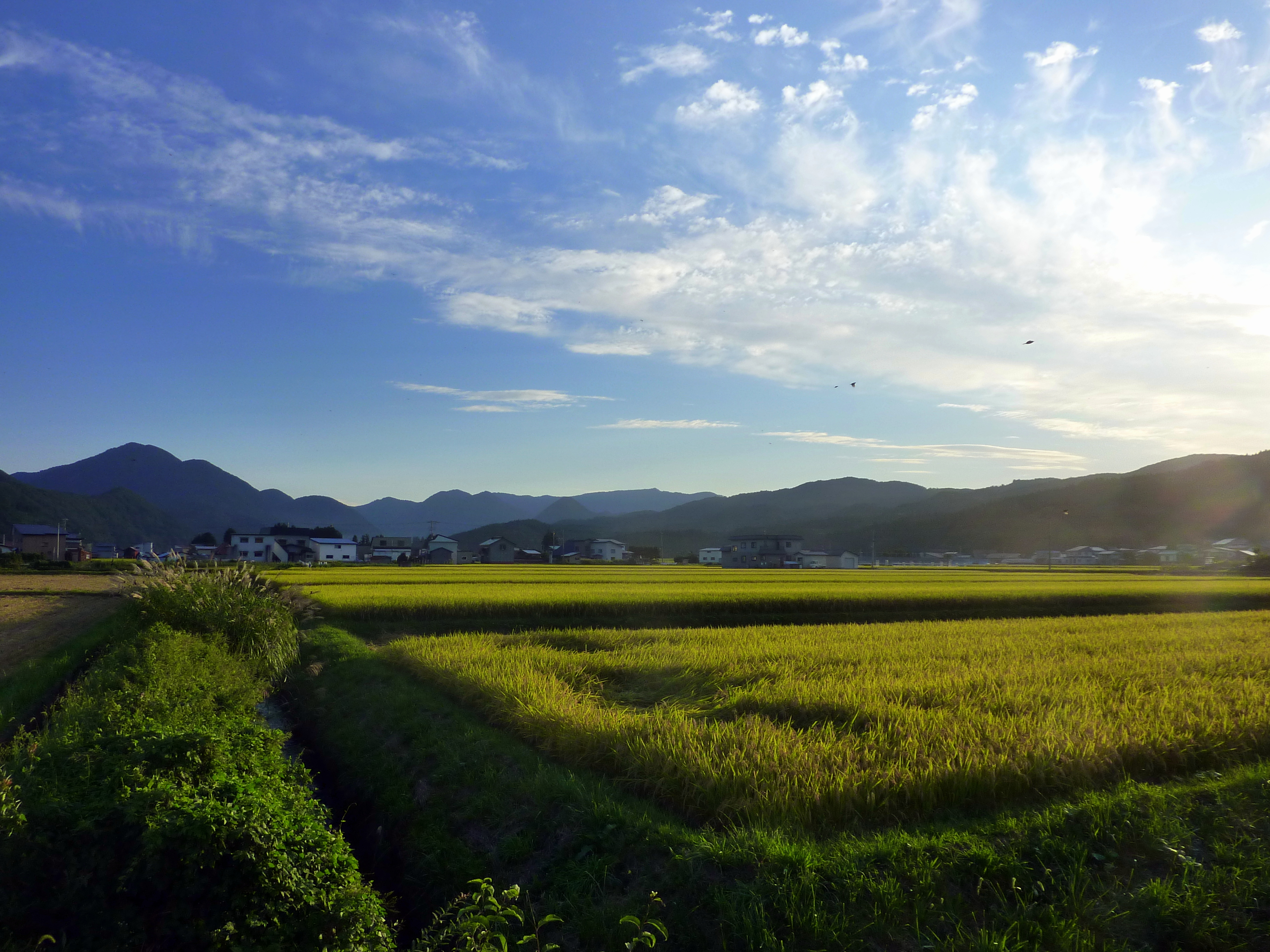
Rice fields near Minami Kanazawa

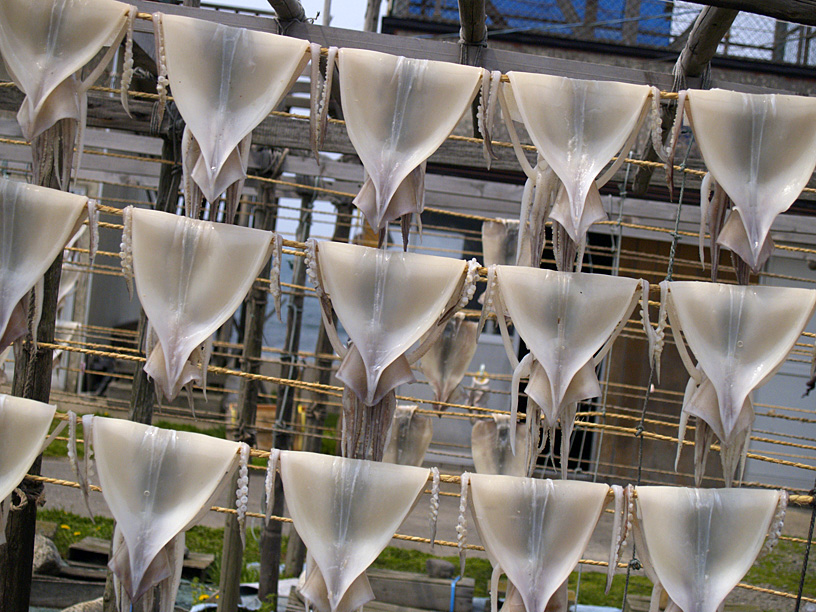
Dried Cuttlefish Curtain
