= Shirakami-Sanchi =

UNESCO World Heritage Site in Tōhoku, Japan

UNESCO World Heritage Site
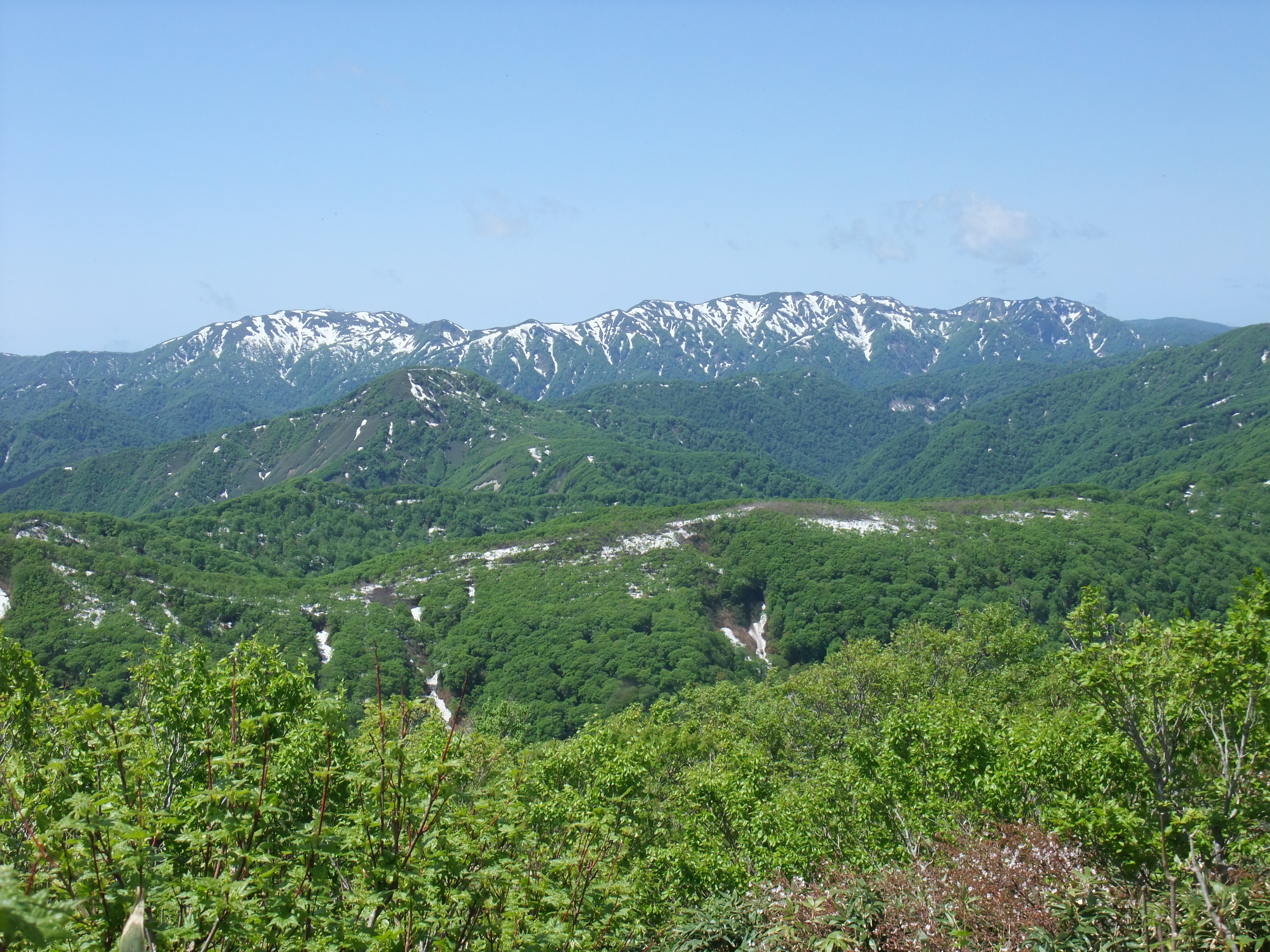

- Location within Tohoku, Japan
- Location: Northern Honshū, Japan
- Criteria: Natural: ix
- Reference: 663
- Inscription: 1993 (17th Session)
- Area: 16,971 ha (41,940 acres)
- Coordinates: 40°28′12″N 140°07′48″E

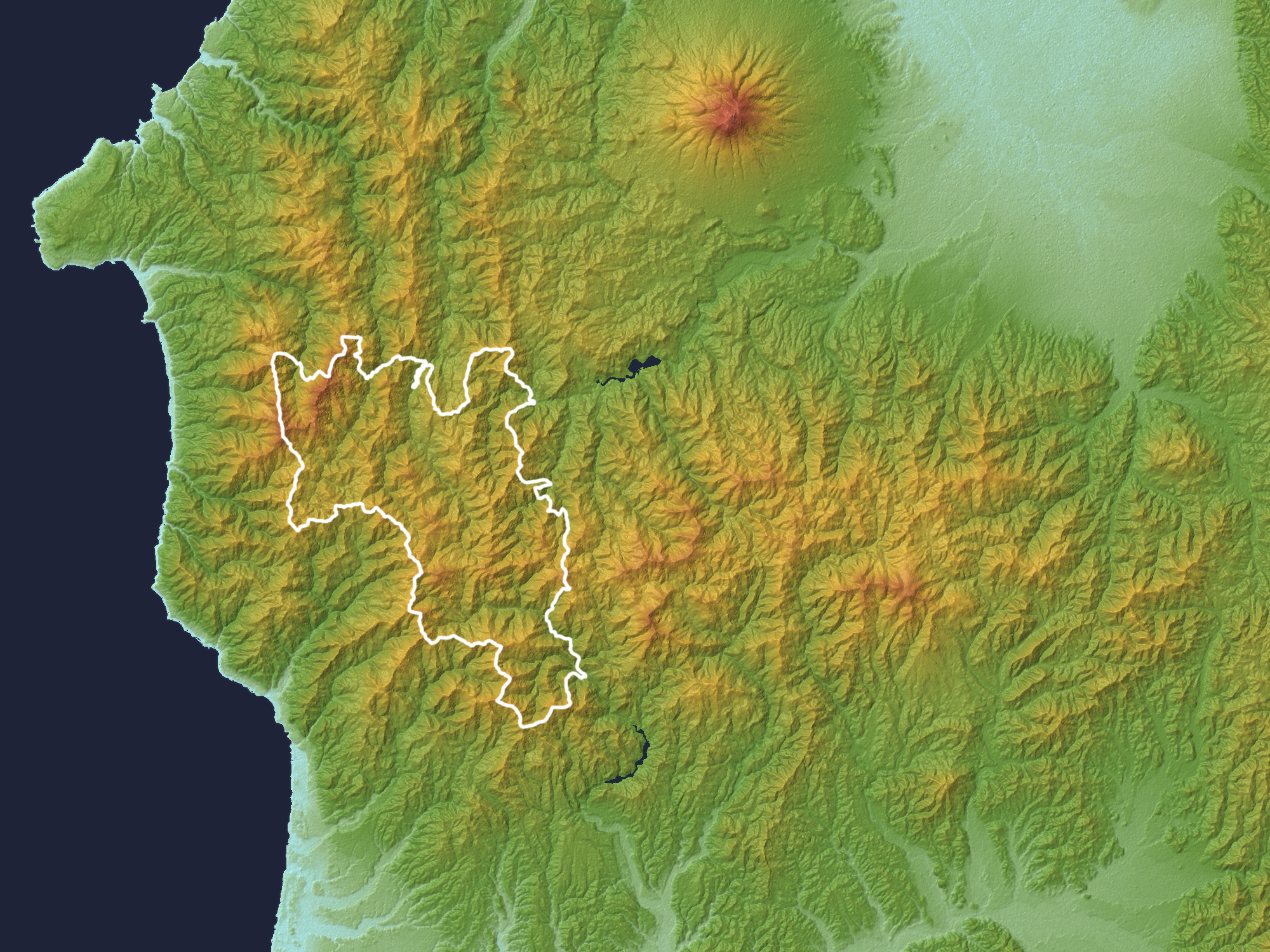
Shirakami Mountains Relief Map (with UNESCO World Heritage Site)

The Shirakami Mountains (White God Mountains) (Japanese: 白神山地, Hepburn: Shirakami-Sanchi) are a UNESCO World Heritage Site wilderness area in the Tōhoku region of northern Honshū, Japan. This mountainous area includes the last virgin forest of Japanese beech which once covered most of northern Japan. The area straddles both Akita and Aomori Prefectures, with three-fourths of it in Aomori Prefecture. Of the entire 130,000-hectare (500 sq mi) area, a tract covering 16,971-hectare (65.53 sq mi) was included in the list of World Heritage Sites in 1993. Fauna found in the area includes Japanese black bear, the Japanese serow, Japanese macaque and 87 species of birds. The Shirakami-Sanchi was one of the first sites entered on the World Heritage List in Japan, along with Yakushima, Himeji Castle, and Buddhist Monuments in the Hōryū-ji Area in 1993. Permission is needed from Forest Management to enter the heart of the Shirakami-Sanchi.

== Location ==
Shirakami-Sanchi is a wilderness area covering one third of the Shirakami mountain range, straddling both Akita and Aomori Prefectures, with three-fourths of it in Aomori Prefecture. It has the largest remaining virgin beech forest in East Asia and the last vigin forest of Fagus crenata in Japan. It is a remnant of the cool-temperate forests that have covered mountainous slopes of northern Japan since 8,000-10,000 years ago. Beech forests are distributed across the northern hemisphere and are believed to have originated from circumpolar vegetation prior to the last glaciation. The location near the Sea of Japan is characterized by a distinct heavy-snow environment, enabling the area to retain a complete ecosystem of stable climax beech forest, which has disappeared from most of the world.

The World Heritage Site is located within the boundaries of multiple municipalities Ajigasawa, Fujisato, Fukaura, and Nishimeya. Shirakami-Sanchi is bordered on the east by Tsugaru Quasi-National Park.

Of the entire 130,000-hectare (500 sq mi) area, a tract covering 16,971-hectare (65.53 sq mi) was included in the list of World Natural Heritage Sites in 1993. This World Natural Heritage area has a 10,139-hectare (39.15 sq mi) core zone and a surrounding 6,832-hectare (26.38 sq mi) buffer zone. Permission is needed from Forest Management to enter the core zone of Shirakami-Sanchi.

== Highlights ==
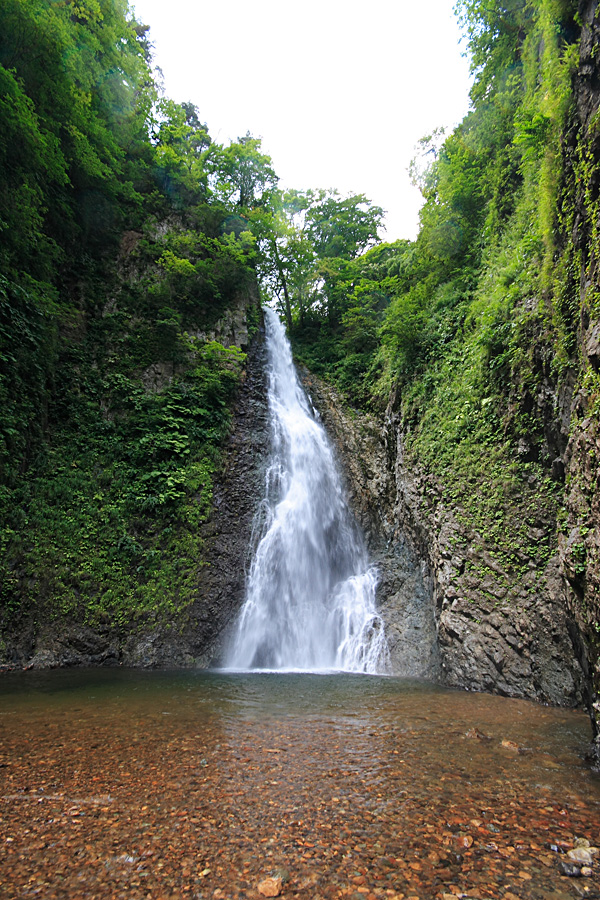
Anmon no taki

=== Primeval beech forest ===
Apart from beech trees, Katsura, Kalopanax, Japanese Hop-hornbeam and other species of tall deciduous trees are found in the forest. Stands of timber trees, such as Japanese cedar, have replaced many of the pristine forests in the Tōhoku region; however, within the borders of the Shirakami-Sanchi unmodified beech forests are densely and continuously distributed. The site is largely a wilderness with no roads, trails or man-made facilities. These beech forests have never been disturbed by farmers and remain in a state of preservation much greater than that of surrounding forests. The rugged terrain and lack of access has resulted in minimal logging of beech trees.Human activities are limited mainly to the boundary areas. The Matagi people are local Ainu-descended ethnic group with a keen knowledge of this area who hunt by a strict code, gather foods, and give eco-tours. Efforts by local communities, groups, and individuals, driven by years long interactions with nature, were crucial in making Shirakami-Sanchi a protected area.

While the biodiversity of Earth's primeval beech forests faced a substantial reduction around 2 million years ago due to continental glaciation, the forests in northern Japan, notably, were spared from this impact. As a result, these forests have retained their original ecological composition, serving as living time capsules of historical significance.

=== Landmarks ===
The Shadow Gate Falls (暗門の滝, Anmon no Taki) triple waterfalls of the World Heritage Site are within the borders of the Tsugaru Shirakami Prefectural Natural Park in the western part of Nishimeya, about 3.5 kilometers (2.2 mi) to the west of Miyama Lake. Shirakami-dake is a steep peak in Shirakami-Sanchi which is 1,235 m (4,052 ft) in height. The peak itself is not a part of the World Heritage Site and, as such, permission is not necessary to climb. Tengu-dake is another peak that can be climbed.

=== Animals ===
- Black woodpecker (natural monument)
- Japanese serow (a type of goat antelope) (natural monument)
- Mountain hawk-eagle
- Golden eagle
- Japanese macaque
- Dormouse
- Asiatic black bear
- 87 species of birds

== Geography ==
The Shirakami Mountains are primarily granite and sedimentary rock and also include rhyolite and quartz diorite. The prefecture has many waterfalls and rivers. The Anmon, Akashi, Kasuge, Oirase, Ou, and Sasauchi Rivers run through it. The area has an altitude ranging from 100 meters (330 ft) to 1,243 meters (4,078 ft) above sea level, with an average of 1,000 meters (3,300 ft). The area has many deep and very steep intersecting valleys. The mean annual temperature is 12 °C (54 °F) at lower altitudes. The average rainfall is 1,938 millimeters (76.3 in).

Shirakami Sanchi has a unique ecosystem within its cool-temperate deciduous broad-leaved forest area, with heavy winter snowfall. This heavy snowfall and rugged terrain allows for a diverse and relatively pristine flora and fauna due to minimal human impact. There are over 700 species of seed plants, featuring Japanese beech. These conditions allow evergreens to thrive in the undergrowth due to the heavy snows.

== See also ==
- List of World Heritage Sites in Japan
- Protected Forests (Japan)
- Tourism in Japan
