= Tsugaru Shirakami Prefectural Natural Park =

Park in southwest Aomori Prefecture, Japan

Coordinates: 40°37′46″N 140°6′38″E

- 津軽白神県立自然公園
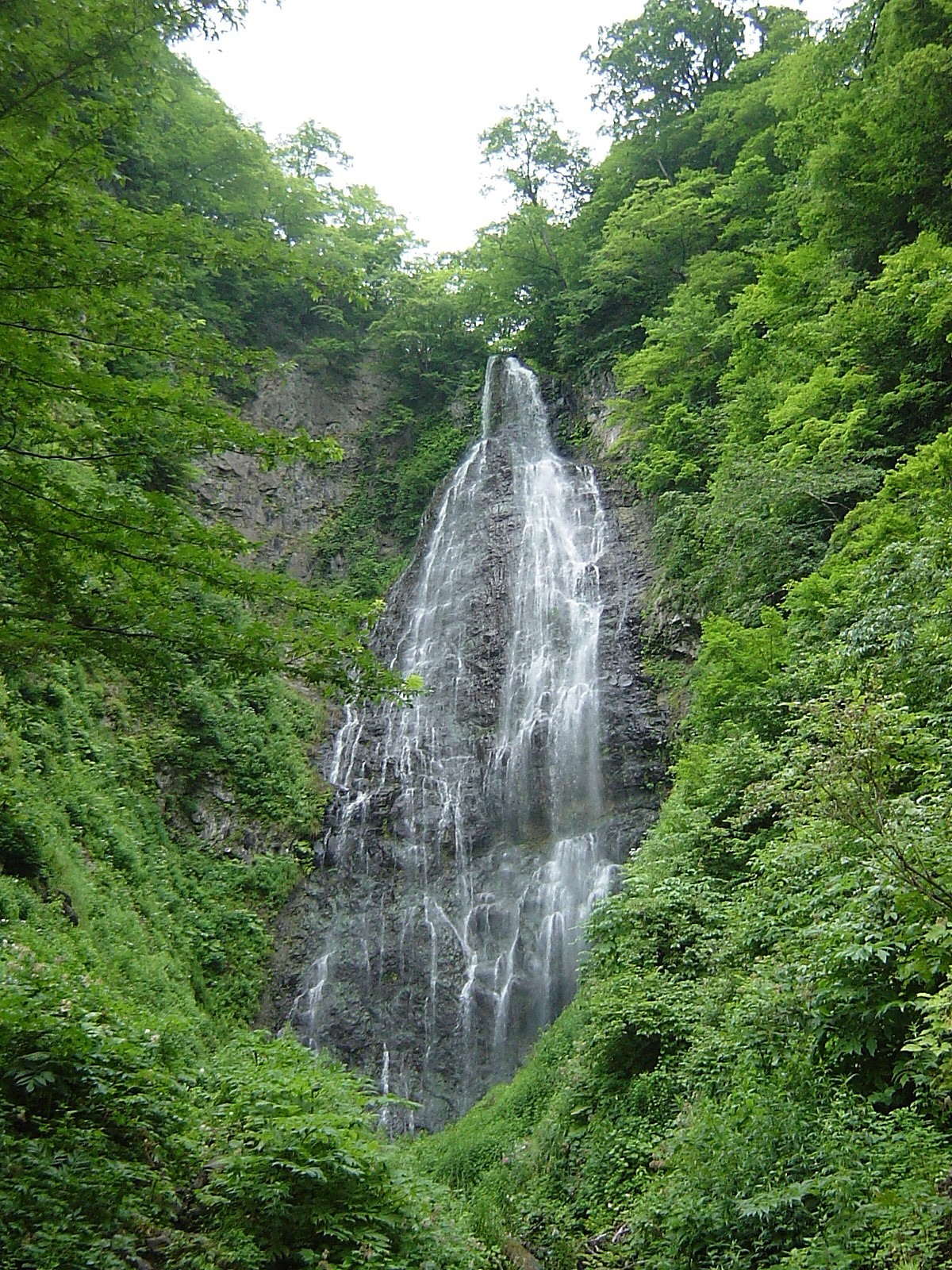
- Kurokuma Falls (85 m)
- Interactive map of Tsugaru Shirakami Prefectural Natural Park
- Location: Aomori Prefecture, Japan
- Nearest city: Ajigasawa, Nishimeya
- Area: 52.39 km^{2} (20.23 sq mi)
- Established: 7 July 1981

Tsugaru Shirakami Prefectural Natural Park (津軽白神県立自然公園, Tsugaru Shirakami Kenritsu Shizen Kōen) is a Prefectural Natural Park in southwest Aomori Prefecture, Japan. Established in 1981 as Akaishi Keiryū Anmon no Taki Prefectural Natural Park (赤石渓流暗門の滝県立自然公園), the park spans the borders of the municipalities of Ajigasawa and Nishimeya, and was renamed on 31 March 2017.

Gorges and waterfalls are the main feature of this national park.

== See also ==
- National Parks of Japan
