= Ōoka River =

River in Kanagawa prefecture, Japan

Coordinates: 35°27′26″N 139°38′18″E

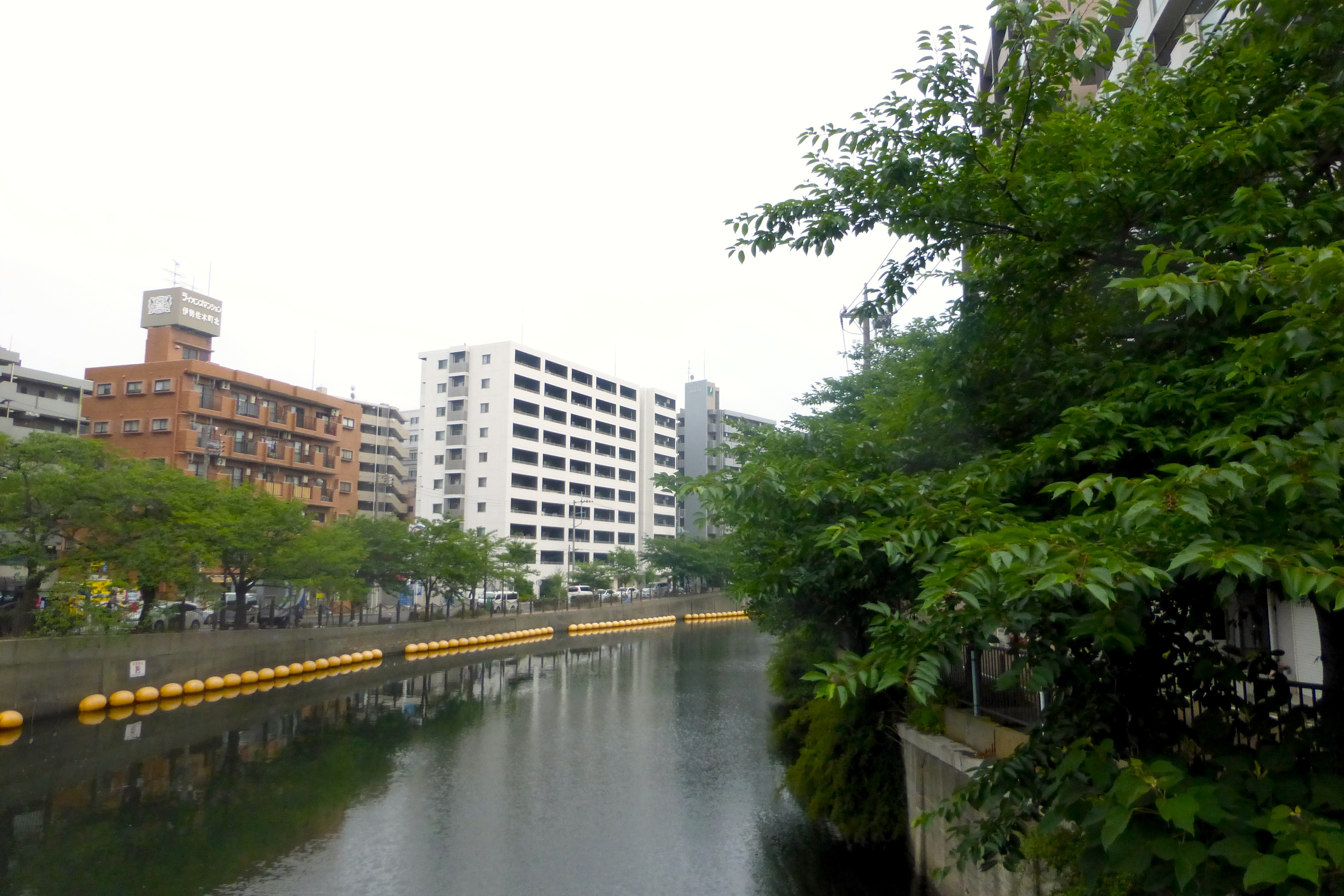
- The river in June 2015

The Ōoka River (大岡川, Ōoka-gawa) is a river that flows through Yokohama, Japan. It is 14 km long and over 80 bridges are built on the river. There are large numbers of cherry trees located near the river.

== Gallery ==
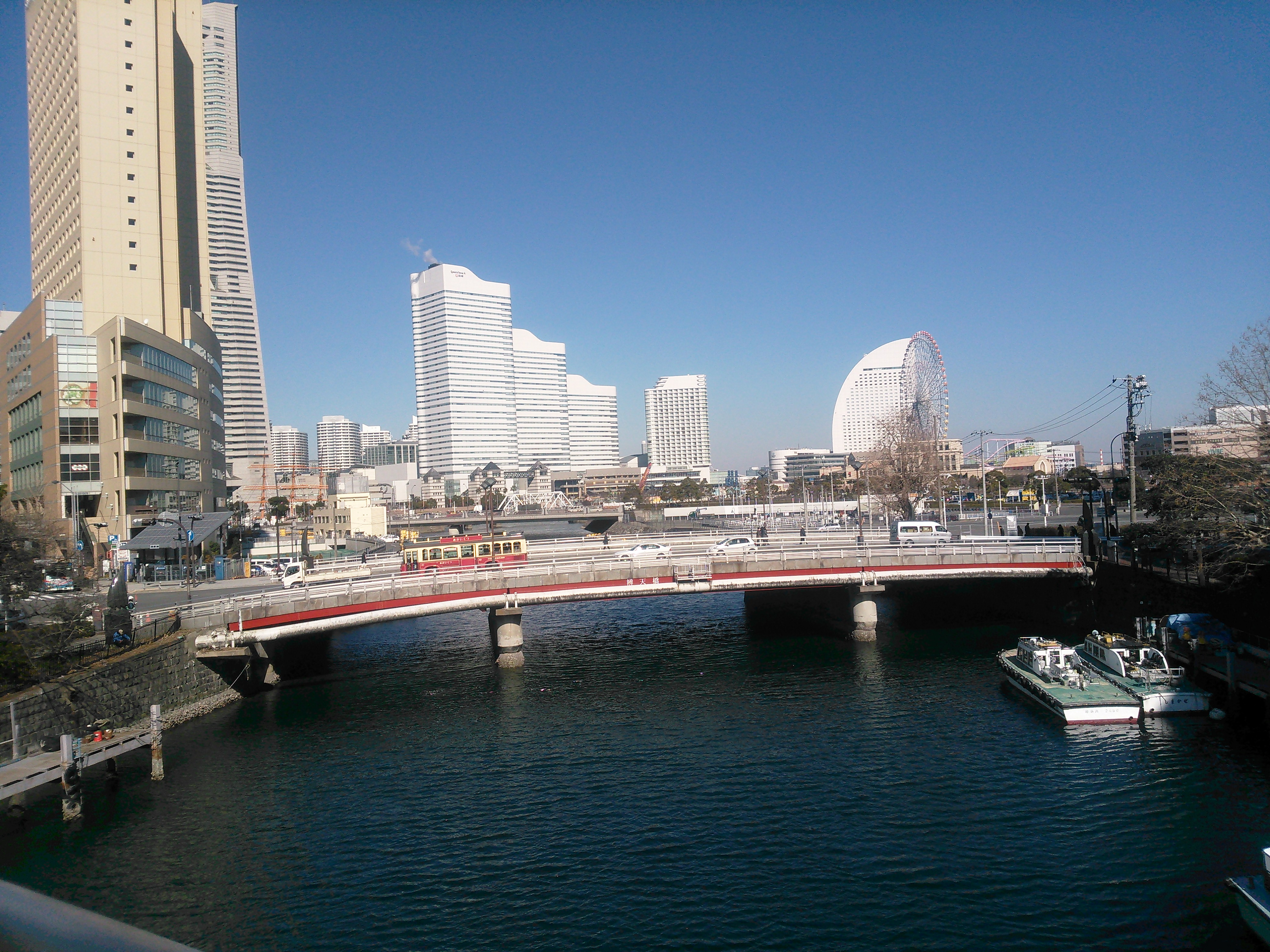
The mouth of the Ōoka River

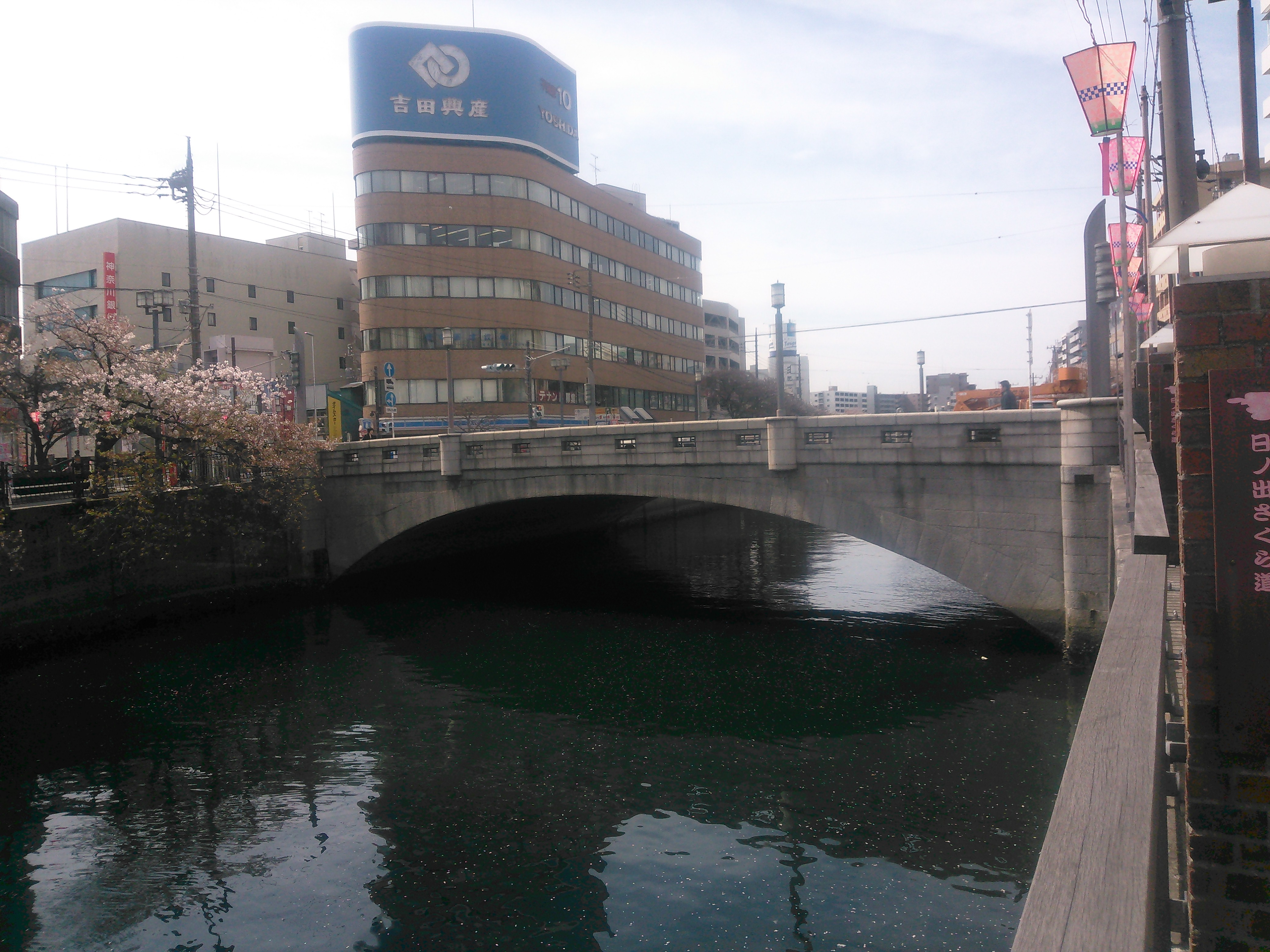
Chōjabashi (長者橋)

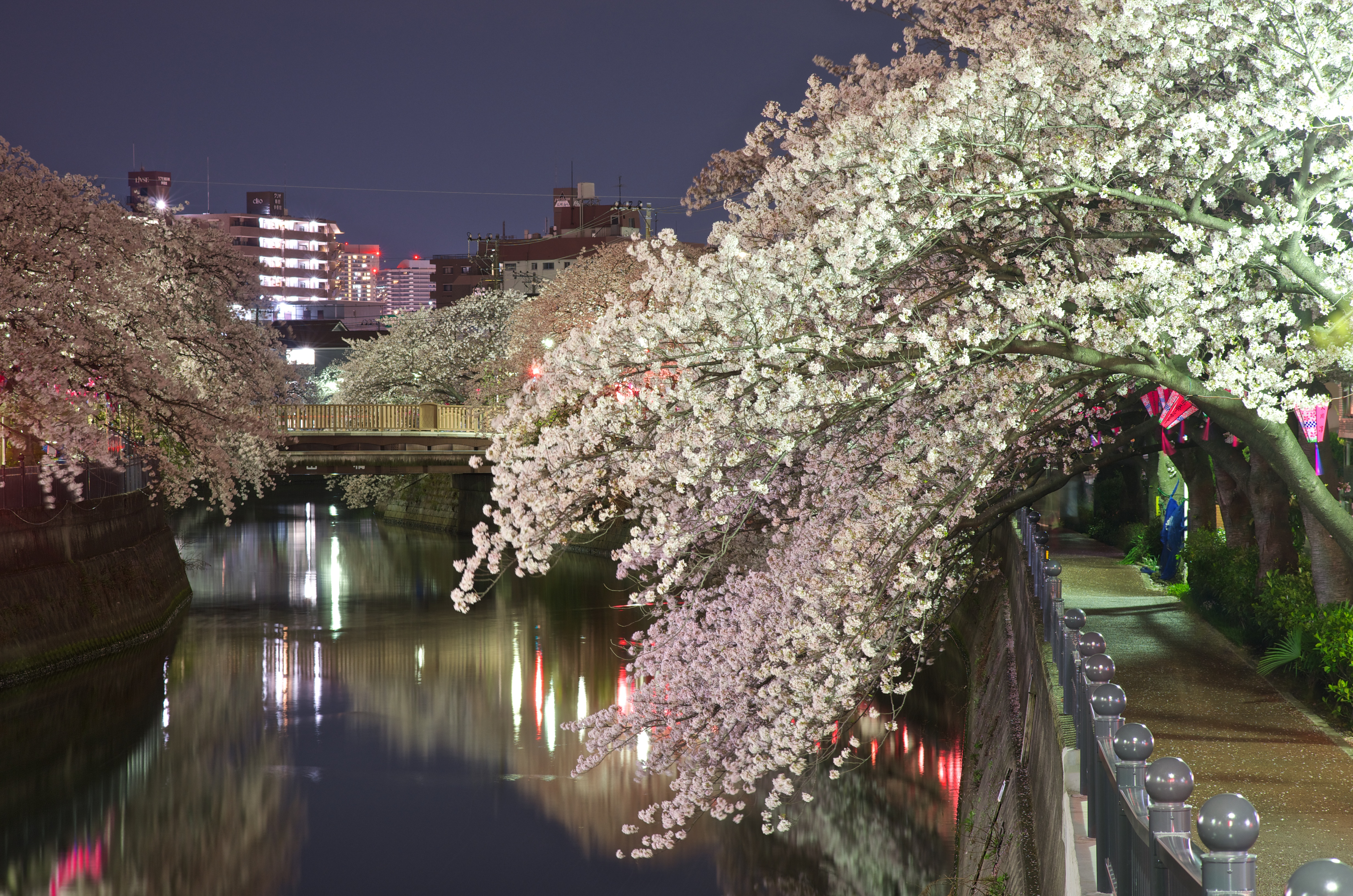
Idogayabashi (井土ヶ谷橋)

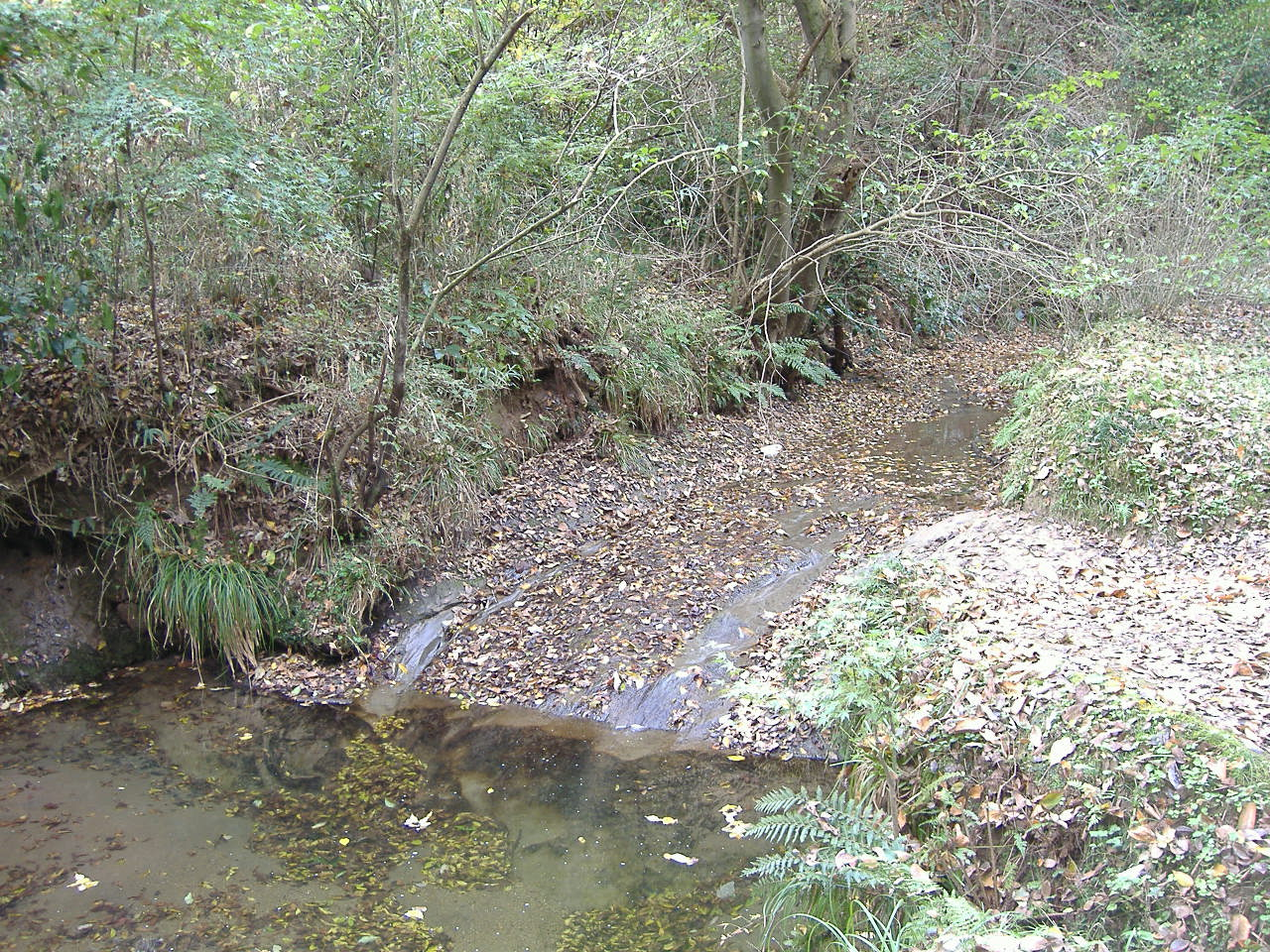
The source of the Ōoka River, in Hitorizawa-Chō (氷取沢町)
