= Bashamichi Station =

Railway station in Yokohama, Kanagawa prefecture, Japan

Coordinates: 35°27′0.3″N 139°38′10.87″E

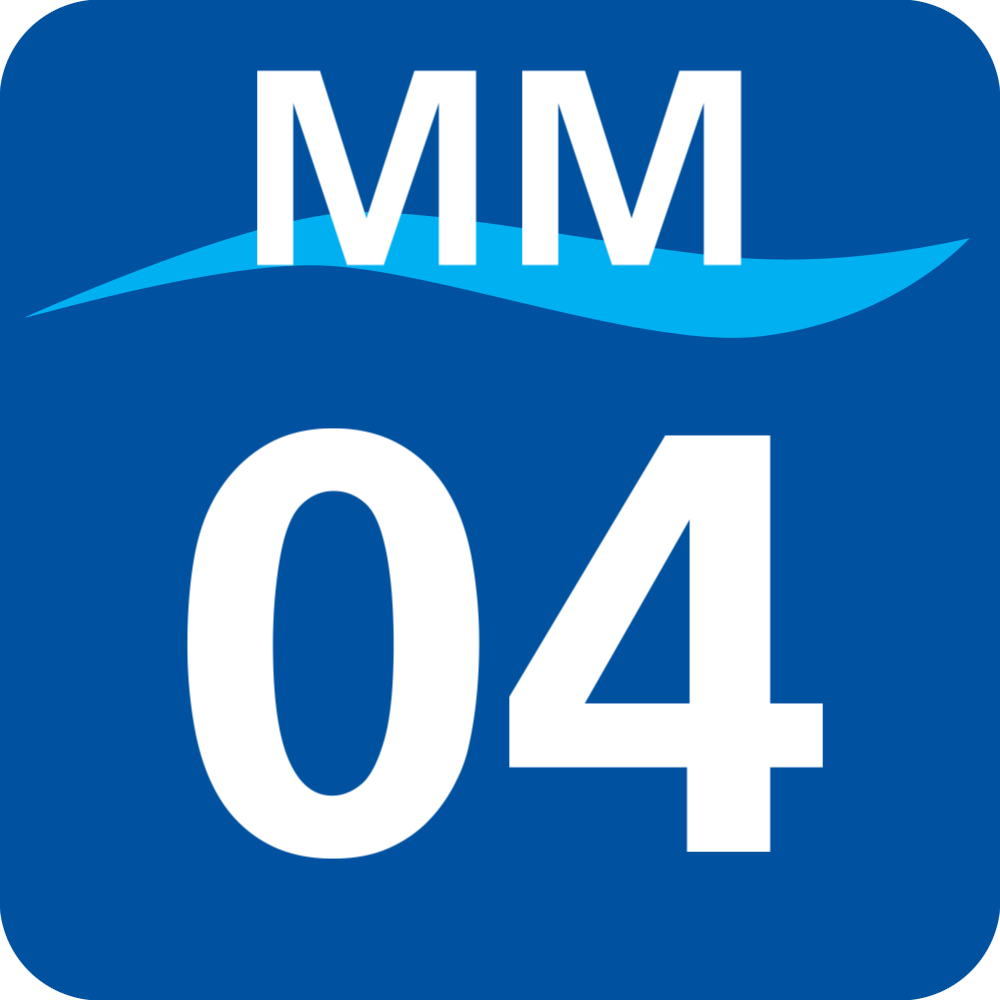
Bashamichi Station 馬車道駅

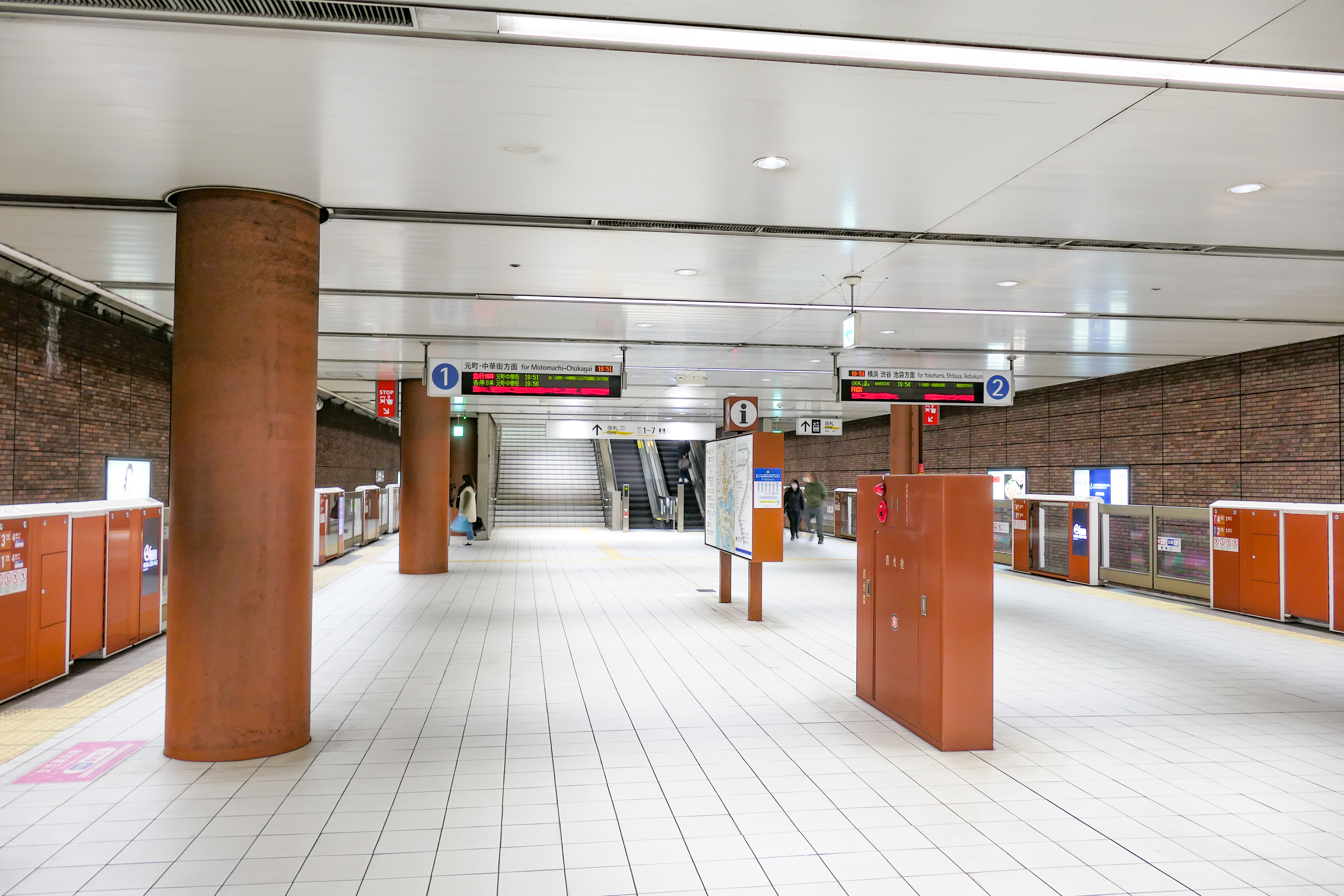
- Station platform, 18 December 2021

General information
- Location: 5-49 Honchō, Naka, Yokohama, Kanagawa （横浜市中区本町五丁目49） Japan
- Operator: Yokohama Minatomirai Railway Company
- Line: Minatomirai Line

History
- Opened: 1 February 2004

Passengers
- FY2011: 32,446 daily

Services
| Preceding station | Yokohama Minatomirai | Following station |
|---|---|---|
| Nihon-ōdōri towards Motomachi-Chūkagai | Minatomirai Line Commuter Express Express Local | Minatomirai towards Yokohama |
Location

Bashamichi Station (馬車道駅, Bashamichi-eki) is an underground railway station on the Minatomirai Line in Naka-ku, Yokohama, Kanagawa Prefecture, Japan operated by the third-sector railway operating company Yokohama Minatomirai Railway.

== Lines ==
Bashamichi Station is served by the 4.1 km underground Minatomirai Line from Yokohama to Motomachi-Chukagai, and is 2.6 km from the starting point of the Minatomirai Line at Yokohama Station. Trains through-run to and from the Tokyu Toyoko Line from Shibuya Station and beyond on the Tokyo Metro Fukutoshin Line and Tobu Tojo Line and Seibu Ikebukuro Line.

== Station layout ==
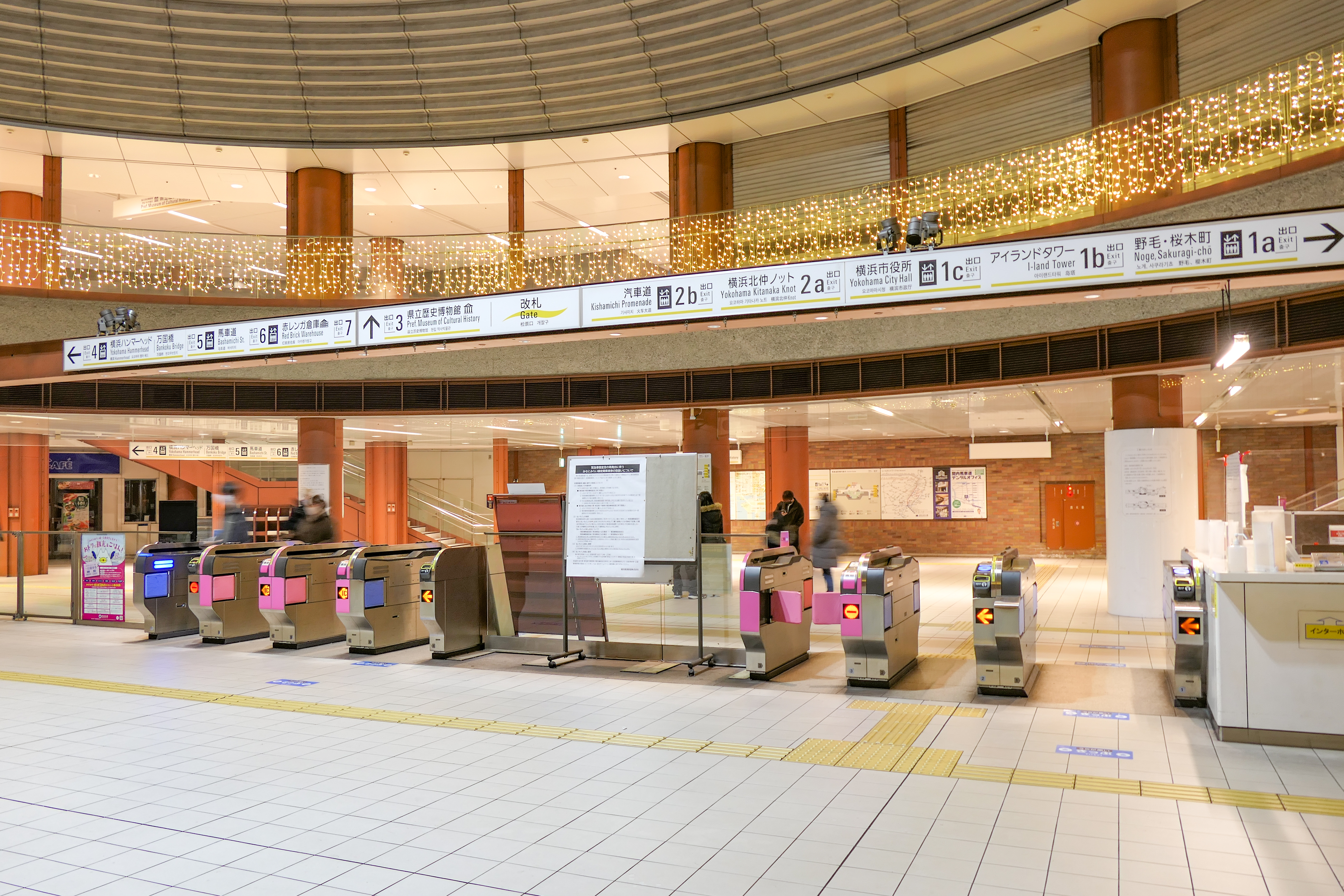
The ticket barriers, 18 December 2021

Bashamichi Station is an underground station with a single island platform serving two tracks.

=== Platforms ===
| 1 | Minatomirai Line | for Motomachi-Chūkagai |
| 2 | Minatomirai Line | for Minatomirai and Yokohama; Tokyu Toyoko Line for Shibuya; Tokyo Metro Fukutoshin Line for Shinjuku-sanchōme, Ikebukuro, and Wakōshi; Tobu Tojo Line for Kawagoeshi and Shinrin-kōen; Seibu Ikebukuro Line for Hannō |

== History ==
Bashamichi Station opened on 1 February 2004, coinciding with the opening of the Minatomirai Line.

== Passenger statistics ==
In fiscal 2011, the station was used by an average of 32,446 passengers daily.

== Surrounding area ==
- Kanagawa Prefectural Museum of Cultural History
- NYK Maritime Museum
- Yokohama Red Brick Warehouse
