= Nihon-ōdōri Station =

Railway station in Yokohama, Japan

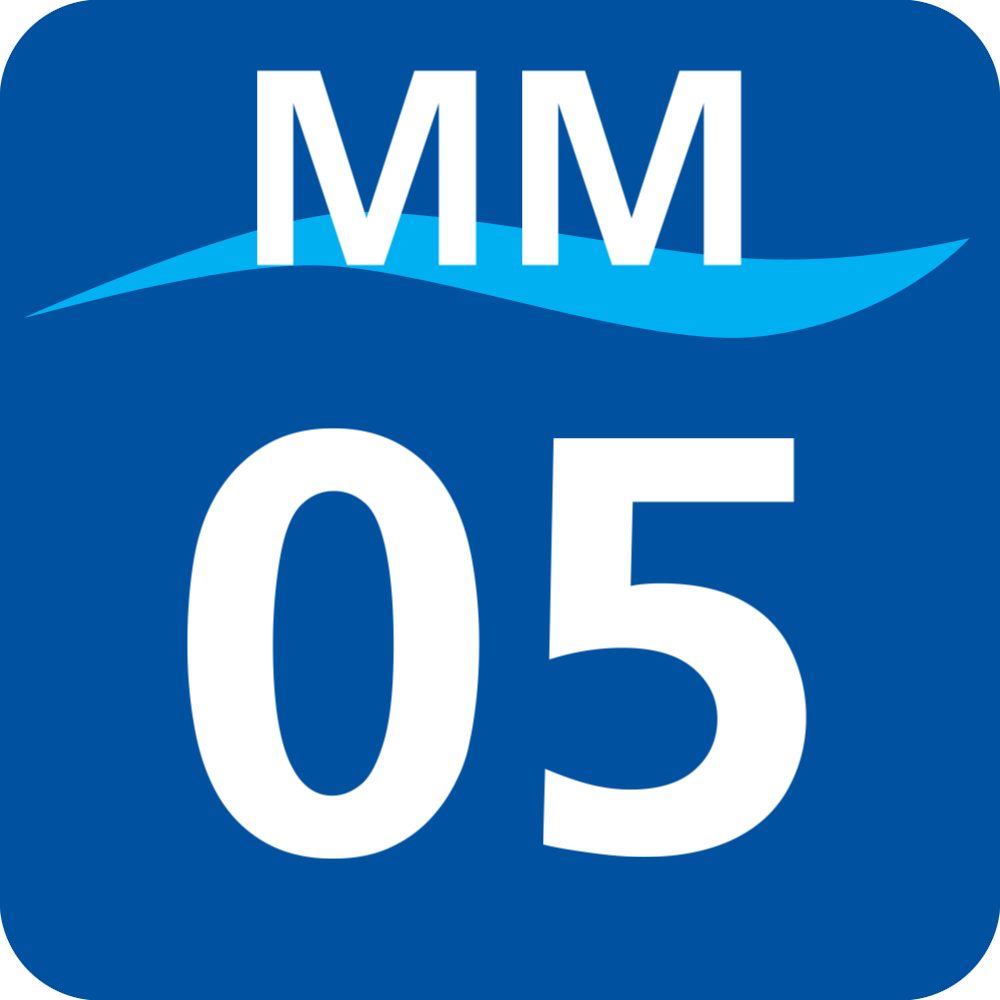
Nihon-ōdōri Station 日本大通り駅

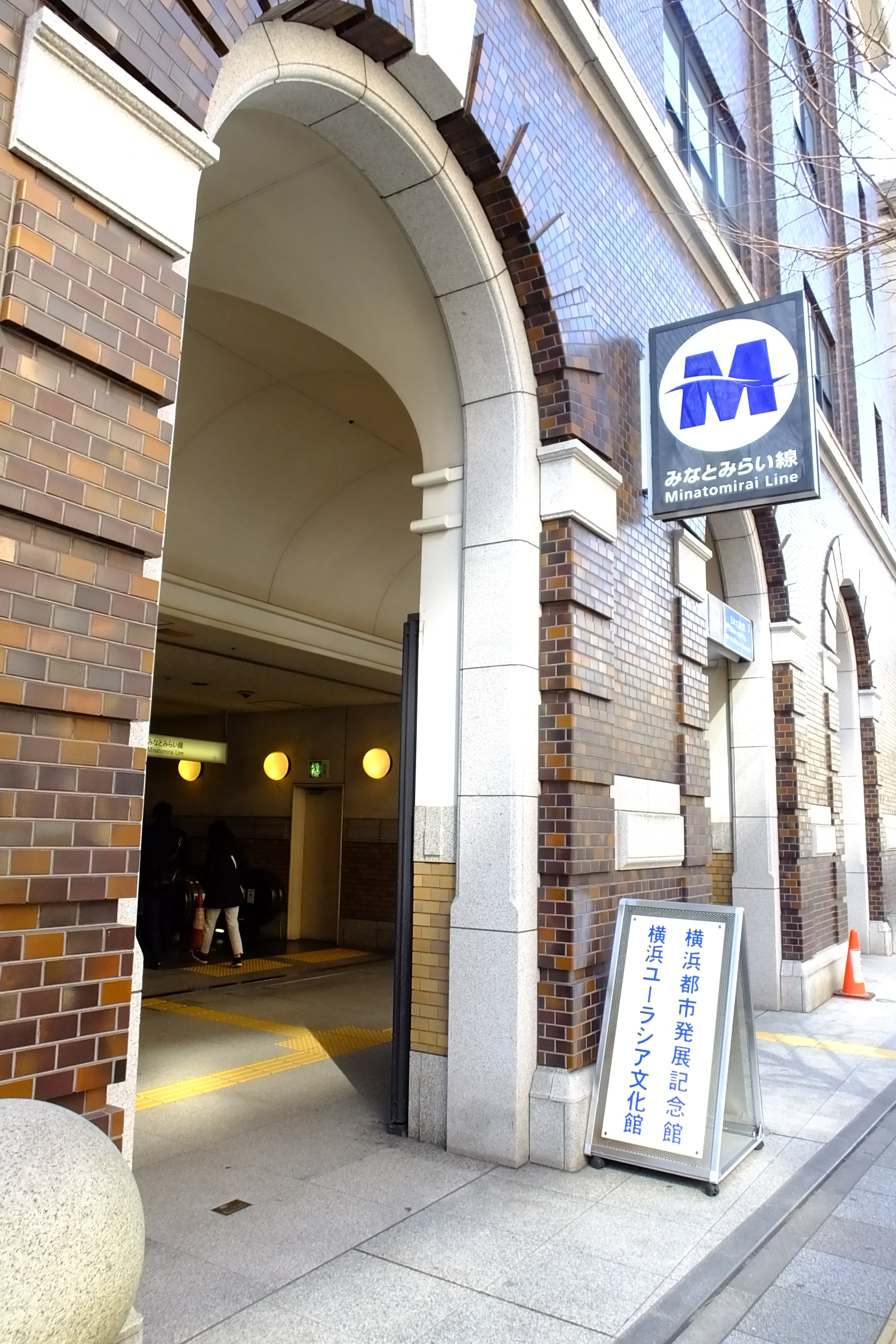
- The surface-level entrance in February 2015

General information
- Location: 9 Nihon-ōdōri, Naka-ku, Yokohama-shi, Kanagawa-ken; Japan
- Coordinates: 35°26′48.46″N 139°38′33.53″E
- Operator: Yokohama Minatomirai Railway Company
- Line: Minatomirai Line
- Distance: 3.2 km from Yokohama
- Platforms: 1 island platform
- Tracks: 2

Construction
- Structure type: Underground

History
- Opened: 1 February 2004

Passengers
- FY2011: 21,879 daily

Services
| Preceding station | Yokohama Minatomirai | Following station |
|---|---|---|
| Motomachi-Chūkagai Terminus | Minatomirai Line Commuter Express Express Local | Bashamichi towards Yokohama |
Location
- Location within Kanagawa Prefecture Location within Japan

Nihon-ōdōri Station (日本大通り駅, Nihon-ōdōri-eki) is an underground railway station on the Minatomirai Line in Naka-ku, Yokohama, Kanagawa Prefecture, Japan, operated by the third-sector railway operating company Yokohama Minatomirai Railway Company. Its official name is Nihon-ōdōri (Kenchō-Ōsanbashi) Station (日本大通り（県庁・大さん橋）駅, Nihon-ōdōri (Kenchō-Ōsanbashi)-eki), including the sub-name in parentheses.

== Lines ==
Nihon-ōdōri Station is served by the 4.1 km underground Minatomirai Line from Yokohama to Motomachi-Chukagai, and is 3.2 km from the starting point of the line at Yokohama Station. Trains through-run to and from the Tokyu Toyoko Line from Shibuya Station and beyond on the Tokyo Metro Fukutoshin Line and Tobu Tojo Line and Seibu Ikebukuro Line.

== Station layout ==
Nihon-ōdōri Station is an underground station with a single island platform serving two tracks.

=== Platforms ===
| 1 | Minatomirai Line | for Motomachi-Chūkagai |
| 2 | Minatomirai Line | for Minatomirai and Yokohama; Tokyu Toyoko Line for Shibuya; Tokyo Metro Fukutoshin Line for Shinjuku-sanchōme, Ikebukuro, and Wakōshi; Tobu Tojo Line for Kawagoeshi and Shinrin-kōen; Seibu Ikebukuro Line for Hannō |

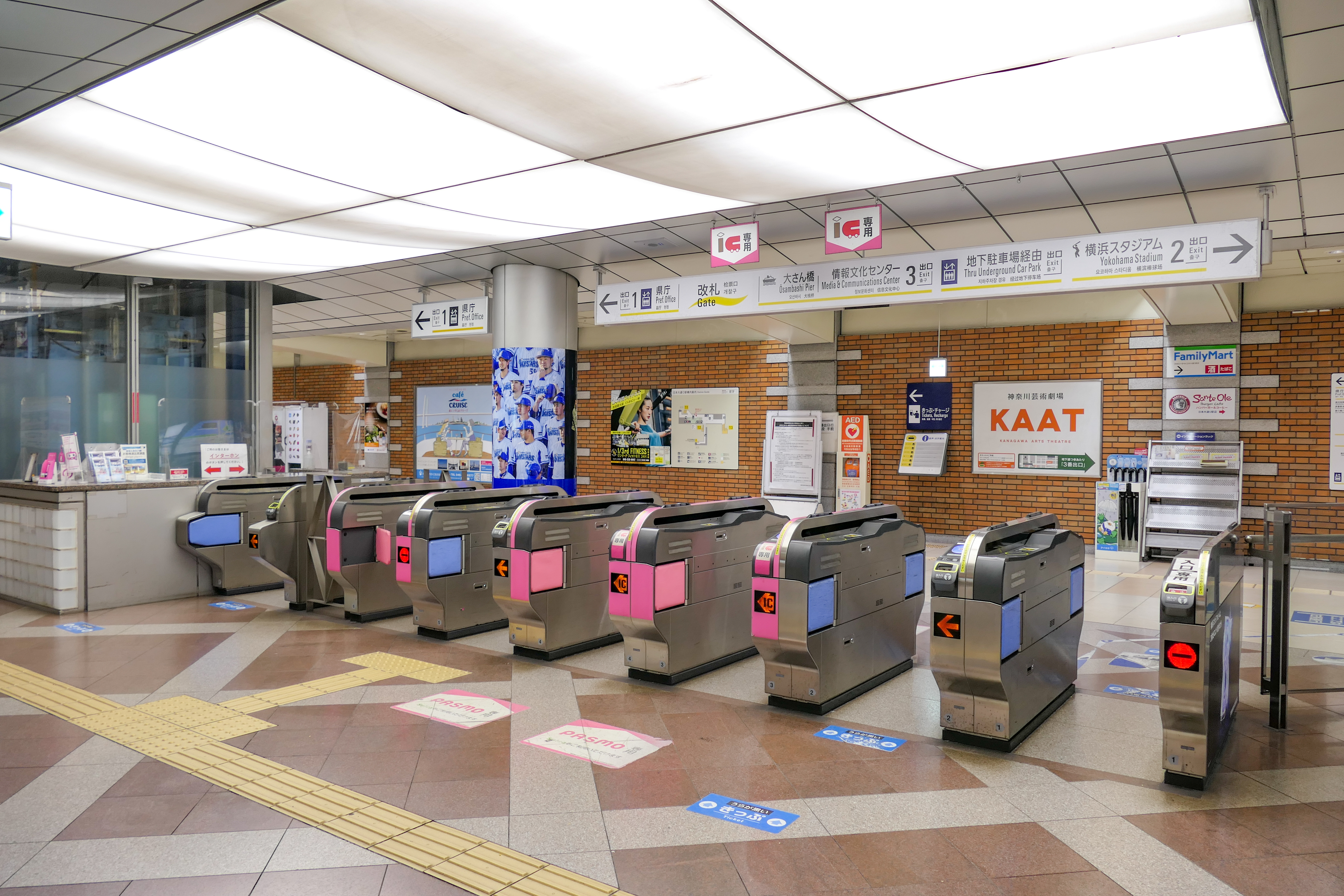
The ticket barriers on 18 December 2021

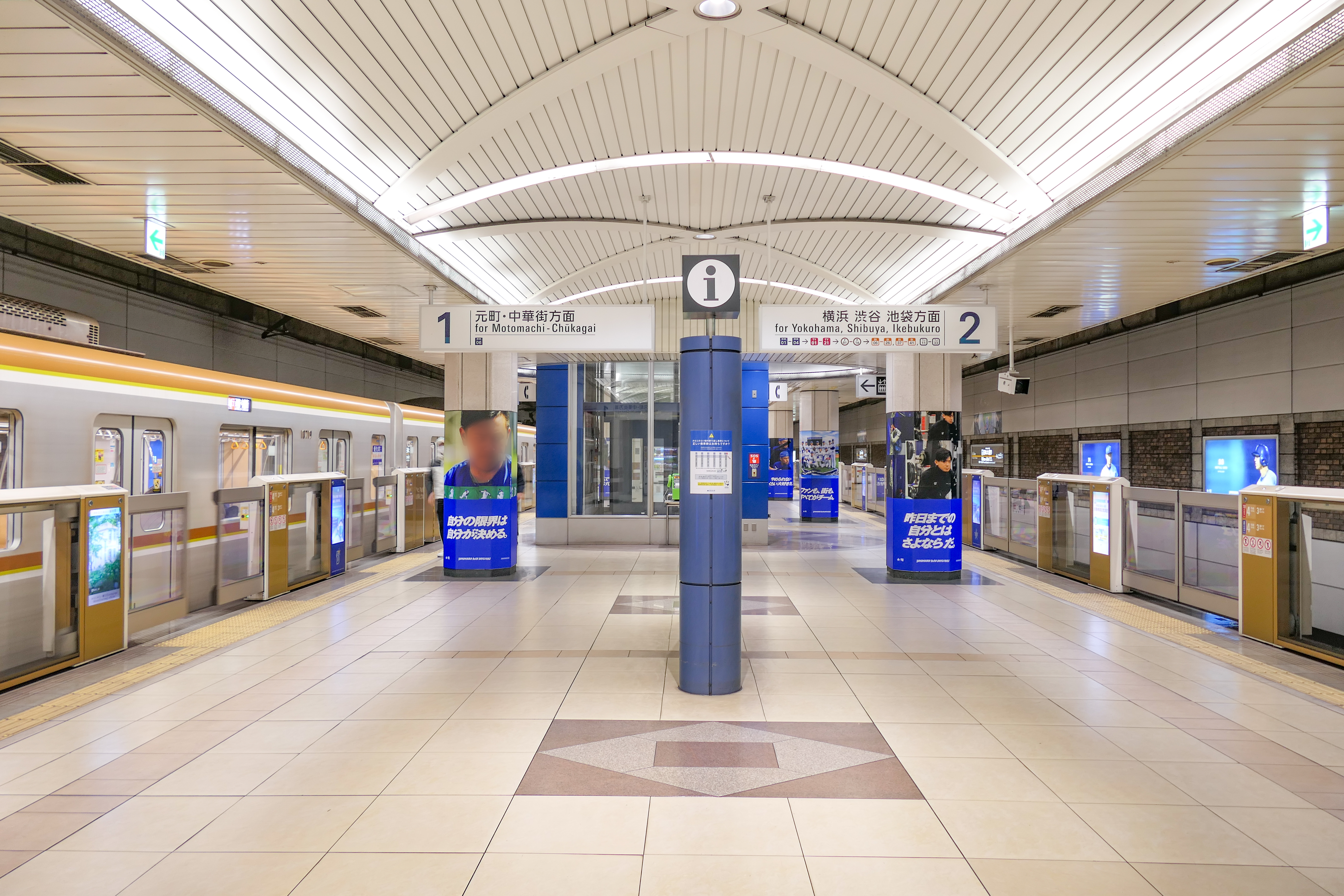
The platform on 18 December 2021

== History ==
Nihon-ōdōri Station opened on 1 February 2004, coinciding with the opening of the Minatomirai Line.

== Passenger statistics ==
In fiscal 2011, the station was used by an average of 21,879 passengers daily.

== Surrounding area ==
- Yokohama Stadium - 2-minute walk, heading south of the station
- Osanbashi Pier - 5-minute walk, heading north of the station
- Kanagawa Prefectural Government ("King's Tower") - at the Kenchō Exit (western end of the station)
- Naka Ward Office - 2-minute walk, heading south of the station
- Yokohama Archives of History

== See also ==
- List of railway stations in Japan
