= NYK Maritime Museum =

Maritime museum in Yokohama, Japan

Coordinates: 35°27′1″N 139°38′22″E

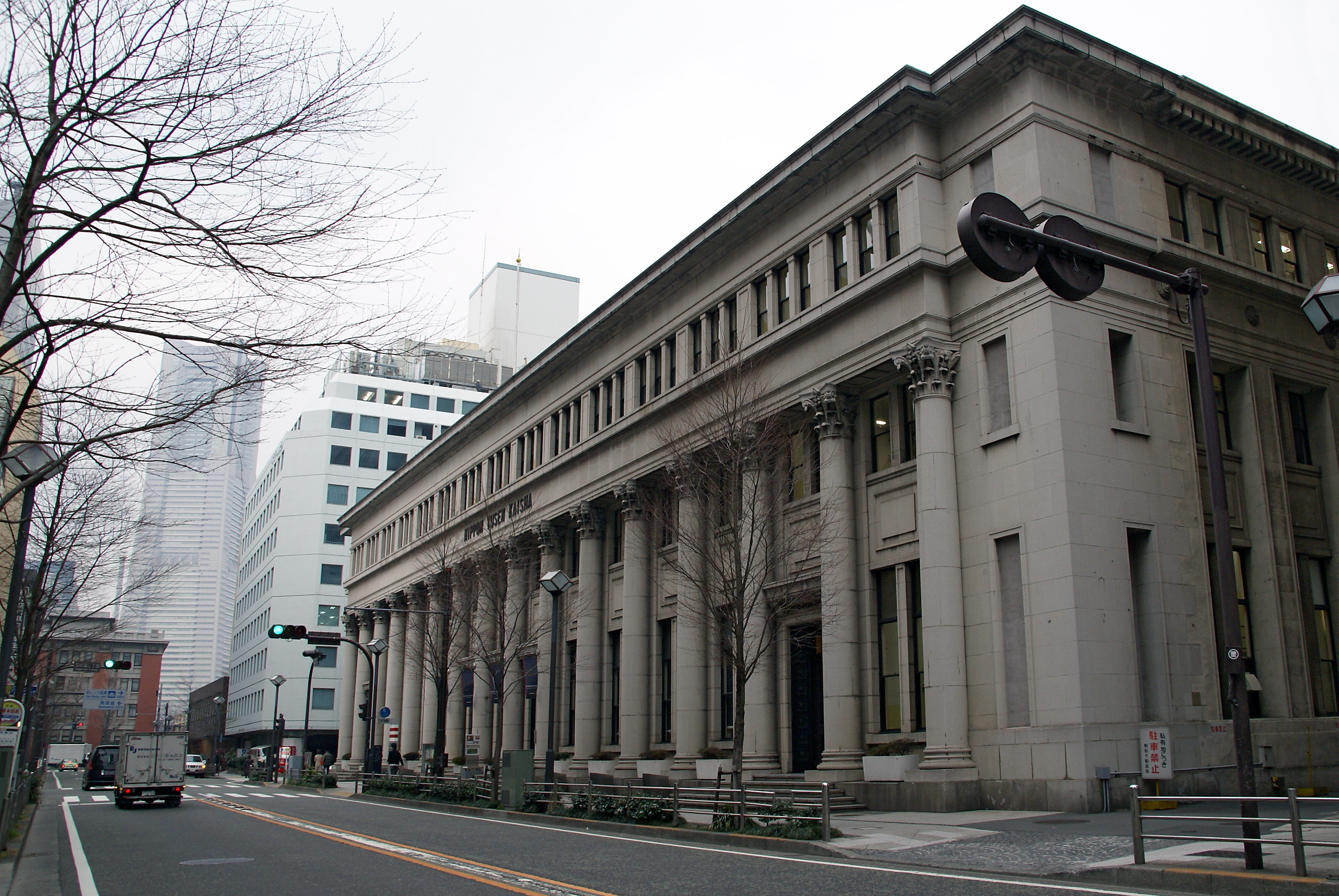
- NYK Maritime Museum, March 2007
- Established: 1993
- Location: 3-9 Kaigan-dōri, Naka-ku, Yokohama, Japan
- Owner: Nippon Yusen
- Public transit access: Bashamichi Station
- Website: Official website

The NYK Maritime Museum (日本郵船歴史博物館, Nippon Yūsen Rekishi Hakubutsukan) is a museum in Naka-ku, Yokohama, Kanagawa Prefecture, Japan, dedicated to the maritime history of Japan and of the museum's operator, shipping company Nippon Yūsen Kabushiki Kaisha ("NYK Line"). It was opened in 1993.

== Access ==
The museum is a two-minute walk from Bashamichi Station on the Minatomirai Line.

== See also ==
- Hikawa Maru
- Japan Coast Guard Museum Yokohama
