= Yokohama Jogakuin Junior and Senior High School =

School in Yokohama, Japan

Coordinates: 35.4362°N 139.6405°E

- 横浜女学院中学校・高等学校
- The school in 2009

Information
- Religious affiliation: Protestant
- Established: 1947; 79 years ago
- Website: www.yjg.y-gakuin.ed.jp

Yokohama Jogakuin Junior and Senior High School (横浜女学院中学校・高等学校, Tokohama Jogauin Chūgakkō Kōtōgakkō) is a Christian private girls' secondary school in Naka-ku, Yokohama, Japan,

It was founded on September 13, 1947, as a post-World War II combination of a former Shinto girls' senior high school and a Buddhist girls' senior high school and was established by Tadashi Kaneko (died 2000). As of 2019 the teaching staff numbers over 100 and the student body numbers over 1,000.
