= Yokohama Jazz Festival =

Jazz festival

Coordinates: 35°22′46″N 139°38′49″E

The Yokohama Honmoku Jazz Festival (YOKOHAMA本牧ジャズ祭) is an annual event in Japan. With sponsorship from Yokohama city and organizations such as the print and broadcast media, the event has taken place since 1981. The 26th festival is scheduled for August 27, 2006 at the Honmoku Citizens' Park, Naka-ku, Yokohama.

The Honmoku Festival features artists from around the world. Yokohama claims to be the place where jazz was introduced to Japan. Every year in late August, the Annual Jazz Festival is held at the Honmoku Shimin Park Open-air Stage (Honmoku Shimin Koen).
