= Japan Coast Guard Museum Yokohama =

Museum in Naka-ku, Yokohama, Kanagawa Prefecture, Japan

Coordinates: 35°27′15.5″N 139°38′39.5″E

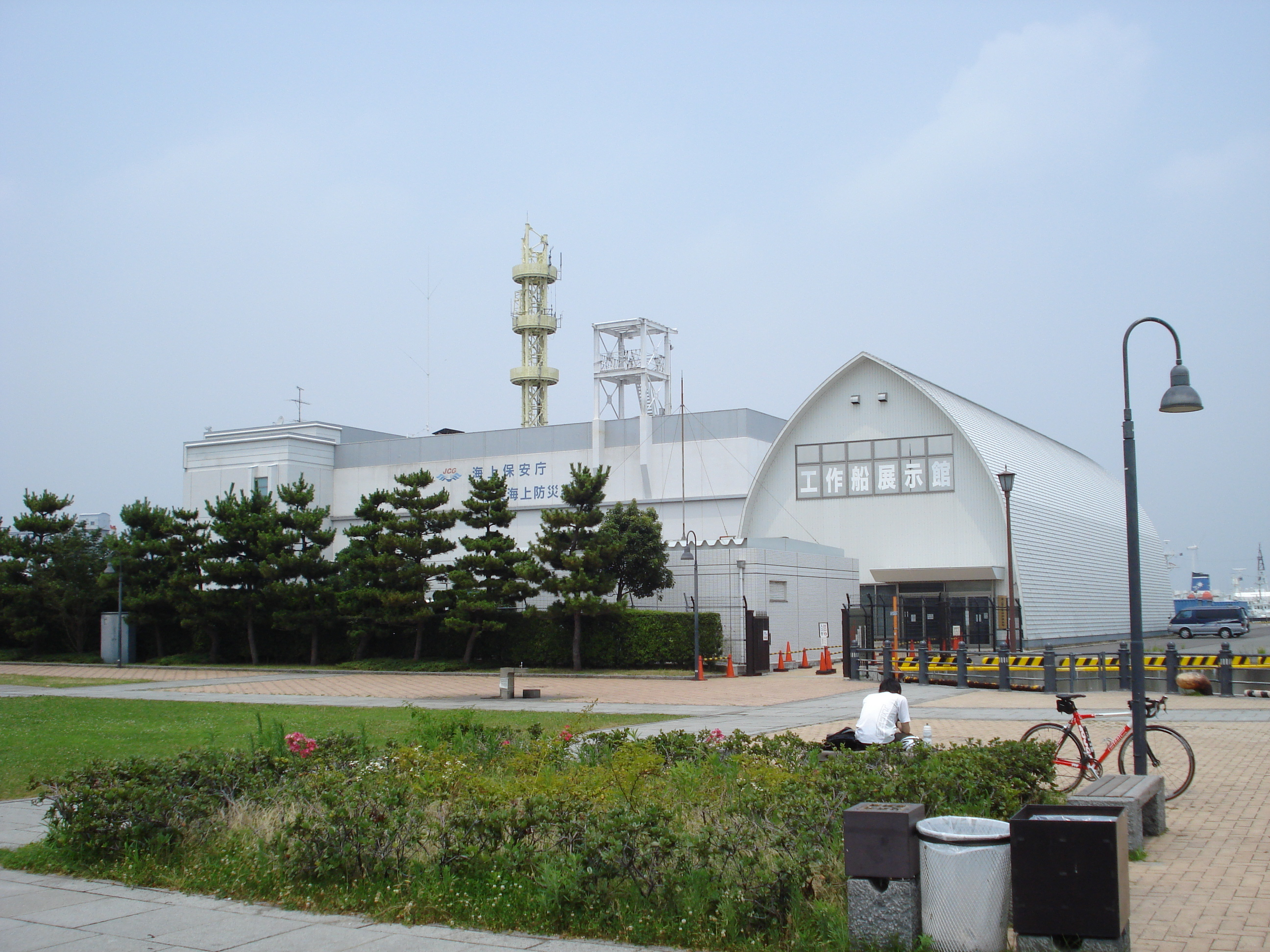
- Japan Coast Guard Museum Yokohama, July 2008
- Established: 10 December 2004
- Location: 1-2-1 Shinkō, Naka-ku, Yokohama, Japan
- Public transit access: Sakuragichō Station
- Website: www.kaiho.mlit.go.jp/03kanku/kouhou/jcgm_yokohama

The Japan Coast Guard Museum Yokohama (海上保安資料館 横浜館, Kaijō hoan shiryōkan Yokohama-kan) is a museum in Naka-ku, Yokohama, Kanagawa Prefecture, Japan, dedicated to maritime security and the Japan Coast Guard. It opened on 10 December 2004.

== Exhibits ==
The centrepiece of the museum is a North Korean spy vessel, Changyu 3705, which was sunk by the Japan Coast Guard in December 2001 following a firefight in the East China Sea near the island of Amami-Ōshima. (See Battle of Amami-Ōshima.)

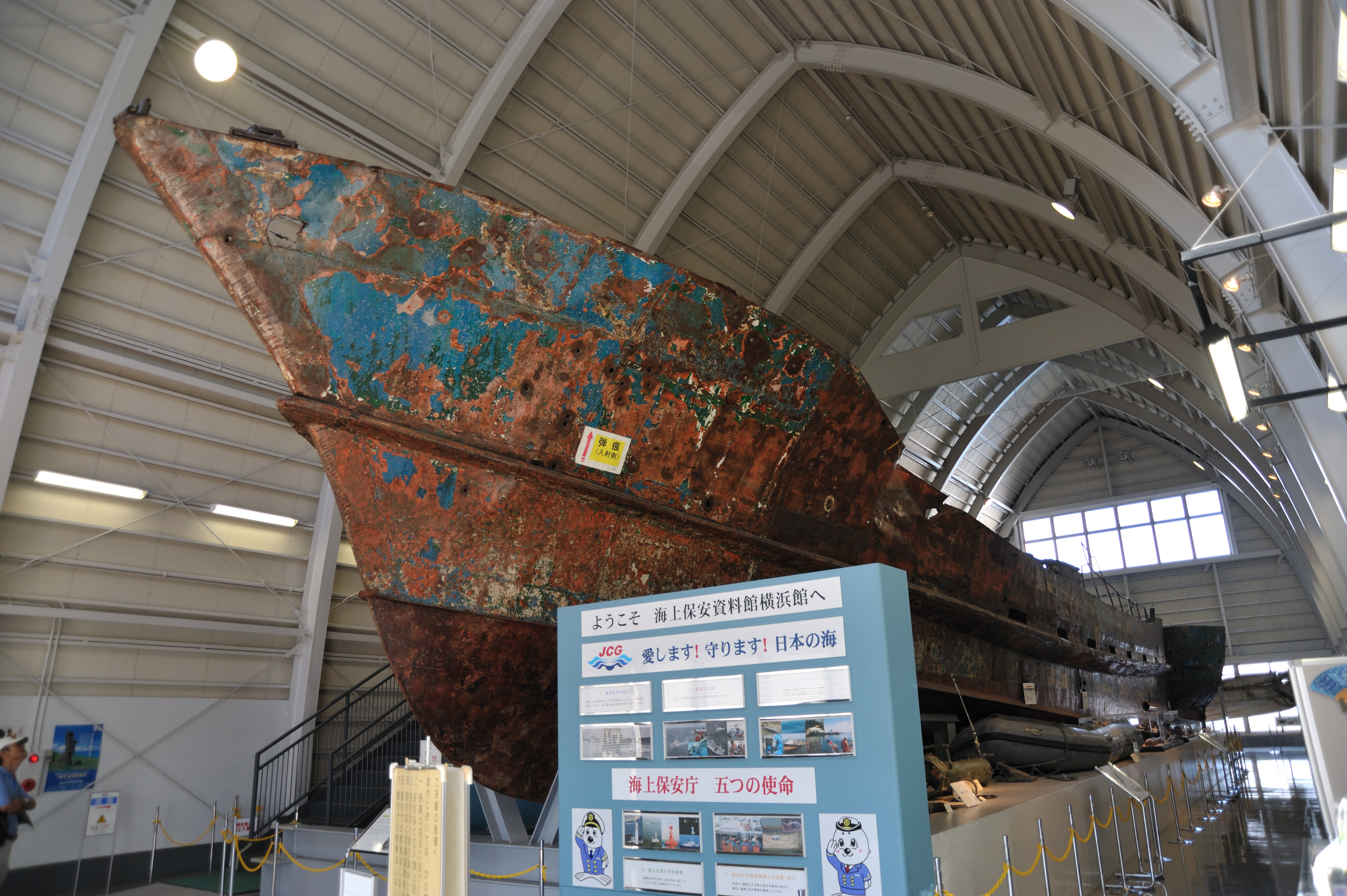
North Korean spy vessel Changyu 3705 housed inside the museum

== See also ==
- NYK Maritime Museum, in Yokohama
- Japan Coast Guard Museum, in Kure, Hiroshima Prefecture
