= Yokohama Archives of History =

Archive in Yokohama, Japan

- Yokohama Kaikō Shiryōkan
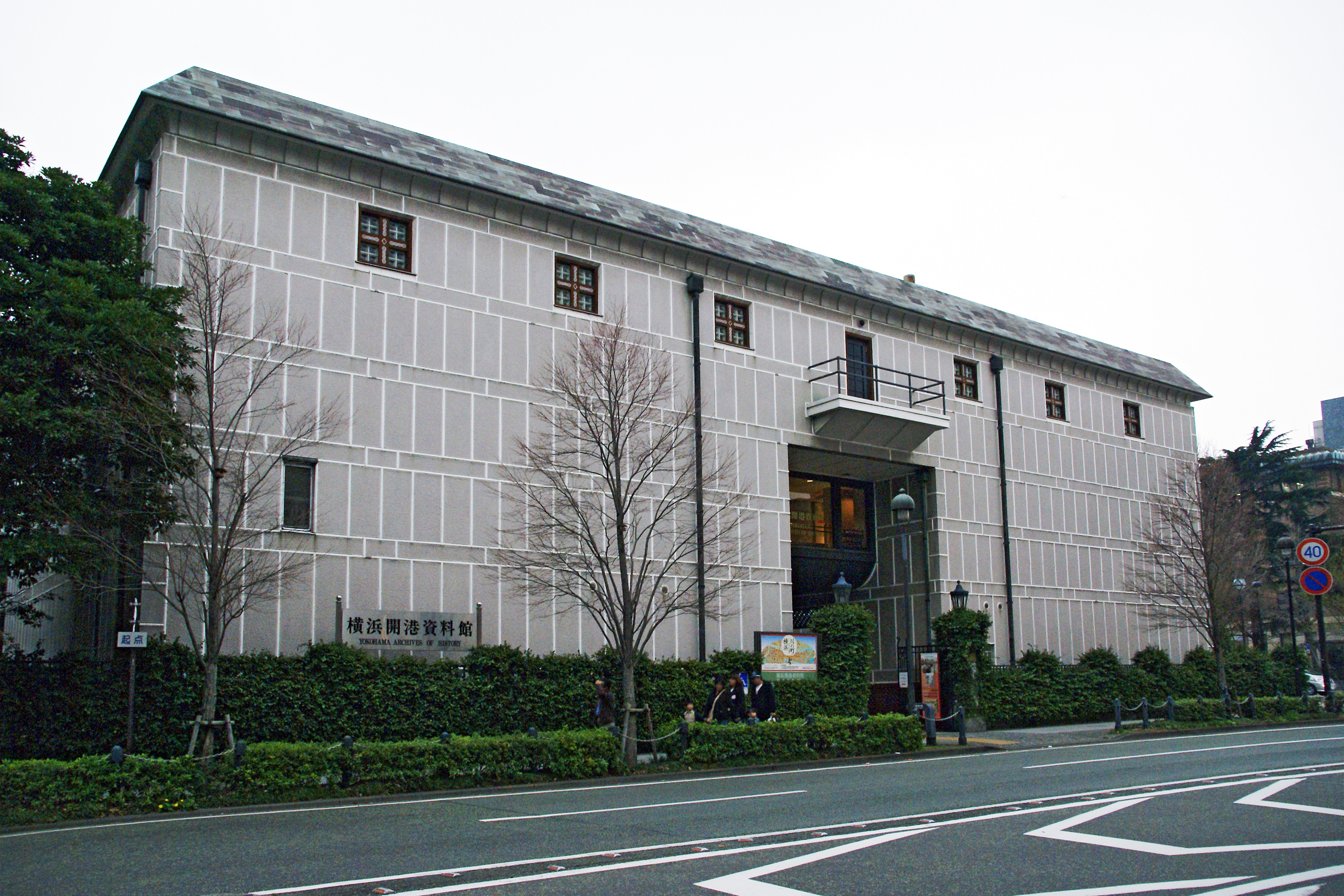

- Location within Kanagawa Prefecture
- Established: 1981; 45 years ago
- Location: 3 Nihon-odori, Naka-ku, Yokohama, Kanagawa, Japan
- Coordinates: 35.4475°N 139.643889°E
- Collection size: approx. 250,000 objects
- Public transit access: Yokohama Underground Minatomirai-Line : Nihon-odori station
- Website: www.kaikou.city.yokohama.jp

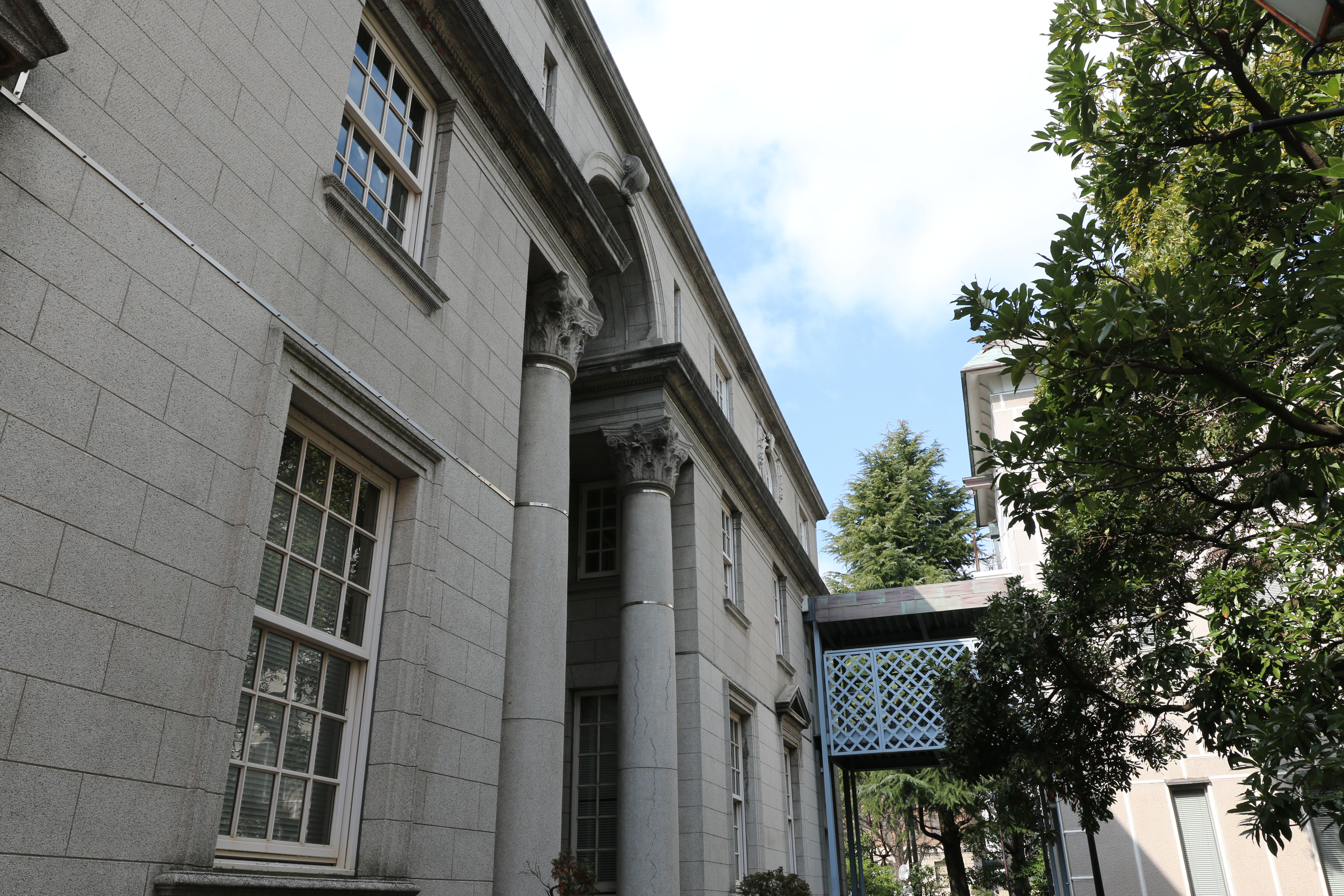
Yokohama Archives of History, old pavilion

The Yokohama Archives of History (横浜開港資料館, Yokohama Kaikō Shiryōkan) in Naka ward, central Yokohama, near Yamashita Park, is a repository for archive materials on Japan and its connection with foreign powers since the arrival of Commodore Matthew Perry in 1853. The archives are next to Kaiko Hiroba (Port Opening Square) where Commodore Perry landed to sign the Convention of Kanagawa.

The archives are housed in a newly built annex of the former British Consulate building. The British Consulate building, which replaced a building destroyed in the 1923 Great Kantō earthquake, was completed in 1931 and used as a consulate until 1972. The ground floor of the building is open to the public and there is a small exhibition room which is free. There are plaques in the building commemorating consulate employees who died in the earthquake, as well as British sailors who died during the British Bombardment of Kagoshima in 1863. The British Court for Japan, under the British Supreme Court for China and Japan, sat in the consulate compound from 1879 to 1900. Prior to that the British Provincial Court for Kanagawa sat in the compound from 1865 to 1878.

The archives include a museum which tells the story of Japan and Yokohama's opening to the West, beginning with the arrival of Commodore Perry and his black ships.

The reading room downstairs has historic Japanese and English newspapers and books. Materials include papers of Ernest Satow, foreign and Japanese newspapers of the Meiji period including, the Japan Daily Herald, the Japan Weekly Mail and Japan Punch. Many of the old newspapers have been copied onto new paper, making them very easy to handle. These copies can be accessed directly from the shelves and can be photocopied. There are also collections of various diplomatic papers relating to Japan's foreign relations. A select number of books on Japanese history, published by the archives, are also available for purchase.

== See also ==
- British Japan Consular Service
- British Court for Japan
- British Supreme Court for China and Japan
- Kobe City Archives
