= Naka-ku, Yokohama =

Naka 中区
- Ward
- Naka Ward
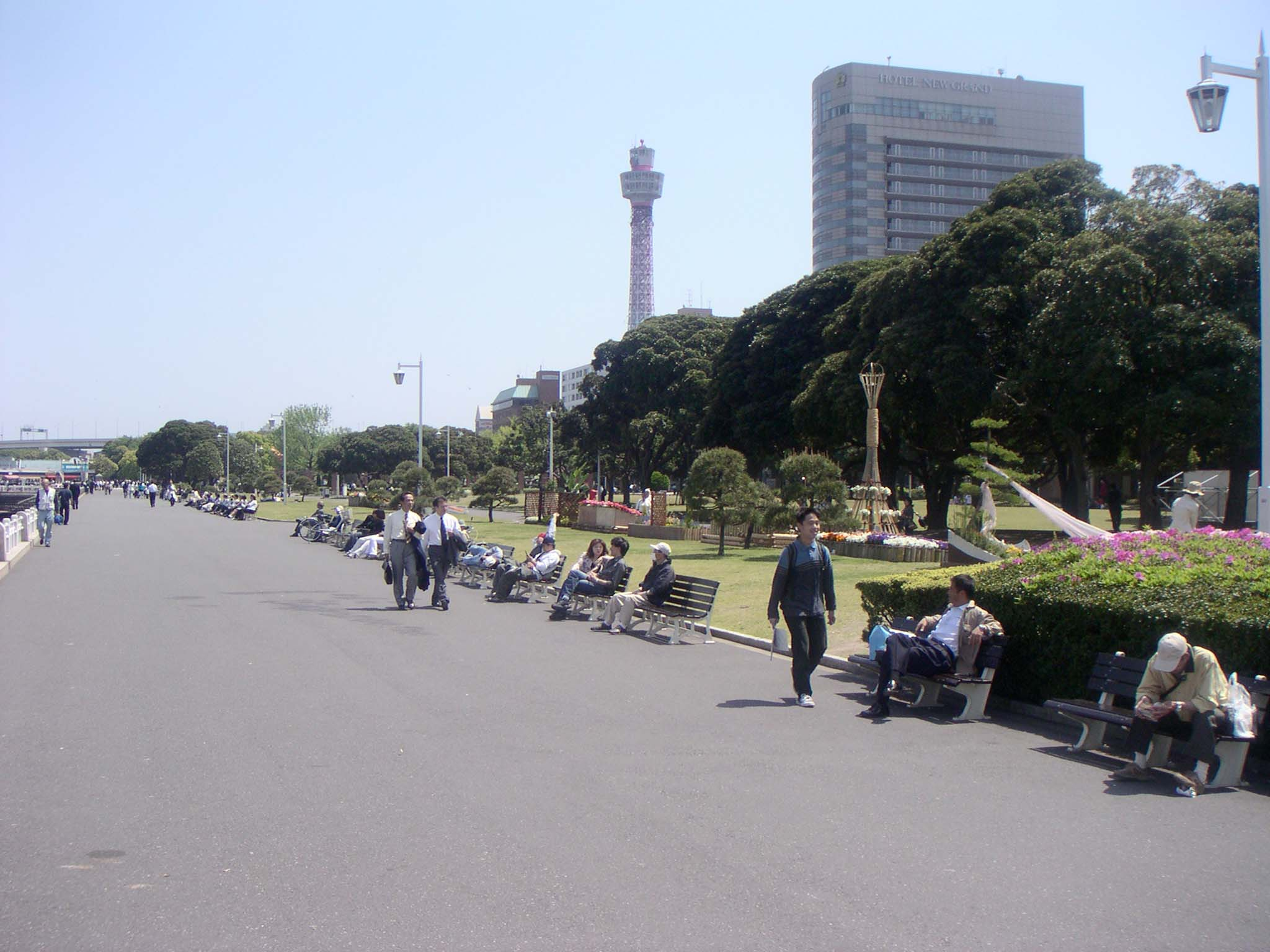
- Yamashita Park and Yokohama Marine Tower

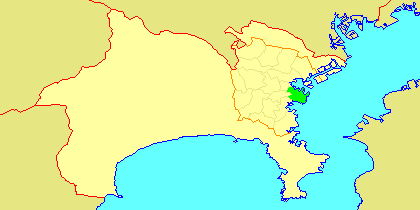
- Location of Naka in Kanagawa

- Naka (Japan)
- Coordinates: 35°26′40″N 139°38′36″E
- Country: Japan
- Region: Kantō
- Prefecture: Kanagawa
- City: Yokohama

Area
  - Total: 20.86 km^{2} (8.05 sq mi)

Population (February 2010)
  - Total: 146,563
  - Density: 7,030/km^{2} (18,200/sq mi)

Ethnic groups: 95% Japanese; 3% Chinese
- Time zone: UTC+9 (Japan Standard Time)
- Flower: Tulip
- Address: 35 Nippon Odori, Naka-ku, Yokohama-shi, Kanagawa-ken; 231-0021
- Website: www.city.yokohama.lg.jp/naka

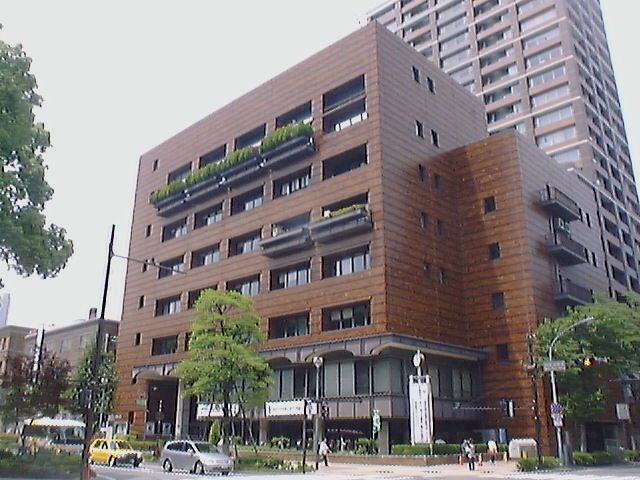
Naka Ward Office

Naka-ku (中区) is one of the 18 wards of the city of Yokohama in Kanagawa Prefecture, Japan. In 2010, the ward had an estimated population of 146,563 and a population density of 7,080 persons per km^{2}. The total area was 20.86 km^{2}.

== Geography ==
Naka Ward is located in eastern Kanagawa Prefecture, and east of the geographic center of the city of Yokohama. Its name means "middle ward." In the low-lying Northern district, commonly referred to as Kannai, it hosts the Yokohama city hall and the headquarters of the Kanagawa prefectural government. The central part of the ward includes elevated ground; this area, known as Yamate, has long been a residential area. Along the shore lies reclaimed land upon which port facilities, part of the Minato Mirai 21 complex, and Yamashita Park were built. To the south are the piers, oil refineries and the central port of Yokohama. The Nakamura River, a branch of the Ōoka River, cuts across the northern part of the ward. The northernmost and southernmost points are upland.

=== Surrounding wards ===
- Nishi Ward
- Minami Ward
- Isogo Ward

== History ==
In the Edo period, the area of present-day Naka-ku was part of the tenryō territory in Musashi Province controlled directly by the Tokugawa shogunate, but administered through various hatamoto. Before 1667 much of the area in Naka-ku and Minami-ku was submerged and a part of a lagoon. In that year, a large scale reclamation project, the Yoshida Shinden was completed. During this period Naka-ku developed into a largely agricultural area compromised reclaimed paddy fields for rice production. In the Bakumatsu Period, the signing of the Kanagawa Treaty provided for the opening of treaty ports, and the area of what is now central Naka Ward was designated as open to foreign settlement in 1859. The Yokohama Cricket Club (now known as the Yokohama Country & Athletic Club) was established in 1868. Yokohama Chinatown was also established during this period.

After the Meiji Restoration, the area was transferred to the new Kuraki District in Kanagawa Prefecture. Yokohama's wards were established on October 10, 1927, with this area becoming Naka Ward. The 1923 Great Kantō earthquake devastated downtown Yokohama. Yamashita Park was established in 1930 with landfill from the earthquake rubble. In December 1943, Minami Ward was separated from Naka Ward, which also gave up some territory to Kanagawa Ward and Hodogaya Ward. Nishi Ward was separated from Naka Ward in 1944.

== Economy ==
Naka Ward is a regional commercial center and the old main business district of Yokohama.

Yokohama's day labourers concentrate in the Kotobuki-cho ward near the Ishikawachō Station. Historically, most used to work at the harbour, with 5500 labourers in 1982.

== Transportation ==
=== Rail ===
- East Japan Railway Company – Keihin-Tohoku Line, Negishi Line, Yokohama Line
  - Sakuragichō - Kannai - Ishikawachō - Yamate
- Keihin Electric Express Railway - Keikyū Main Line
  - Hinodechō
- Yokohama Minatomirai Railway Company – Minatomirai Line
  - Bashamichi - Nihon-ōdōri - Motomachi-Chūkagai
- Yokohama City Transportation Bureau – Blue Line
  - Sakuragichō –Kannai –Isezaki-Chōjamachi
- Japan Freight Railway Company-Tōkaidō Freight Line

=== Highways ===
- Shuto Expressway
- National Route 16
- National Route 133
- National Route 357

=== Ferry ===
- The Port Service

== Education ==
Colleges and universities:

- Ferris University
- Kanto Gakuin University

The Kanagawa Prefectural Board of Education operates prefectural high schools:

- Yokohama-Midorigaoka Senior High School
- Yokohama-Tateno Senior High School

The Yokohama Municipal Board of Education operates municipal high schools:

- Minato Sogo High School
- Yokohama Sogo High School

The municipal board of education operates public elementary and junior high schools.

Junior high schools:

- Honmoku (本牧)
- Minato (港)
- Nakaodai (仲尾台)
- Otori (大鳥)
- Yokohama Yoshida (横浜吉田)

Elementary schools:

- Honcho (本町)
- Honmoku (本牧)
- Honmoku Minami (本牧南)
- Kitagata (北方)
- Makado (間門)
- Motomachi (元街)
- Otori (大鳥)
- Tateno (立野)
- Yamamoto (山元)

Additionally, the zones of Azuma Elementary School (東小学校), Ishikawa Elementary School (石川小学校), Minami Yoshida Elementary School (南吉田小学校), Minatomiraihoncho Elementary School (みなとみらい本町小学校), and Negishi Elementary School (根岸小学校), all with campuses outside of Naka-ku, include portions of Naka-ku.

Private primary and secondary schools:

- Yokohama International School
- Yokohama Overseas Chinese School
- Yokohama Yamate Chinese School
- Yokohama Jogakuin Junior and Senior High School
- Saint Maur International School

== Local attractions ==
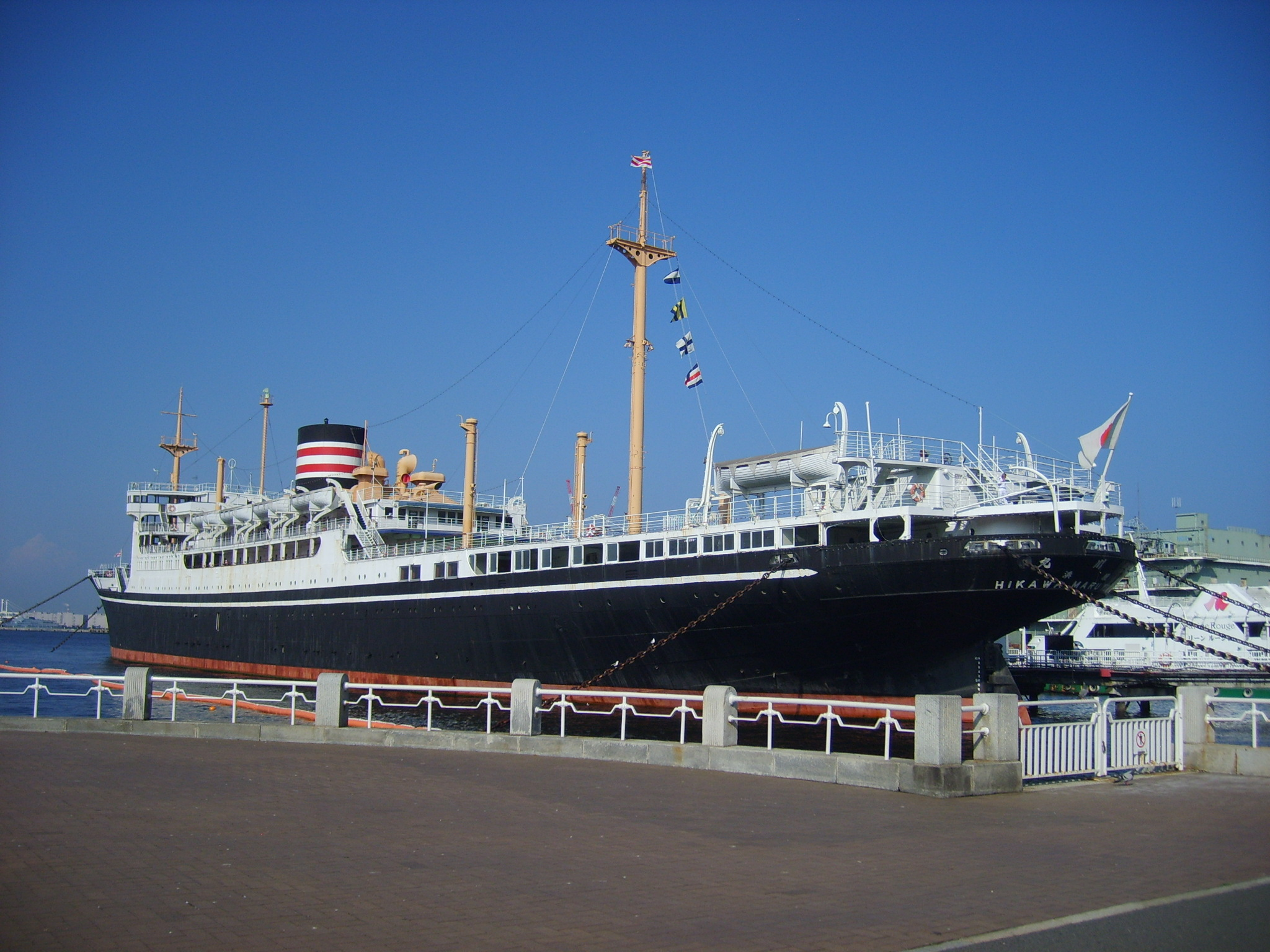
Hikawa Maru at Yamashita Park

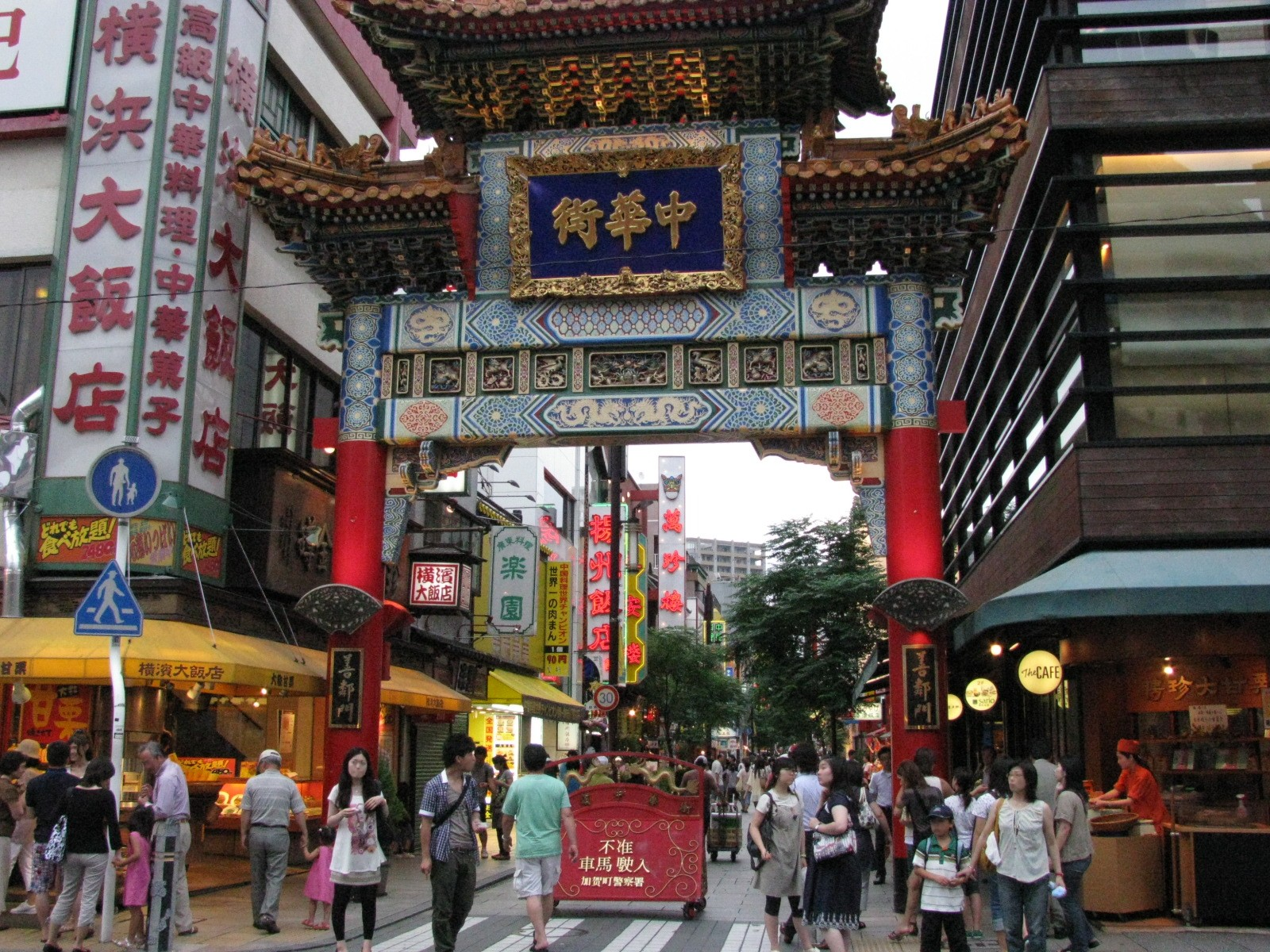
Yokohama Chinatown

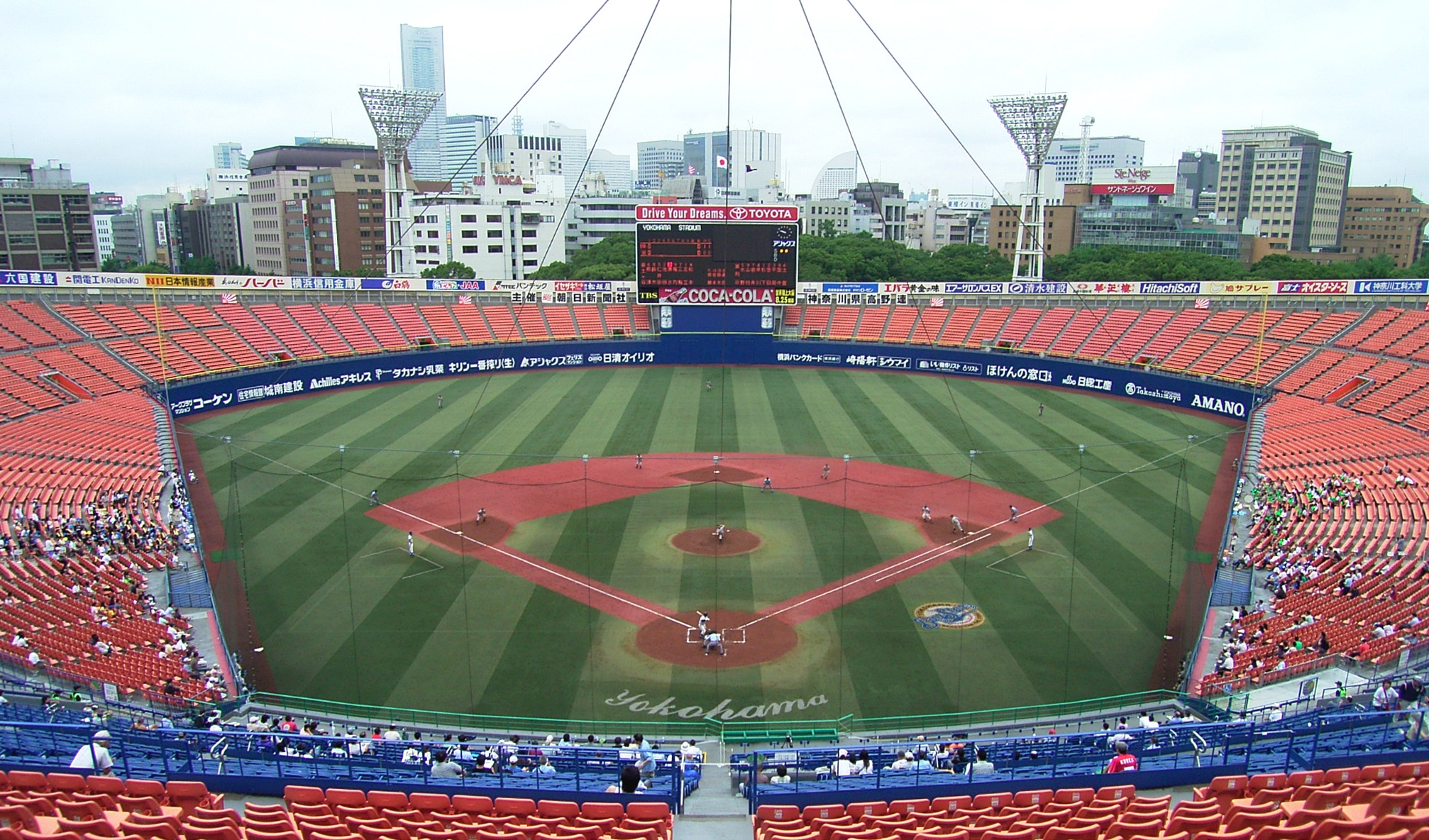
Yokohama Baseball Stadium

- Hikawa Maru
- Isezakichō
- Japan Coast Guard Museum Yokohama
- Kannai
- Motomachi
- NYK Maritime Museum
- Ōsanbashi Pier
- Sankeien
- Yamashita Park
- Yamate
- Yokohama Archives of History
- Yokohama Bay Bridge
- Yokohama Chinatown
- Yokohama Curry Museum (closed 2007)
- Yokohama Foreign General Cemetery
- Yokohama Marine Tower
- Yokohama Red Brick Warehouse
- Yokohama Stadium

== Events ==
- Yokohama Honmoku Jazz Festival, annually in late summer

== Notable people ==
- Anna Ogino, author
