= Minatomirai Station =

Railway station in Yokohama, Kanagawa prefecture, Japan

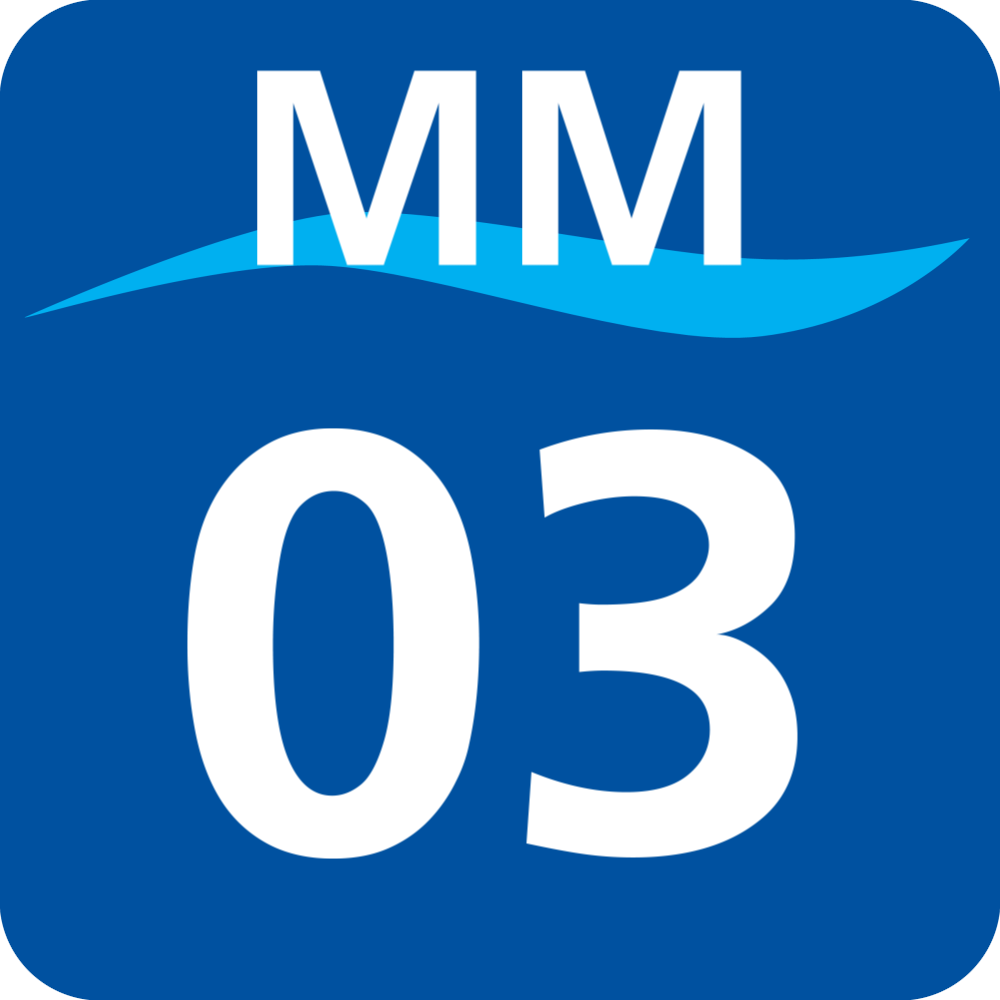
Minatomirai Station みなとみらい駅

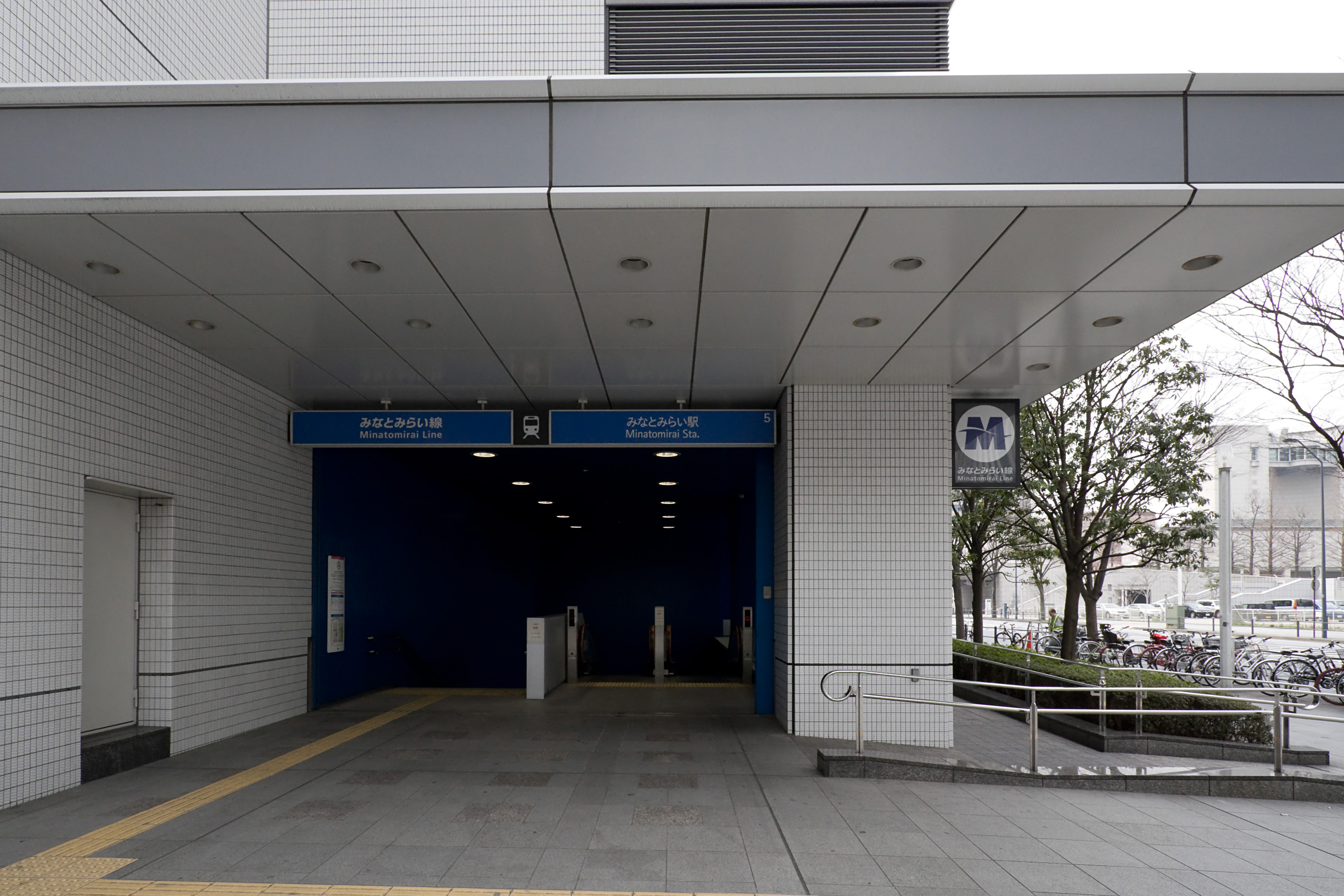
- Entrance No.5 in March 2010

General information
- Location: 3-5 Minatomirai, Nishi-ku, Yokohama-shi, Kanagawa-ken; Japan
- Coordinates: 35.4573°N 139.6329°E
- Operator: Yokohama Minatomirai Railway Company
- Line: Minatomirai Line
- Distance: 1.7 km from Yokohama
- Platforms: 1 island platform
- Tracks: 2

Construction
- Structure type: Underground
- Accessible: Yes

Other information
- Station code: MM03
- Website: Official website

History
- Opened: 1 February 2004

Passengers
- FY2011: 60,056 daily

Services
Preceding station	Yokohama Minatomirai	Following station
Motomachi-Chūkagai Terminus	S-Train (Weekends and national holidays)	Yokohama towards Seibu-Chichibu
Motomachi-Chūkagai Terminus	F Liner	Yokohama towards Hannō or Ogawamachi
Motomachi-Chūkagai Terminus	Minatomirai Line Limited Express	Yokohama Terminus
Bashamichi towards Motomachi-Chūkagai	Minatomirai Line Commuter Express Express	Yokohama Terminus
Bashamichi towards Motomachi-Chūkagai	Minatomirai Line Local	Shin-takashima towards Yokohama
Location
- Location within Kanagawa Prefecture

Minatomirai Station (みなとみらい駅, Minatomirai-eki) is an underground railway station on the Minatomirai Line in Nishi-ku, Yokohama, Kanagawa Prefecture, Japan, operated by the third-sector railway operating company Yokohama Minatomirai Railway.

== Lines ==
Minatomirai Station is served by the 4.1 km underground Minatomirai Line from Yokohama to Motomachi-Chūkagai, and is located 1.7 km from the starting point of the line at Yokohama Station. Trains through-run to and from the Tokyu Toyoko Line from Shibuya Station and beyond on the Tokyo Metro Fukutoshin Line and Tobu Tojo Line and Seibu Ikebukuro Line.

== Station layout ==
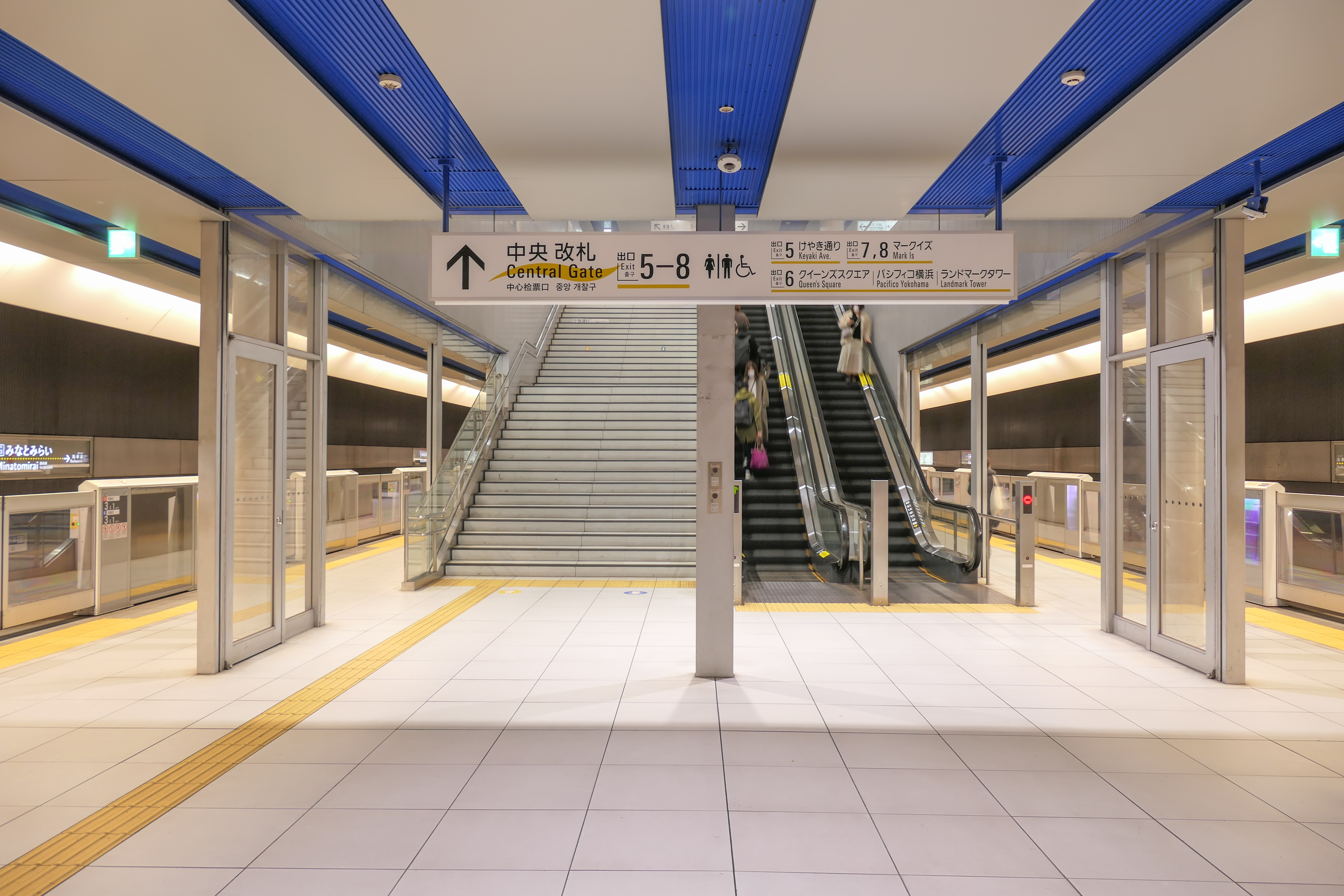
Station platform, 18 December 2021

Minatomirai Station is an underground station with a single island platform serving two tracks. The station is located directly below the Queen's Square shopping complex.

=== Platforms ===
1	Minatomirai Line	for Bashamichi and Motomachi-Chūkagai
2	Minatomirai Line	for Shin-takashima and Yokohama; Tokyu Toyoko Line for Shibuya; Tokyo Metro Fukutoshin Line for Shinjuku-sanchōme, Ikebukuro, and Wakōshi; Tobu Tojo Line for Kawagoeshi and Shinrinkoen; Seibu Ikebukuro Line for Hannō

Chest-high platform-edge doors were installed on both sides of the platform by April 2018.

== History ==
Minatomirai Station opened on 1 February 2004, coinciding with the opening of the Minatomirai Line.

== Passenger statistics ==
In fiscal 2011, the station was used by an average of 60,056 passengers daily.

== Surrounding area ==
- Minato Mirai 21
  - Yokohama Landmark Tower
  - Pacifico Yokohama
  - Yokohama Museum of Art

== See also ==
- List of railway stations in Japan
