= Motomachi-Chūkagai Station =

Railway station in Yokohama, Kanagawa prefecture, Japan

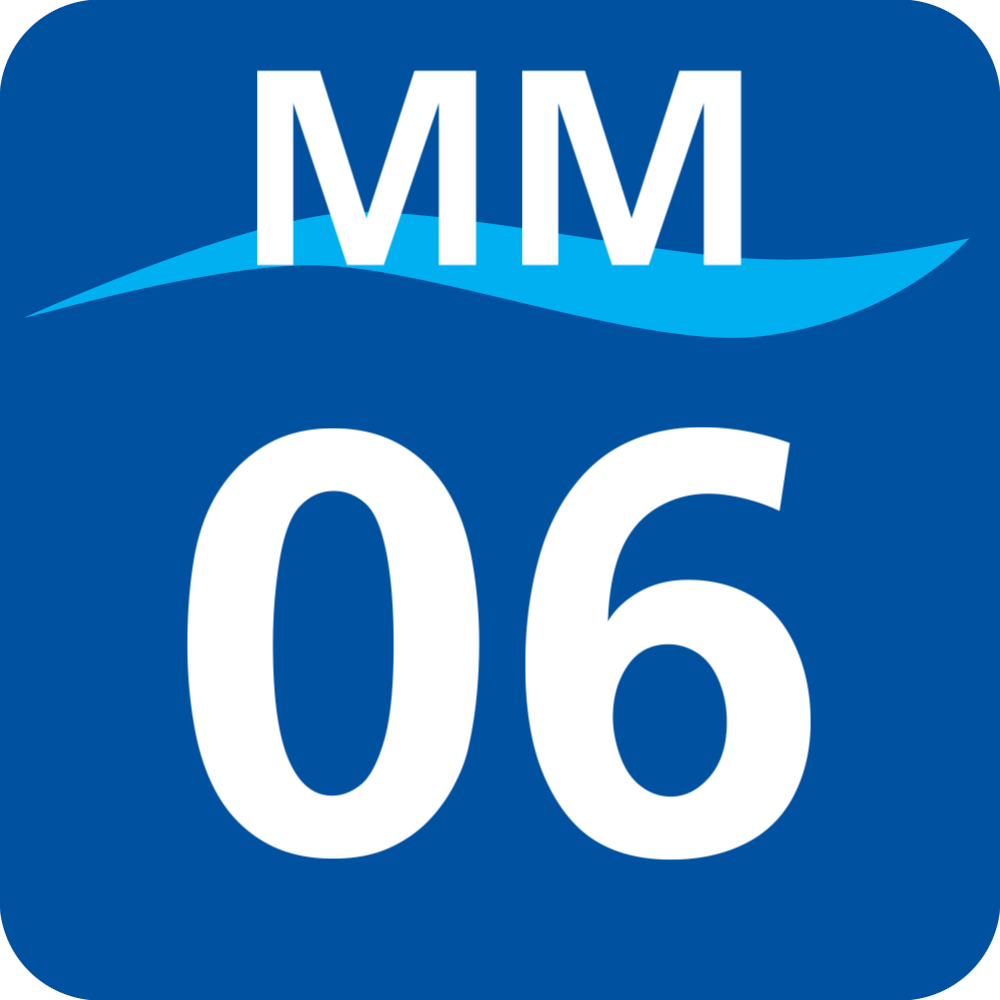
Motomachi-Chukagai Station Yamashita-kōen 元町・中華街駅

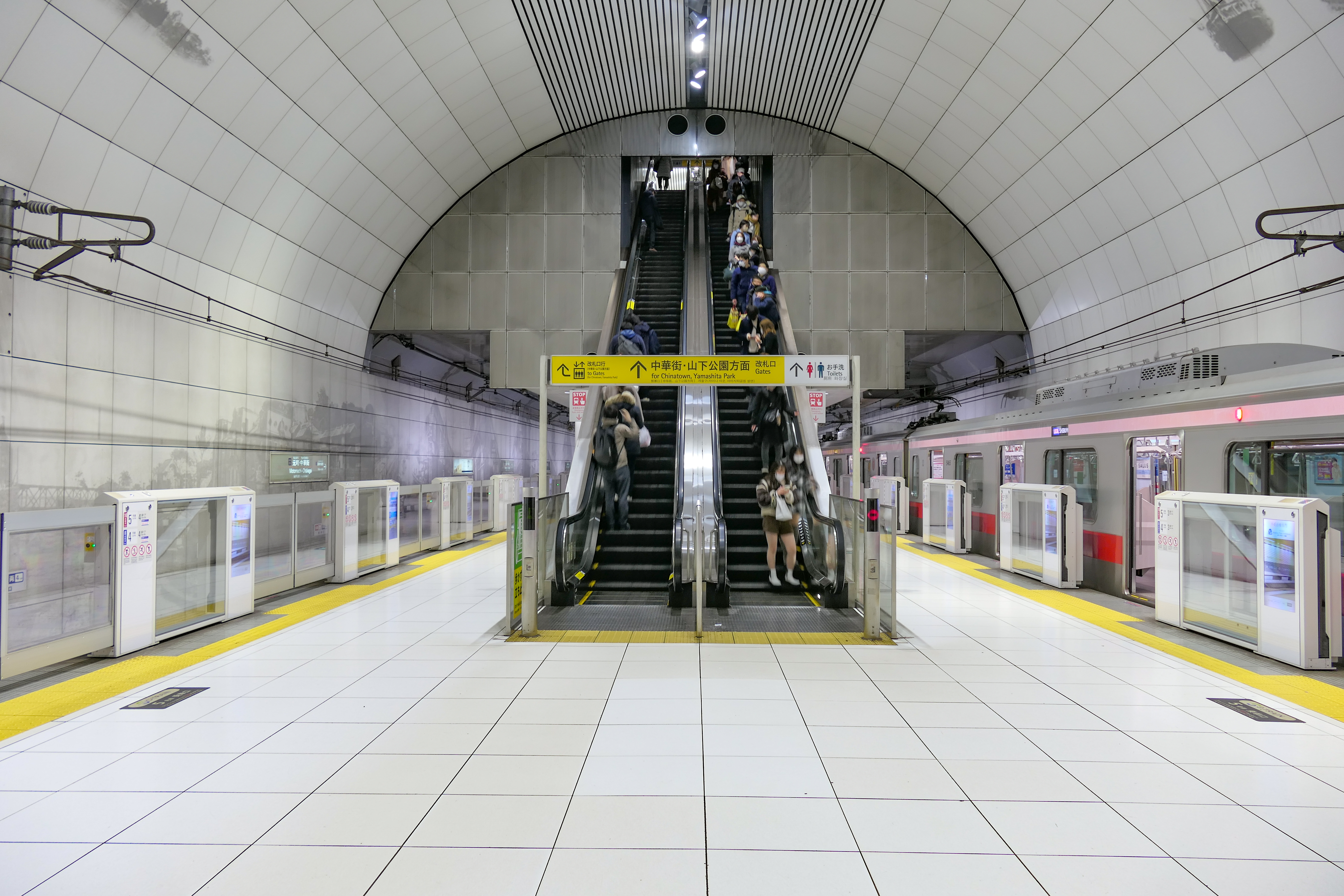
- The station platform in December 2021

General information
- Location: 65 Yamashita-cho, Naka-ku, Yokohama-shi, Kanagawa-ken; Japan
- Coordinates: 35°26′32.01″N 139°39′2.8″E
- Operator: Yokohama Minatomirai Railway Company
- Line: Minatomirai Line
- Distance: 4.1 km from Yokohama
- Platforms: 1 island platform
- Tracks: 2

Construction
- Structure type: Underground

Other information
- Station code: MM06
- Website: Official website

History
- Opened: 1 February 2004; 22 years ago

Passengers
- FY2011: 54,172 daily

Services
Preceding station	Yokohama Minatomirai	Following station
Terminus	S-Train (Weekends and national holidays)	Minatomirai towards Seibu-Chichibu
Terminus	F Liner	Minatomirai towards Hannō or Ogawamachi
Terminus	Minatomirai Line Limited Express	Minatomirai towards Yokohama
Terminus	Minatomirai Line Commuter Express Express Local	Nihon-ōdōri towards Yokohama
Location
- Location within Kanagawa Prefecture Location within Japan

Motomachi-Chukagai Station (元町・中華街駅, Motomachi-Chūkagai-eki) is an underground railway station on the Minatomirai Line subway in Naka-ku, Yokohama, Kanagawa Prefecture, Japan, operated by the third-sector railway operating company Yokohama Minatomirai Railway Company. It is numbered "MM06", and its official name, as shown on signage in the station, is "Motomachi-Chūkagai Station (Yamashita-kōen)" (元町・中華街駅（山下公園）, Motomachi-Chūkagai-eki Yamashitakōen) with the sub-name (Yamashita-kōen, referring to Yamashita Park) in parentheses, although the use of this full name is limited.

== Lines ==
Motomachi-Chukagai Station is served by the underground Minatomirai Line, and is 4.1 km (2.5 mi) from the starting point of the line at Yokohama Station. Trains through-run to and from the Tokyu Toyoko Line from Shibuya Station and beyond on the Tokyo Metro Fukutoshin Line and Tobu Tojo Line and Seibu Ikebukuro Line.

== Station layout ==
Motomachi-Chukagai Station is an underground station with a single island platform serving two terminating tracks on the fourth basement ("B4F") level.

=== Platforms ===
1-2	Minatomirai Line	for Yokohama; Tokyu Toyoko Line for Shibuya; Tokyo Metro Fukutoshin Line for Shinjuku-sanchōme, Ikebukuro, and Wakōshi; Tobu Tojo Line for Kawagoeshi and Shinrinkoen; Seibu Ikebukuro Line for Hannō and Agano; Seibu Chichibu Line for Seibu-Chichibu

== History ==
Motomachi-Chukagai Station opened on 1 February 2004, coinciding with the opening of the Minatomirai Line.

== Passenger statistics ==
In fiscal 2011, the station was used by an average of 54,172 passengers daily.

== Surrounding area ==
JR East's Ishikawachō Station, served by the Negishi Line, was renamed "Ishikawachō 'Motomachi-Chūkagai' Station" on 15 September 2016 to alleviate confusion on which Negishi Line station is closest to Motomachi and Yokohama Chinatown. Despite this, the two stations are located relatively far from each other, making transfer impractical.

- Yokohama Chinatown, one of the largest Chinatowns in the world with over 500 shops and restaurants. Exit from the Chūkagai Exit of the station.
- Motomachi Shopping Street, a fashionable shopping street, with stores carrying original style clothing and shoes, foreign imports, and European goods. Exit from the Motomachi Exit of the station.
- Yamate and Bluff areas, a historic neighborhood with many old foreign residences. Exit from the Motomachi Exit of the station, and walk east up the hill.
- Yokohama Marine Tower, the tallest lighthouse in the world. Exit from the Marine Tower Exit of the station, and walk north.
- Yamashita Park, a park facing Yokohama Harbor. Exit from the Yamashita Park Exit of the station, and walk north towards the ocean.
- Hotel New Grand, one of the oldest hotels in Yokohama. Exit from the Yamashita Park Exit of the station, and walk north.

== See also ==
- List of railway stations in Japan
