= Kawagoeshi Station =

Railway station in Kawagoe, Saitama Prefecture, Japan

TJ22 Kawagoeshi Station 川越市駅
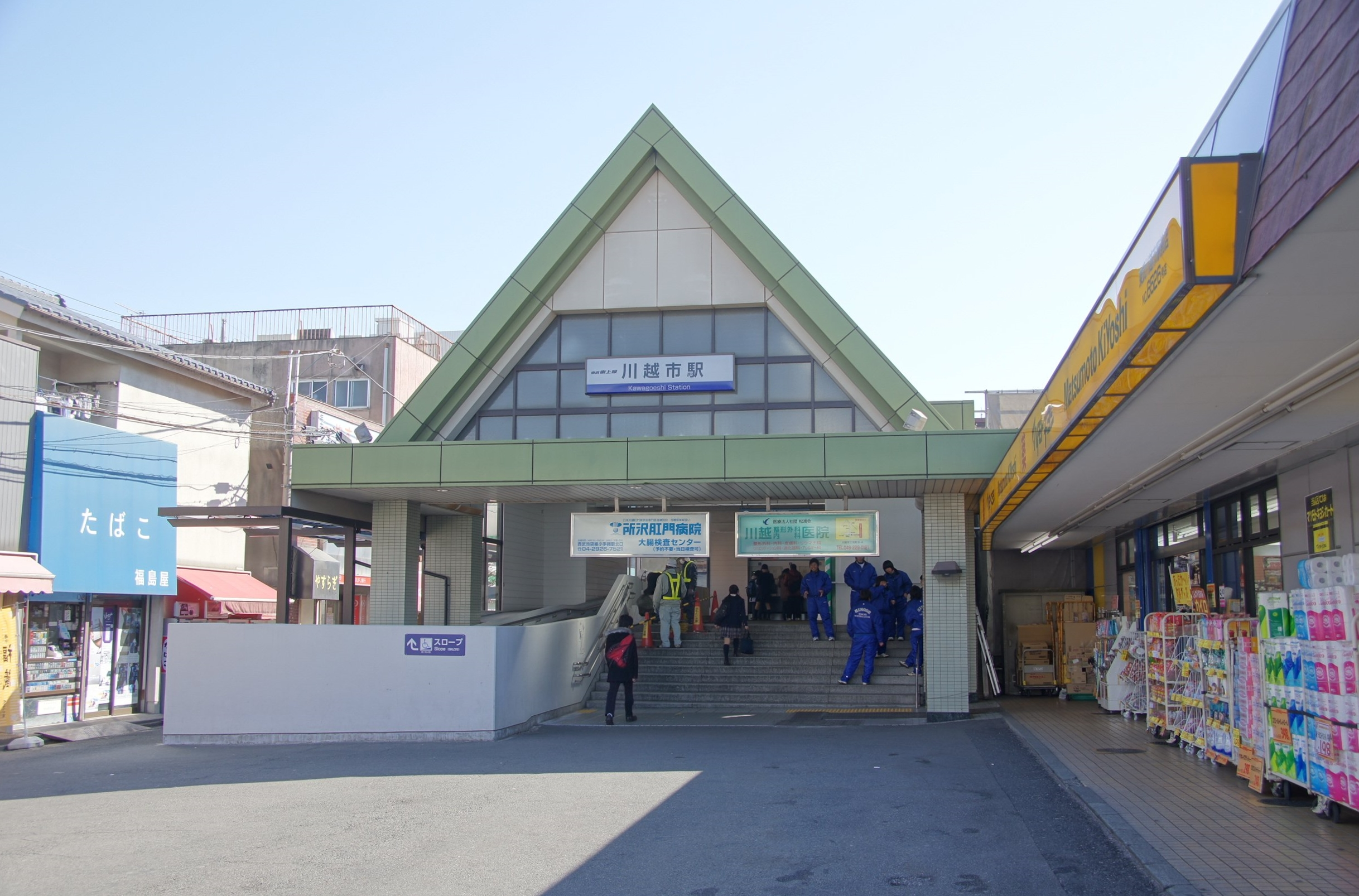
- The station entrance in February 2012

General information
- Location: 1-4-4 Rokken-machi, Kawagoe-shi, Saitama-ken 350-0041; Japan
- Coordinates: 35.913945°N 139.477235°E
- Operator: Tōbu Railway
- Line: Tōbu Tōjō Line
- Distance: 31.4 km from Ikebukuro
- Platforms: 2 island platforms
- Tracks: 4
- Connections: Hon-Kawagoe Station (Seibu Shinjuku Line)

Construction
- Structure type: At-grade
- Accessible: Yes

Other information
- Station code: TJ-22
- Website: Official website

History
- Opened: 1 May 1914
- Former names: Kawagoe-machi (until 1922)

Passengers
- FY2019: 37,600 daily

Services
Preceding station	Tobu Railway	Following station
Sakado TJ26 towards Ogawamachi	TJ Liner	Kawagoe One-way operation
Sakado TJ26 towards Ogawamachi	Kawagoe	Kawagoe TJ21 towards Ikebukuro
Kasumigaseki TJ23 towards Ogawamachi	F Liner	Kawagoe TJ21 towards Motomachi-Chūkagai
Kasumigaseki TJ23 towards Yorii	Tojo Line Rapid Express Express Semi Express Local	Kawagoe TJ21 towards Ikebukuro
Location
- Location within Saitama Prefecture Location within Japan

Kawagoeshi Station (川越市駅, Kawagoeshi-eki) is a passenger railway station located in the city of Kawagoe, Saitama, Japan, operated by the private railway operator Tōbu Railway.

== Lines ==
Kawagoeshi Station is served by the Tōbu Tōjō Line from Ikebukuro in Tokyo, with some services inter-running via the Tokyo Metro Yurakucho Line to Shin-Kiba and the Tokyo Metro Fukutoshin Line to Shibuya and onward via the Tokyu Toyoko Line and Minato Mirai Line to Motomachi-Chukagai. Located between Kawagoe and Kasumigaseki, it is 31.4 km from the Ikebukuro terminus. All services, (TJ Liner, Rapid express, Express, Semi express, Local) stop at this station except for the two morning up TJ Liner services for Ikebukuro.

== Station layout ==
The station has two island platforms serving four tracks. The station building and entrance is located on the east side. A new footbridge providing lift access was added during fiscal 2010.

Two storage tracks are located between the running lines north of the station for use by trains terminating at this station. On the west side of the station lies the Kawagoe maintenance depot, which is responsible for minor overhauls of Tojo Line rolling stock.

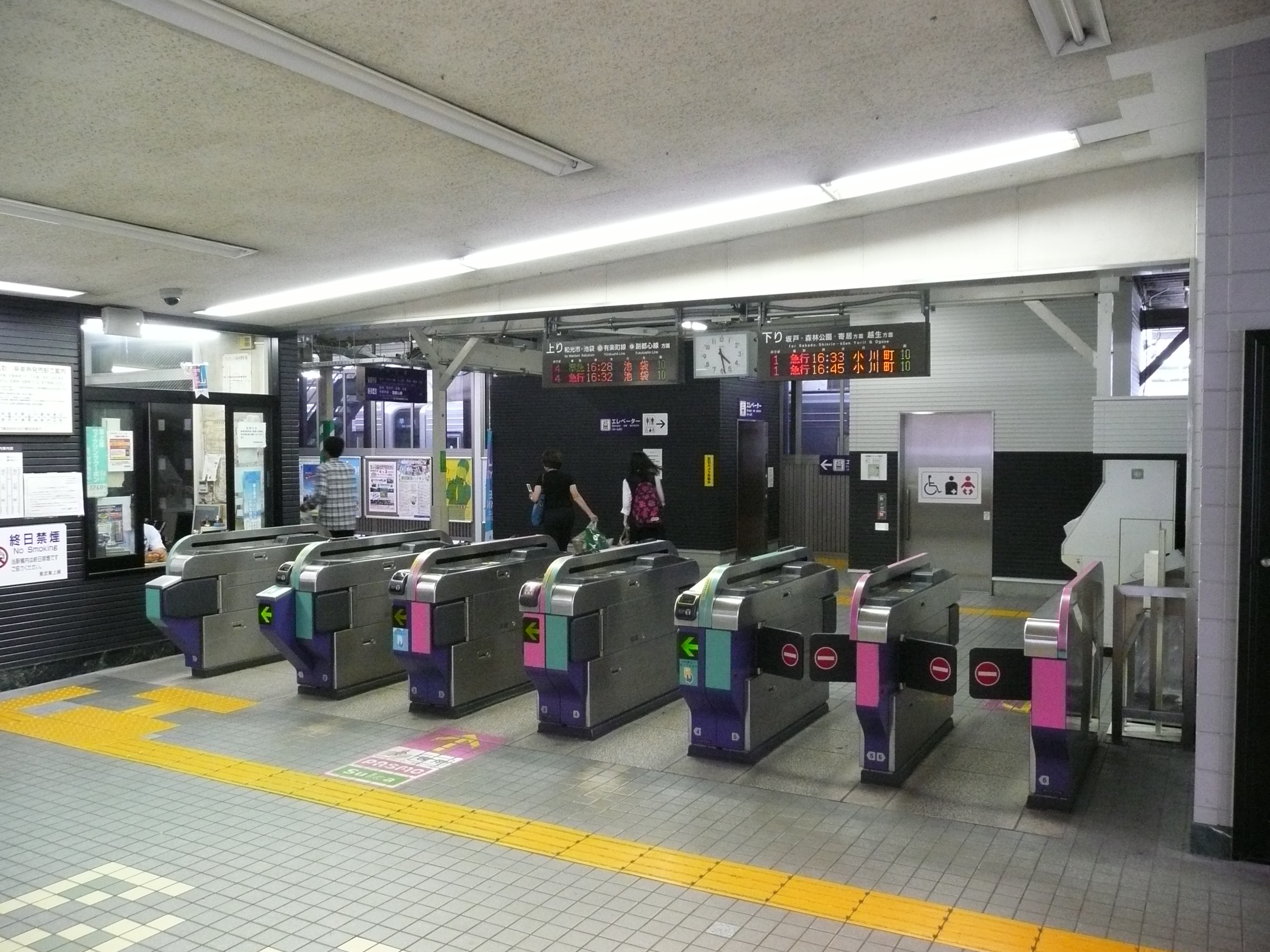
The ticket barriers in May 2012

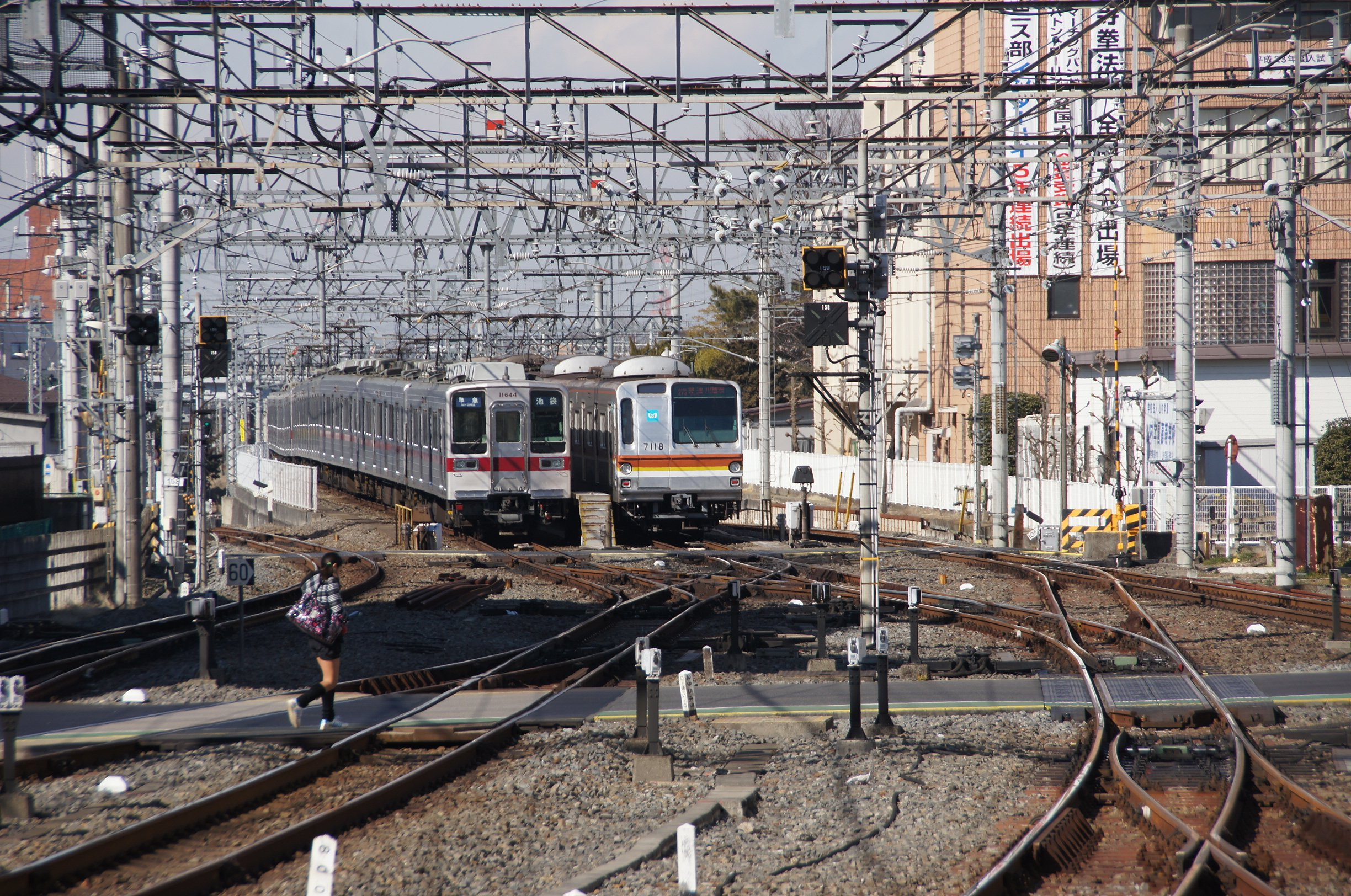
Trains waiting to form up services in the two stabling sidings to the north of the station in February 2012

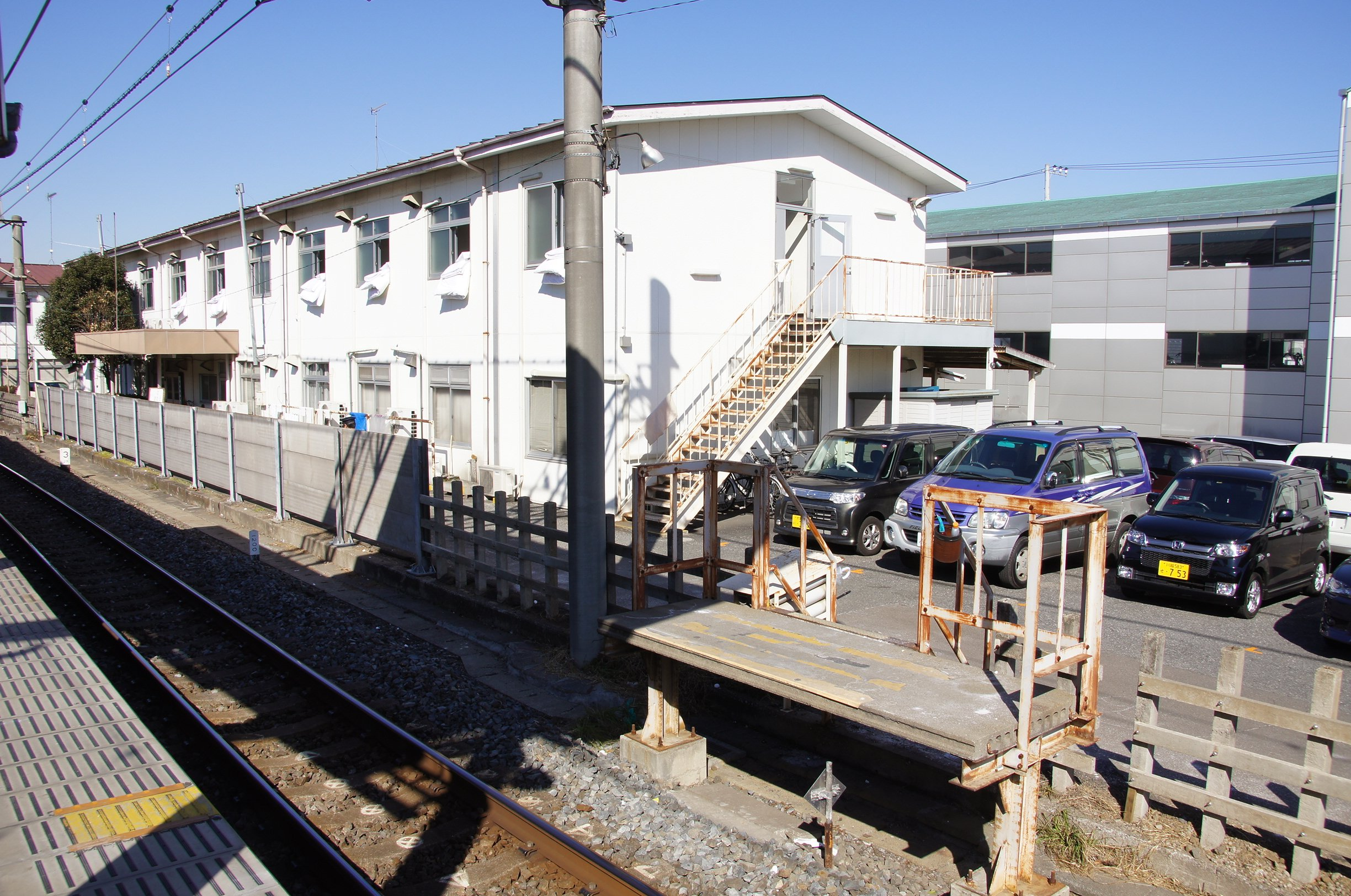
The driver changeover platform for up services and the staff dormitory block next to the station in February 2012

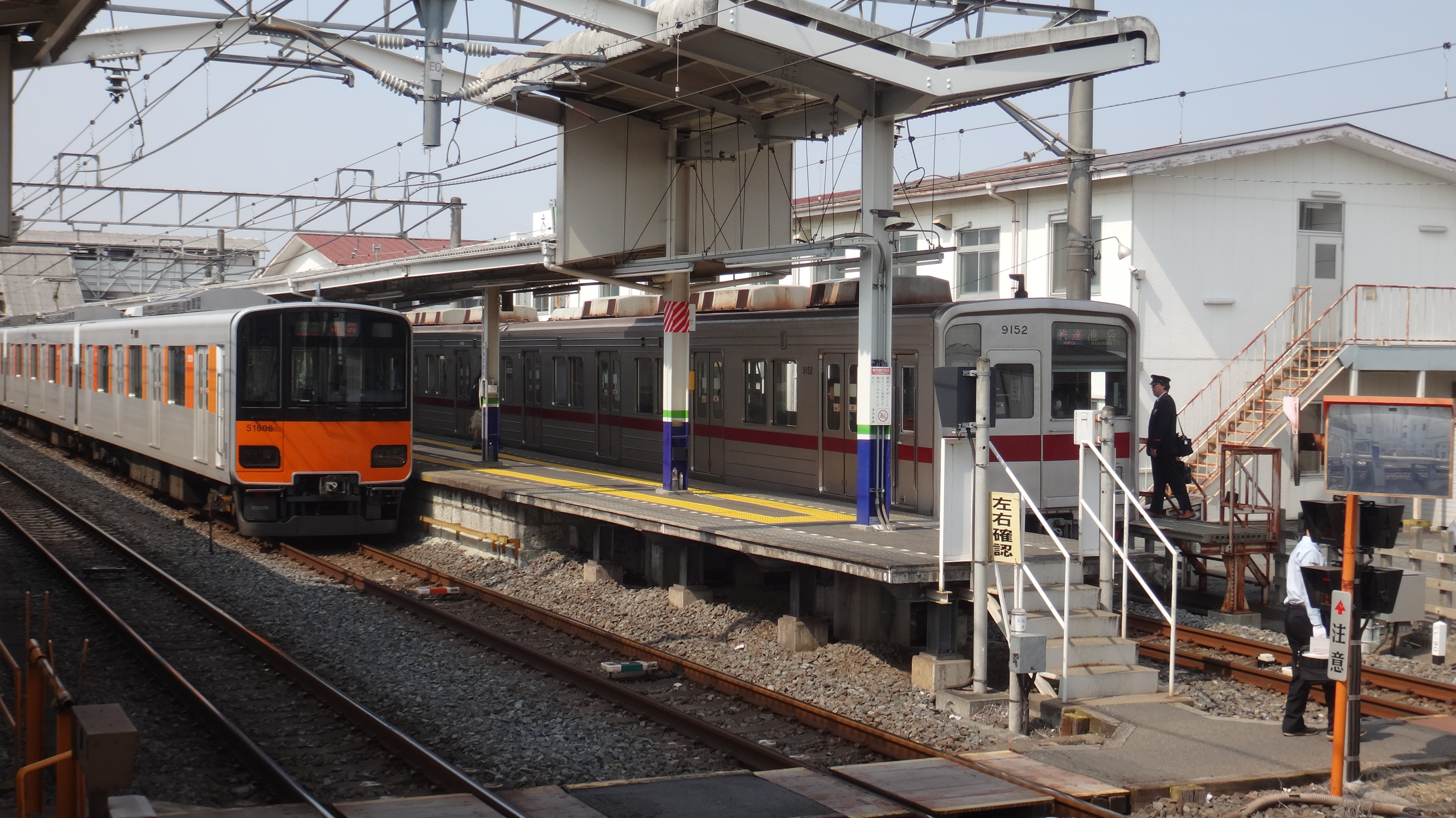
Drivers changing over on an up service in March 2017

=== Platforms ===
1/2	Tōbu Tōjō Line	for Sakado, Shinrinkōen, and Ogawamachi
3/4	Tōbu Tōjō Line	for Kawagoe, Wakōshi, and Ikebukuro; Tokyo Metro Yurakucho Line for Shin-Kiba; Tokyo Metro Fukutoshin Line for Shibuya; Tōkyū Tōyoko Line for Hiyoshi and Yokohama; Tōkyū Shin-Yokohama Line for Shin-Yokohama via Sōtetsu Shin-Yokohama Line for Shōnandai; Minatomirai Line for Motomachi-Chukagai

Platform 2 is generally used for trains terminating at this station, and platform 3 is generally used for trains starting from this station.

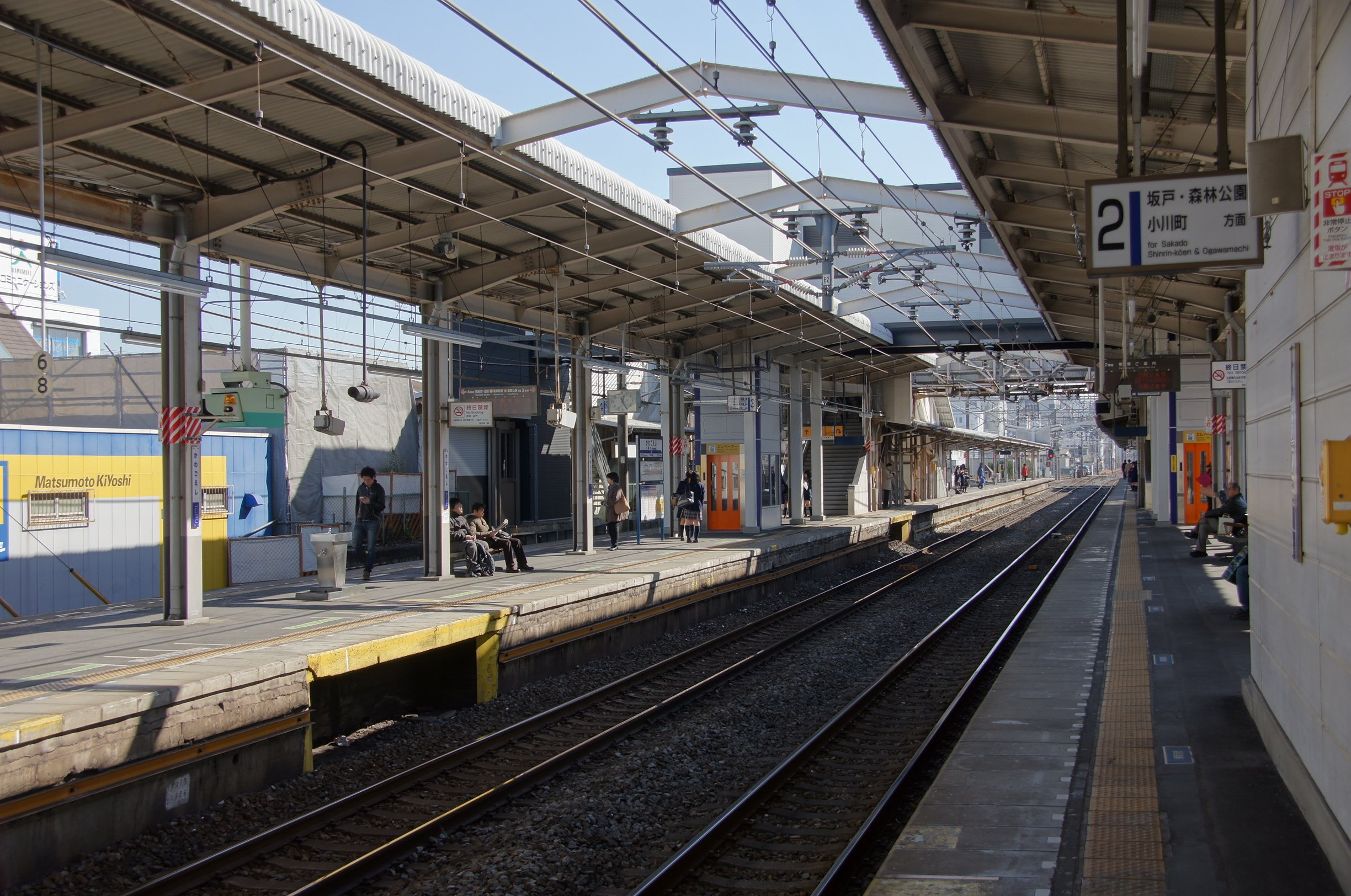
View from the down end of platforms 1 & 2 in February 2012

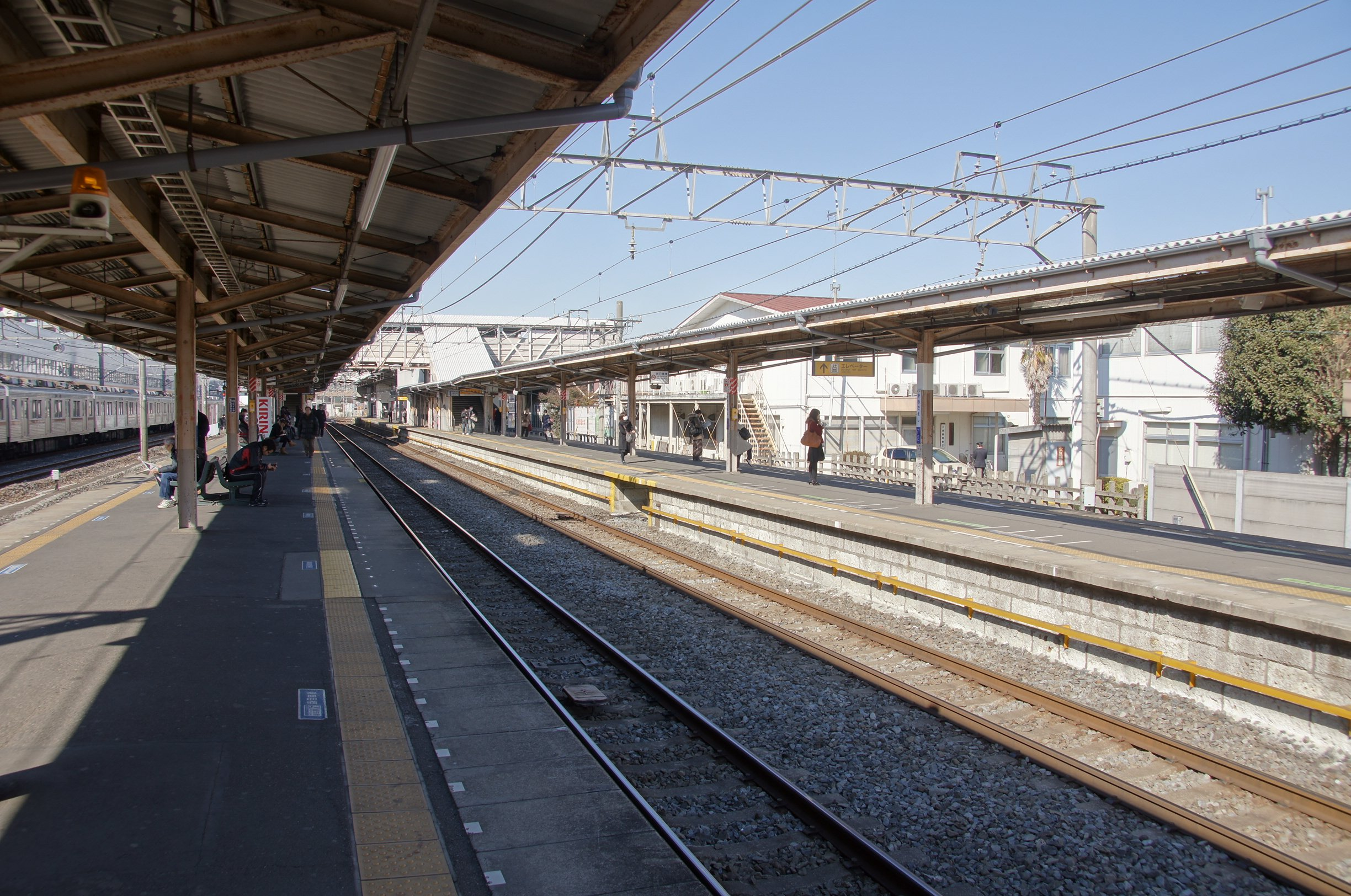
View from the up end of platforms 1 & 2 in February 2012

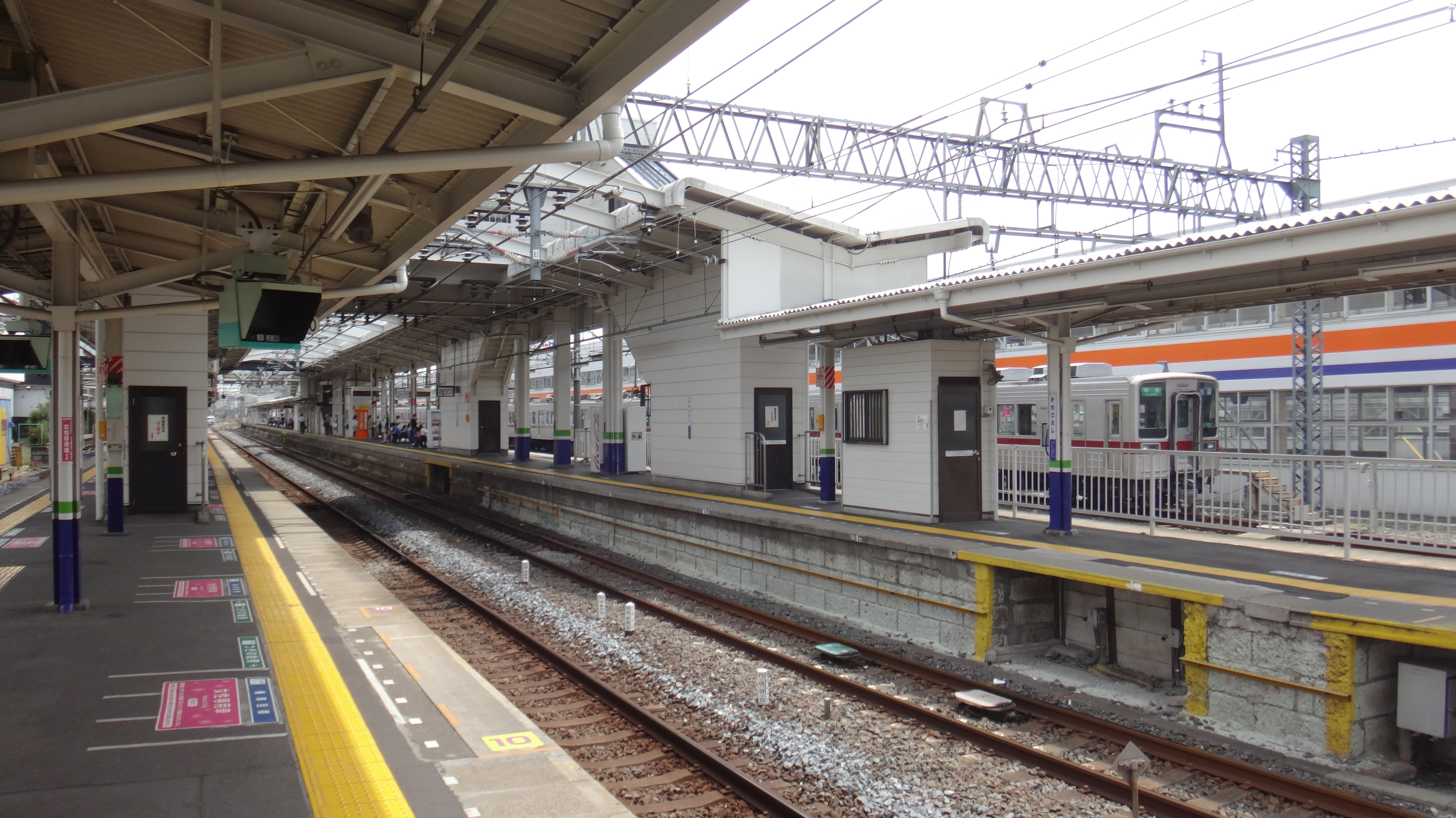
View from the down end of platforms 3 & 4 in June 2015

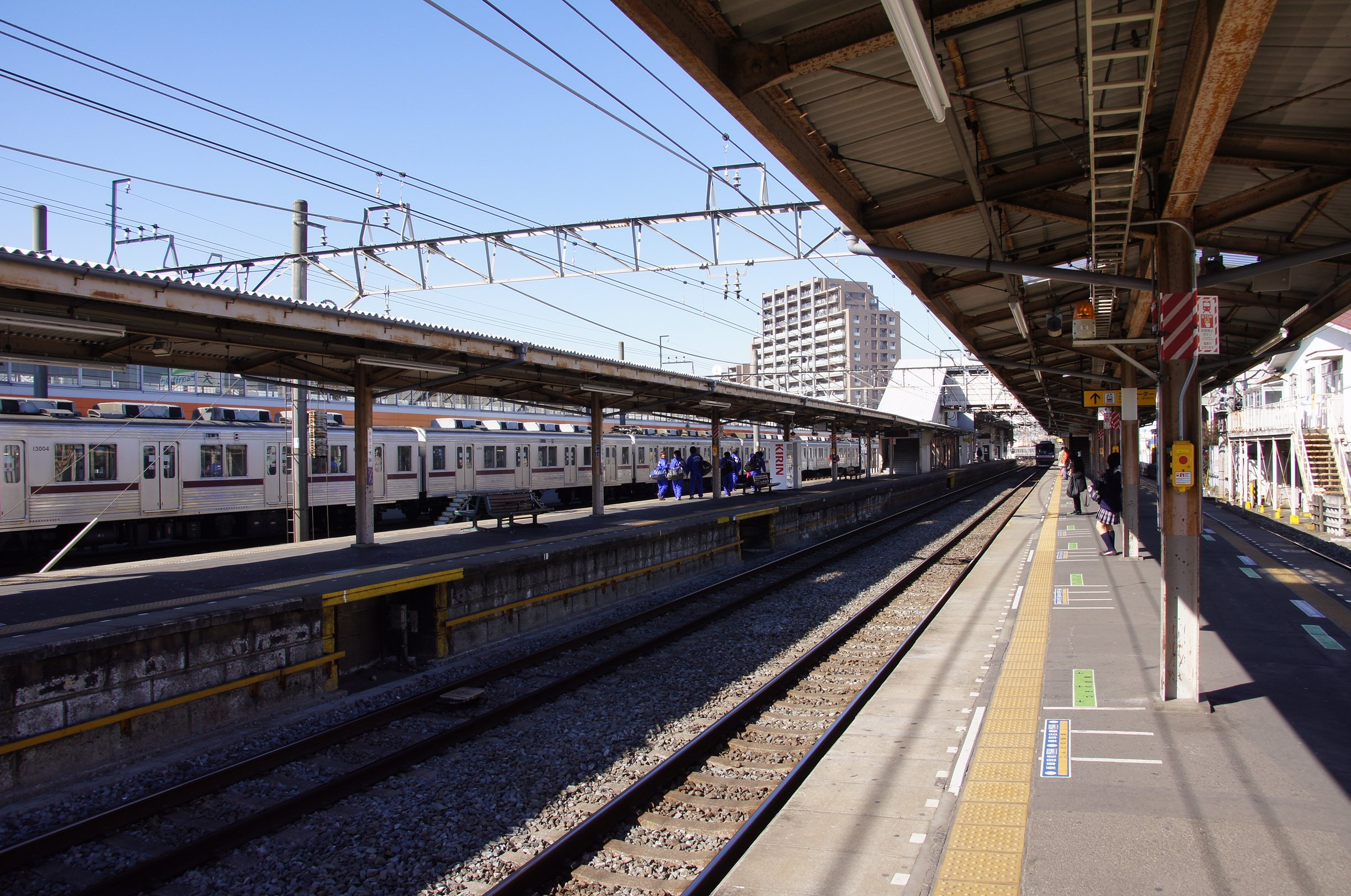
View from the up end of platforms 3 & 4 in February 2012

== History ==
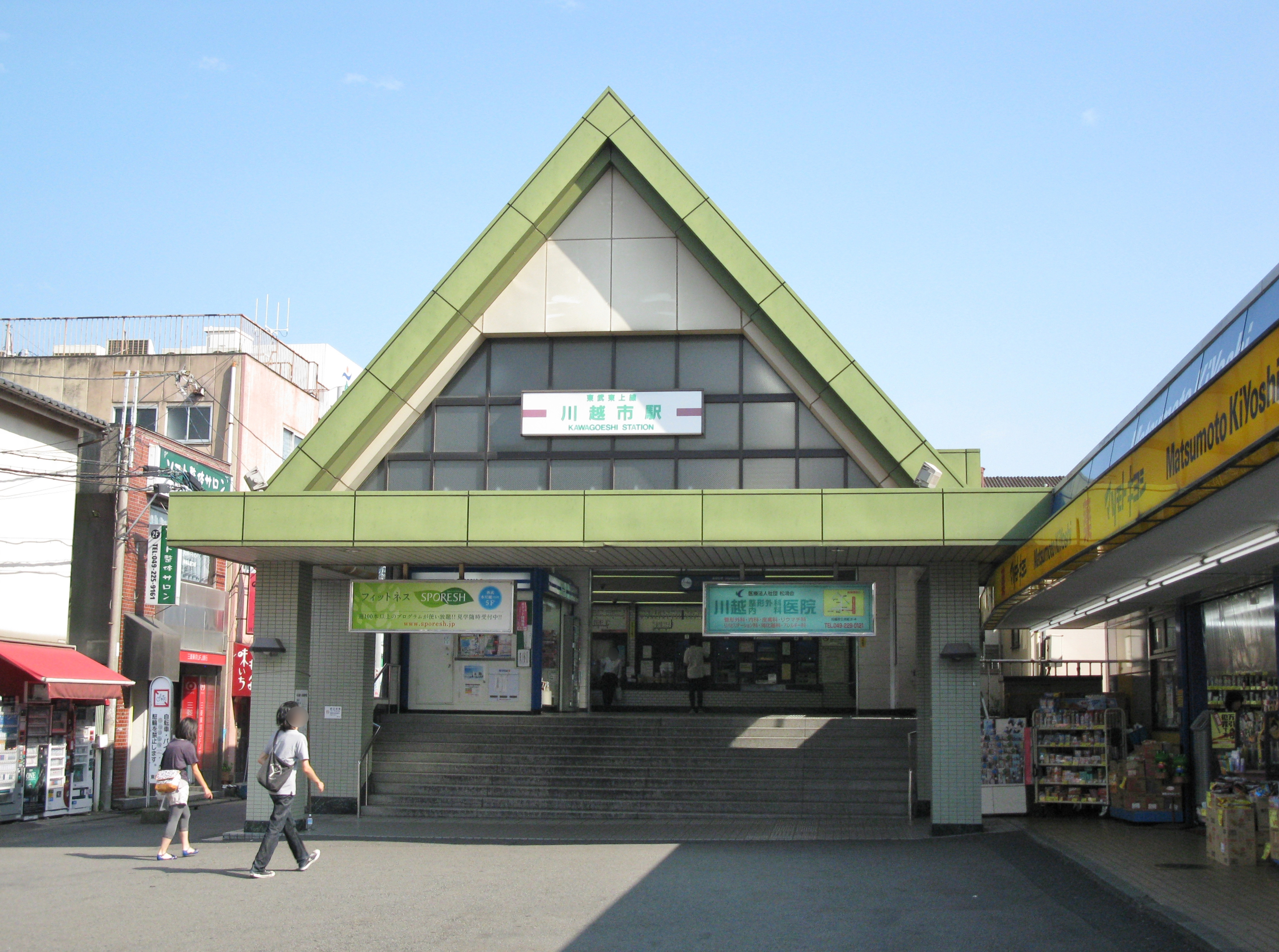
The station entrance in 2009, before the addition of an access slope

The station first opened as Kawagoe-machi Station (川越町駅) on 1 May 1914 coinciding with the opening of the Tōjō Railway line from Ikebukuro. It was renamed Kawagoeshi Station on 1 December 1922.

Through-running to and from Shibuya via the Tokyo Metro Fukutoshin Line commenced on 14 June 2008.

From 17 March 2012, station numbering was introduced on the Tōbu Tōjō Line, with Kawagoeshi Station becoming "TJ-22".

Through-running to and from Yokohama and Motomachi-Chukagai via the Tokyu Toyoko Line and Minatomirai Line commenced on 16 March 2013.

Through running to and from Shin-Yokohama and Shōnandai via the Tōkyū Shin-yokohama Line, Sōtetsu Shin-yokohama Line, Sōtetsu Main Line, and Sōtetsu Izumino Line commenced on 18 March 2023.

== Passenger statistics ==
In fiscal 2019, the station was used by an average of 47,600 passengers daily. The passenger figures for previous years are as shown below.

Fiscal year	Daily average
2010	34,702
2011	34,318
2012	34,809
2013	36,085
2014	35,968

== Surrounding area ==
=== Other stations ===
- Hon-Kawagoe Station (Seibu Shinjuku Line), approximately 5 minutes' walk

=== Civic ===
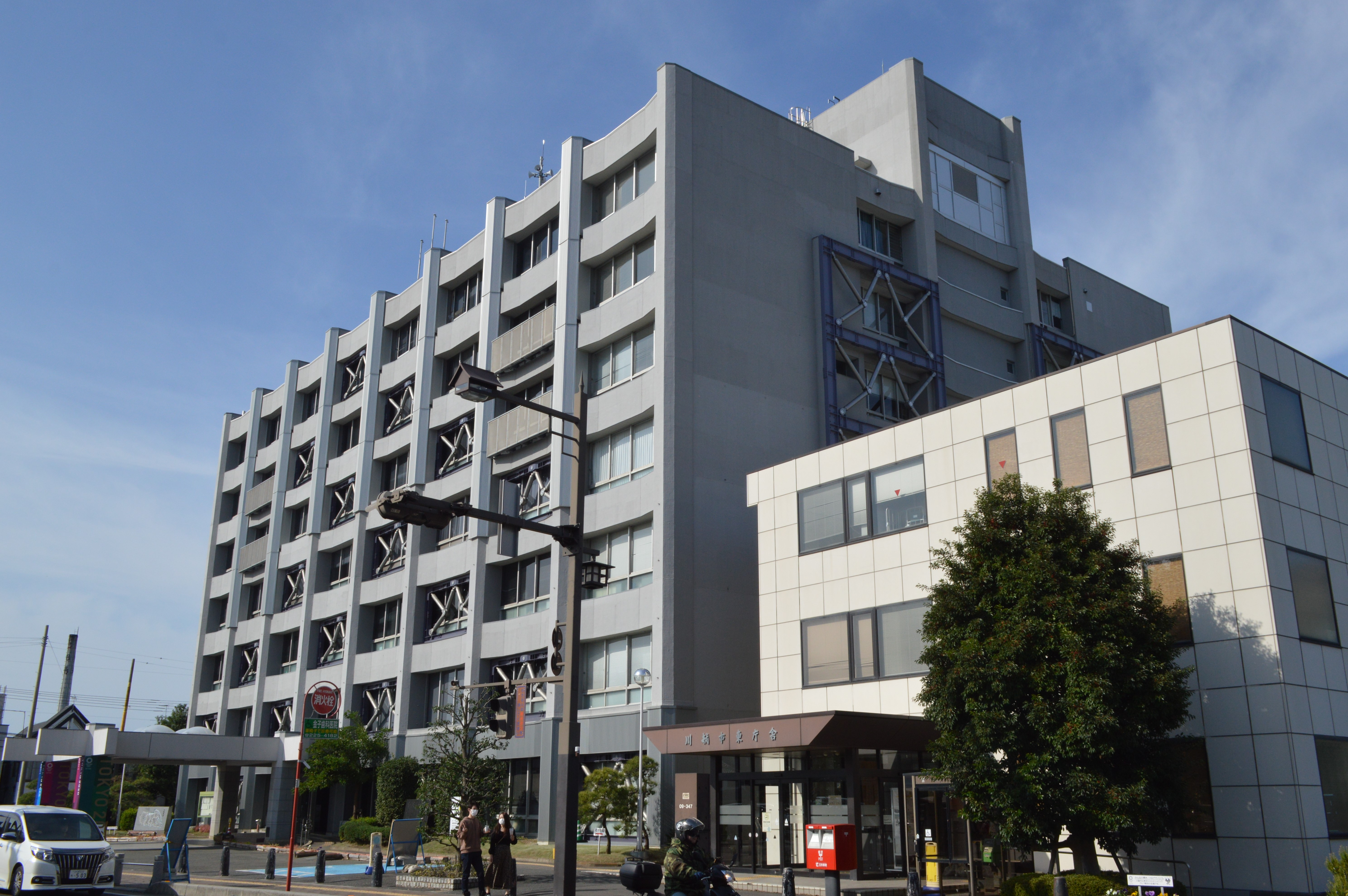
Kawagoe City Hall

- Kawagoe City Office
- Kawagoe City Library
- Kawagoe City Museum
- Kawagoe City Art Museum
- Kawagoe Municipal Swimming Pool

=== Temples and shrines ===
- Kita-in Temple
- Hikawa Shrine

=== Education ===
- Saitama Prefectural Kawagoe High School
- Saitama Prefectural Kawagoe Girls' Senior High School
- Yamamura Gakuen High School
- Hoshino High School
- Kawagoe Fujimi Junior High School

=== Commercial ===
- Bushu Gas head office
- Kawagoe Prince Hotel
- Kawagoe Tobu Hotel

== See also ==
- List of railway stations in Japan
