= Yamashita Park =

Park in Naka Ward, Yokohama, Japan

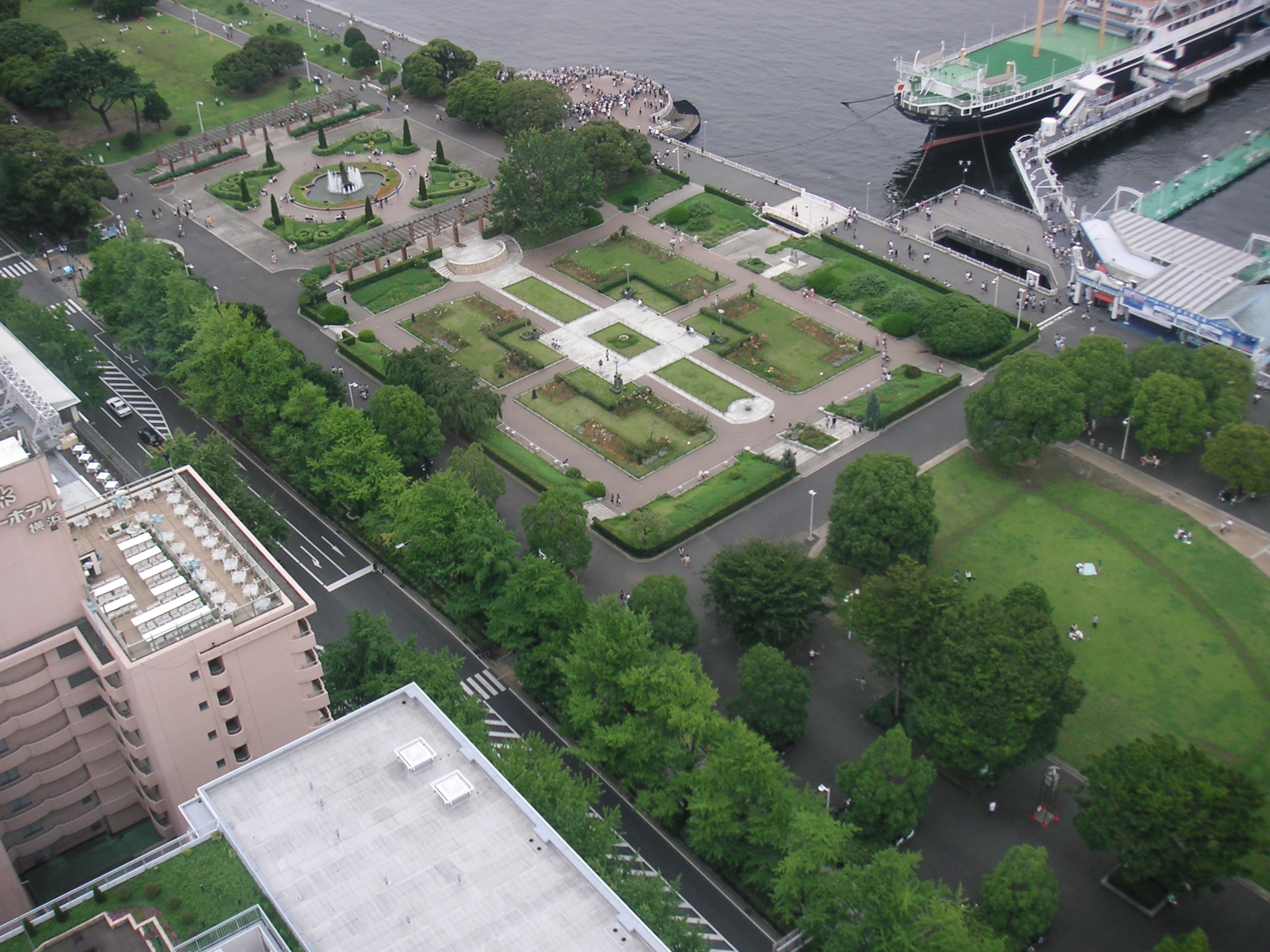
- Interactive map of Yamashita Park
- Location: Naka-ku, Yokohama, Japan
- Coordinates: 35°15′52″N 139°23′09″E
- Area: 74,121 square metres (797,830 ft^{2})
- Created: 1930

Yamashita Park (山下公園, Yamashita Kōen) is a public park in Naka Ward, Yokohama, Japan, famous for its waterfront views of the Port of Yokohama.

== History ==
Much of Yokohama was destroyed on September 1, 1923, by the Great Kantō earthquake. A Scotsman, Marshall Martin, advisor to Mayor Ariyoshi Chuichi, is credited with persuading the city government to use rubble from the Kannai commercial district to reclaim the former waterfront as a park.

Yamashita Park was formally opened on March 15, 1930.

The park was requisitioned in 1945 during the Occupation of Japan for military housing, reverting to Japanese control in 1960. Across the street from the park is the Hotel New Grand where General Douglas MacArthur spent his first night in Japan his arrival on August 30, 1945.

== Park attractions ==
As well as public green space with trees, flower beds, fountains and memorials, Yamashita Park is also noted as the location of:

- The Ōsanbashi Pier, a pier on which is built the Yokohama passenger ship terminal, which has been in continuous operation since 1896, with major renovations in 1964 and 2002.
- The Hikawa Maru, a Japanese ocean liner built in 1929 for Nippon Yūsen Kabushiki Kaisha ("NYK Line") now a museum ship.
- The Port Service, an operator of seabuses, excursion and restaurant ships, operating from the park pier. Ship services include scheduled public lines as far as Yokohama Station as well as larger charter ships.
- The Guardian of Water, a Donal Hord sculpture gifted by Yokohama's sister city San Diego in 1960. It is a replica of the Guardian of Water sculpture located in front of the San Diego County Administration Center.
- Yokohama Indian Water Fountain. Donated by the local Indian community to show its gratitude to the Japanese for aiding the Indian survivors after the 1923 Great Kantō earthquake, as well as to remember those who perished in the disaster.
- 83 years since its construction and decades of deterioration, restoration was conducted by the City of Yokohama. This restoration (2022-2023) included the repair of the interior plasterwork and the cleaning of the multifaceted mosaic pieces, ensuring the preservation of the tower.
- Girl Scout Statue - Dedicated March 18, 1962 on the Fiftieth Anniversary of the founding of the Girl Scouts. (two of the three models for the statue are Libby Watson and Hiroko Tanaka)
- Statue of the Girl with Red Shoes (Akai Kutsu)
- Monument of the Children's Song "Seagull Sailor Man"
- Monument of General Artemio Ricarte - Philippine General, erected in 1972
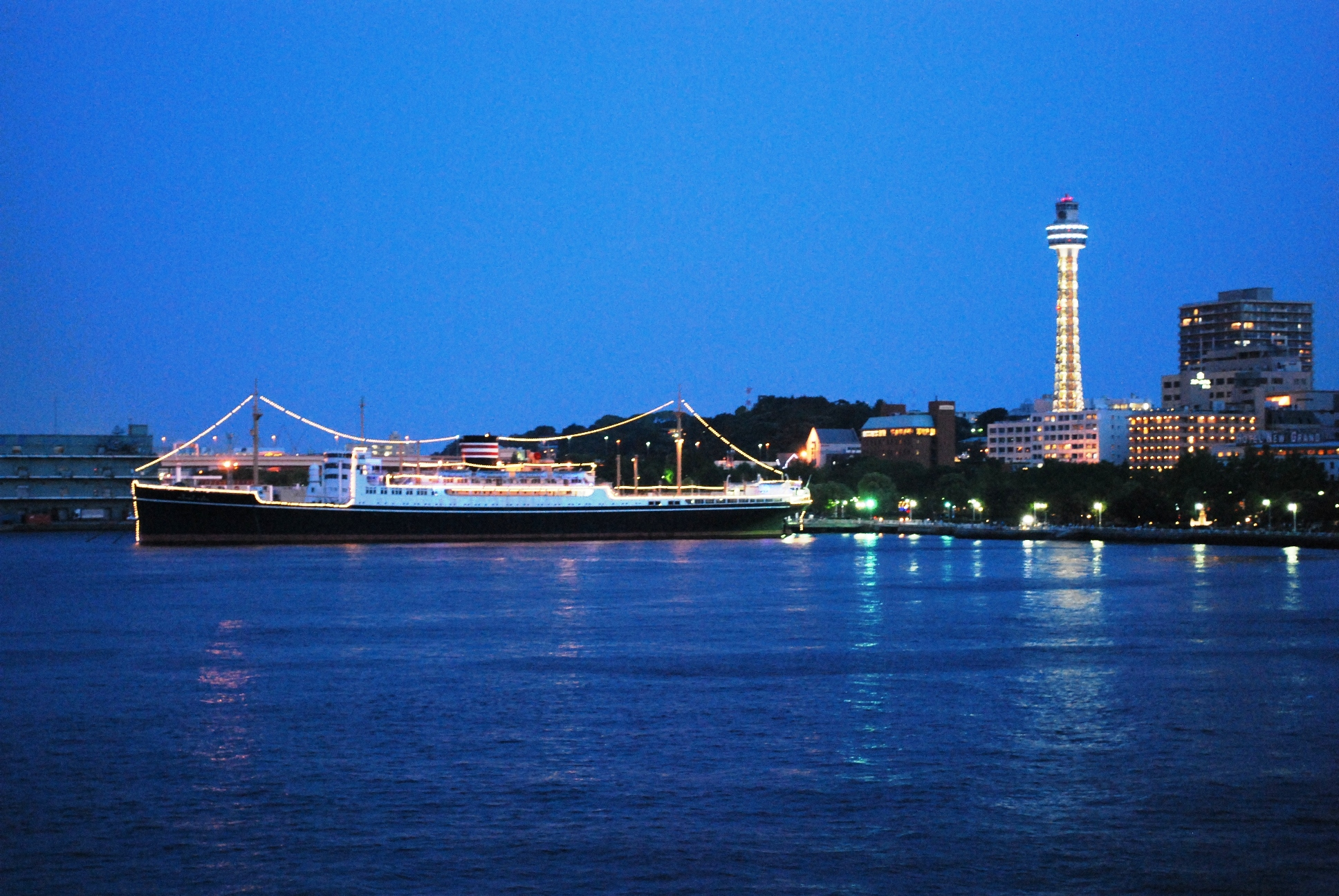
Yamashita Park, Hikawa Maru and Yokohama Marine Tower. Night view as seen from Osanbashi Pier.

Several scenes inside the park, 2023

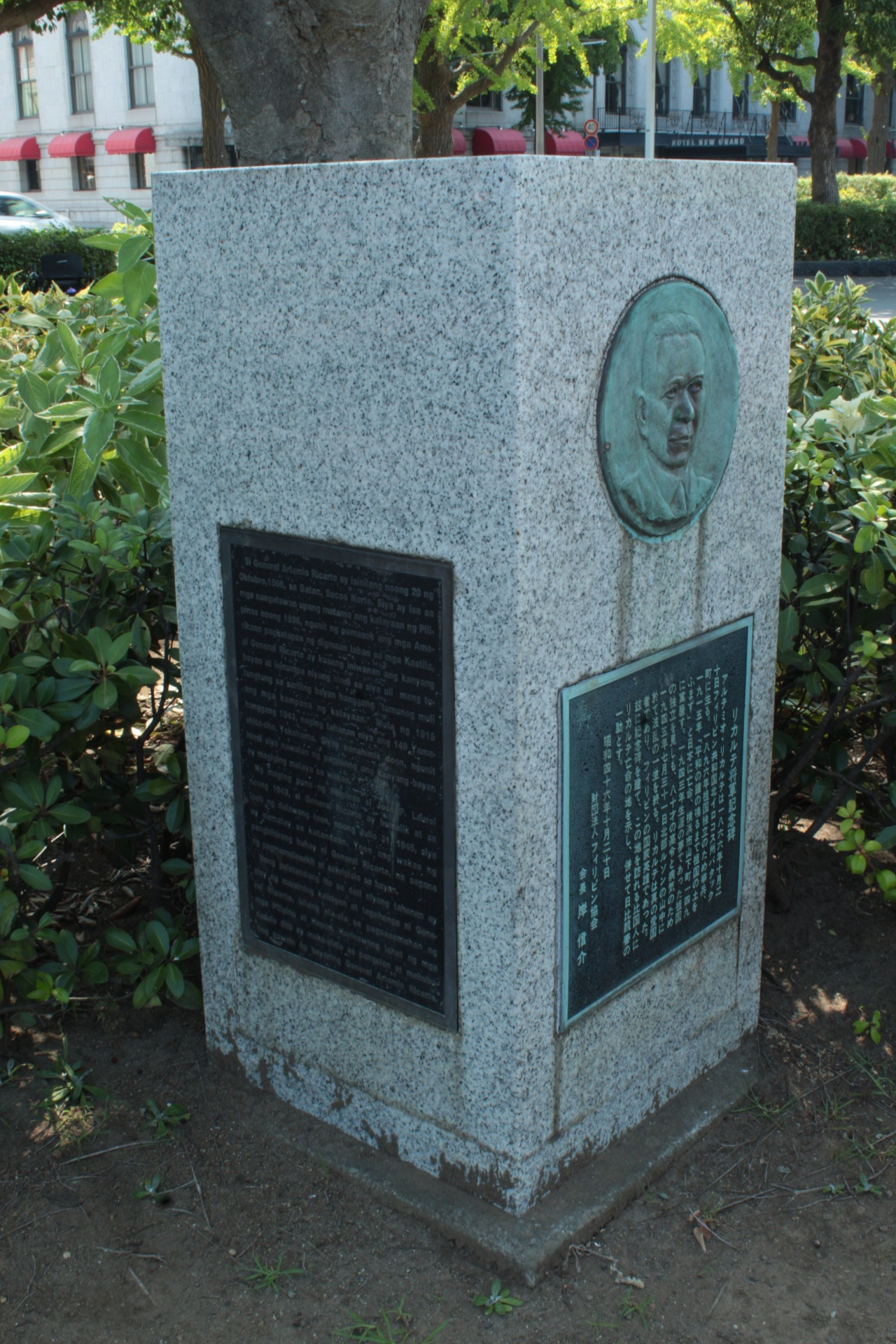
Ricarte's monument at the park

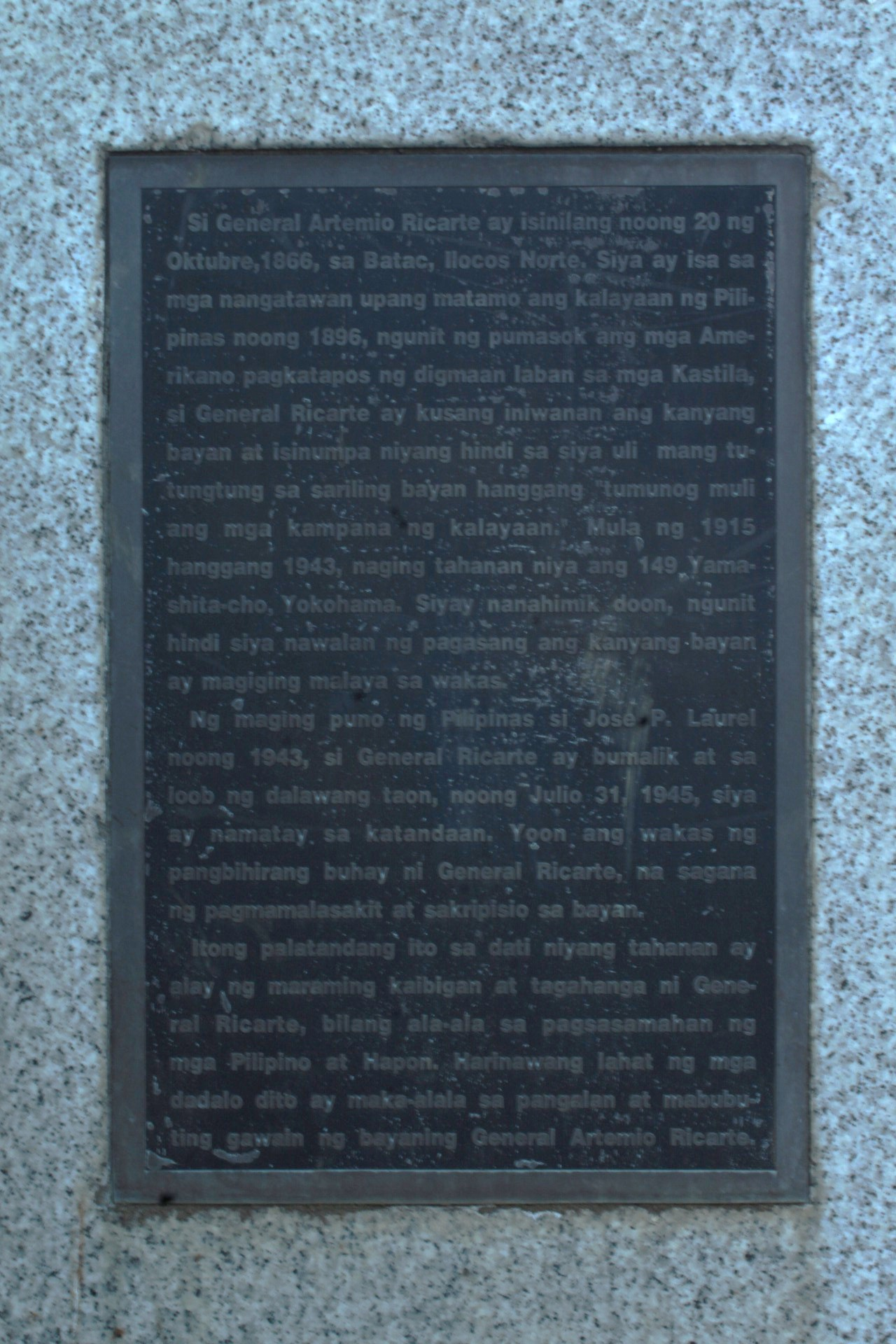
Description on Ricarte's monument

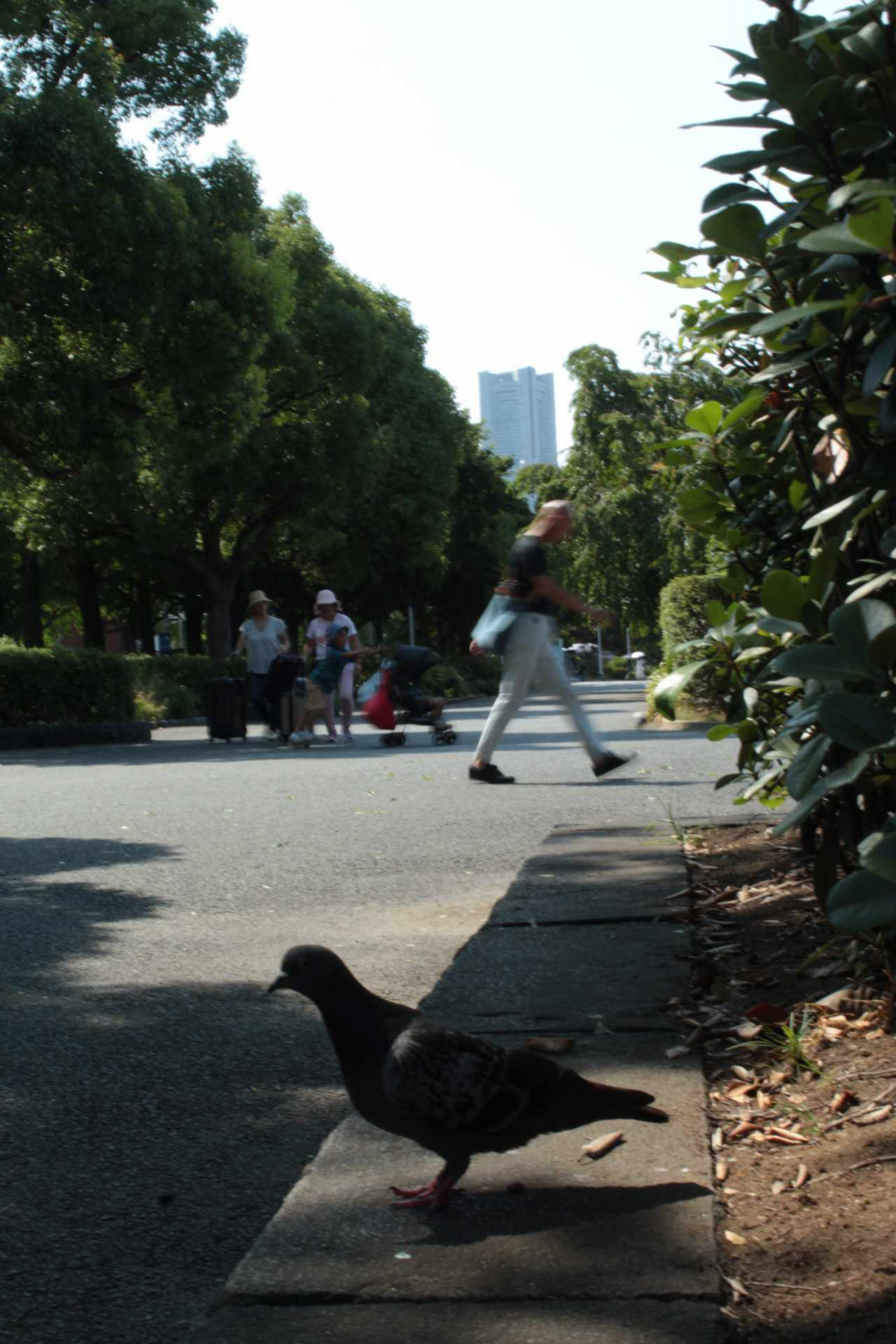
A bird at the park

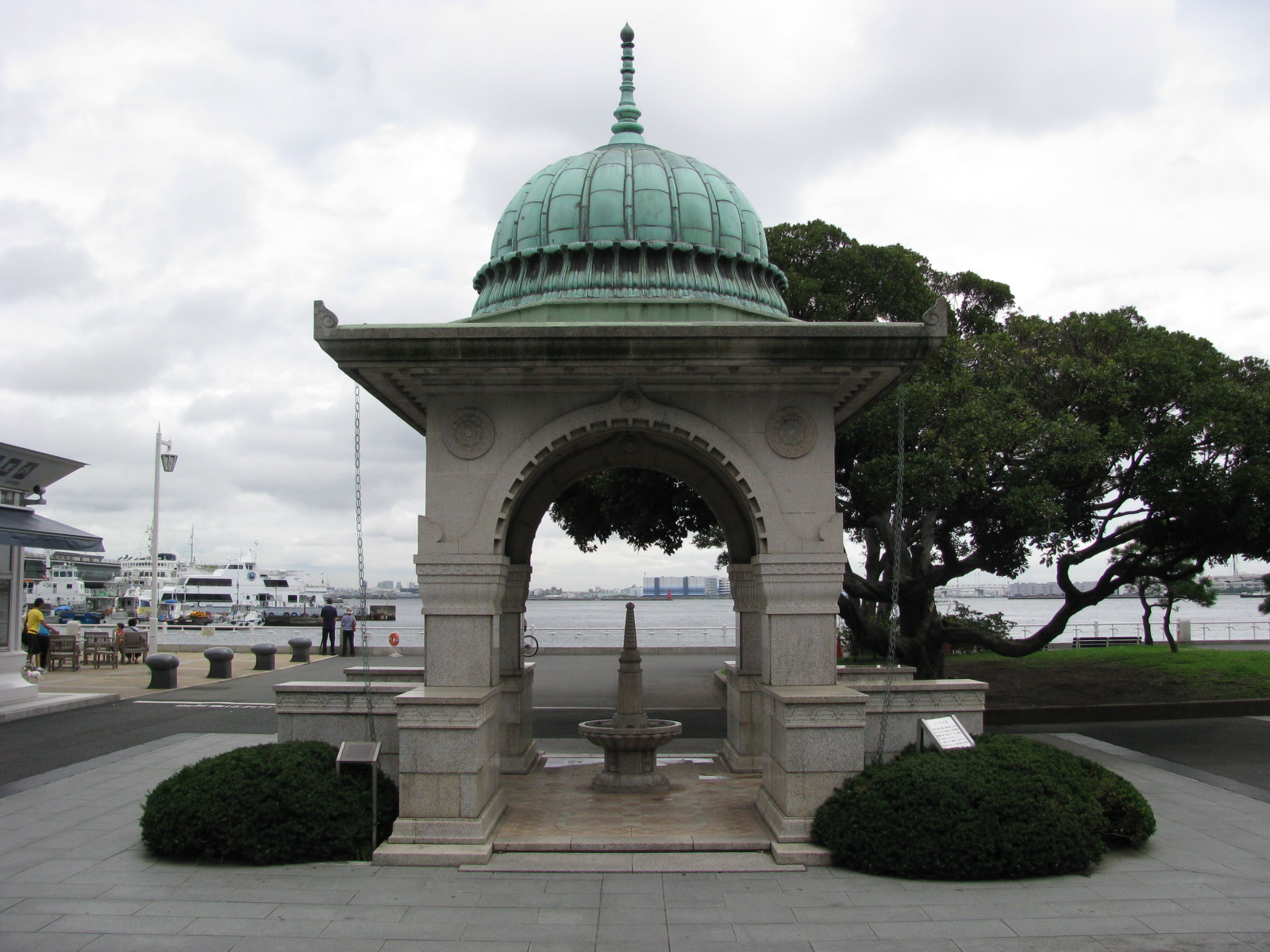
The Indian Water Fountain remembers those who perished in the 1923 Great Kanto Earthquake, including more than 90 Indians.

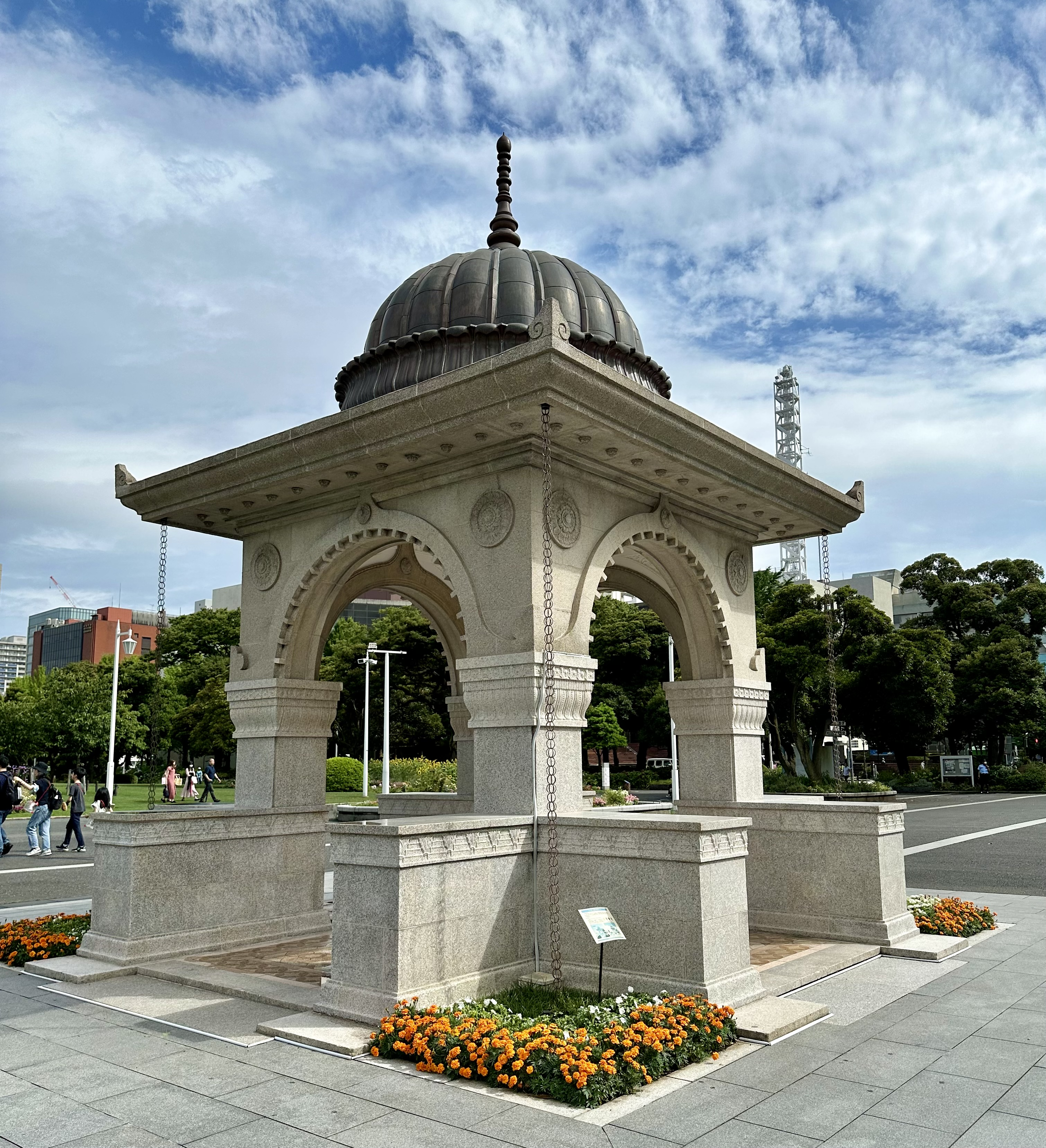
Water Fountain (2023)

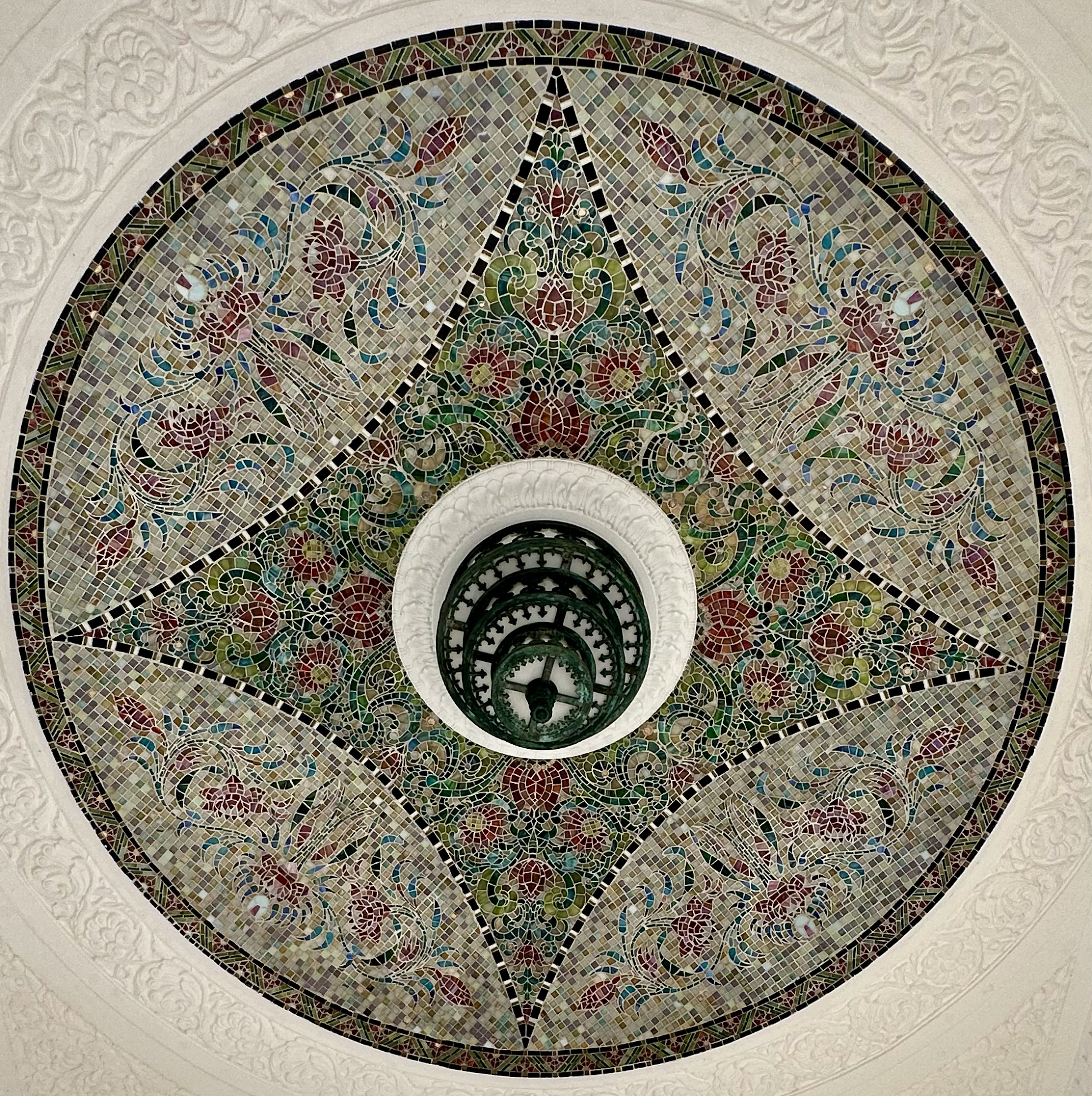
Mosaic tiles of Indian Water Fountain
