= Dorr Bothwell =

American artist, designer, educator (1902–2000)

- Born: Dorris Hodgson Bothwell; May 3, 1902; San Francisco, California, U.S.
- Died: September 24, 2000 (aged 98); Fort Bragg, California, U.S.
- Occupations: Visual artist, designer, educator, author
- Known for: Paintings, drawings, collages, prints
- Movement: California modernist, surrealist
- Spouse: Donal Hord (m. 1932–1934)
- Awards: San Francisco Women in the Arts Award (1979)

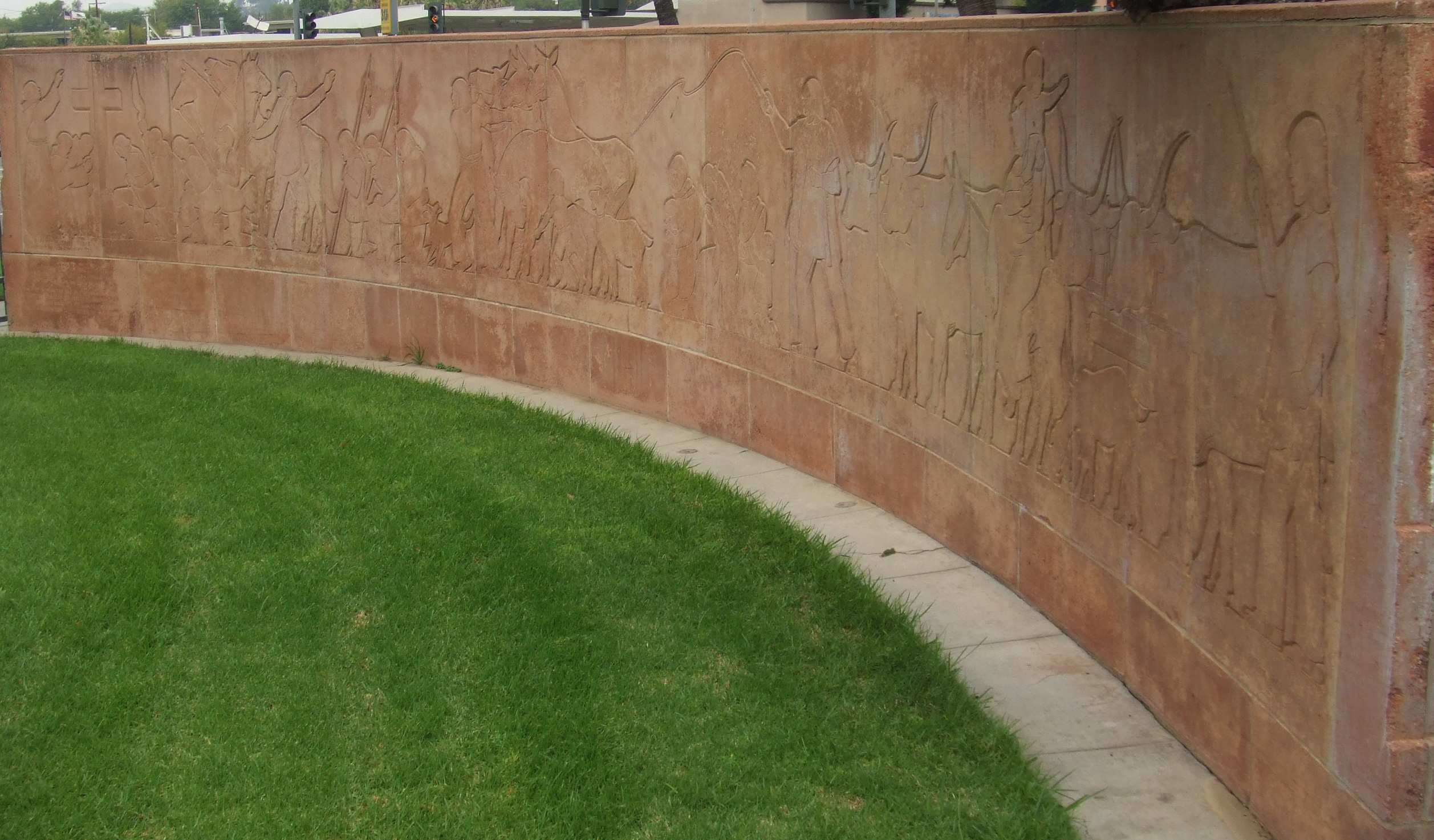
Dorr Bothwell's bas-relief, in Riverside, California, depicting Juan Bautista de Anza's 1775 colonizing expedition

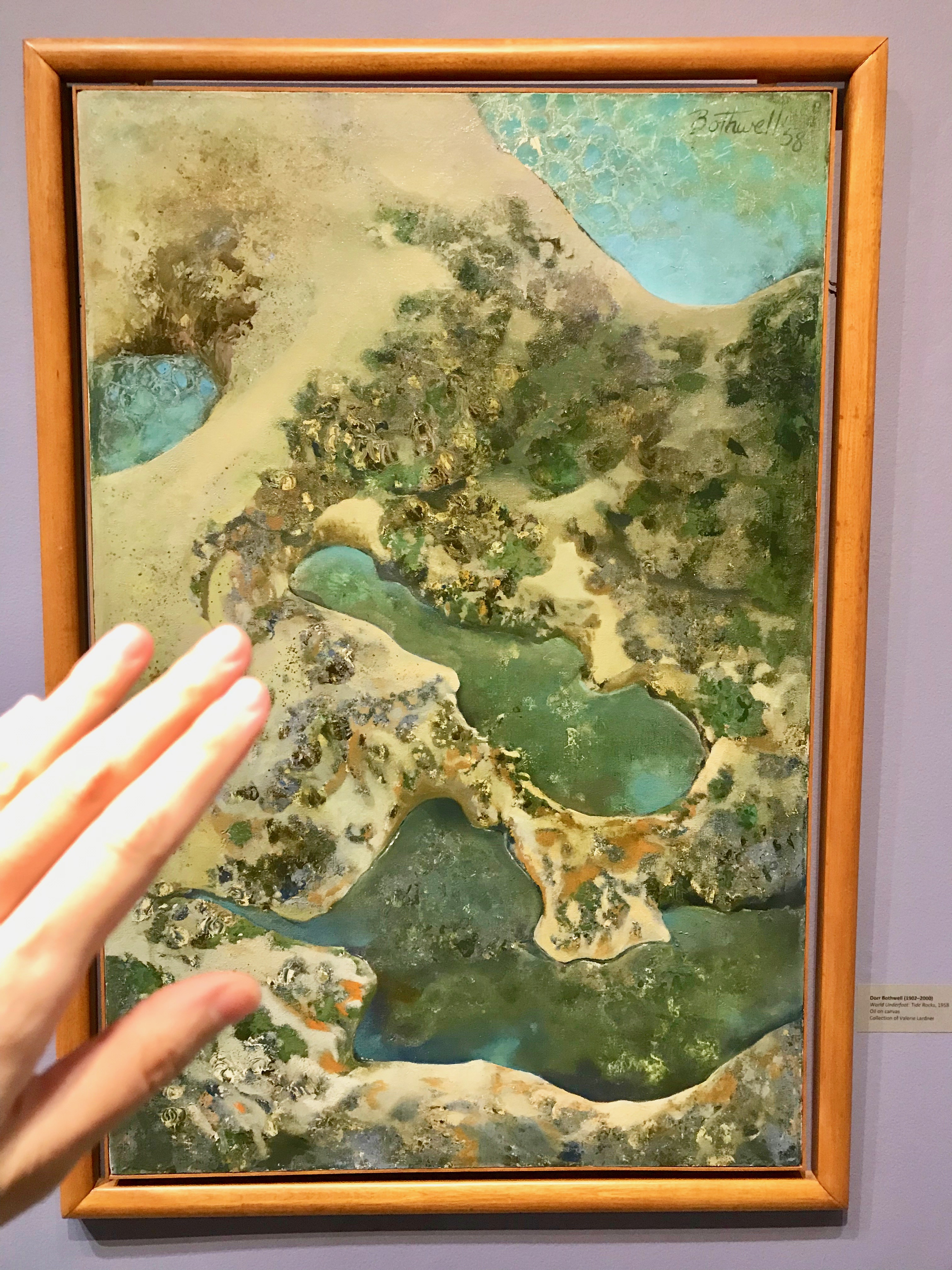
World Underfoot: Tide Rocks, 1958 by Dorr Bothwell

Dorr Hodgson Bothwell (née Dorris Hodgson Bothwell; May 3, 1902 – September 24, 2000) was an American visual artist, designer, and educator. A varied artist, Bothwell was considered a part of the San Francisco Bay Area surrealist artist scene and has paintings, drawings, collages, and prints in notable museums throughout the world. She was particularly known for her innovative use of serigraphy as a fine art form.

== Early life and education ==
Dorris Hodgson Bothwell was born on May 3, 1902, in San Francisco, California. She was later raised in San Diego, California, Bothwell knew from the age of 4 that she wanted to be an artist. As a teenager, she studied dance at the Ratliff's School for Dancing in San Diego.

Her art career began at the California School of Fine Arts (now the San Francisco Art Institute) in 1921 under the tutelage of Gottardo Piazzoni and Rudolph Schaeffer. Bothwell was married to sculptor Donal Hord in 1932 but divorced shortly after likely due to her independence in traveling and difference of opinion on "domestic duties".

== Travels ==
Bothwell's travels began in 1928, after her father died. Her destination, Samoa, was influenced by watching the film Moana and a desire to live cheaply after a change in her financial situation. She spent 1928 and 1929 living and working in Samoa where she learned the language, and was appointed taupou, adopted daughter of a Samoan village chief. Upon consenting to be tattooed, she was accepted as a full Samoan, and subsequently learned their songs, dances and ceremonies.

She spent another two years in Europe before resettling in San Diego in 1932, where she married her childhood friend, sculptor Donal Hord. Separating from Hord, she moved to Los Angeles in 1934, joining the post-surrealist group around Lorser Feitelson and Helen Lundeberg, and participating in the mural division of the Federal Arts Project, where she learned the art of screenprinting, which would become her favored graphic technique. She returned to San Francisco in 1942. She traveled to Paris in 1949/51, to Africa in 1966/67, to England, France and the Netherlands in 1970, to Bali, Java and Sumatra in 1974, and to China and Japan in 1982/85.

== Notan (1968) ==
In 1968, Dorr Bothwell and Marlys Mayfield wrote Notan – on the Interaction of Positive and Negative Spaces. It was first reissued in 1976, and the first Danish translation was published in 1977. In 1991 the book was republished by Dover Publications as Notan: The Dark-Light Principle of Design; it has been in print continuously since then.

== Honors and collections ==
Bothwell received many honors in her lifetime, including an Abraham Rosenberg Fellowship, the 1979 San Francisco Women in the Arts Award and two Pollock-Krasner grants for 1998–2000.

Her art is in the collections of the Metropolitan Museum of Art, Museum of Modern Art, the Whitney Museum of American Art, the Bibliothèque Nationale in Paris, the Victoria & Albert Museum in London and the Hunterian Museum and Art Gallery, Glasgow, Scotland.

== Teaching ==
Bothwell taught at the San Francisco Art Institute, the Mendocino Art Center, the Parsons School of Design in New York, the Ansel Adams Photography Workshops in Yosemite and the Victor School of Photography in Colorado.

== Publications ==
- Bothwell, Dorr. Dorr Bothwell's African Sketchbook. Monica Hannasch, editor. Arti Grafiche Ambrosini – Roma, 2000. Print.
- Bothwell, Dorr and Mayfield, Marlys. Notan: The Dark-Light Principle of Design. ISBN 0-486-26856-X. Dover Publications, 1991. Print.

== Sources ==
- Bowers, Karen. "Dorr Bothwell: Original Prints from Three Decades", Arts & Entertainment Magazine, March/April 1999. Mendocino Art Center, Mendocino, California. Print.
- "Dorr Bothwell Biography" (ArtScene, undated)
- Fort, Ilene Susan. "The Adventurers, the Eccentrics, and the Dreamers: Women Modernists of Southern California", Independent Spirits: Women Painters of the American West, 1890–1945. Patricia Trenton, editor. ISBN 978-0-520-20203-0. University of California Press, 1995. Pages 76, 80, 82, 86, 89, 95, 98. Print.
- Landauer, Susan. "Searching for Selfhood: Woman Artists of Northern California", Independent Spirits: Women Painters of the American West, 1890–1945. Patricia Trenton, editor.ISBN 978-0-520-20203-0. University of California Press, 1995. Pages 25, 32, 37, 38. Print.
- Oliver, Myrna. "Dorr Bothwell; Painter Lived Nomadic Life." Los Angeles Times, 21 September 2000: B-8. Print.
- Richard, Valliere T. "Dorr Bothwell: Edited Biography." Arts & Entertainment Magazine, March/April 1999. Mendocino Art Center, Mendocino, California.
- Stevenson, Charles. "Local Artists on Avant Garde: Charles Stevenson talks about the onward march of culture and other things related to the avant garde." Arts & Entertainment Magazine, March 1981. Antonia Lamb, editor. Mendocino Art Center, Mendocino, California. Pages 8, 9. Print.
