= Morning (Hord) =

Sculpture by Donal Hord in San Diego, California, U.S.

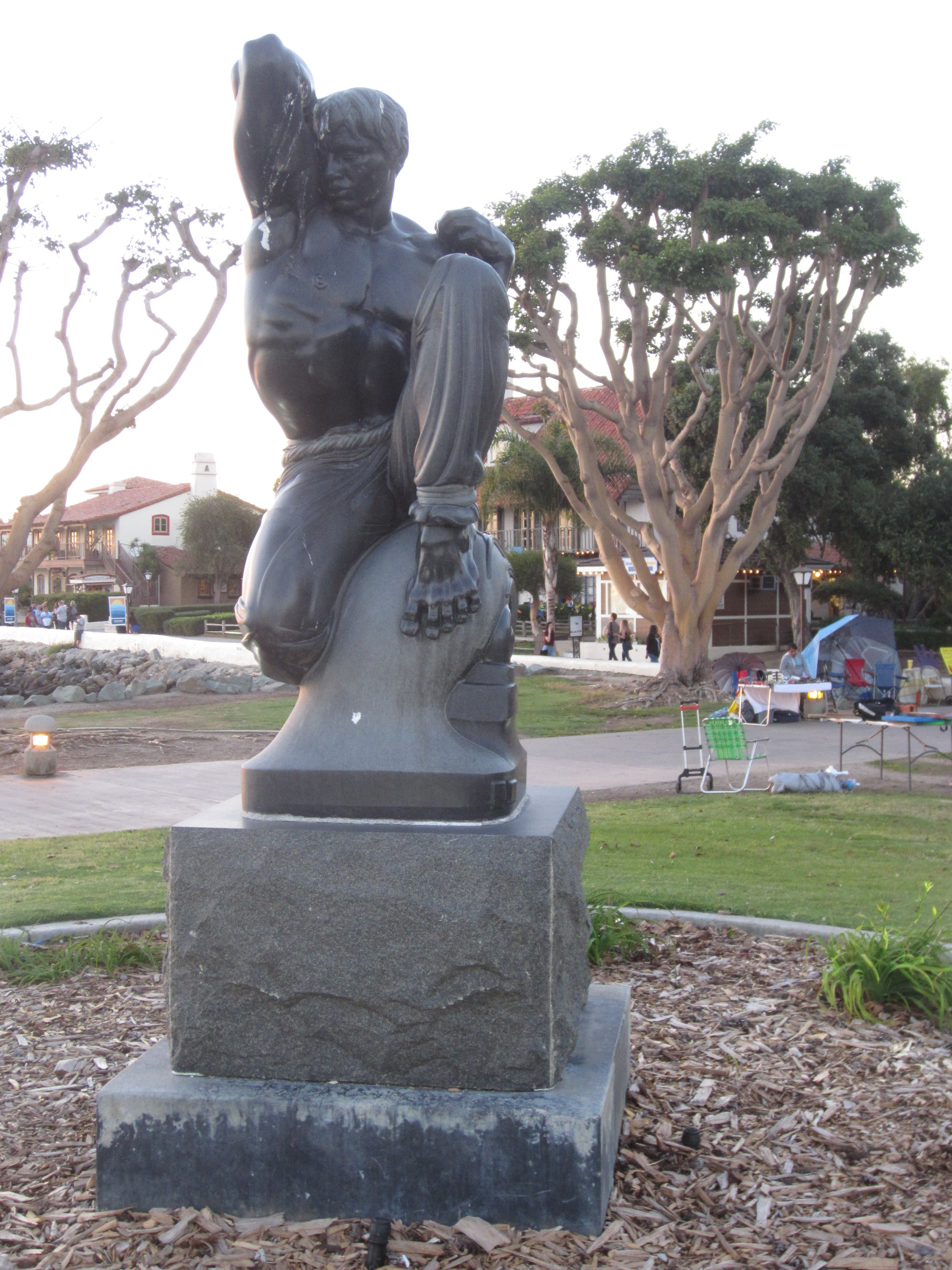
- The sculpture in 2016
- Artist: Donal Hord
- Medium: Black granite
- Location: San Diego, California, U.S.
- 32°42′30″N 117°10′12″W

Morning, also known as Morning Statue, is an outdoor sculpture by Donal Hord, installed at Embarcadero Marina Park North in San Diego, California. The 6-foot, 3-inch black granite statue depicts a muscular young man stretching. It was created between 1951 and 1956, and was kept at Hord's residence until being acquired by the Port of San Diego in 1983.

== See also ==
- 1956 in art
