= Embarcadero Marina Park North =

Park in San Diego, California, U.S.

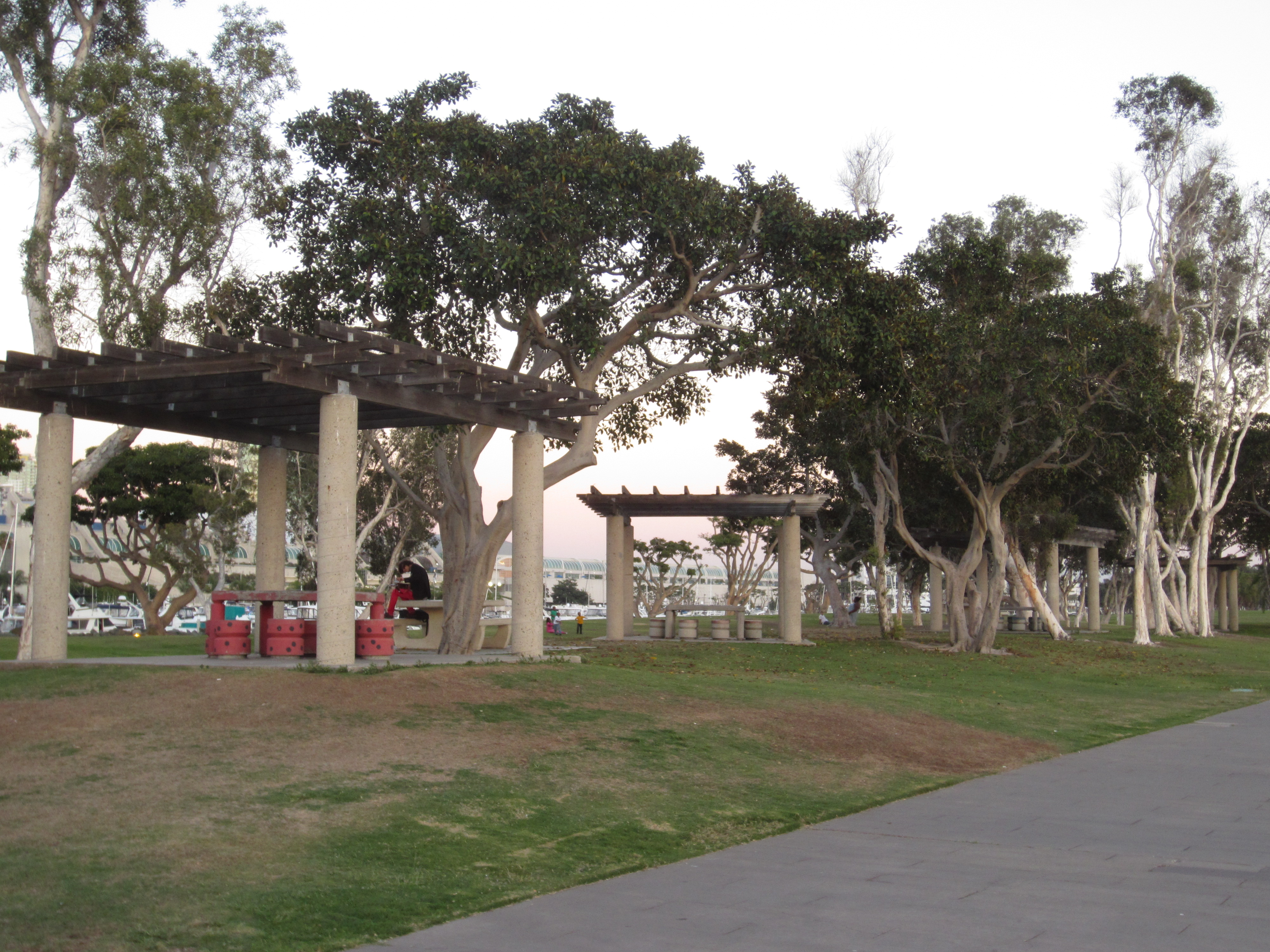
- Picnic tables at the park, 2016

- Location within San Diego Location within California Location within the United States
- Type: Public
- Location: San Diego, California, U.S.
- Coordinates: 32.707°N 117.169°W
- Area: 8.5 acres (0.034 km^{2})
- Status: Open year round

Embarcadero Marina Park North is a park in San Diego, California. It features Donal Hord's 1956 sculpture Morning.

== See also ==
- Embarcadero Marina Park South
