= Woman of Tehuantepec (sculpture) =

Fountain and sculpture in San Diego, California, U.S.

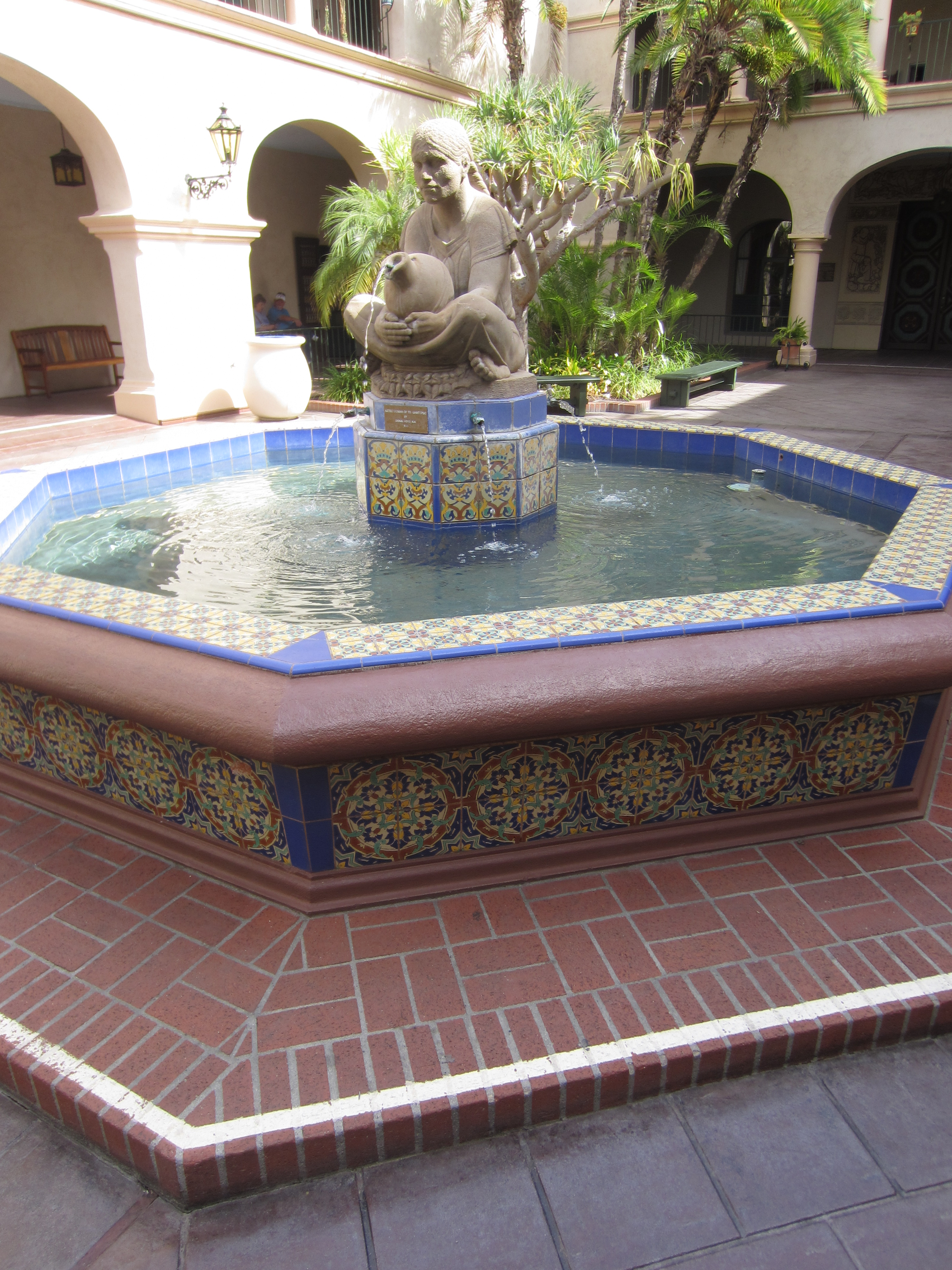
- The fountain and sculpture in 2016
- Artist: Donal Hord
- Year: 1935
- Location: San Diego, California, U.S.
- 32°43′52″N 117°08′59″W

Woman of Tehuantepec, also known as Aztec Woman of Tehuantepec, is an outdoor 1935 fountain and sculpture by Donal Hord, installed in the courtyard of Balboa Park's House of Hospitality, in San Diego, California.

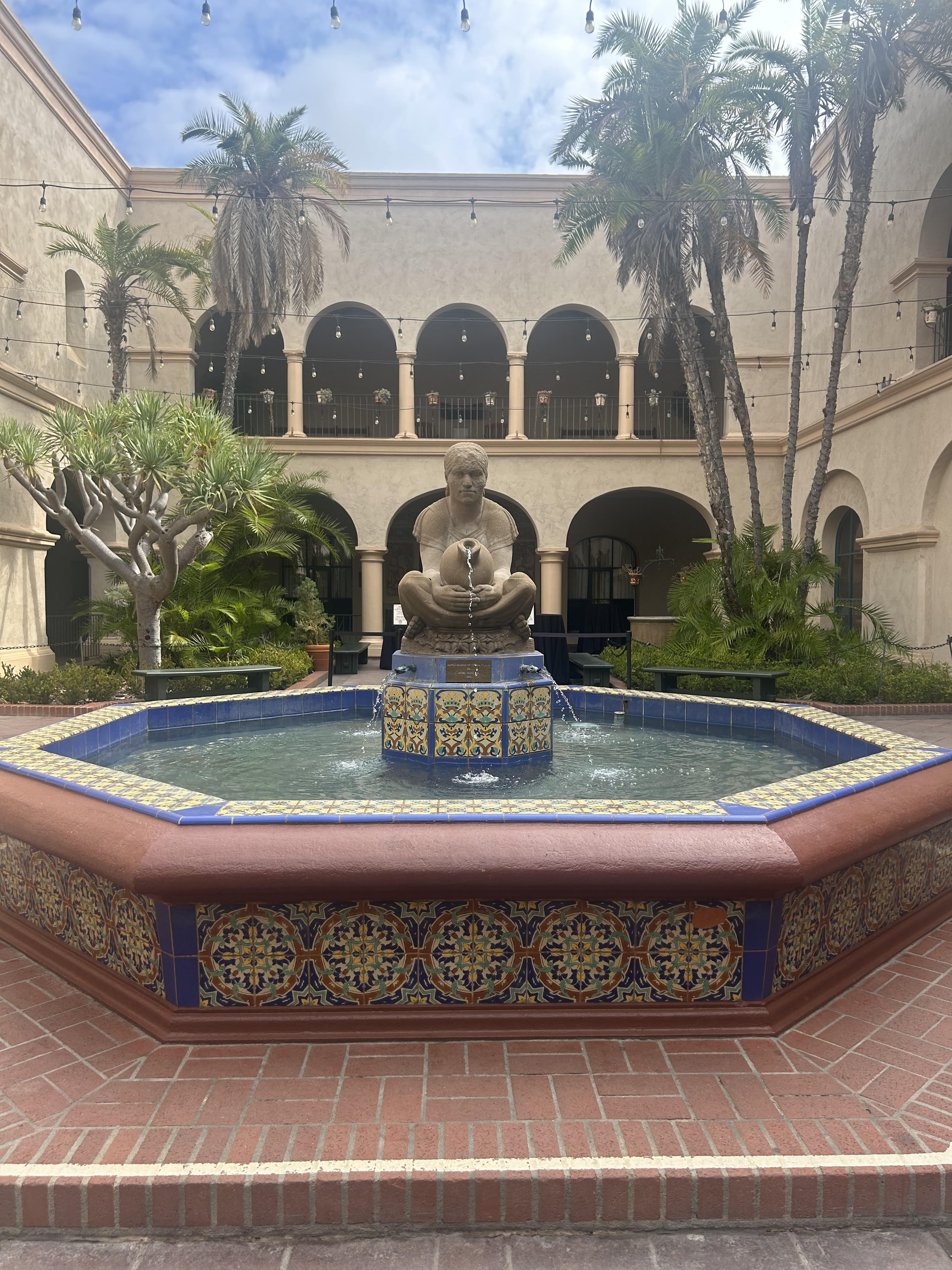
The fountain in 2024

== See also ==
- 1935 in art
