= Yokohama Marine Tower =

Yokohama Marine Tower Yokohama 横浜マリンタワー灯台
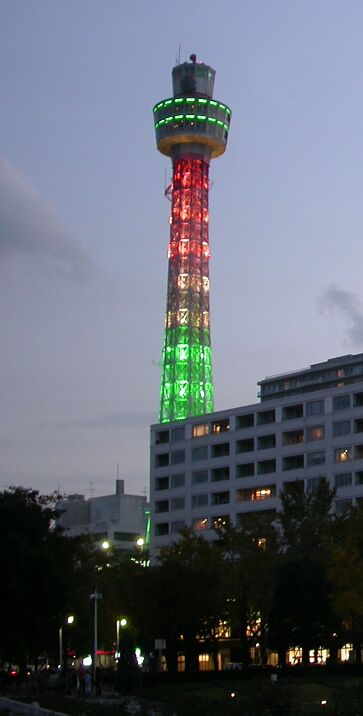
- Yokohama Marine Tower in November 2005 as seen from Yamashita Park
- Location: Yokohama Inner Harbour; Japan
- Coordinates: 35°26′38.2″N 139°39′03.2″E

Tower
- Constructed: 1961
- Built by: Shimizu Corporation, IHI Corporation
- Construction: steel lattice tower
- Height: 348 feet (106 m)
- Shape: 10 sided conical
- Markings: silver skeleton, olive brown structure
- Operator: Yokohama Marine Tower

Light
- Deactivated: 2008
- Focal height: 341 feet (104 m)
- Range: 25 nautical miles (46 km; 29 mi)
- Characteristic: Al Fl R G 20s.
- Japan no.: ex-JCG-2119

Yokohama Marine Tower (横浜マリンタワー, Yokohama Marin Tawā) is a 106 metres (348 feet) high lattice tower with an observation deck at a height of 100 metres in Naka Ward, Yokohama, Japan.

The light characteristic is marked by a flash every twenty seconds, whereby the light's colour is alternating red and green. Originally, at night, the tower shaft itself was lit green and red according to its markings, but now, after the reopening in May 2009, the lights are white.

== History ==
Yokohama Marine Tower was inaugurated in 1961. The Marine Tower is billed "the tallest lighthouse in the world", although this depends on what lighthouses are considered. In clear conditions, visitors can see Mount Fuji from the 100-metre high observation deck.

On December 25, 2006, Marine Tower temporarily shut its doors. Then the city of Yokohama took over ownership, to restore it. After the renovations, Marine Tower was reopened on May 23, 2009, in time for the city's 150th anniversary celebrations. The facility closed again in April 2019 for further renovations, and reopened for the second time on September 1, 2022.

== In popular culture ==
- Ghidorah, the Three-Headed Monster
- Godzilla vs. Mothra
- Godzilla, Mothra and King Ghidorah: Giant Monsters All-Out Attack
- Digimon Data Squad
- Digimon Savers: Ultimate Power! Activate Burst Mode!!
- Superior Ultraman 8 Brothers
- Revolutionary Girl Utena
- From Up On Poppy Hill
- Studio Apartment, Good Lighting, Angel Included (manga)
- Dear Brother (Anime)
- Glass Mask (Anime)
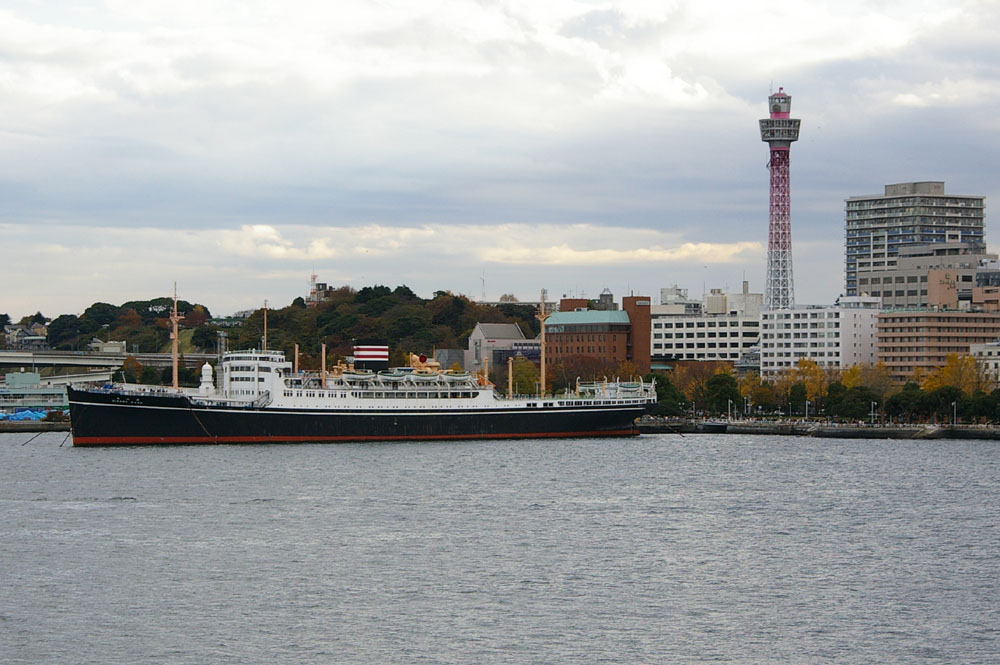

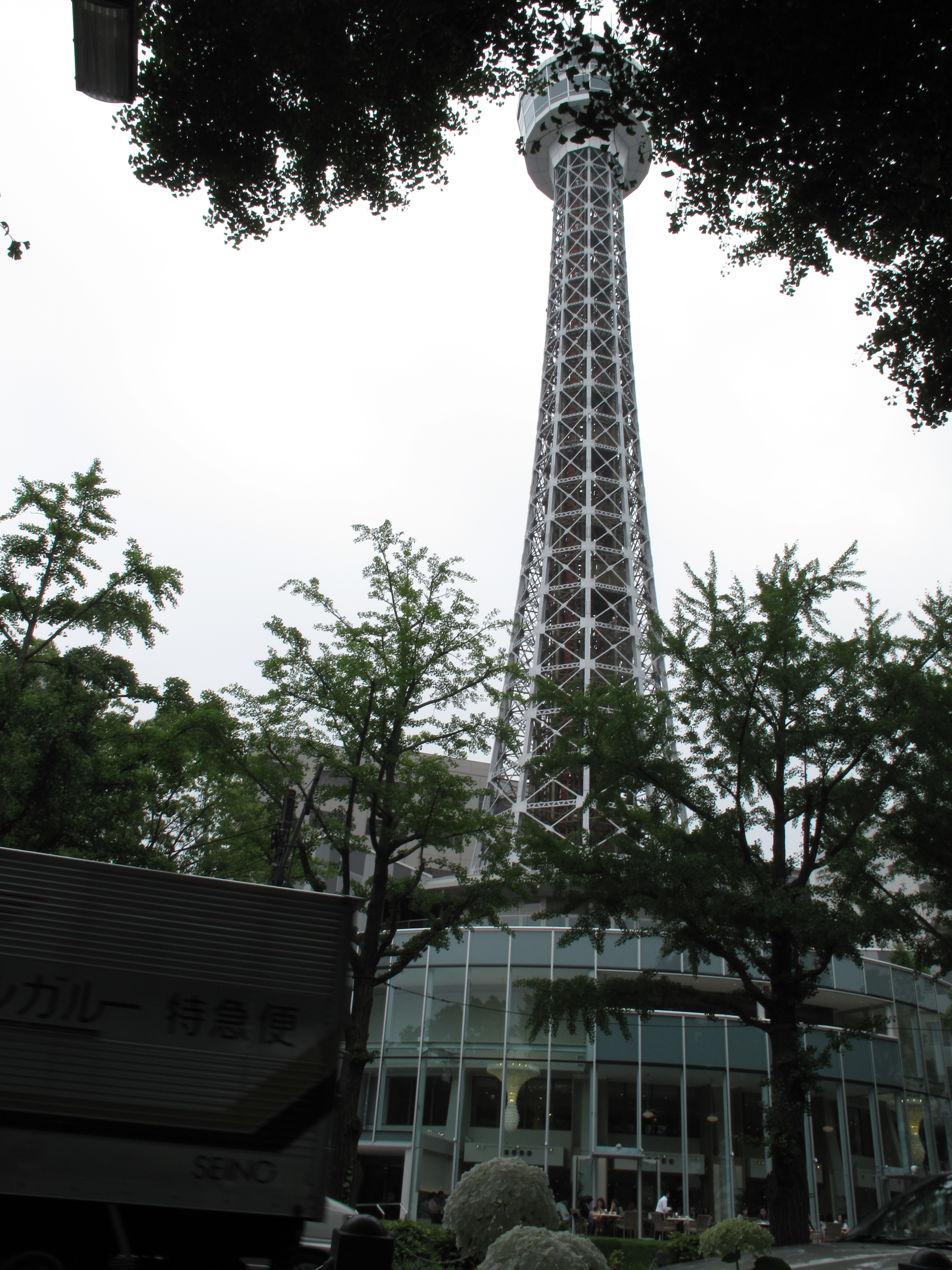

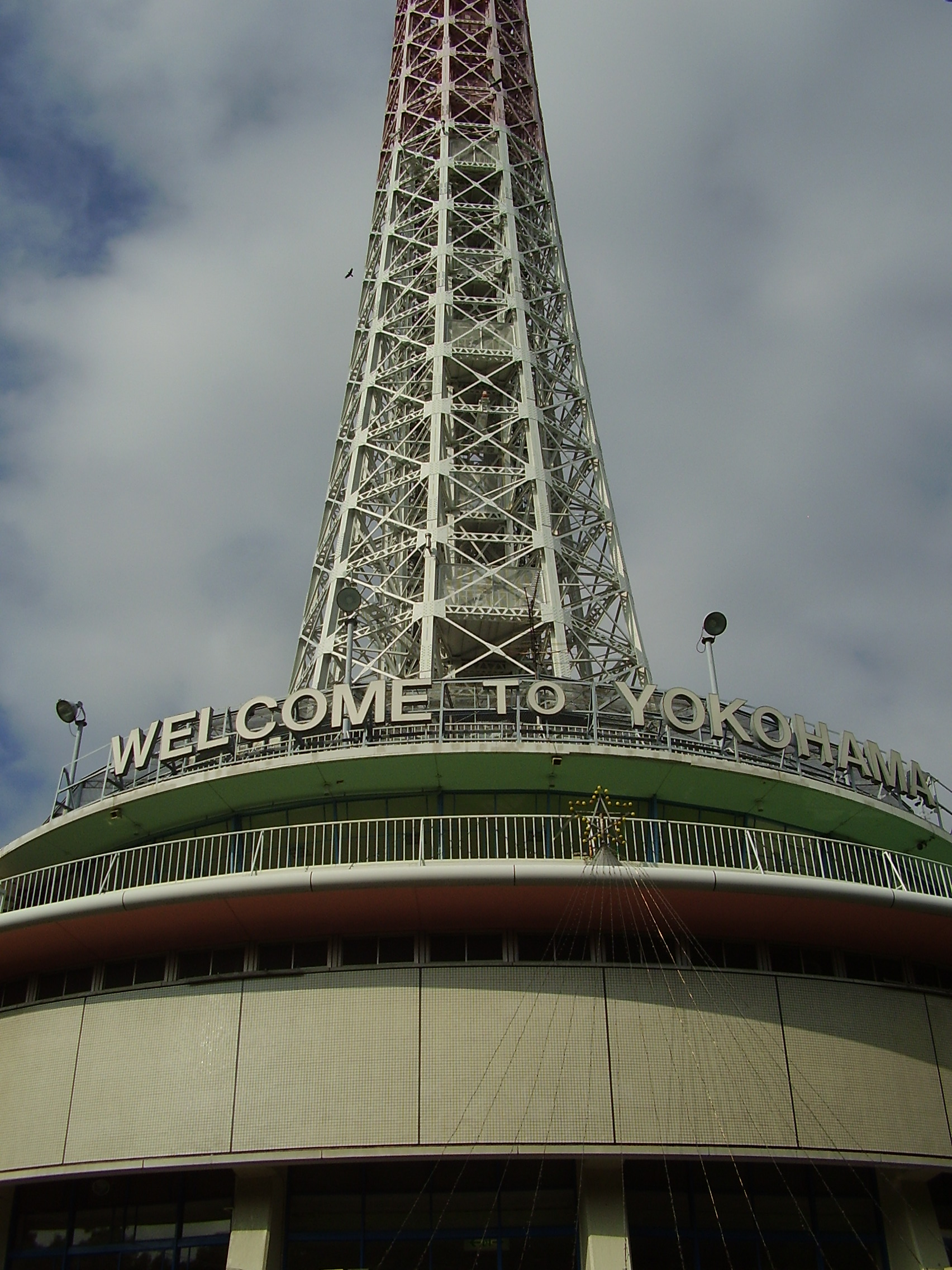

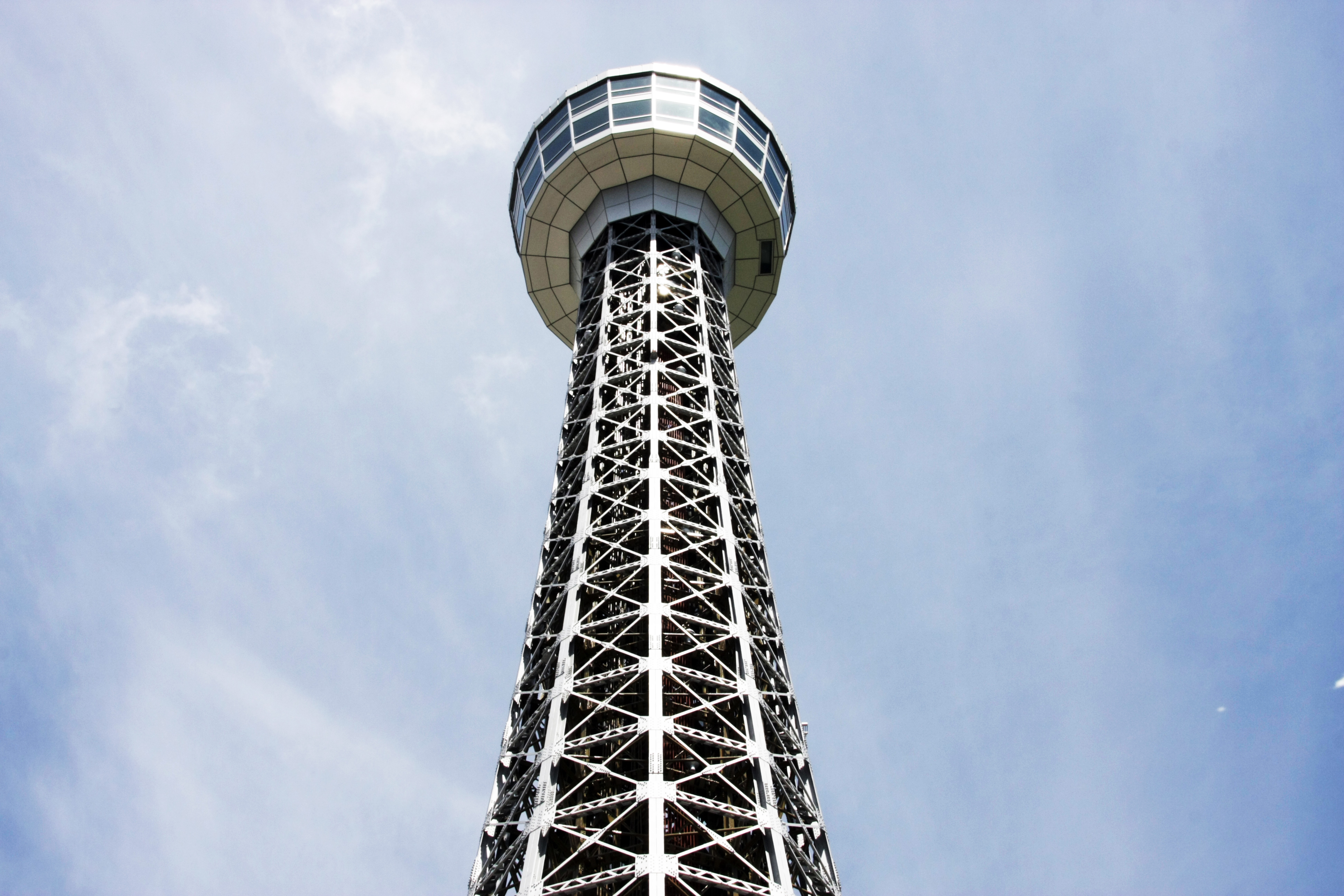

== See also ==
- List of lighthouses in Japan
- List of tallest lighthouses in the world
