= Guardian of Water =

Fountain and sculpture in San Diego, California, U.S.

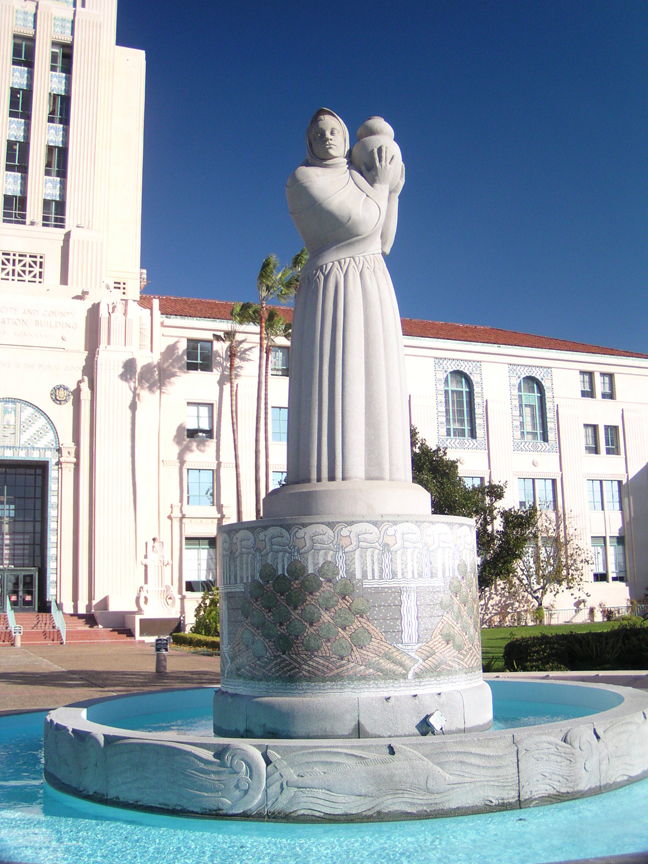
- The sculpture's obverse
- Artist: Donal Hord
- Year: 1939
- Location: San Diego, California, U.S.
- 32°43′19″N 117°10′22″W

Guardian of Water is a 1939 fountain and sculpture by Donal Hord, installed outside the San Diego County Administration Center, in the U.S. state of California. The statue was dedicated on June 10, 1939.

In 1960, a replica of the fountain and sculpture was sent as a gift to San Diego's sister city of Yokohama by the San Diego-Yokohama Friendship Commission. It stands by the waterfront in Yokohama's Yamashita Park.

== See also ==
- 1939 in art
