= Embarcadero Marina Park South =

Park in San Diego, California, U.S.

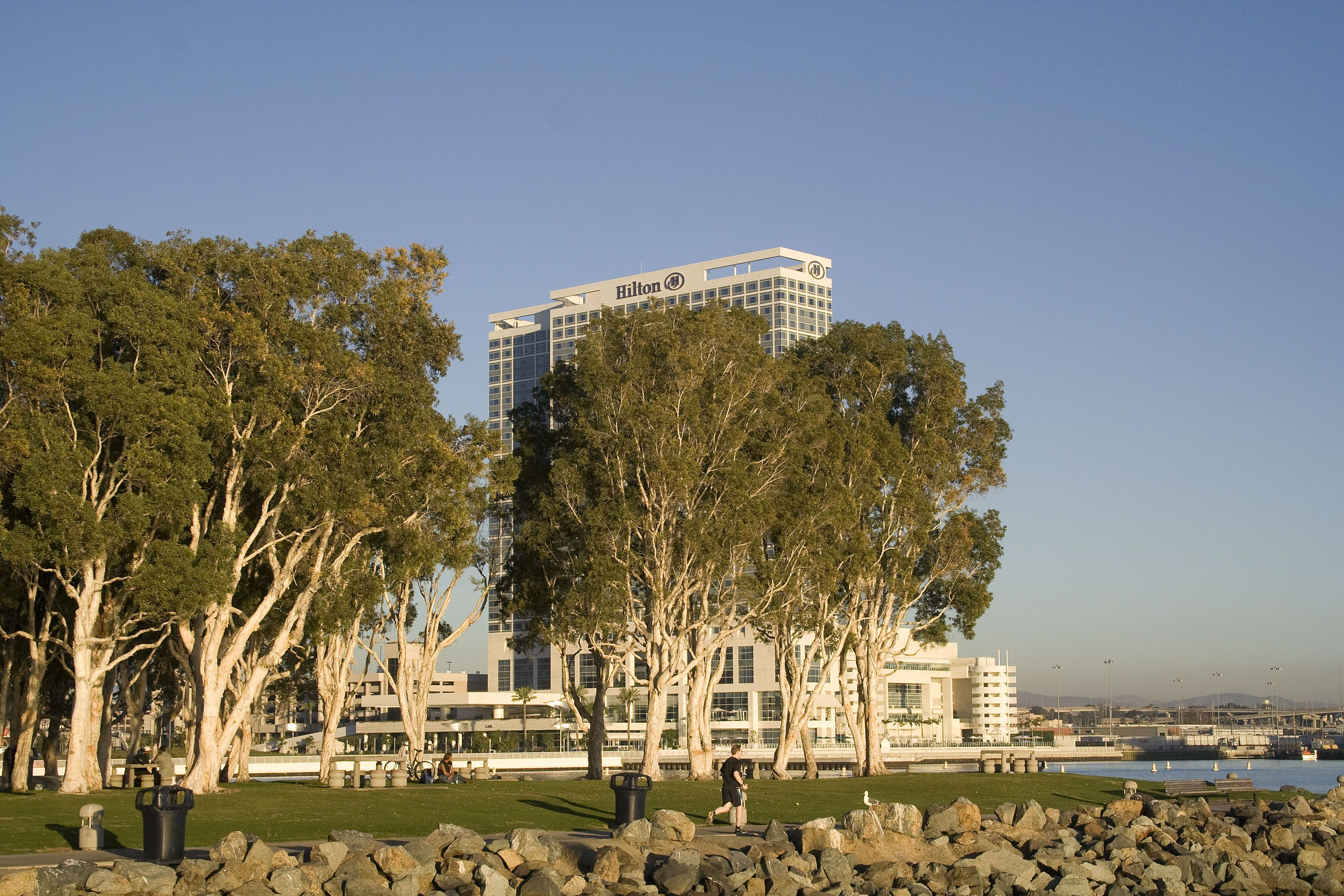
- The park in 2010

- Location within San Diego Location within California Location within the United States
- Type: Public
- Location: San Diego, California, U.S.
- Coordinates: 32°42′15″N 117°09′52″W
- Status: Open year round

Embarcadero Marina Park South is a park in San Diego, California. It is located near the San Diego Convention Center in the Marina district.

== See also ==
- Embarcadero Marina Park North
