= San Diego County Administration Center =

Government building in San Diego, California

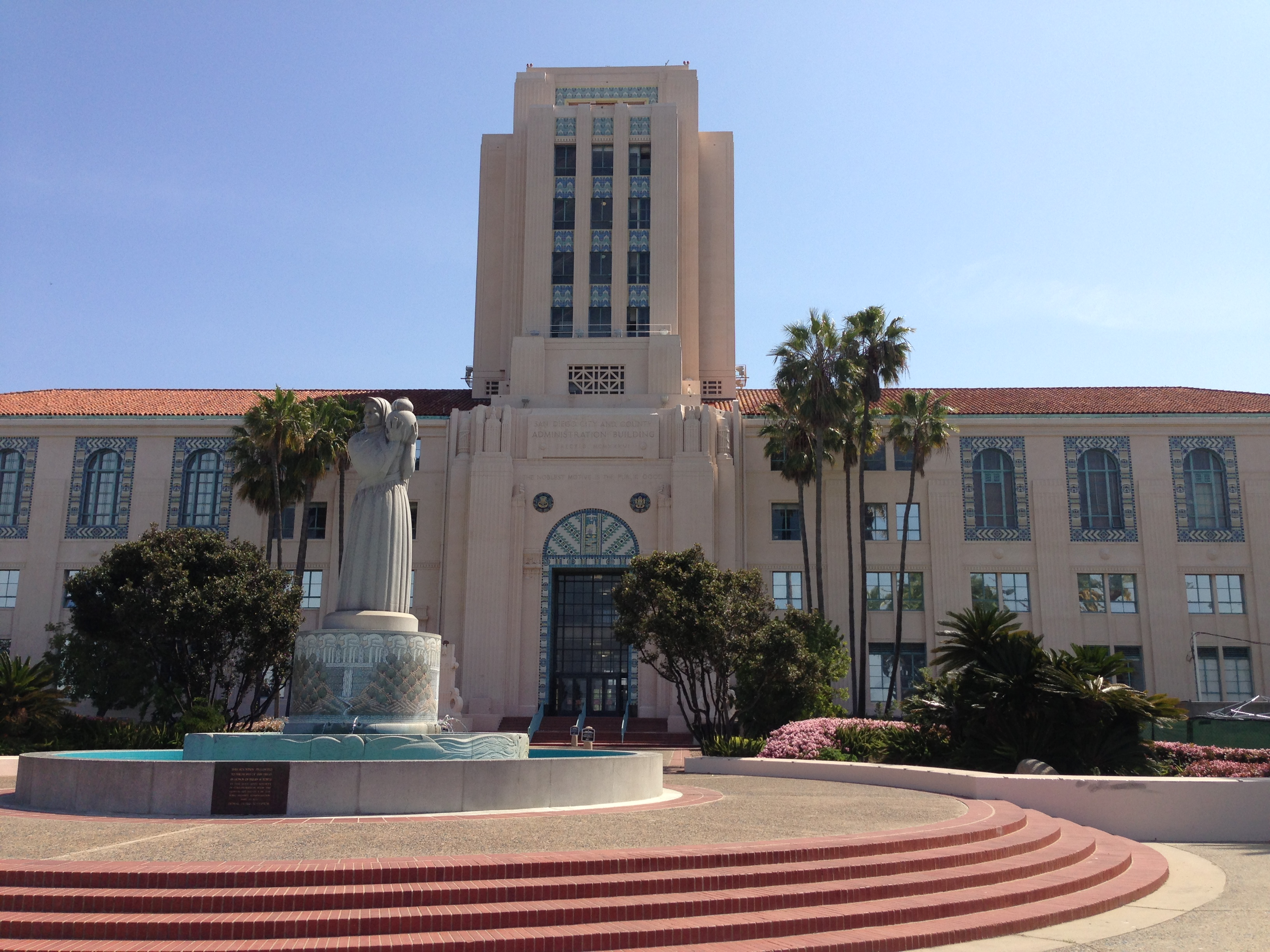
- The center with the statue Guardian of Water in the foreground

- Location within California Location within the United States
- Former names: San Diego Civic Center; City and County Administration Building

General information
- Architectural style: Beaux-Arts, Spanish Revival, Streamline Moderne, Mission Revival
- Location: 1600 Pacific Hwy., San Diego, California
- Coordinates: 32°43′19″N 117°10′20″W
- Groundbreaking: December 5, 1935
- Construction started: January 4, 1936
- Completed: December 23, 1938
- Inaugurated: July 16, 1938; 88 years ago

Height
- Height: 150 feet (46 m)

Technical details
- Floor count: 7 (incl. 2 basement floors)
- Floor area: 200,000 square feet (19,000 m^{2})

Design and construction
- Architects: Samuel Wood Hamill, William Templeton Johnson, Richard Requa, Louis John Gill

Website
- http://www.sdcounty.ca.gov/cob/cacs/
- San Diego Civic Center
- U.S. National Register of Historic Places
- U.S. Historic district
- Area: 16.7 acres (6.8 ha)
- NRHP reference No.: 88000554
- Added to NRHP: May 16, 1988

The San Diego County Administration Center is a historic Beaux-Arts/Spanish Revival–style building in San Diego, California. It houses the offices of the government of San Diego County. Due to its notable architecture and location fronting San Diego Bay, it is nicknamed the Jewel on the Bay.

It was completed in 1938 and was primarily funded by the Works Progress Administration. Architects were Samuel Wood Hamill, William Templeton Johnson, Richard Requa and Louis John Gill. The building used innovative construction techniques to guard against earthquakes, and the project was considered to be "a prototype of American civic center architecture". The building was listed on the National Register of Historic Places on May 16, 1988.

== History ==
In order to consolidate city and county government offices which were scattered across downtown San Diego, city planner John Nolen was engaged to plan a civic center. Voters rejected the first draft plan (1908) which would have placed the civic center downtown. In 1926 Nolen completed a plan which placed the civic center on newly dredged tidelands. This plan was approved in a March 1927 election. There was considerable opposition to building on the tidelands, in part because it was felt such a building would be unstable in an earthquake, but it was stabilized by 30-foot-long steel pilings driven in the ground and other measures. Some of the steel pilings were alternated in a manner designed to bear lateral stress; this was a novel design and was considered to be "on the cutting edge of engineering developments." Engineering issues and the Great Depression delayed the start of construction until 1935, when $1 million of Works Progress Administration funds were assigned to the project (combined with $750,000 of local funds). President Franklin Delano Roosevelt dedicated the building on July 16, 1938 before a crowd estimated as 25,000 people.

In 1964 the city moved its offices to a new downtown Community Concourse, and since then the building has held county offices only. Today many county offices are housed in a County Operations Center at 5500-5600 Overland Avenue, and the county maintains several branch offices to serve the public. The historic County Administration Center is still the home of the Board of Supervisors, the Chief Administrative Officer, the Assessor, the County Clerk, the Treasurer/Tax Collector, and many forms of public records.

In 2014 a waterfront park was opened on the former site of the building's parking lots.

== Architecture ==
The design was intended to complement structures in Balboa Park, a mix of Spanish Revival and Beaux-Arts architecture. Southwestern touches include "a red Mission tile roof, glazed Franciscan inlaid pottery tile, and arched door and window openings." The design of the central office tower included so-called P.W.A. Moderne. The structure also features the detail of Zigzag Moderne through the use of a large amount of ornamentation, "recessed windows in vertical patterns," and "smooth-surfaced columns." The county's art collection shown inside the building includes works by Charles Reiffel, Charles Fries, and a portrait of Franklin Delano Roosevelt by Donald Armand Luscomb.

== Artwork ==
A sculpture fountain, Guardian of Water (1939), by Donal Hord, stands on the harbor side of the building. Murals inside the building are by Arthur Ames and Jean Goodwin; they are painted with egg tempera, a popular water medium used in Italy in the 13th-15th centuries.

== Waterfront Park ==
In May 2014, the 12-acre (4.9 ha) County Administration Center Waterfront Park opened on both the north and south sides of the building, formerly surface parking lots. The Waterfront Park, more than a decade in the making, contains open grassy areas, gardens planted with drought-tolerant flowers on the north side, and picnic areas, a playground with colorful swings and slides, and an interactive water fountain on the south side.

== Gallery ==
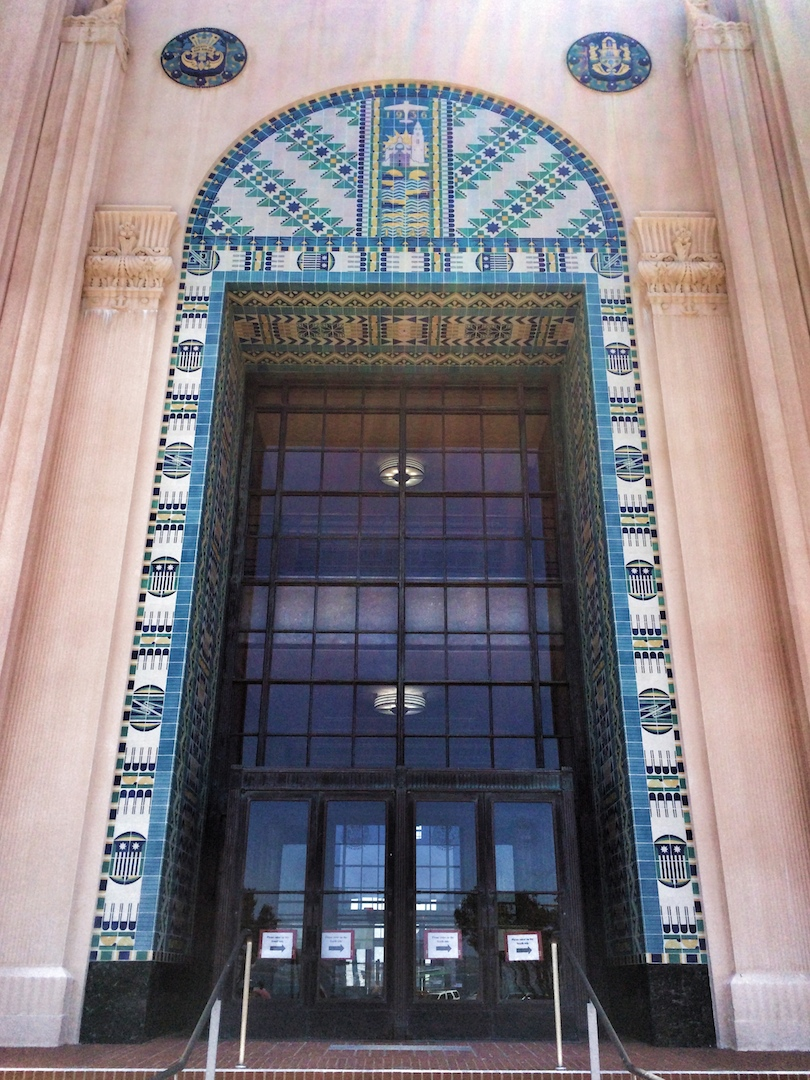
Detail of west entrance

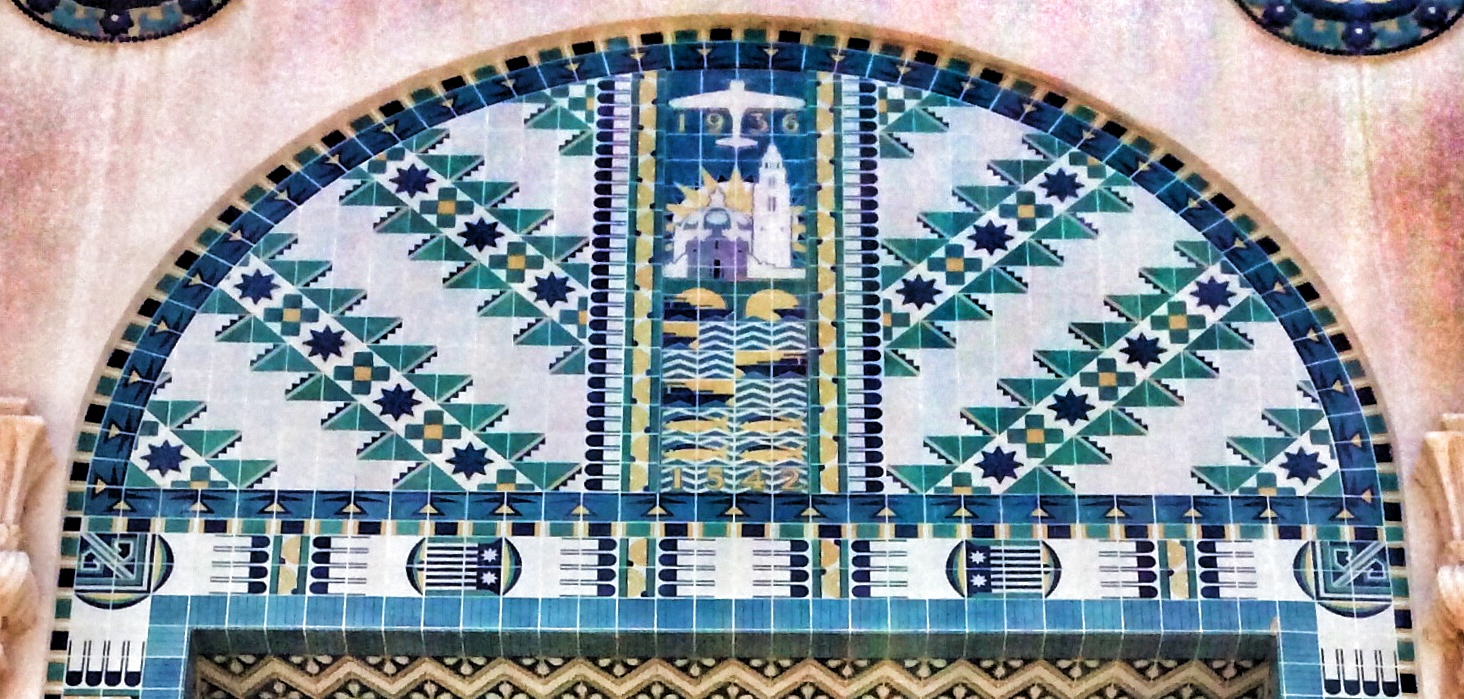
Closeup of headstone on mosaic, west entrance

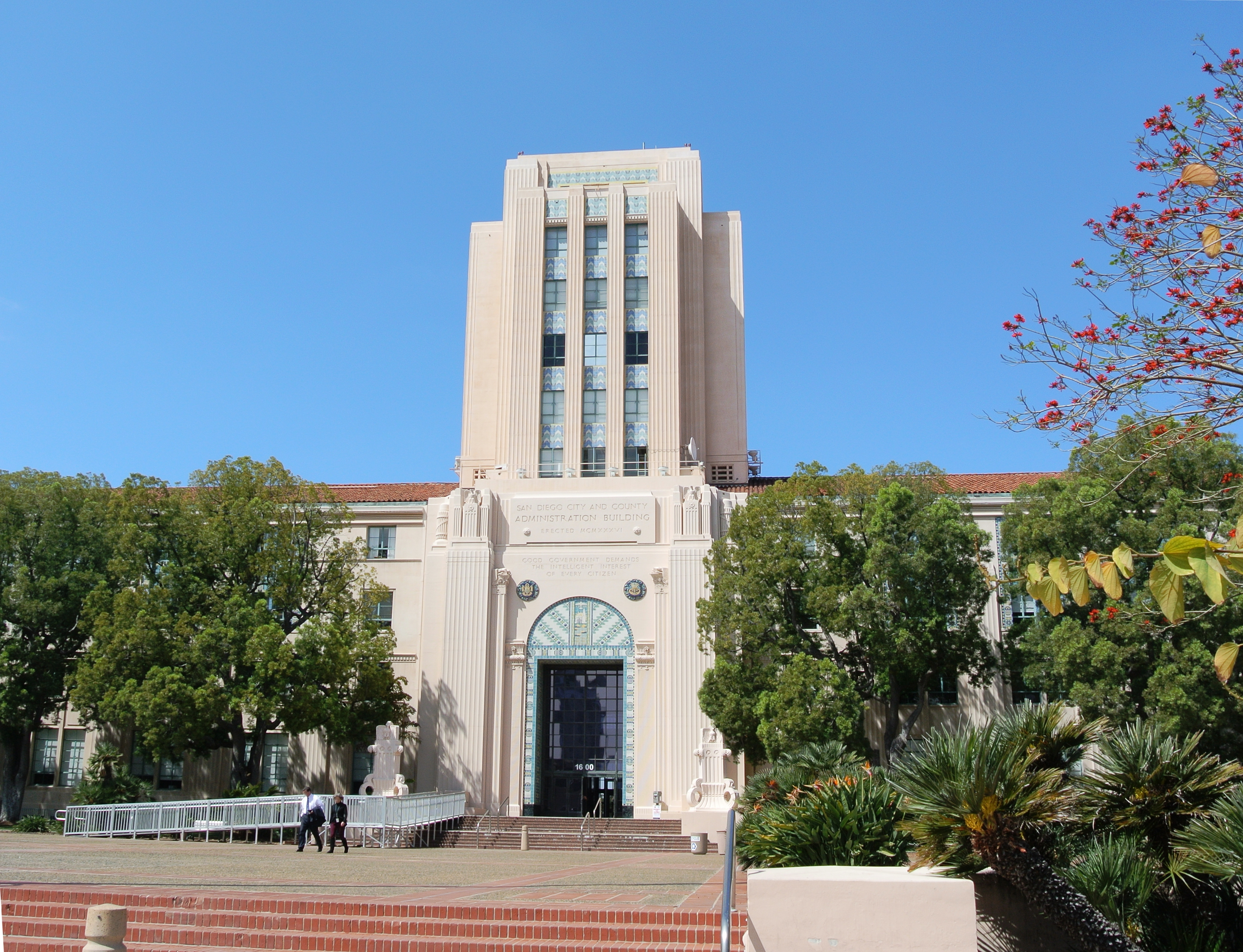
County Building, west facade

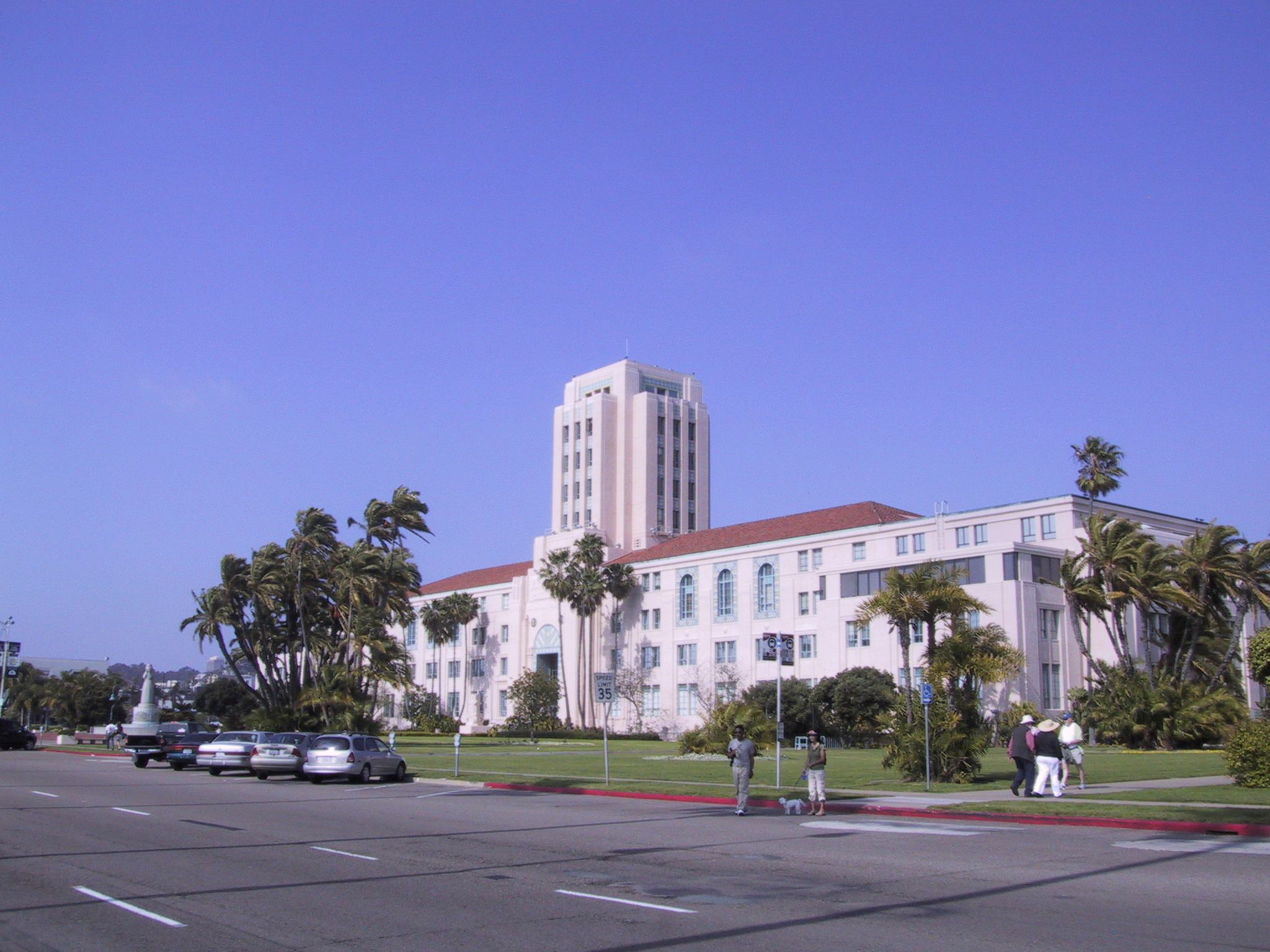
County Building, seen from across Harbor Drive

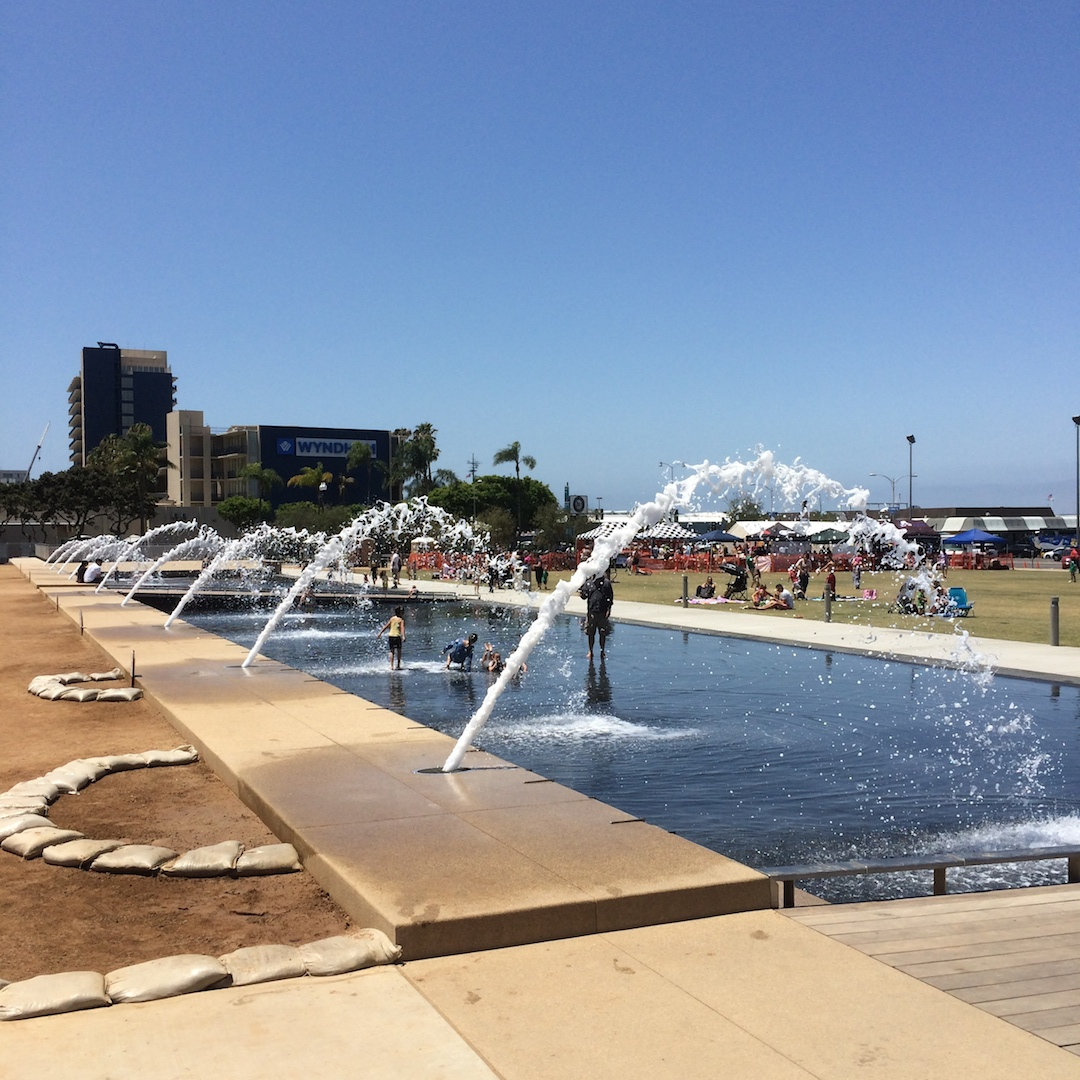
Fountains, Waterfront Park

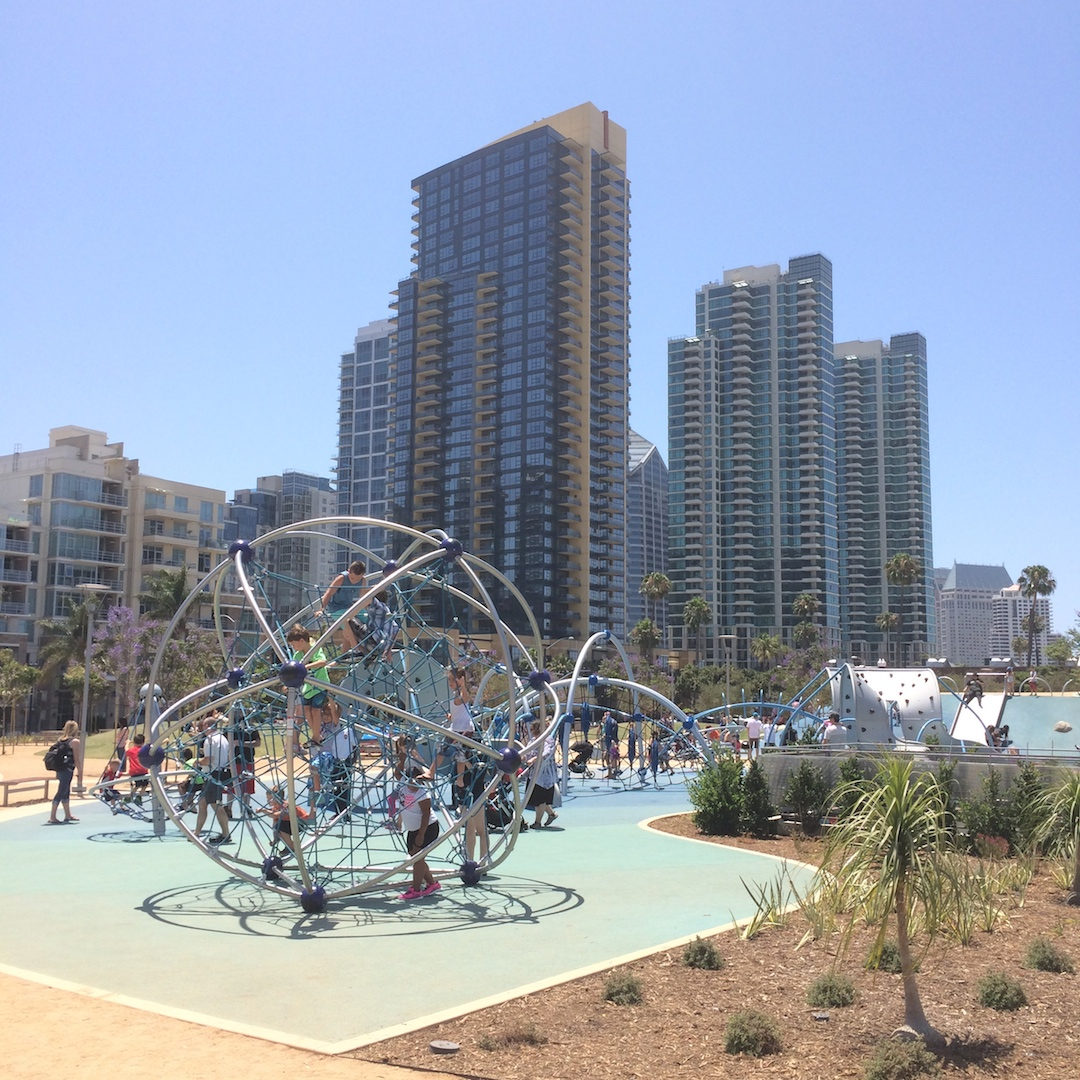
Playground, Waterfront Park

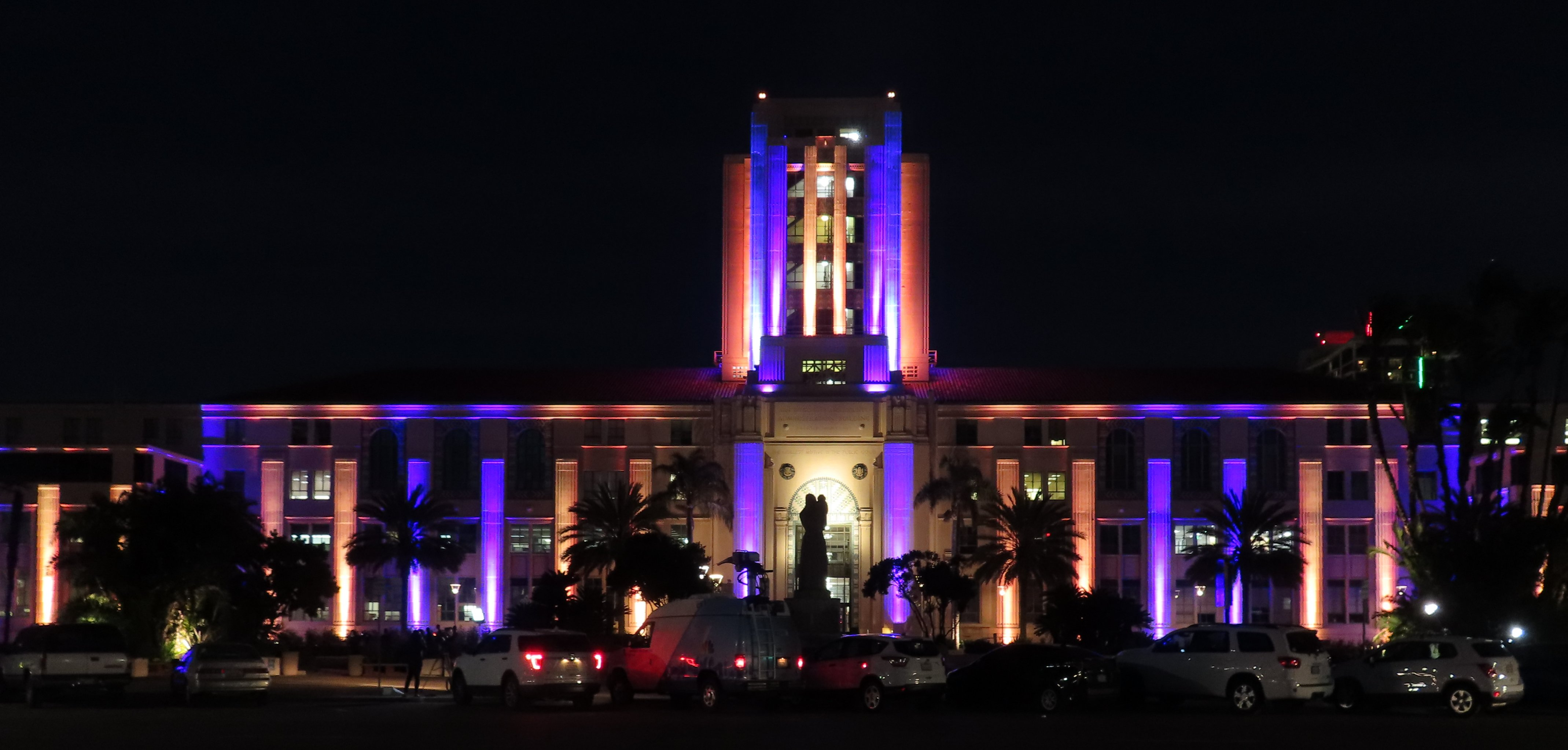
Building lit in Los Angeles Lakers colors shortly after the death of Kobe Bryant
