= Notan =

Principle of artistic composition

Nōtan (濃淡) is a design aesthetic referring to the use of light and shade while also implying a balance or harmony in their respective contrast. Its origins are said to lie in Asian art, best represented by the Taoist symbol of the yin and yang, although the concept itself is unique to art education in the United States and is generally described as an American idea. Nōtan, as it is used this way, refers to the relationship between positive and negative space, and in composition, the connection between shape and background. This use of dark and light translates shape and form into flat shapes on a two-dimensional surface. Art historian Ernest Fenollosa (1853–1908) is credited with introducing nōtan to the United States in the waning years of the fin de siècle. It was subsequently popularized by Arthur Wesley Dow in his book Composition (1899).

== Etymology ==
Initially, the word is built with two kanjis. The first kanji is 濃 (のう, nō in On reading), which translate to dark, concentrated, thick. This kanji is used in combination to describe colour (濃い, こい, koi: dark, black), like in 濃紺 (のうこん, nōkon: dark blue); consistency (濃度, のうど, nōdo: concentrated, thick ) like in 濃口醤油 (こいくちしょうゆ, koikuchishou: dark soy sauce). The second kanji 淡 (タン, tan, in On reading) translates as thin, pale, fleeting, weak.

Originally, in Japanese, Nōtan (濃淡) translates to depth of flavour, complexity, light and shade or strength and weakness. It will be used mostly to describe the depth of flavour or richness of a dish, or less often to describe the contrast in a visual piece of art. 濃淡をつける (nōtan o tsukeru) means to add contrast. It will be used for example to better a speech by adding strength to the strong points and making the soft parts even softer. It can be used as well in painting, by making the light colours even lighter and the dark colours darker. Overall, nōtan o tsukeru means to emphasize the nuances and make them less subtle.

== In art education in the United States ==
Its usage originates with art historian Ernest Fenollosa (1853–1908), who is credited with introducing the idea to the United States in the waning years of the fin de siècle. It was subsequently popularized by Arthur Wesley Dow in an 1893 article and later expanded in his book Composition: Understanding Line, Notan and Color (1899).

Contrary to what Dow affirms in his book, the word nōtan is rarely used in the Japanese language in aesthetics studies, but is mostly used in reference to flavours. In his book, Dow assimilates the concept of nōtan to the aesthetic quality of a well-balanced painting.

This use of light and dark translates shape and form into flat shapes on a two-dimensional surface. Nōtan is traditionally presented in paint, ink, or cut paper, but it is relevant to a host of modern-day image-making techniques, such as lithography in printmaking, and rotoscoping in animation.

=== In practice ===
Dow gives several exercises for art students and teachers to practice for example:

- Use only a charcoal on paper to render a painting only in black and white
- Use a Japanese calligraphy brush to draw, instead of pencils
- Analyse a painting only based on its lines, and not on its content or colours

In contemporary art education, nōtan now refers as a practice of rough sketching, using a paintbrush, to catch the main elements of a scene. The practice of nōtan is different than that of shading. Shading aims to represent the dimensionality of an object, while nōtan represents its placement in space.

== In photography ==
=== n-values nōtan ===
The first approach to nōtan is via 2-value nōtan which is a black and white sketch. It is done by assembling light tones under the white color, and dark tones under the black color. Nōtan, being an approach of structure, could technically be done with any two light and dark colors as long as they have sufficient contrast with each other.

3-values nōtan introduces a grey that is a 50/50 mix of the white and the black. Some other acceptations of 2+ values nōtan can be white, black, and other tones, not necessarily grey.

In theory, nōtan can go up to an infinite number of grey values, rejoining then the concept of greyscale.

=== In Photoshop ===
It is possible to create a nōtan of an image in Photoshop, by simplifying the textures and colors. The way to do it is by merging all layers, simplifying textures with Gaussian blur, and then adjust for two tones in Image > Adjust > Threshold.
