= Donal Hord =

American sculptor (1902–1966)

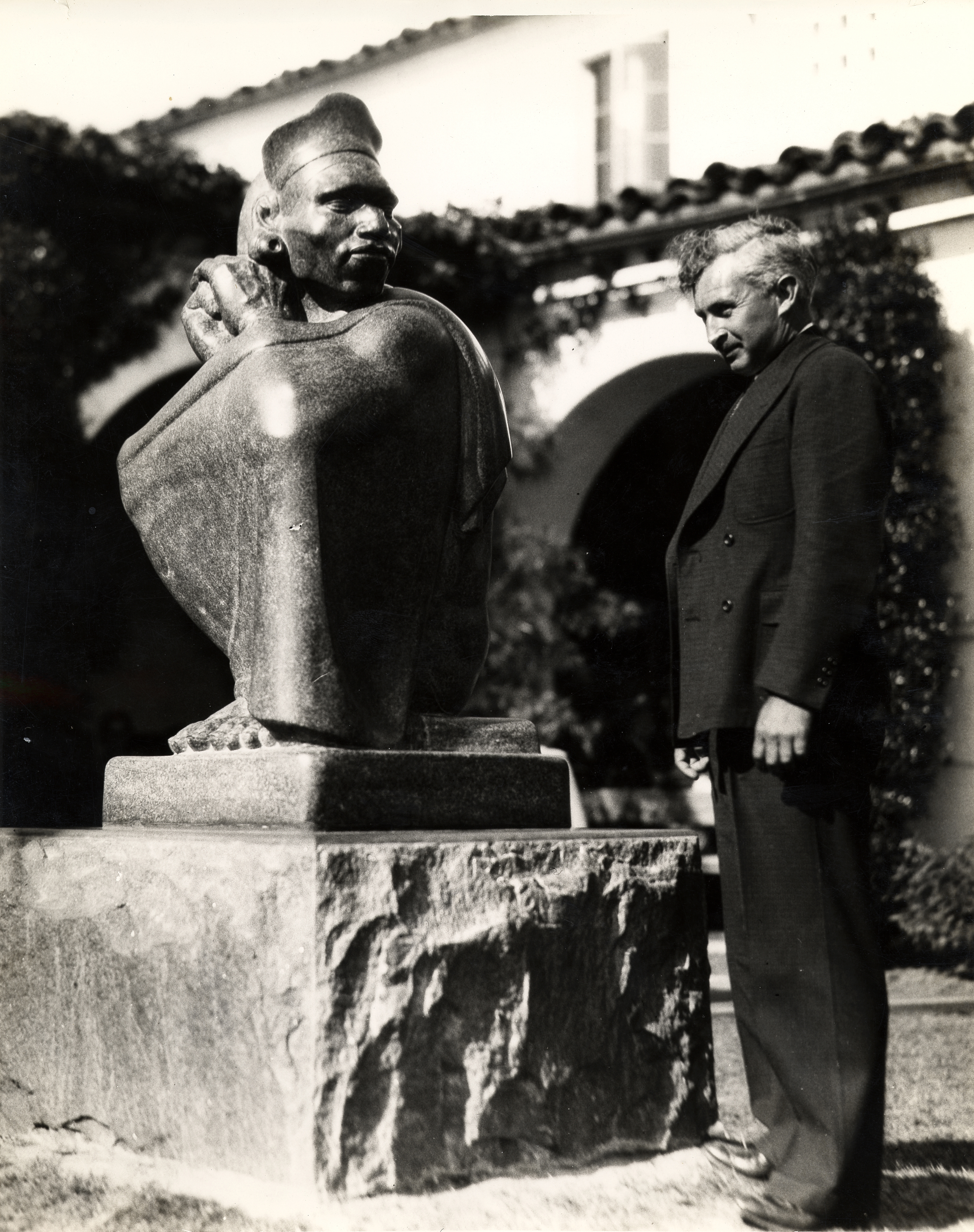
- Donal Hord with Aztec (1937), campus of San Diego State University, created as part of the Federal Art Project
- Born: Donald Albert Horr; February 26, 1902; Prentice, Wisconsin, U.S.
- Died: June 29, 1966 (aged 64); San Diego, California, U.S.
- Resting place: Greenwood Memorial Park, San Diego, California, U.S.
- Education: Santa Barbara School of Art; Pennsylvania Academy of the Fine Arts
- Spouse(s): Dorr Bothwell (m. 1932–1934) Florence Dorothy Silberhorn (m. 1939)
- Awards: Guggenheim Fellowship (1945, 1947)

Donal Albert Hord (né Donald Albert Horr; February 26, 1902 – June 29, 1966), an American sculptor in San Diego, California. He is known for his large scale works in stone and wood created through the Federal Art Project.

== Early life ==
Donal Hord was born as Donald Albert Horr on February 26, 1902, in Prentice, Wisconsin. His parents divorced when he was a child.

In 1914, Hord and his mother moved west, to Seattle, Washington. Shortly thereafter he contracted rheumatic fever, a condition that affected his heart and led to health conditions that were to be a factor in his life from then on. It was while he was ill in Seattle that Hord, spending much of his time in bed reading, developed an interest in Mexico and the people of Mexico that became powerful influence on his life and art. Believing that he could not survive another winter in damp Seattle, in 1916 his mother relocated them one more time, this time moving to the warmer, drier climate of San Diego, California, where they were both to remain for the remainders of their lives.

Hord’s interest in sculpture had begun in Seattle. An early work there by the then 13-year-old was a stone sphinx, carved into the sandstone cliffs overlooking Puget Sound. (This piece, though carved into living rock may have been subsequently removed, for its whereabouts are listed as "missing" in the various inventories of Hord’s work.) After moving to San Diego, Hord began the serious study of art. He arrived in 1916, the year that the Panama–California Exposition had taken over Balboa Park, and where Hord was exposed to the architecture of Bertram Goodhue, the sculpture of the Piccirilli Brothers and the cultural, ethnographic and botanical exhibits that helped make up exposition.

Because of his poor health Hord was primarily homeschooled, which led to his developing a very personal relationship with the San Diego Public Library and its attendant librarians. Later in his career he was to produce two large relief panels for the San Diego Public Library's then-new Central Library building, panels that alluded to several of his interests, notably reading and Asian art. The latter interest developed early in his life. As a teenager Hord had begun collecting Asian and Mexican art pieces.

== Education ==
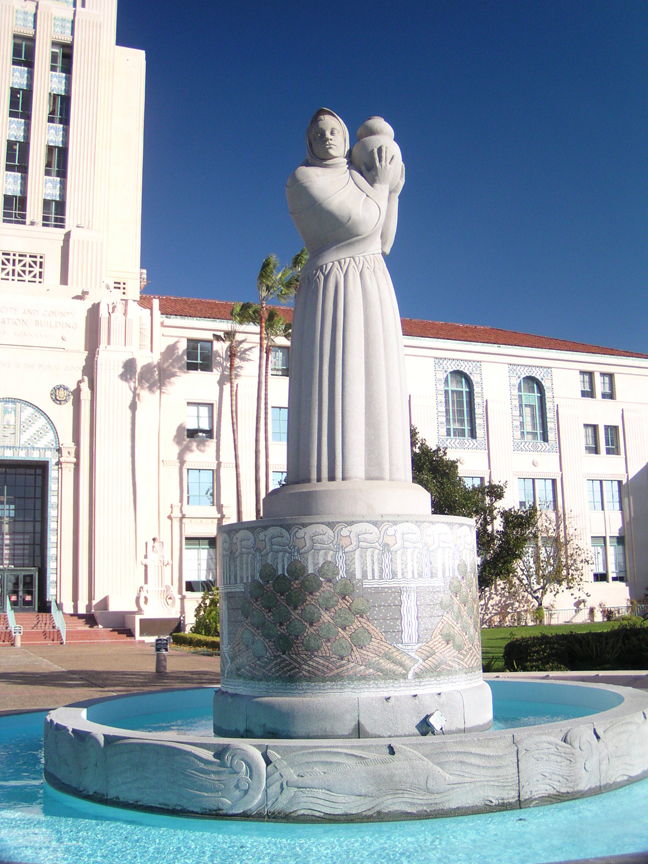
Guardian of Water, 1939, San Diego

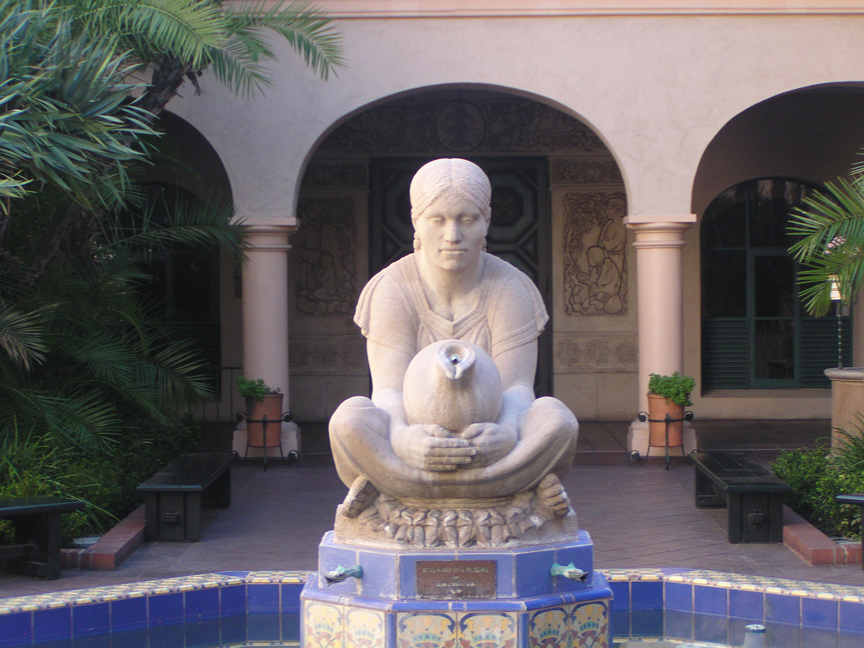
Woman of Tehuantepec, 1935, Balboa Park, San Diego

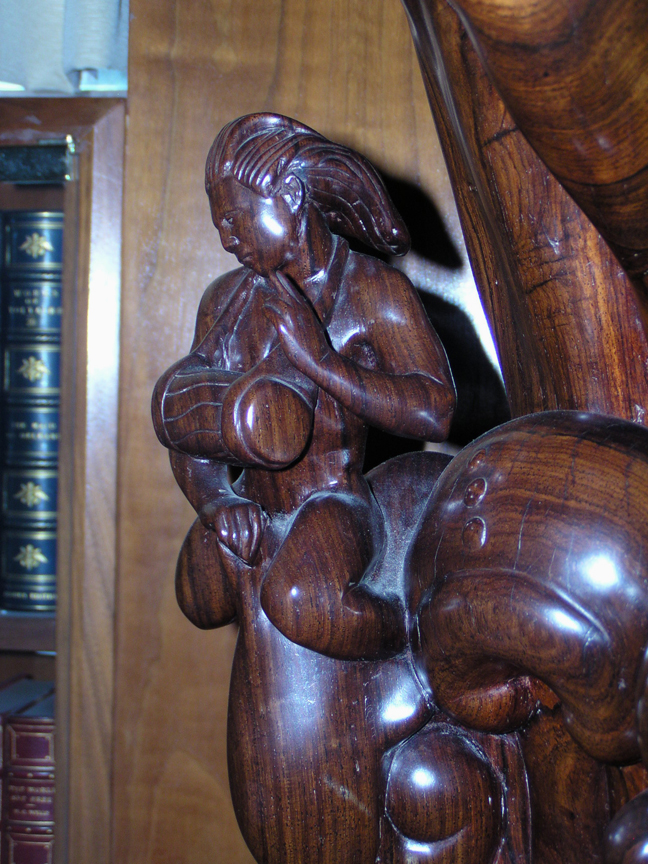
Detail from Westwind, 1953, Wangenheim Room, San Diego Public Library's Central Library

1917 found Hord enrolling in art night classes at San Diego High School, under the tutelage of Anna Valentien, a sculptor and potter who had at one point studied in Paris with Auguste Rodin. It was while attending these classes that Hord met Dorr Bothwell, whom he briefly married. She was a respected visual artist in her own right.

In 1920, Hord met an ex-US Navy sailor named Homer Dana became Hord’s assistant, model and companion for the rest of his life. Dana's ability to handle the larger, heavier aspects of sculpture allowed Hord to produce larger works than his physical limitations would have otherwise allowed. It fell to Dana to finish Hord’s last piece that was uncompleted at the time of Hord’s death.

Seeking more art education than could be found in San Diego, Hord, in 1926, began taking classes at the Santa Barbara School of Art. There he studied with the Scottish sculptor, Archibald Dawson. From this meeting arose one of the two bits of criticism that were to greatly influence Hord’s outlook. At one point Hord showed Dawson what he considered to be a completed work, prompting Dawson to respond with something like, "Very nice, now finish it." The other words were to come from Mexican muralist, Diego Rivera, who upon seeing a few of Hord’s works, commented that they were, "pretty toys." These remarks instilled Hord with a desire to only produce the finest quality pieces and led directly to what was to become one of the defining characteristics of his work, the fine degree of finish that he applied to them.

He briefly attended classes at the Pennsylvania Academy of the Fine Arts.

== Career ==
In 1934 Hord applied to, and was accepted into, the Federal Art Project. This project, through which the Federal Government paid artists a regular salary ($75 a month, in Hord’s case), to produce works that were placed in schools, post offices and other public places. An early contribution by Hord to the program was the stone fountain, Tehuana for Balboa Park’s Hospitality House. The ensuing years were to see the creation of some of Hord’s best-known and most endeared pieces, including the monumental Guardian of Water (1939), which still stands in front of the San Diego County Administration Building, Aztec, located at San Diego State University, and seven limestone panels, Legend of California, for Coronado High School. In 1943 he was elected into the National Academy of Design as an Associate member and became a full Academician in 1951.

The years following the end of the Second World War found Hord at the height of his artistic prowess, producing not only many fine smaller works, but also, with the aid of Homer Dana, several large architectural works, notably two large concrete bas-reliefs for the San Diego Public Library's Central Library. In 1956 his work, Angel of Peace was unveiled at the American Cemetery in Henri-Chapelle, Belgium, a commission from the American Battle Monuments Commission that he inherited from Carl Milles who died before he was able to produce it.

Hord was awarded the Guggenheim Fellowship in sculpture in 1945 and 1947. Hord was one of 250 sculptors who exhibited in the 3rd Sculpture International held at the Philadelphia Museum of Art in the summer of 1949.

== Style ==
One of the characteristics that makes Hord’s work unique was his choice of the materials from which he created them. Besides the standard bronze, limestone, granite, cast stone, terra cotta, and the marbles used by other artists, Hord’s works appeared in various tropical woods such as mahogany, eucalyptus, ebony, lignum vitae, and rosewood, and in minerals such as obsidian, diorite, onyx and nephrite. His jade piece, Thunder, at 104 pounds, was reckoned to be the largest jade sculpture ever produced. What most of these materials have in common is that they are very hard and difficult to work. Beginning in the 1920s Hord was a part of the "direct carving" school of sculpture, meaning that rather than carving from a previously produced model, Hord allowed his work to be influenced by the grain of the material that he was carving.

== Death and legacy ==
On June 29, 1966, Hord died in Mercy Hospital in San Diego, mere weeks after suffering from a heart attack. He was survived by his wife Florence.

Hord bequeathed to the San Diego Public Library his lifelong collection of books and several sculptures in appreciation for the assistance he had received from library's staff over the years. His final commission, Summer Rain was posthumously cast by Homer Dana two years after Hord’s death.

== Public works ==
- Burden of Earth (1931), Yokohama, Japan
- CCC Workers (1934), South Pasadena Jr. High School, South Pasadena, California
- Woman of Tehuantepec (1935), Balboa Park, San Diego, California
- Aztec (1937), San Diego State University, San Diego, California
- Men Working on a Road (1937), Santa Monica High School, Santa Monica, California
- Mexican Mother and Child (1938), Roosevelt Memorial Museum, Hyde Park, New York
- Guardian of Water (1939), in front of the San Diego County Administration Center, San Diego, California
- Legend of California (1939), Coronado High School, Coronado, California
- Girl Reading (1940), Herbert Hoover High School, San Diego, California
- Panels (1941), Kit Carson Elementary School, San Diego, California
- Spring Stirring (1948), Scripps Institution of Oceanography, San Diego, California
- Peon Game Guessers and Peon Game Passers (1950), San Diego Public Library's Central Library, San Diego, California
- Literature West and Literature East (1953), San Diego Public Library's Central Library, San Diego, California
- Westwind (1953), San Diego Public Library's Central Library, San Diego, California
- Young Bather (1955), San Diego Public Library's La Jolla/Riford Branch, San Diego, California
- Justice (1956) Los Angeles County Courthouse, Los Angeles, California
- Angel Of Peace (1958), American Cemetery in Henri-Chapelle, Welkenraedt, Wallonia, Belgium
- Award of Swedish Swimming Federation (1964), Swimming Hall of Fame, Ft. Lauderdale, Florida
