= Yamate =

Yamate 山手
- District
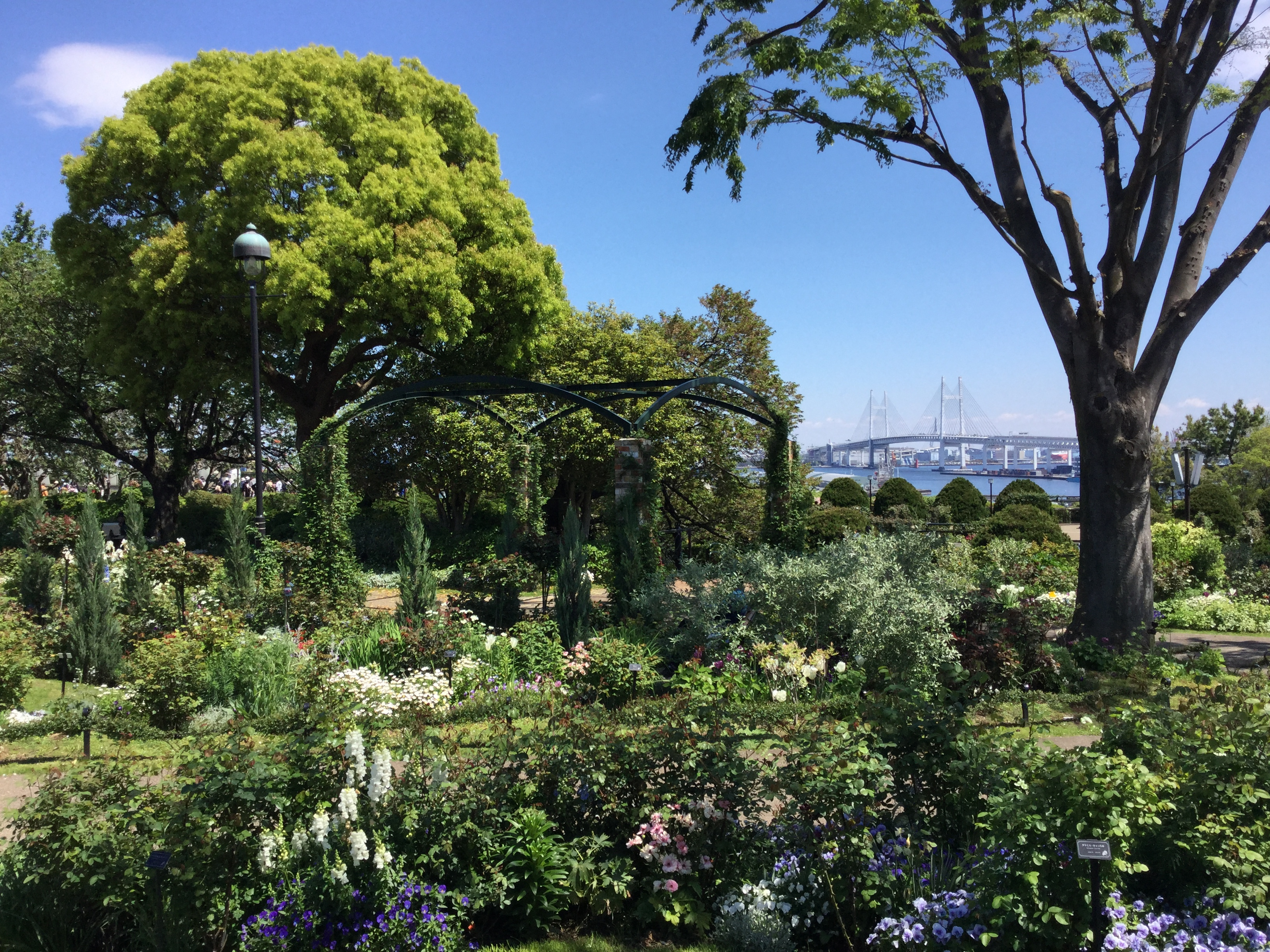
- View from Harbour View Park, Yamate towards the Yokohama Bay Bridge
- Nickname: The Bluff
- Interactive map of Yamate
- Coordinates: 35.4381994°N 139.6535468°E
- Country: Japan
- City: Yokohama
- Ward: Naka-ku
- Area: Yamate
- Time zone: UTC+9 (JST)

Yamate (山手) is the name of a historic neighbourhood in Naka-ku, Yokohama often referred to in English as The Bluff. The neighbourhood is famous as having been a foreigners' residential area in the Bakumatsu, Meiji and Taishō periods. While still dominantly residential in character, with views over downtown Yokohama, historic residential properties, ornamental gardens and public parks, the area is also a popular visitor destination.

== History ==
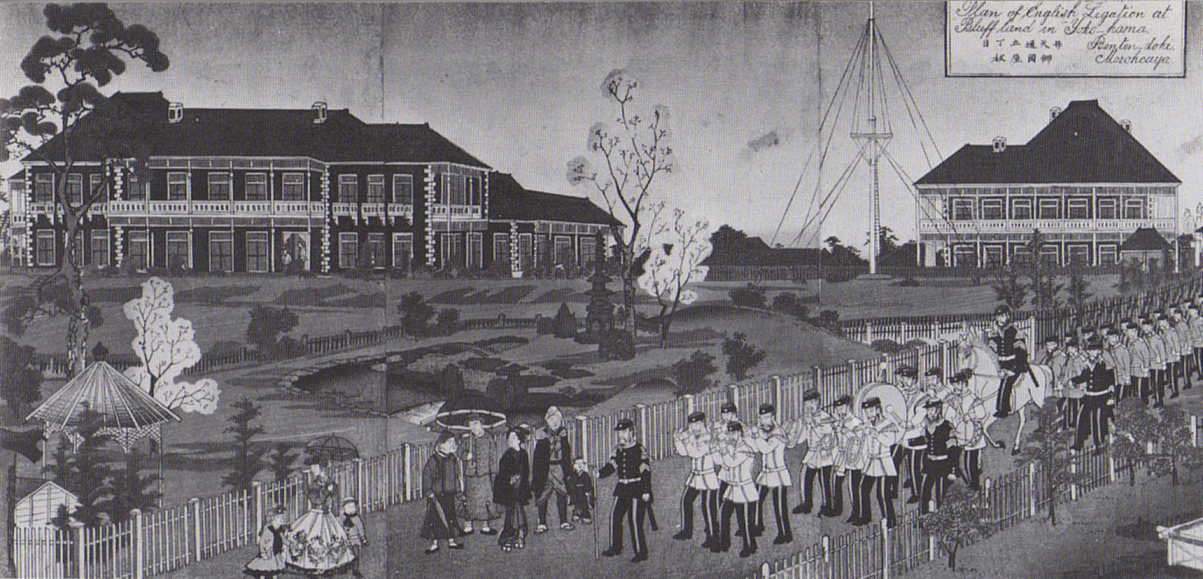
British Consul's Residence, Yamate (1867) Depicted by Hiroshige II

When the Port of Yokohama first opened to foreign trade under the terms of the Treaty of Amity and Commerce in 1859, the foreigner's settlement was initially confined to a low-lying area known as Kannai. As commercial activity in the Kannai settlement rapidly outgrew the available space, construction on the elevated Yamate Bluff started in 1862. Initially a residential area for the foreign diplomatic community, one of the first structures to be built on the Bluff was the residence of the British Consul-General, Sir Rutherford Alcock.

=== British Military Garrison ===
From 1862 until 1875, British diplomatic and commercial interests were protected by a troop garrison stationed at Yamate at the crest of the hill overlooking the harbour, a location that now serves as Harbour View Park. After a series of attacks on the British legation at Yedo a military guard for British diplomats stationed at Yokohama was first established in 1860. In 1861 this small detachment was supplemented by Royal Marines from HMS Renard. Much larger numbers of troops of the 20th (East Devonshire) Regiment of the Foot arrived on troopship HMS Vulcan in January 1864, together with two companies of the 2nd Baloochees from the Bombay Native Infantry. A Royal Marine battalion arrived on 25 May 1864, aboard HMS Conqueror, bringing garrison troop numbers in that year to 1,700. In subsequent years these units were replaced by members of the 9th (East Norfolk),11th, 67th and the 10th (North Lincoln) Regiment of Foot.

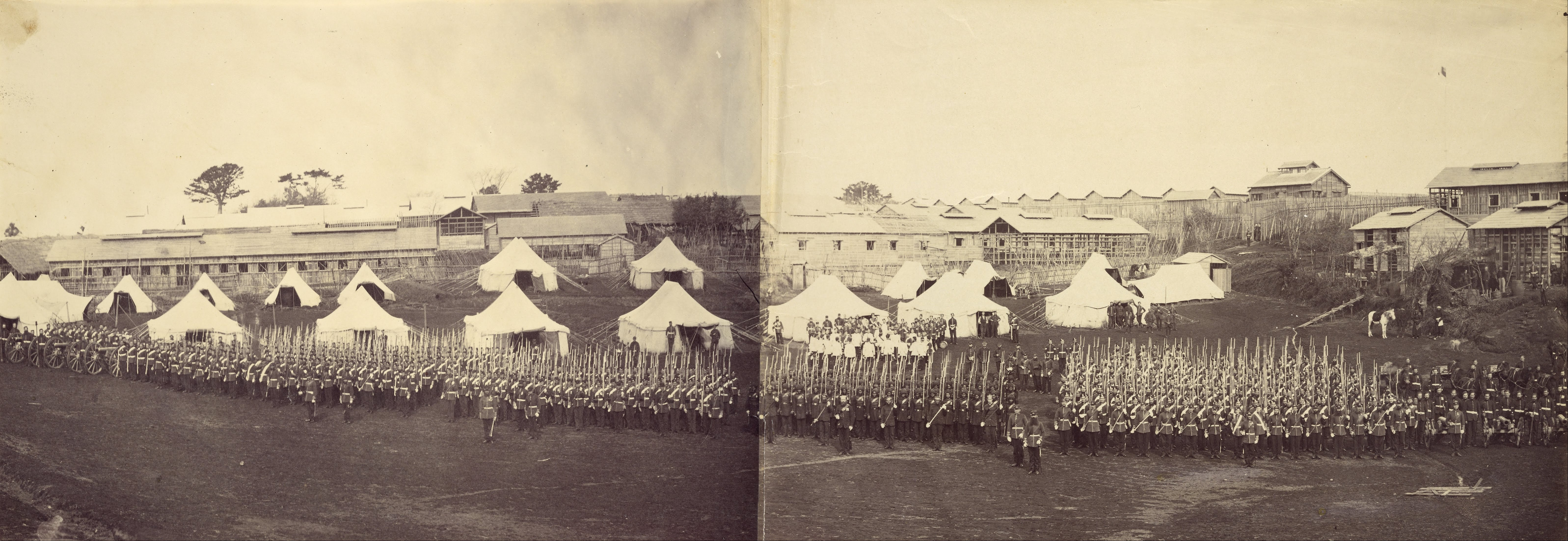
British Military Garrison, Parade Ground, Yamate (c.1864) photographed by Felice Beato

Contemporary maps produced in 1864 indicate that officer and troop accommodation, a naval hospital, stores facilities and a large parade ground stretched from the modern park area overlooking the harbour as far as the current location of Christ Church, Yokohama. Team sports, notably cricket and rugby union, were introduced to Japan for the first time on the parade ground by British service personnel.

Conditions in the camp varied greatly; while the wooden huts of the 20th regiment afforded greater protection from the vagaries of the weather, bell tents assigned to the Marine Battalion provided little protection against the torrential rain and humidity of the Yokohama summer. Detailed Royal Navy medical records of the period reported frequent smallpox outbreaks among the troops and that a dysentery epidemic shortly after the arrival of the Marine Battalion in the summer of 1864 claimed the lives of 11 men.

During the same period the French diplomatic mission also had a smaller detachment of troops located at a site adjacent to its own consular property. A French military hospital was also established at the foot of the Yamate hill.

== Historic Residential Properties ==
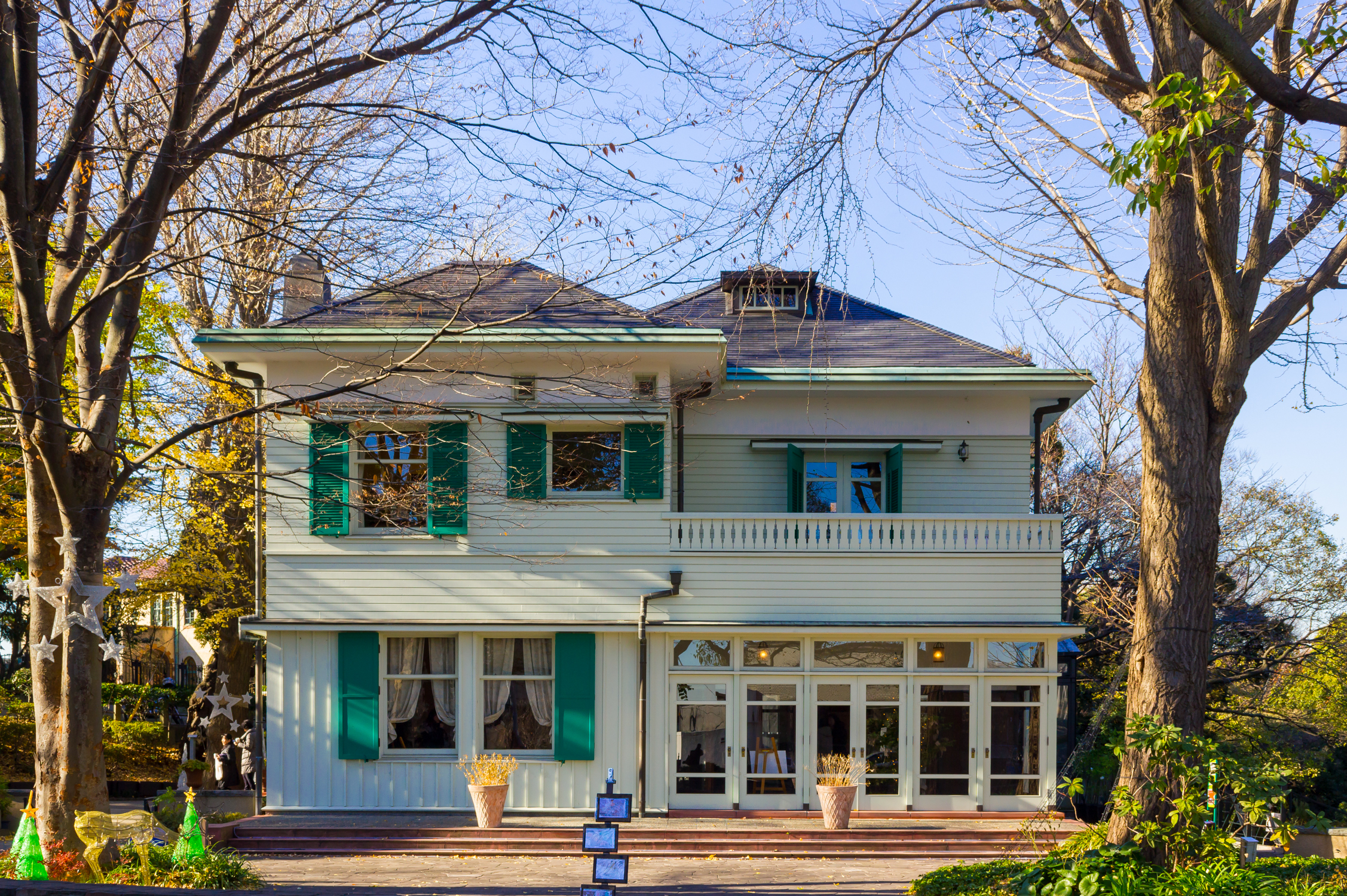
Ehrisman Residence (1927)

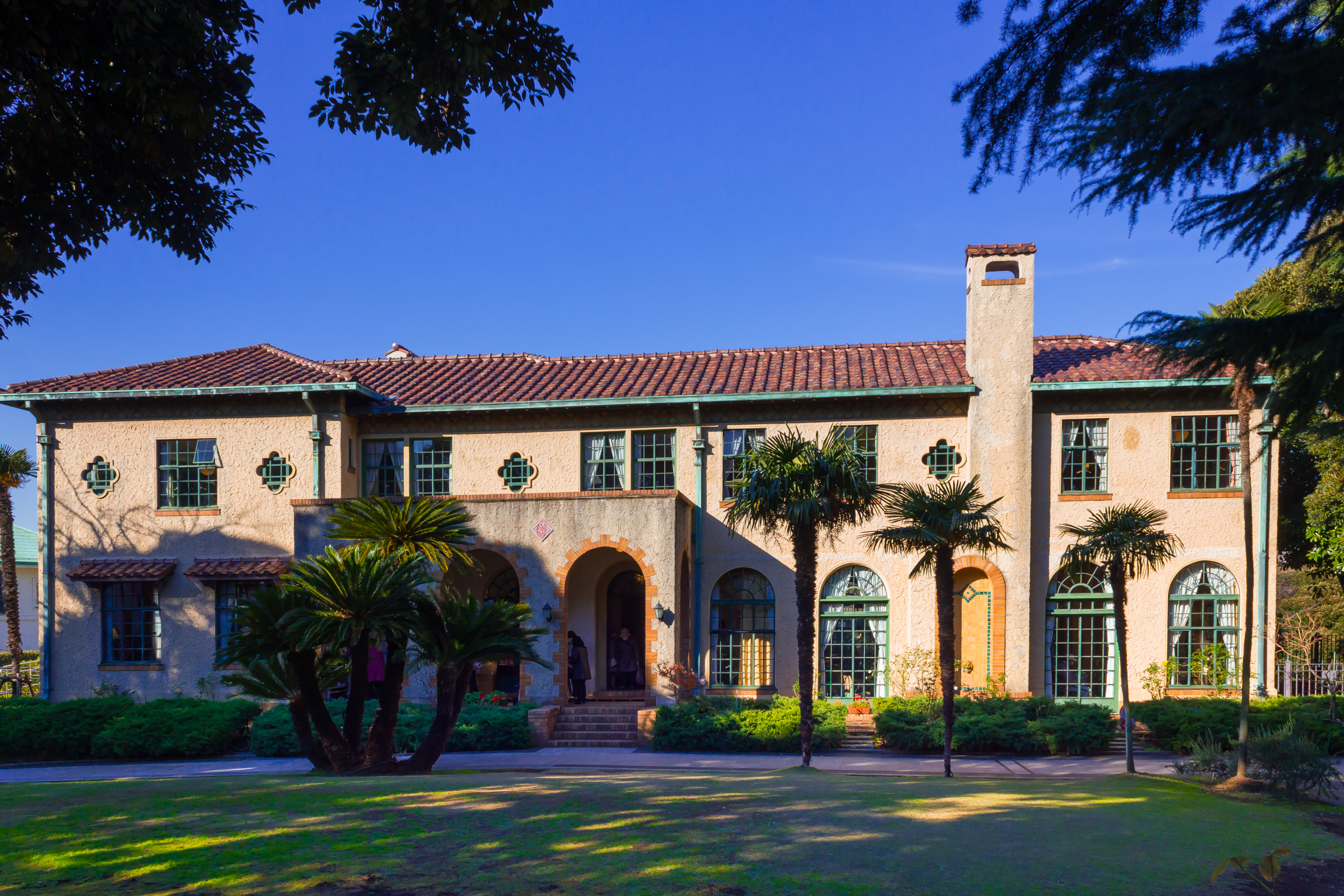
Berrick Hall (1930)

Over succeeding years during the Meiji era, many senior officers of the Kannai trading companies, oyatoi gaikokujin and the diplomatic representatives of other trading nations established homes in the neighbourhood.

Although many of the original foreign resident's accommodation and civic buildings were destroyed in the Great Kantō earthquake, a number of older Meiji and Taishō Period properties have been preserved and relocated to this neighbourhood. The buildings and their ornamental gardens are open to the public free of charge and serve as popular tourist attractions, many featuring tea rooms, art and seasonal ikebana exhibits. Current properties from the Meiji, Taishō and early Showa periods open to visitors include:

- Diplomat's House (1910) designed for Japanese Ambassador Sadatsuchi Uchida by James McDonald Gardiner. Located adjacent to the Bluff 18 House in the Italian Garden Park.
- The Ehrismann Residence (1927) designed by Antonin Raymond
- Berrick Hall (1930) designed by Jay H. Morgan as the residence of a British trading merchant.
- Former British Consul's Residence (1937) located in Harbour View Park
- Yamate 111 House designed by Jay H. Morgan and the Yamate 234 house.

== Sightseeing and local landmarks ==
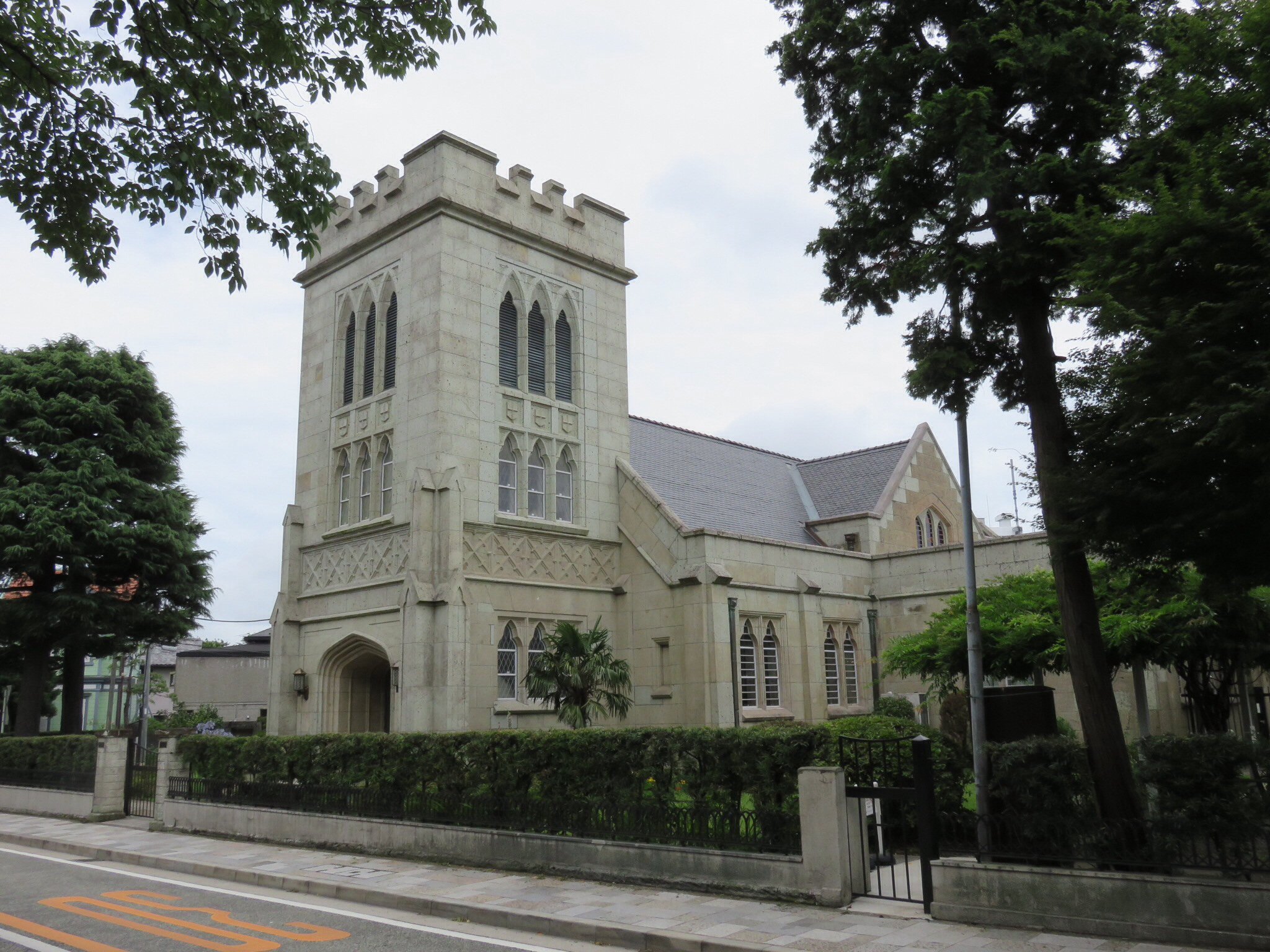
Christ Church, Yokohama

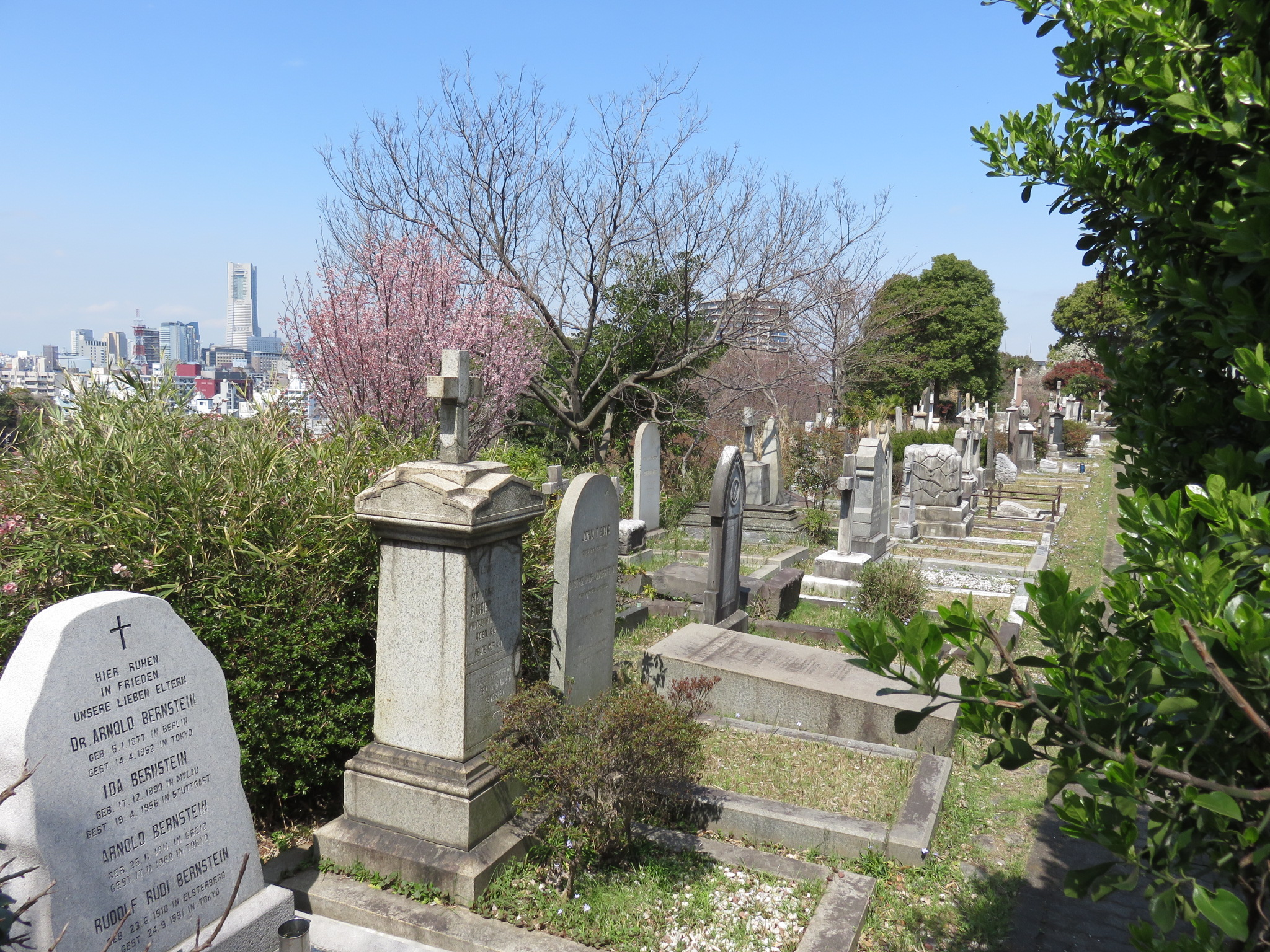
Yokohama Foreign General Cemetery

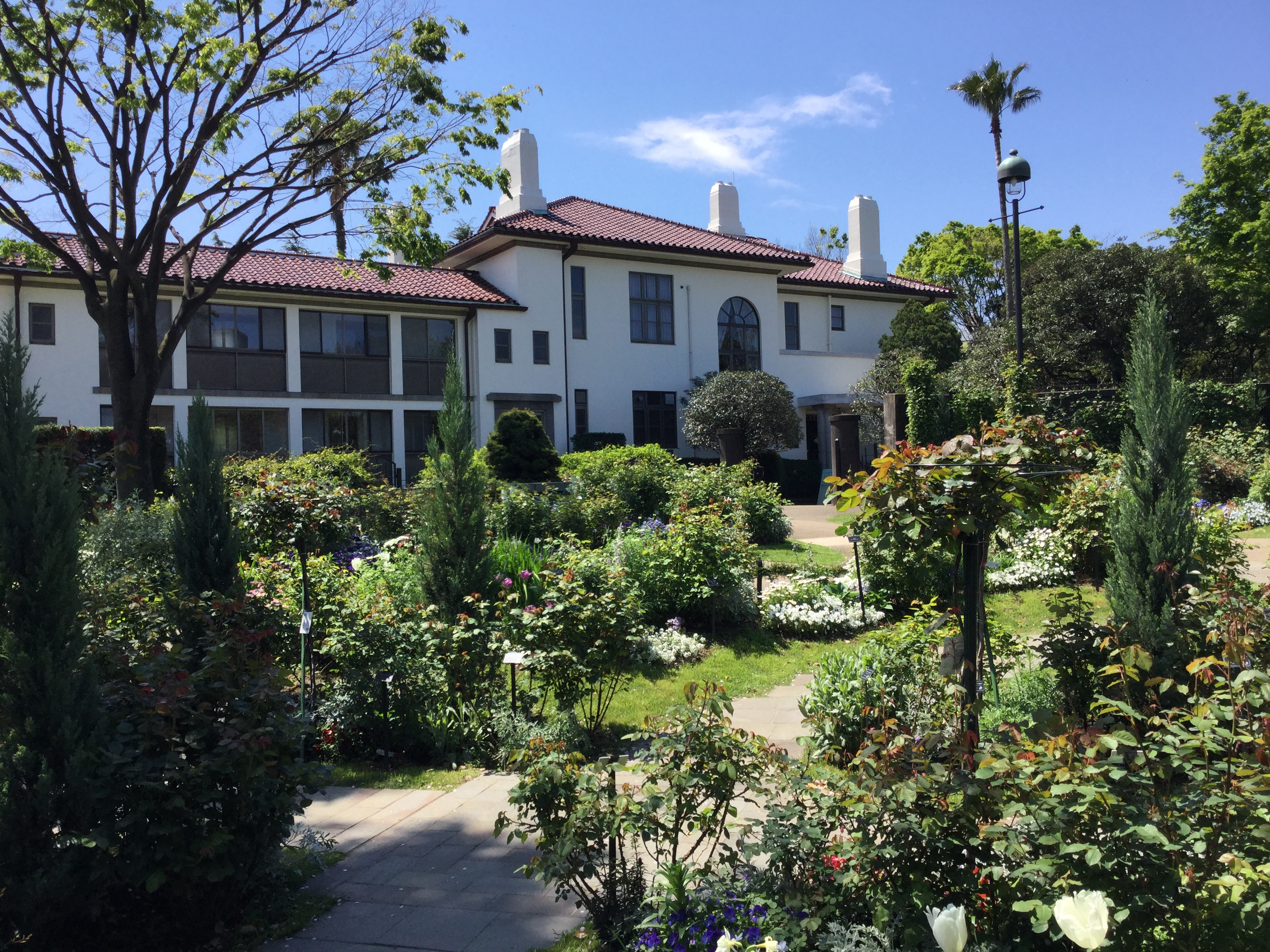
Former British Consul's Residence (1937)

The area features the campuses of Yokohama International School, Saint Maur International School and Ferris University. Additionally:

- Harbour View Park
- Yokohama Foreign General Cemetery established in 1859, contains graves and memorials to many prominent members of the Bakumatsu and Meiji Period foreign community. There is also a small museum on site with photographs and descriptions of individual community members and their contributions to the development of Yokohama.
- Anglican, Christ Church first established in Yamashita-cho in 1863
- Catholic, Sacred Heart Cathedral first established in Yamashita-cho in 1862
- Protestant, Yokohama Union Church, with the first worship in 1963.
- Kirin Park adjacent to the location of William Copeland's original Spring Valley Brewery, the first beer production facility of any notable size in Japan.
- Yokohama Country & Athletic Club, Japan's oldest sporting and social club founded in 1868.
- Former Negishi Racecourse. Constructed in 1866 as a replacement for the original 1862 Swamp Ground racecourse at the rear of the Kannai foreign settlement. Home to some of the earliest horse races in Japan, conducted in a recognisably European style. Horseracing came to and end at the site in 1942. Now a public park and home to a small museum of horseracing. The main grandstand designed in 1929 by American architect Jay H. Morgan is still a prominent landmark.
- Italian Garden Park
- Gaiety Theatre Museum, built on the site of the Gaiety Theatre established in 1866.
- The Yokohama Cat Museum
- The Yokohama Tin Toys Museum

The neighborhood still maintains a reputation as an exclusive residential district today, along with the Motomachi neighborhood located at the foot of the Yamate hill.

== Transportation ==
Yamate is served by Motomachi-Chūkagai Station, the terminus of the Minatomirai Line subway. Pedestrian access to and from the station and the historic properties on the Yamate ridge road is facilitated by elevators and escalators rising directly from the station on Motomachi Shopping Street to America-yama Park.

Ishikawacho Station on the JR East Negishi Line provides alternative pedestrian access to sites such as the Italian Garden Park, Bluff 18 House and Ferris University. Yamate Station, also on the JR East Negishi Line, serves the Yokohama Country & Athletic Club and the site of the former Negishi Racecourse.

== Education ==
The Yokohama Municipal Board of Education operates public elementary and junior high schools.

Most portions of Yamatecho are zoned to Motomachi Elementary School (元街小学校). However some portions (the following ban: 84-88, 104-176, 178, 188, and 241-245) are zoned to Kitagata Elementary School (北方小学校). The Motomachi Elementary zone and the portions of Yamatecho zoned to Kitagata Elementary are all zoned to Minato Junior High School (港中学校).
