= Harbor View Park (Yokohama) =

Public park in Naka-ku, Yokohama, Japan

Coordinates: 35°26′23.6″N 139°39′18.0″E

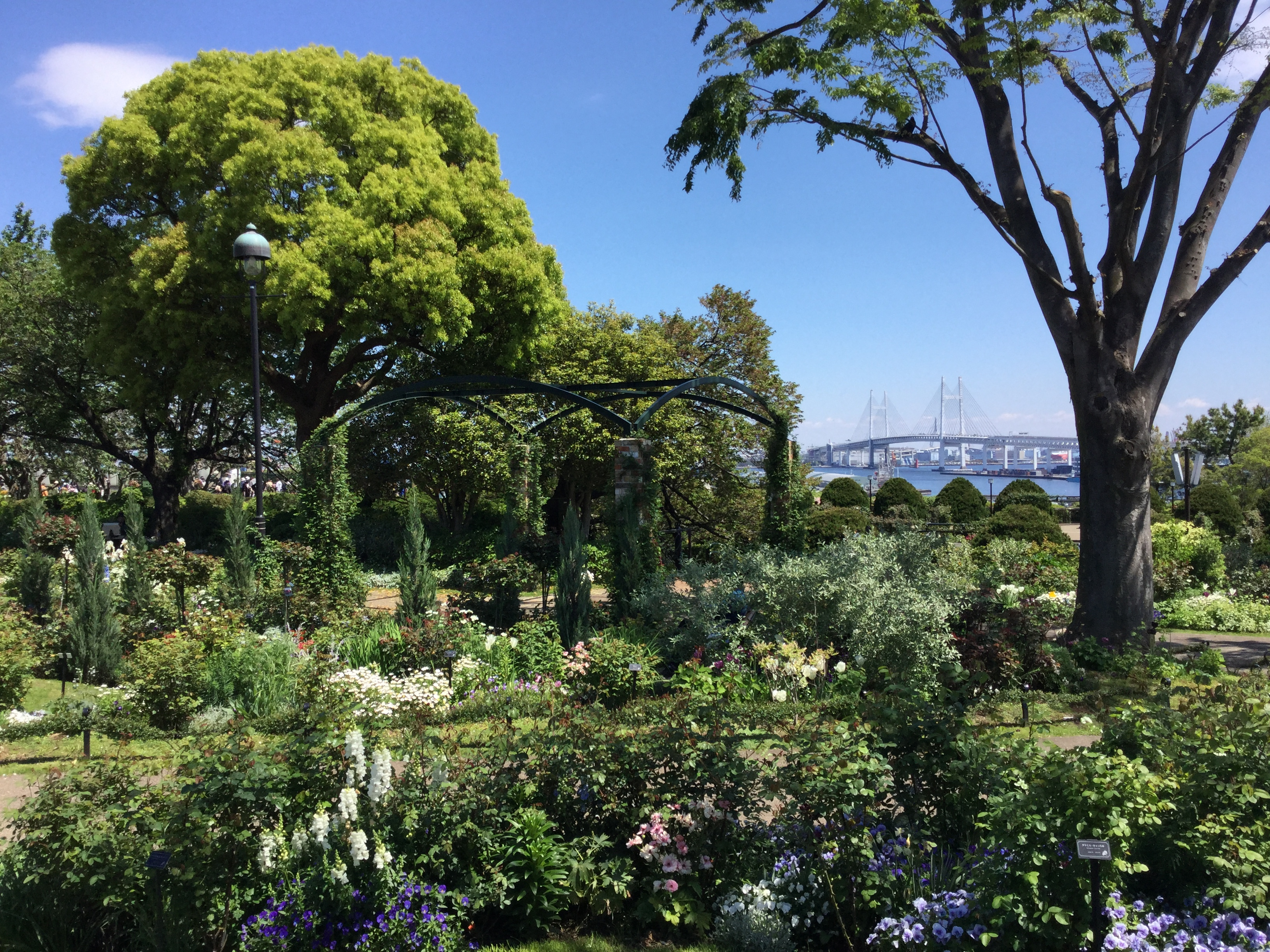
- View from Harbor View Park, Yamate towards the Yokohama Bay Bridge
- Interactive map of Harbor View Park
- Location: Naka-ku, Yokohama, Japan
- Created: 1972

Harbor View Park

Japanese name
- Kanji: 港の見える丘公園
- Hiragana: みなと の みえる おか こうえん
Transcriptions
- Romanization: Minato no Mieru Oka Kōen

Harbor View Hill Park (Japanese: 港の見える丘公園 = Minato no mieru oka koen), or Harbor View Park as it is usually called in English, is a public park on the Bluff, Naka-ku, Yokohama, Japan, looking over the Port of Yokohama.

== Overview ==
Soon after the Port of Yokohama opened for foreign trade in 1859, the site of Harbor View Park was the location of the British Consul's Residence. Between 1862 and 1875 the location also served as part of the camp for the British military garrison. Rebuilt in 1937, the British Consul's Residence remained in use as Crown Property until 1969 until the building and surrounding gardens were returned to the City of Yokohama and turned into 72-hectare public park.

The name of Harbor View Hill Park comes from a popular song of the same name, with the words and music by Tatsumi Azuma (東辰三). He was a resident of Kobe, another port city, so the song is also known as related to Kobe.

Inside Harbor View Park are found: a rose garden, a large fountain, the British House, the 111 Yamate House, the Osaragi Jiro Memorial Hall, the KKR Porthill Yokohama Hotel, the Yokohama Meteorological Observatory, and the Kanagawa Museum of Modern Literature.

Across the street from Yokohama Harbor View Park is the main campus of Yokohama International School. The historic Yokohama Foreign General Cemetery is also located nearby and the area is one of Yokohama's most popular tourist destinations.

== Transportation ==
The nearest stations to Yokohama Harbor View Park are: Ishikawacho Station of the JR Keihin–Tōhoku Line and Motomachi-Chūkagai Station of the Minatomirai Line.

== See also ==
- Motomachi, Yokohama
