= Gaiety Theatre, Yokohama =

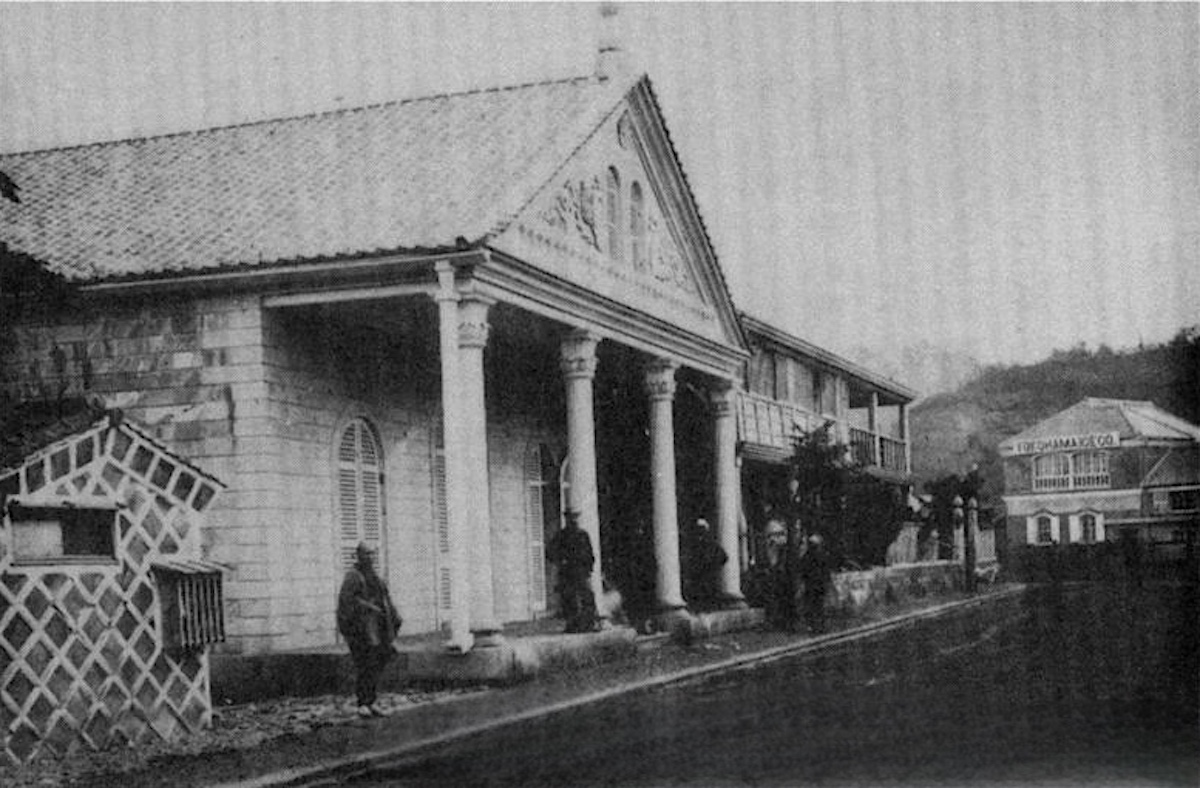
Gaiety Theatre in approximately 1898

The Gaiety Theatre (ゲーテ座) was a public hall in Naka-ku, Yokohama, Japan. It was built in 1866 by Dutch merchant MJB Noordhoek Hegt behind his office at Settlement plot 68. An amateur dramatic club was organized and performed at the public hall. Hegt rented the hall at a very reasonable price for the dramatic club's performances but it soon proved to be too small and was also being used for many other activities so, in 1870, another small theater was built on Honmachi Street and became the original Gaiety Theatre.

This theatre also proved to be too small for the expanding audiences and in 1885 a new building was built on the crest of the Bluff at 256 Yamate and most performances moved to this new building. A touring theatre company led by George Crichton Miln gave some of the first full performances in Japan of Shakespeare's plays in English at the Gaiety Theatre in 1891.

In 1908 this building was renamed as the Yamanote Gaiety Theatre, completely replaced the small Gaiety Theatre on Honmachi Street. Performances continued at this location until the Gaiety Theatre was completely destroyed in the 1923 Great Kantō earthquake.

The Gaiety Theatre was not rebuilt after the earthquake. In 1980, Iwasaki Gakuen Academy built a museum at 256 Yamate to commemorate the school's 50th anniversary. During construction of this museum bricks from the original Gaiety Theater were discovered and used in the construction. The museum includes theatre space which available for public use and displays of props and clothing used for performances at the original Gaiety Theatre.
