= Ehrismann Residence =

1920s building in Yokohama, Japan

- エリスマン邸
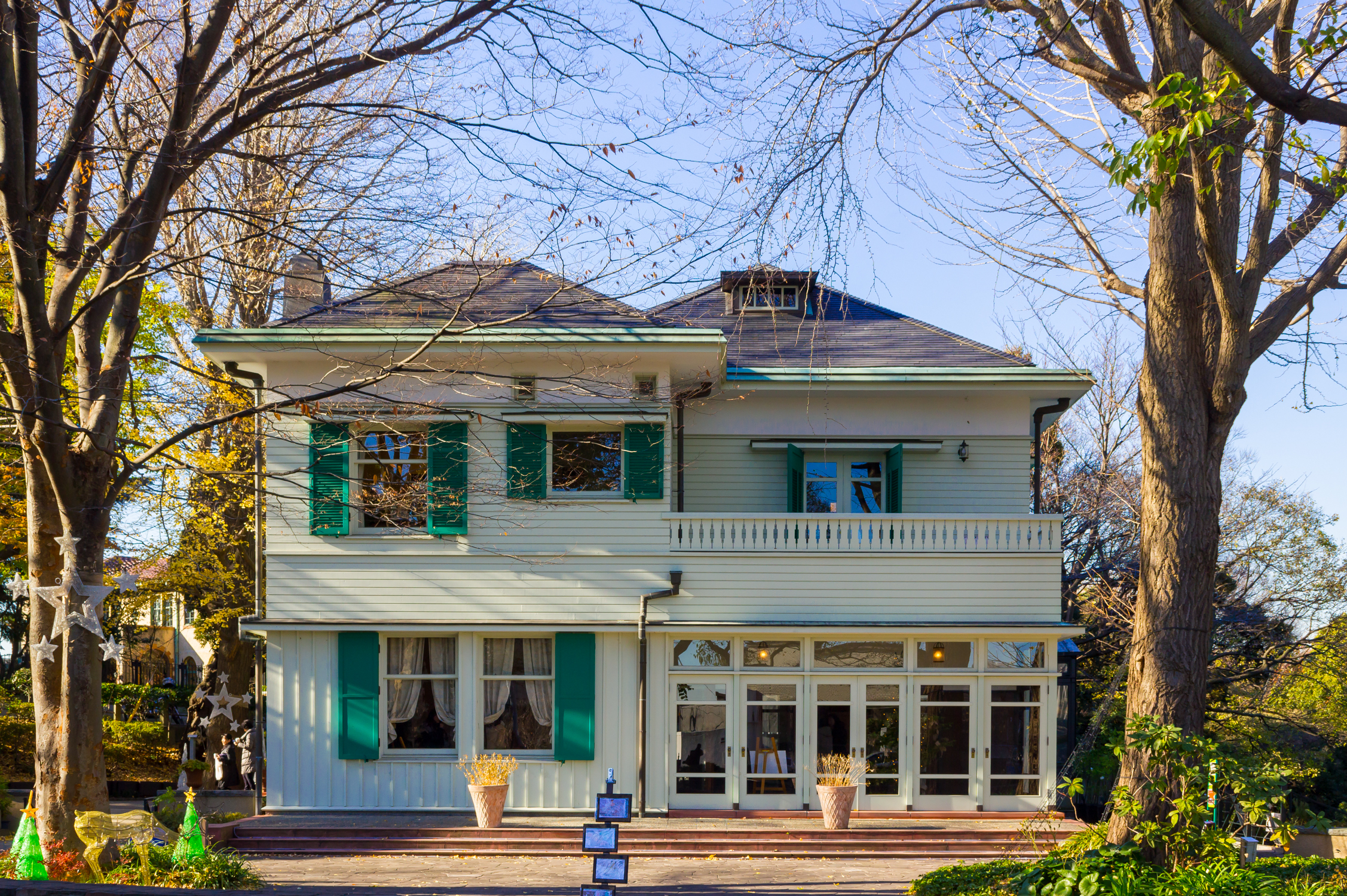
- Ehrismann Residence in 2014
- Interactive map of the Ehrismann Residence area

General information
- Type: Residence, Seeing spot, Tearoom, Theater for lent
- Location: 1-77-4, Motomachi, Naka-ku, Yokohama
- Coordinates: 35°26′15.2″N 139°39′4.5″E
- Construction started: 1925
- Opened: 1990年
- Inaugurated: 1926
- Demolished: 1982 (later reconstructed)
- Client: Fritz Ehrismann
- Owner: Yokohama-shi Midori no Kyokai (ja:横浜市緑の協会)

Technical details
- Structural system: wood frame structure (ja:木構造 (建築))

Design and construction
- Architect: Antonin Raymond
- Main contractor: Shimizu Corporation

Ehrismann Residence (Japanese: エリスマン邸) is a western-style residence built for Fritz Ehrismann, a 20th-century Swiss merchant, located at Motomachi, Naka-ku, Yokohama.

== History ==
The residence was built in 1925–1926 on 127 Yamanote as an abode for Fritz Ehrismann, a Swiss merchant. It was designed by Czech architect Antonin Raymond. After his death, the ownership changed several times. Although no damage was done during World War II, the building was dismantled for the construction of the apartment in 1982. Finding historic value in the structure, the Yokohama municipality purchased the disassembled pieces and reassembled the building within Motomachi park in 1990, 400 m (1,312 ft) northwest of its original location. In 2001, it was designated as a City's historical architecture (ja:横浜市認定歴史的建造物).

== Architecture ==
The building is a two-story wood-frame structure with a basement floor, built by Shimizu Corporation. The first floor was used for a drawing room, kitchen, and living room-cum-dining room. The second floor had bedrooms and a bathroom. Before relocation, a Japanese-style annex existed, which has not been restored on account of components that were lost.

The architect was Antonin Raymond. He was brought to Japan by Frank Lloyd Wright as an assistant in 1919 when the Imperial Hotel was constructed. Although his distinctive five principles of nature, simplicity, straightforwardness, honesty, and economicality underlie the design, this building is his early work as an independent architect, so that the influence of Frank Lloyd Wright can be found in the details, such as furniture, for instance. It has roofs of gentle slant and first-floor eaves, which emphasizes the structure's horizontality. Windows and the other openings are relatively wide, and have blueish-green shutters. Steam heaters were installed in the entire building and, in addition, it has a fireplace in the drawing room as the client requested. Because Ehrismann's wife was Japanese, the bathroom and toilet are separated.

Today it is open to the public for free as a part of Motomachi park (ja:元町公園 (横浜市)). They display records associated with the facility on the second floor, and the kitchen was changed into a coffeehouse called Shoyu Cafe, lit. soy sauce cafe, which serves soy sauce bread, puddings, and other dishes.

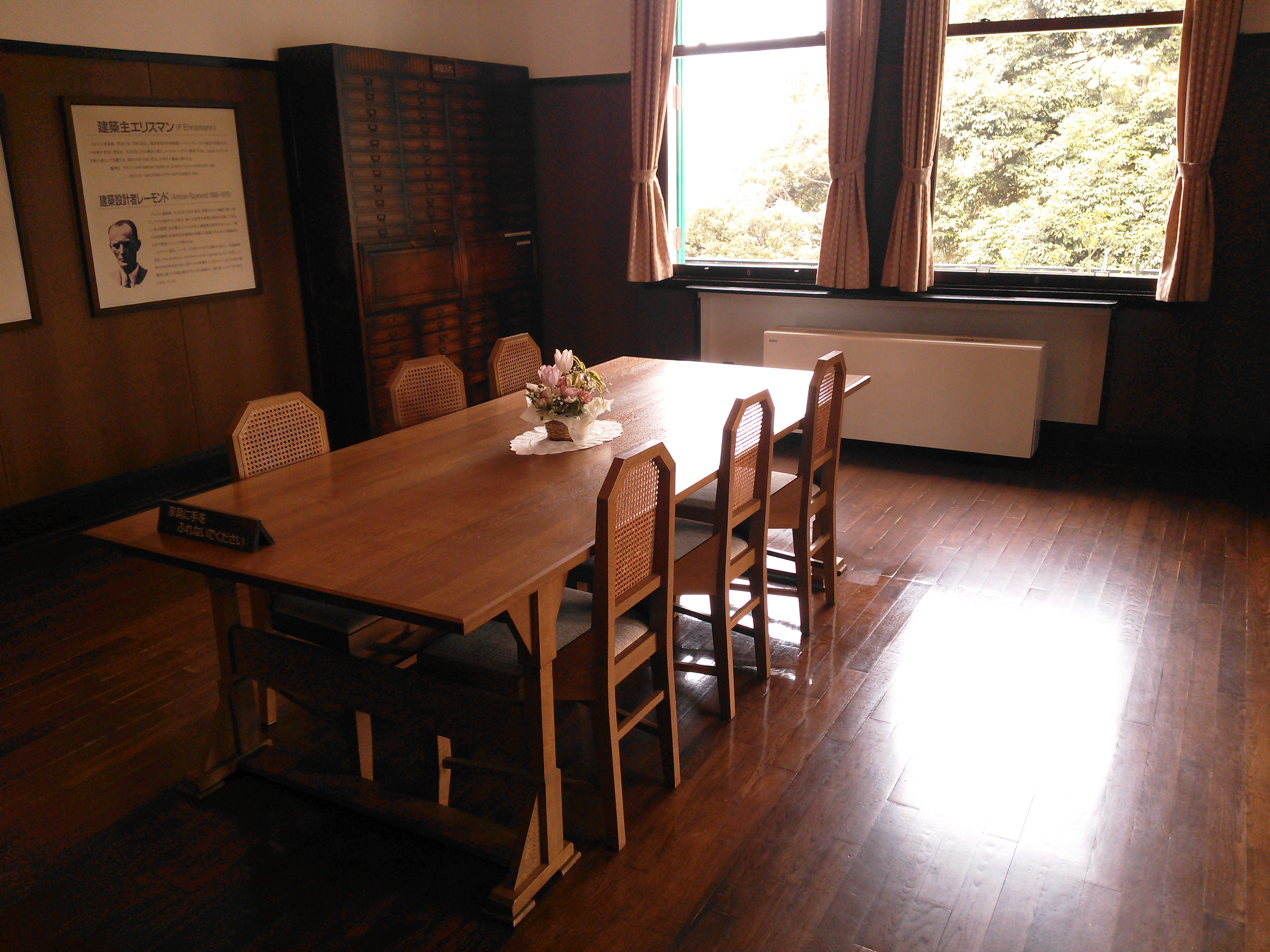
Living room-cum-dining room

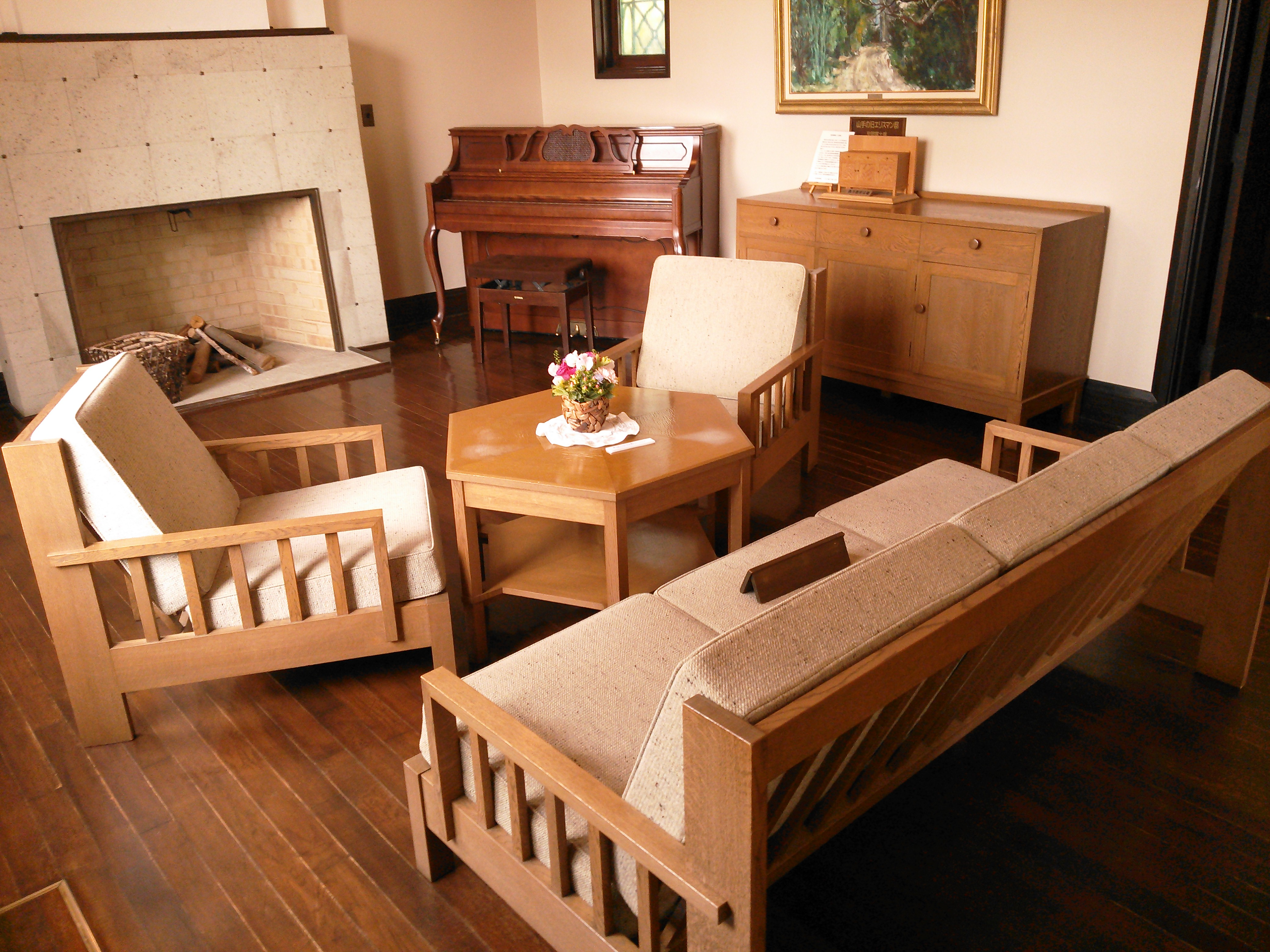
Drawing room
