= Minatomirai Line =

Subway Line in Yokohama, Japan

Minatomirai 21 Line

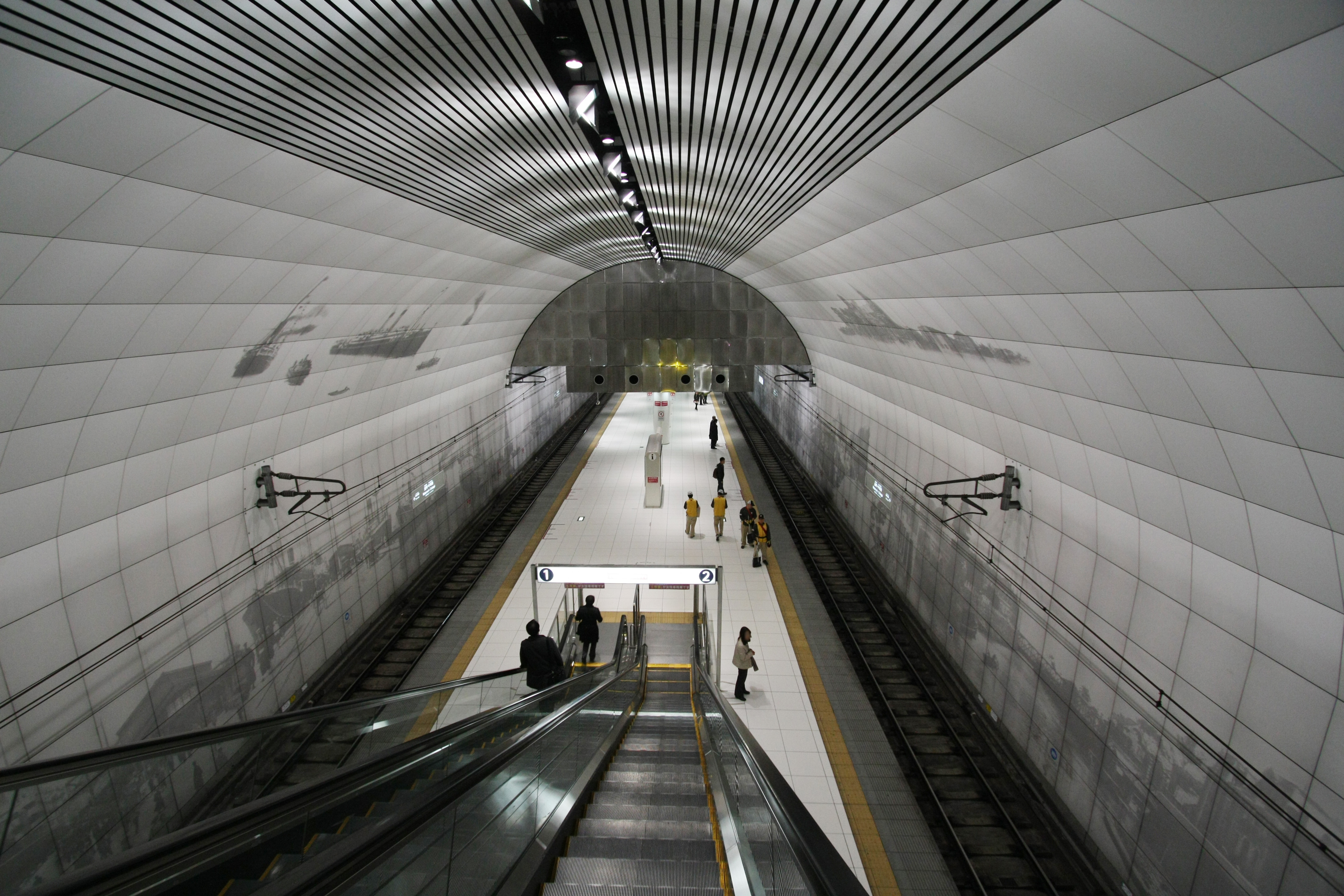
- Motomachi-Chukagai Station

Overview
- Owner: Yokohama Minatomirai Railway Company
- Locale: Yokohama
- Termini: Yokohama; Motomachi-Chūkagai
- Stations: 6

Service
- Type: Heavy rail, Rapid transit
- Operator: Tokyu Corporation (under contract)

History
- Opened: 1 February 2004; 22 years ago

Technical
- Line length: 4.1 km (2.5 mi)
- Track gauge: 1,067 mm (3 ft 6 in)
- Electrification: Overhead line, 1,500 V DC
Route map

The Minatomirai 21 Line (Japanese: みなとみらい21線, romanized: Minato-mirai-21-sen), commonly known as the Minatomirai Line (みなとみらい線, Minatomirai-sen), is a heavy rail line in Yokohama, Japan that runs from Yokohama Station to Motomachi-Chūkagai Station through the Minatomirai 21 business district. The line opened in 2004 and is operated by the Yokohama Minatomirai Railway Company.

Maps and station numbering use navy blue and the route symbol MM to identify the line. The entire line is underground and goes under the Minato Mirai and Kannai districts, as well as numerous islands made of soft reclaimed land and channels, requiring stations to be constructed deep underground. The original above-ground section of the Tōkyū Tōyoko Line between Yokohama and Sakuragichō stations was abandoned and replaced with a new underground connector line to allow through services onto the newly completed Minatomirai Line.

== Operations ==
All trains run from Yokohama Station to Motomachi-Chūkagai Station and vice versa, with no trains stopping and changing direction at any station in between.

=== Staffing/Operational management ===
Operations are managed by Tokyu Railways, with no changing of staff at Yokohama Station; Tokyu staff (train drivers and conductors) continue to support the train over the Minatomirai portion of the line as well. Station-side staffing is provided by Minatomirai employees with the exception of Yokohama Station, which is managed by Tokyu Railways. Many Minatomirai employees are former employees of Tokyu Railways. Train management is controlled by Yokohama Minatomirai Railway Company at an operational command center. Railway facilities are maintained by Yokohama Minatomirai Railway, but the actual maintenance work is contracted to Tokyu Railways employees. Because Yokohama Minatomirai Railway does not own its own rail yard, trains are parked overnight at Tokyu Railways' Motosumiyoshi Rail Yard and at Motomachi-Chūkagai Station. There are plans to construct a portion of track for parking additional trains underneath Harbor View Park starting in 2020.

=== Through services with the Tōkyū Tōyoko Line ===
The Minatomirai Line is essentially an extension of the Tōkyū Tōyoko Line. The two lines operate as one, with no crew change at Yokohama station where trains cross between the two lines, in contrast to standard procedure with other line operators in Japan.

=== Through services with Tokyo Metro Fukutoshin Line ===
With the completion of the underground link line to the Tokyo Metro Fukutoshin Line on 16 March 2013, Minatomirai Line trains run onto the Fukutoshin Line via the Tōkyū Tōyoko Line and beyond to the Tōbu Tōjō Line, Seibu Yūrakuchō Line, and Seibu Ikebukuro Line. Along with the link to the Fukutoshin Line being established, Tōkyū Tōyoko and Minatomirai express trains (limited express/commuter limited express/express) were expanded from eight-car to ten-car configuration (with the exception of a portion of regular express trains). Platforms were extended at Minatomirai stations receiving express trains in order to be able to accommodate the extended ten-car configuration. Regular trains stopping at each station on the line continue to operate in the eight-car configuration.

=== Train services ===
All regular trains on the Minatomirai Line use the same services as the Tōyoko Line.

==== S-train ====
The S-train is the first service on the Minatomirai Line with fully reserved seating. On weekends and holidays it makes two and a half round trips (to Motomachi-Chūkagai Station twice and from the same station three times). All trains continue to the Seibu Ikebukuro Line, and one round trip begins and ends at the Seibu Chichibu Line's Seibu-Chichibu Station. Within the Minatomirai Line, these trains stop at Minatomirai Station and Motomachi-Chūkagai Station, but tickets are not sold for final destinations at these stations. S-train services use the Seibu 40000 series train exclusively.

==== Limited express ====
Limited Express (特急, Tokkyū) trains run during daylight hours during the week and at all times excepting early morning and late night on weekends and holidays. All services are operated by 10-car sets. Limited express trains stop at Yokohama Station, Minatomirai Station, and Motomachi-Chūkagai Station within the Minatomirai Line.

==== Commuter Limited Express ====
Commuter Limited Express (通勤特急, Tsūkin Tokkyū) operate during the morning rush hour and in the evening on weekdays. The trains use 10-car sets and stop at all stations on the Minatomirai Line with the exception of Shin-Takashima Station. Many trains continue to the Fukutoshin Line via the Tōyoko Line as Commuter Express services.

==== Express ====
Express (急行, Kyūkō) operate all day long. The trains stop at all stations on the Minatomirai Line with the exception of Shin-Takashima Station. Most daytime trains use 8-car sets, but 10-car sets may be used during peak hours in the morning and evening.

==== Local ====
Local (各駅停車, Kakueki-teisha) trains stop at all stations. 8-car sets are used to align with the Tōkyū, Yokohama, and Tokyo Metro lines.

== Female-only car ==
In conjunction with the Tokyu Tōyoko Line, the Tokyo Metro Fukutoshin Line, the Seibu Ikebukuro Line, and the Tōbu Tōjō Line, the first car is a female-only car during certain times of the day to prevent sexual harassment.

== Stations ==
Trains stop at stations marked "●" and pass those marked "|".

| No. | Station | Local | Express | Commuter Express | Limited Express | S-Train | Transfers |
|---|---|---|---|---|---|---|---|
↑ Through-running to/from Tōyoko Line, Fukutoshin Line, Seibu Yurakucho Line and Seibu Ikebukuro Line.↑
| MM-01 | Yokohama 横浜 | ● | ● | ● | ● | ● | Tōyoko Line (TY21; through service); Tōkaidō Line (JT05); Keihin–Tōhoku Line (JK12); Negishi Line (JK12); Yokohama Line (JK12); Yokosuka Line (JO13); Shōnan–Shinjuku Line (JS13); Main Line (KK37); Sōtetsu Main Line (SO01); Blue Line (B20) |
| MM-02 | Shin-takashima 新高島 | ● | | | | | | | | | |
| MM-03 | Minatomirai みなとみらい | ● | ● | ● | ● | ● | |
| MM-04 | Bashamichi 馬車道 | ● | ● | ● | | | | | |
| MM-05 | Nihon-ōdōri 日本大通り | ● | ● | ● | | | | | |
| MM-06 | Motomachi-Chūkagai 元町・中華街 | ● | ● | ● | ● | ● | |

== Rolling stock ==
- Tokyu 5000 series 8-car EMUs
- Tokyu 5050 series 8-car EMUs
- Tokyu 5050-4000 series 10-car EMUs
- Y500 series 8-car EMUs
- Tokyo Metro 10000 series 10-car EMUs (since September 2012)
- Tokyo Metro 17000 series 8/10-car EMUs (since February 2021)
- Tobu 9000 series 10-car EMUs (since March 2013)
- Tobu 50070 series 10-car EMUs (since March 2013)
- Seibu 6000 series 10-car EMUs (since March 2013)
- Seibu 40000 series 10-car EMUs (since 25 March 2017)
- Seibu 40050 series 10-car EMUs (since 2019)
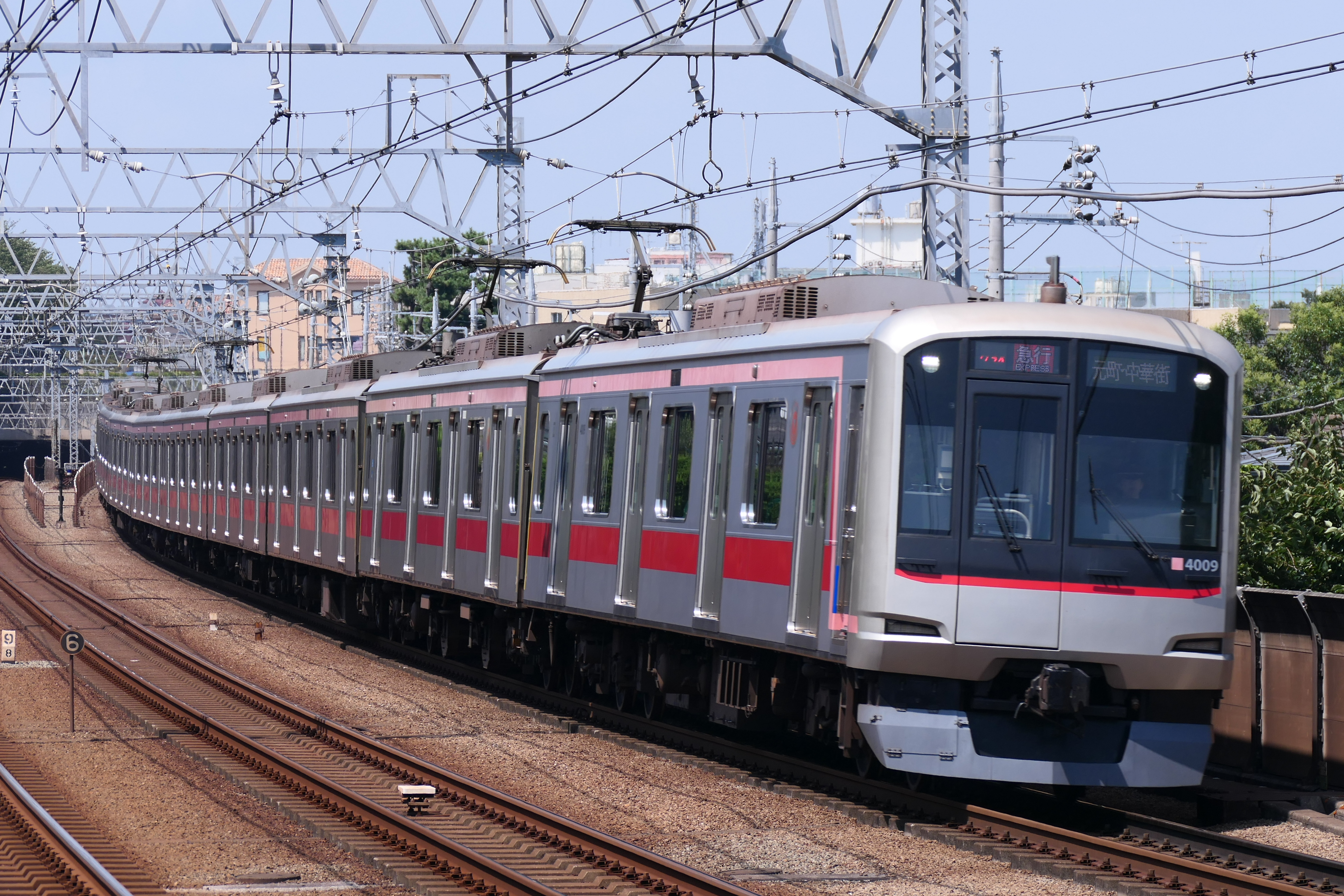
Tokyu 5050–4000 series

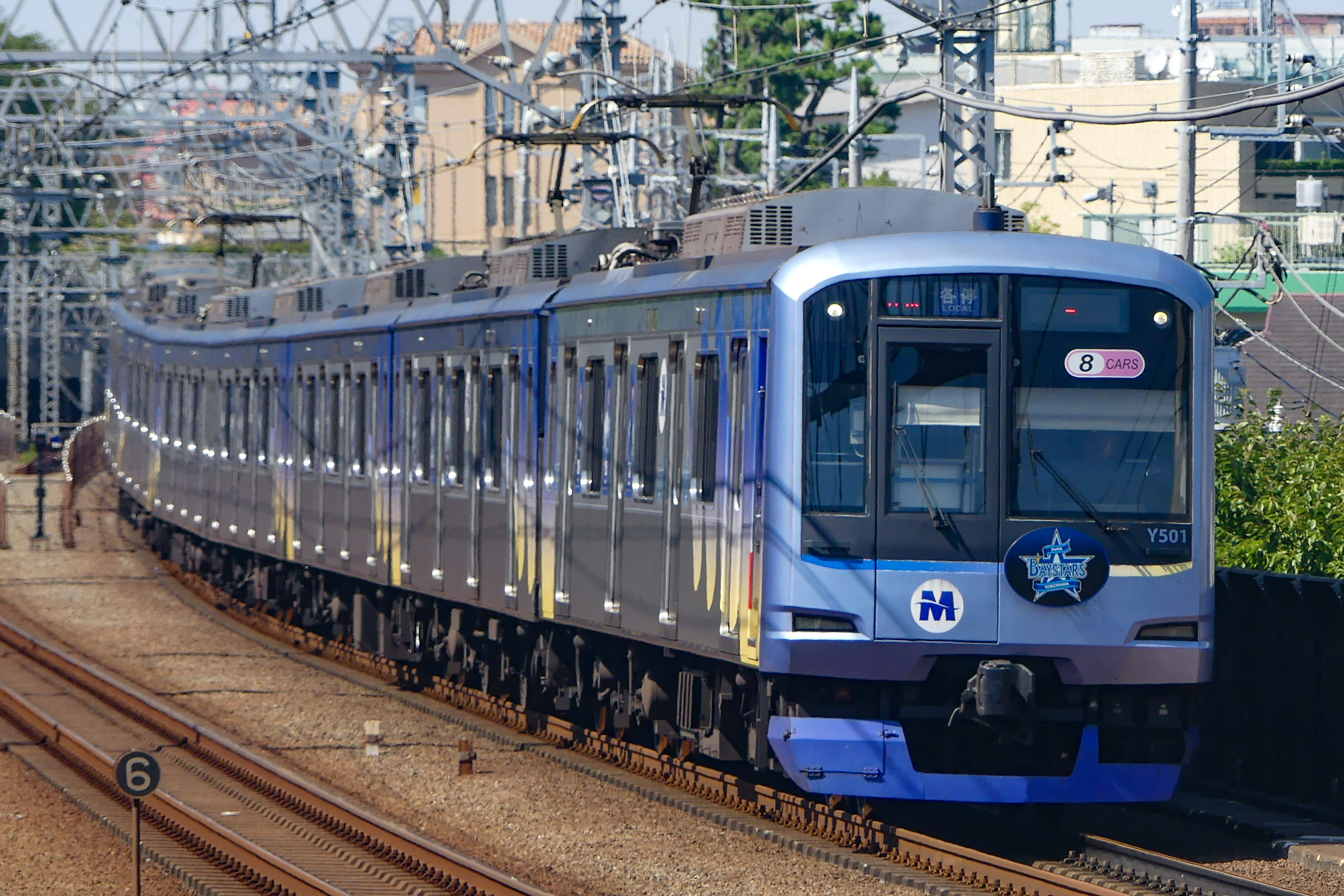
Y500 series

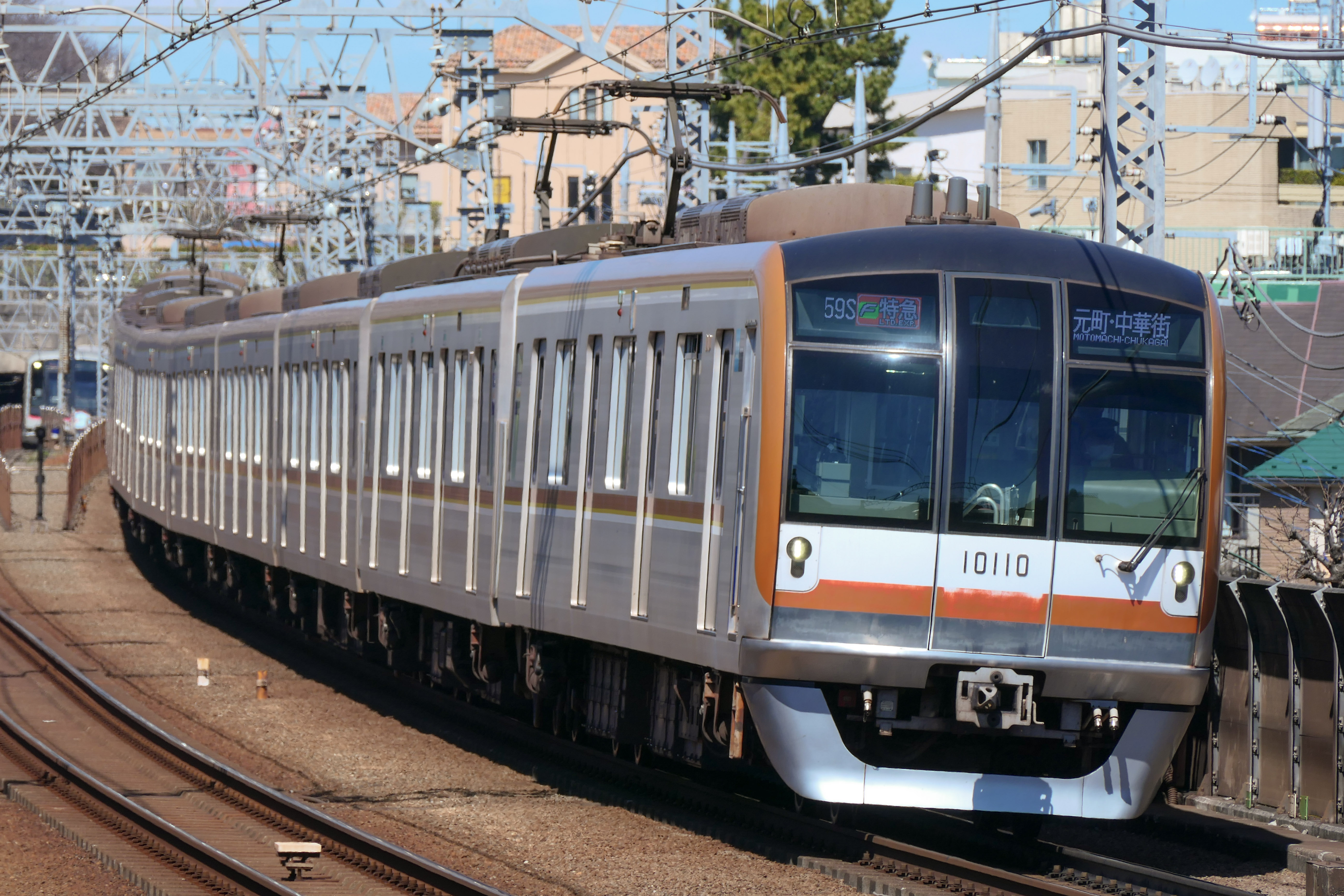
Tokyo Metro 10000 series

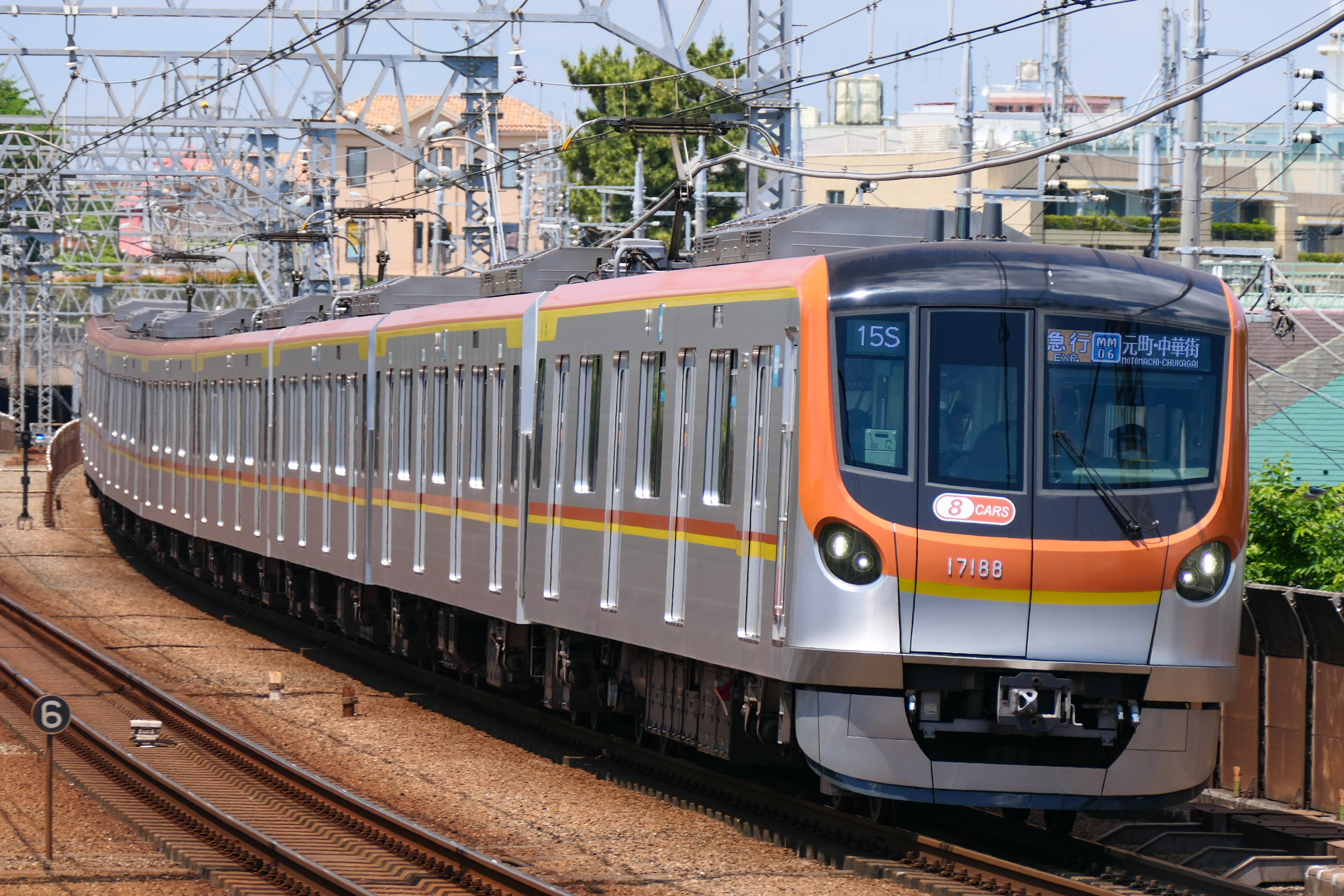
Tokyo Metro 17000 series

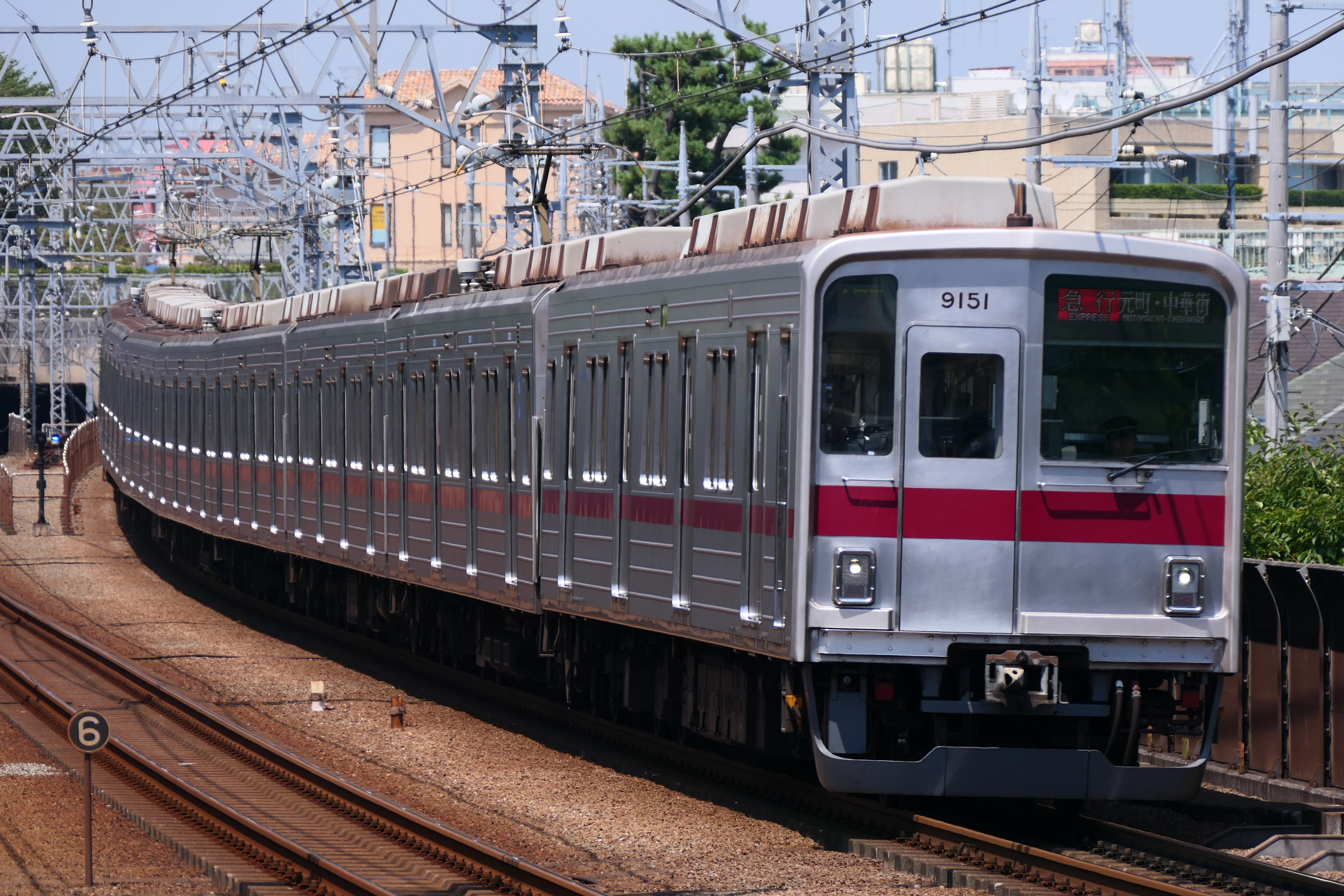
Tobu 9000 series

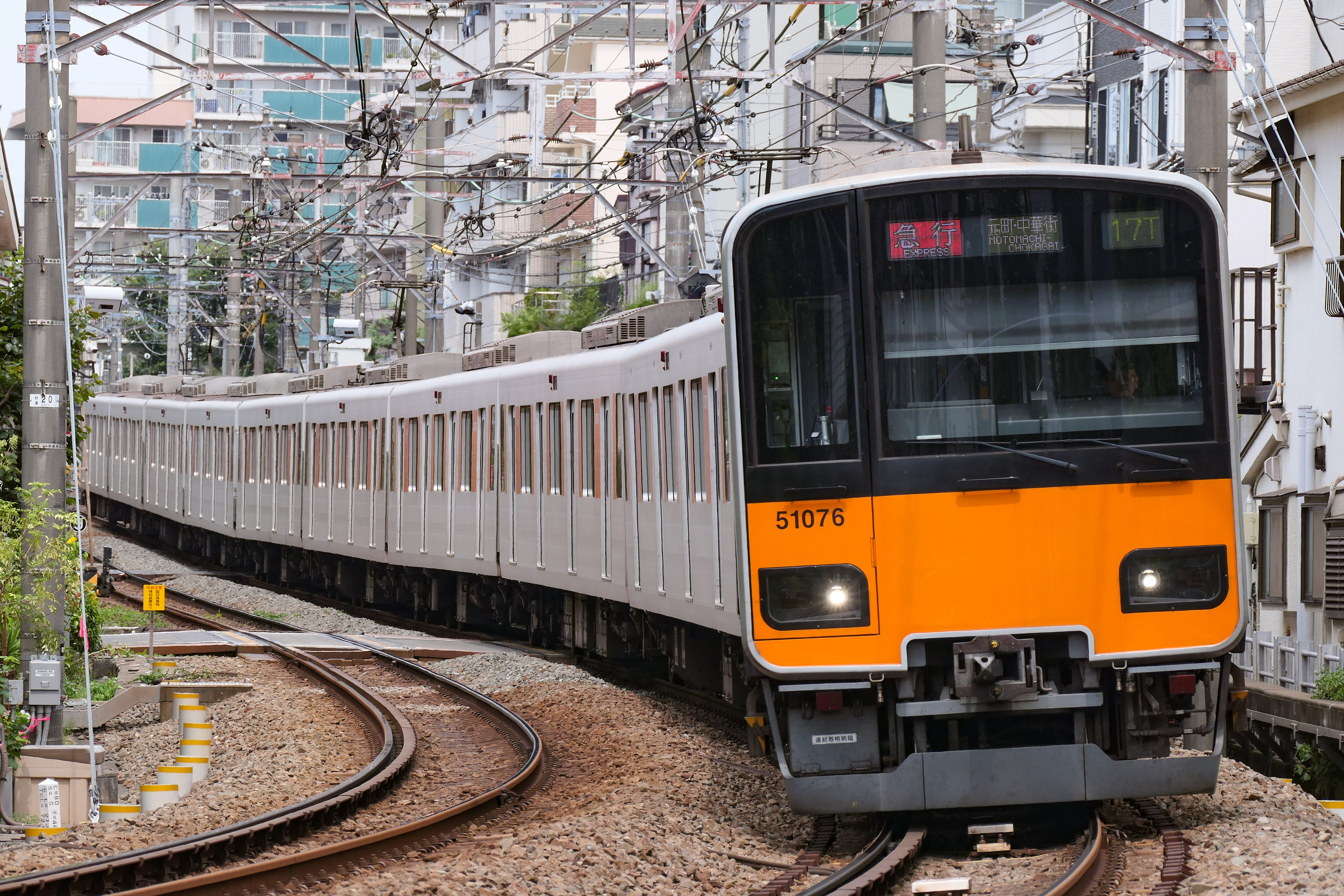
Tobu 50070 series

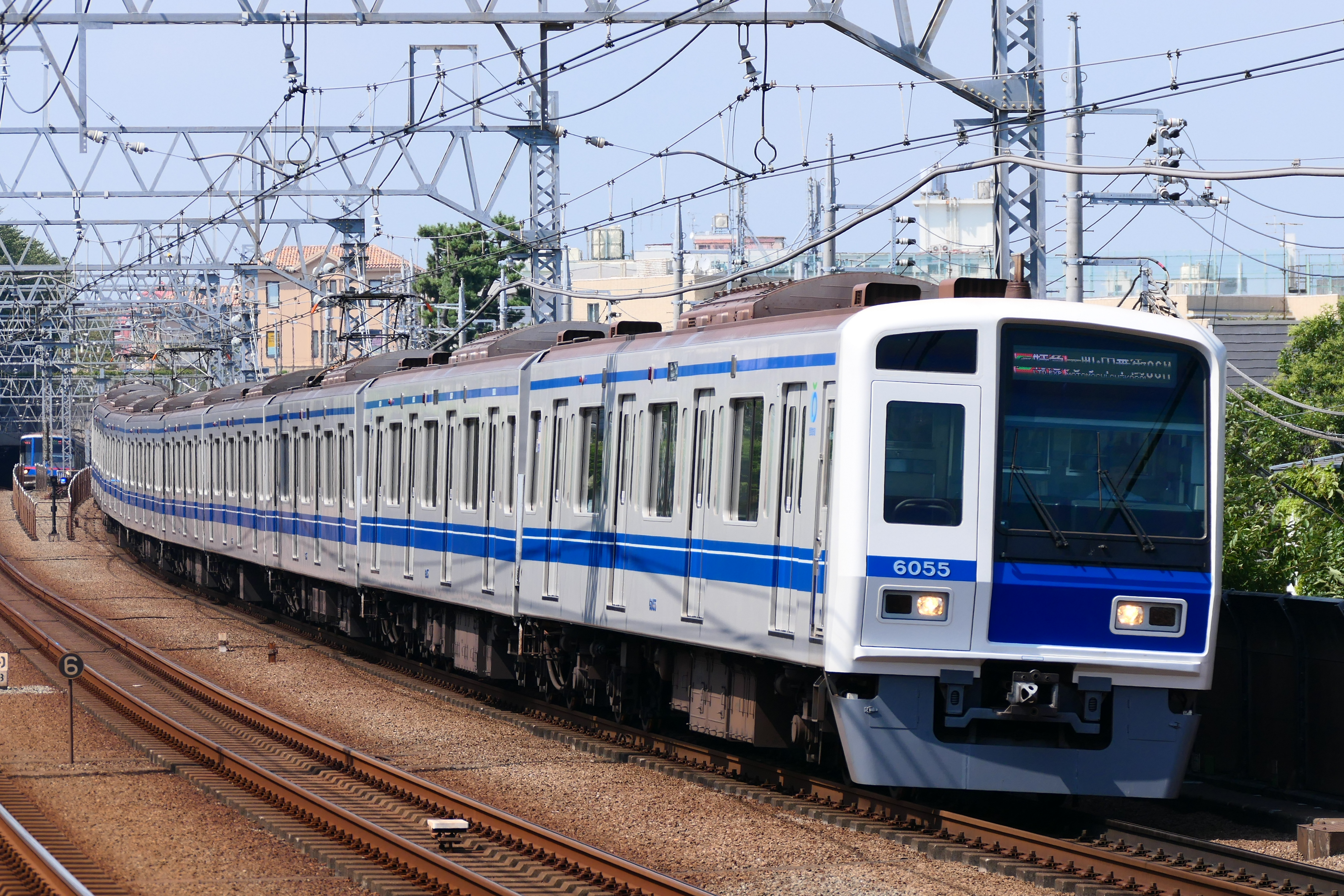
Seibu 6000 series

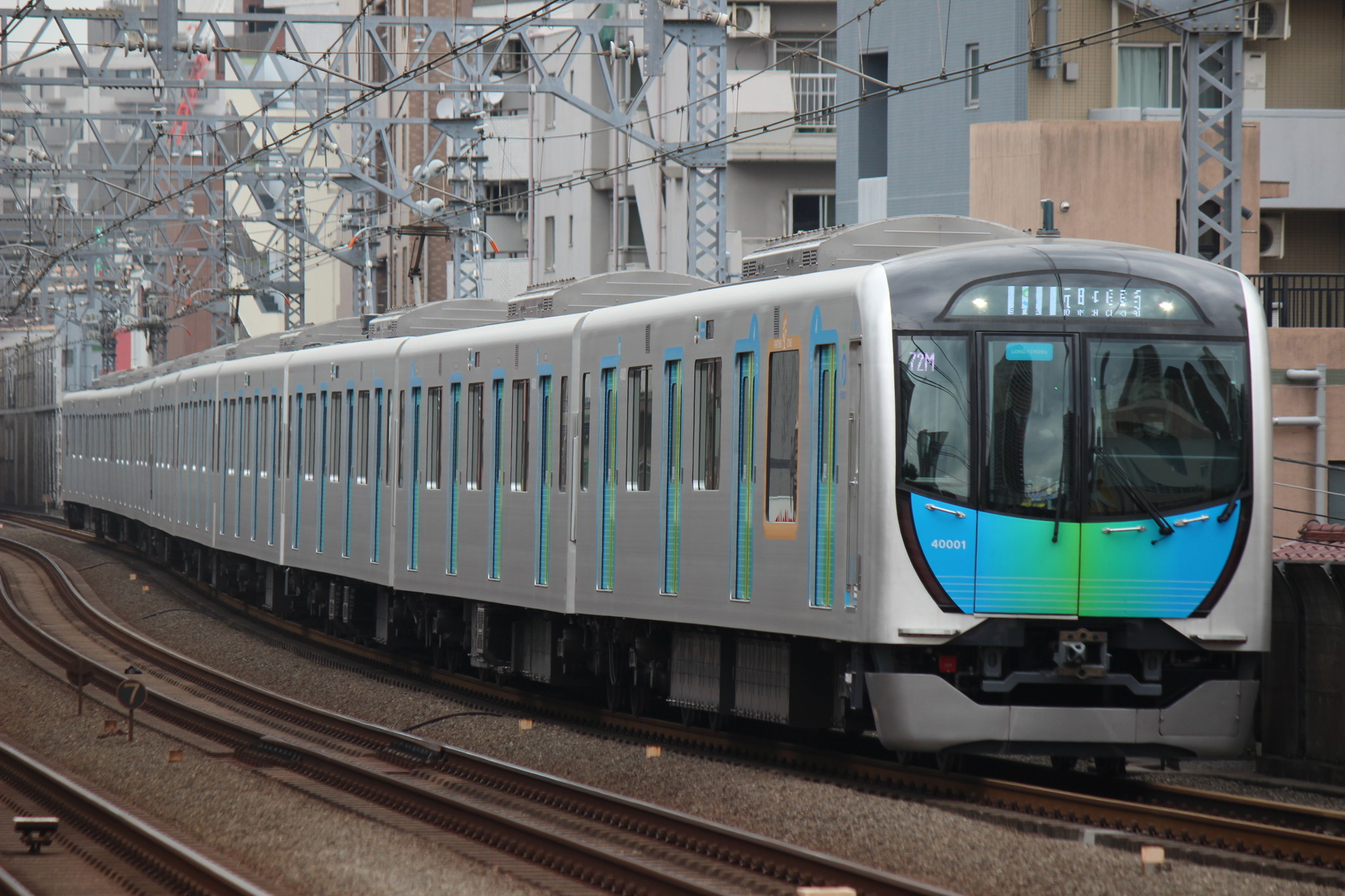
Seibu 40000 series

=== Former rolling stock ===
- Tokyu 8000 series 8-car EMUs
- Tokyu 8090 series 8-car EMUs
- Tokyu 8500 series 8-car EMUs
- Tokyu 9000 series 8-car EMUs (until 15 March 2013)
- Tokyo Metro 03 series (until 15 March 2013)
- Tokyo Metro 7000 series 8/10-car EMUs (from September 2012 until April 2022)
- Seibu 6050 series 10-car EMUs (since March 2013 until 30 March 2024)
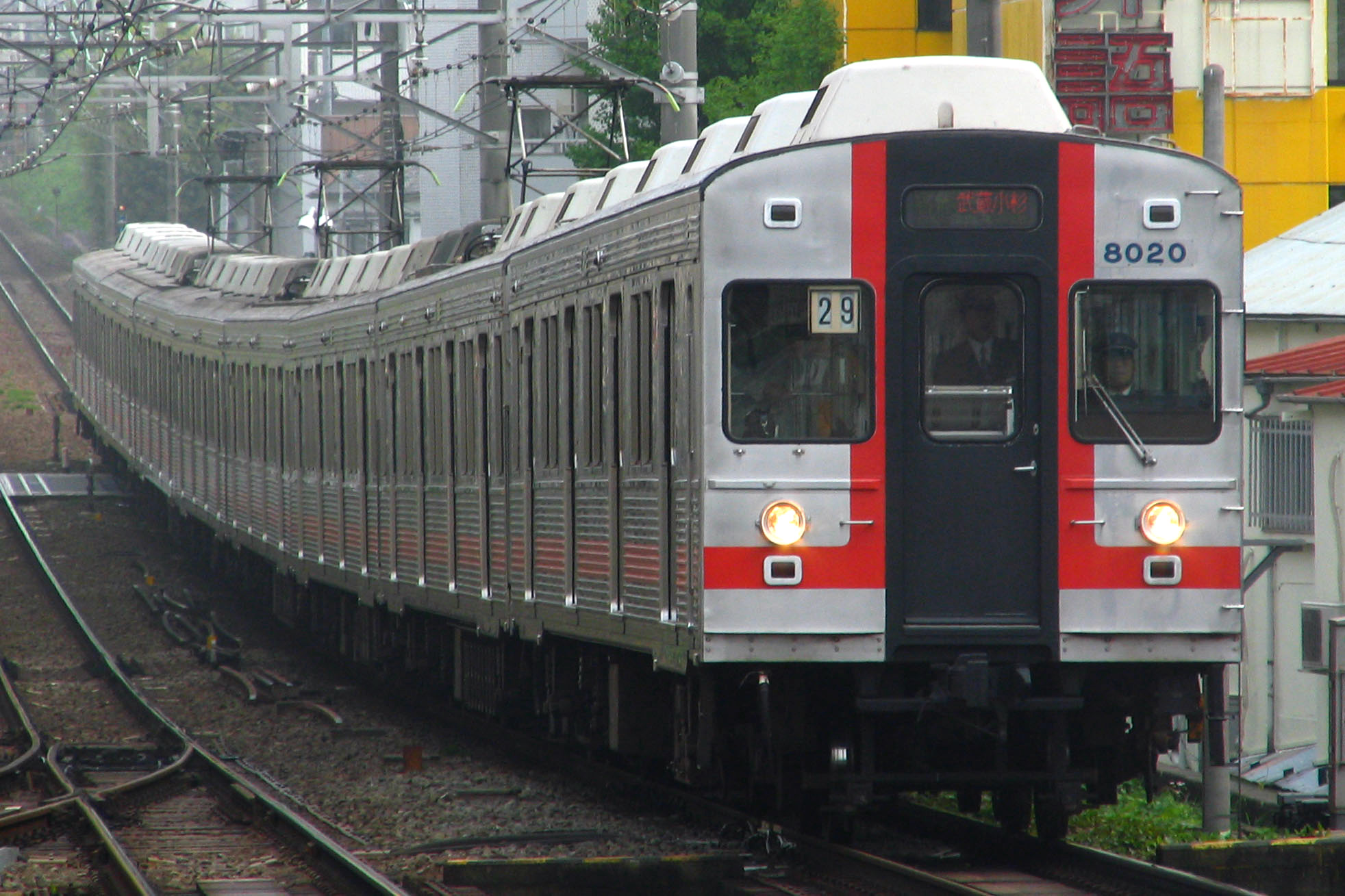
Tokyu 8000 series

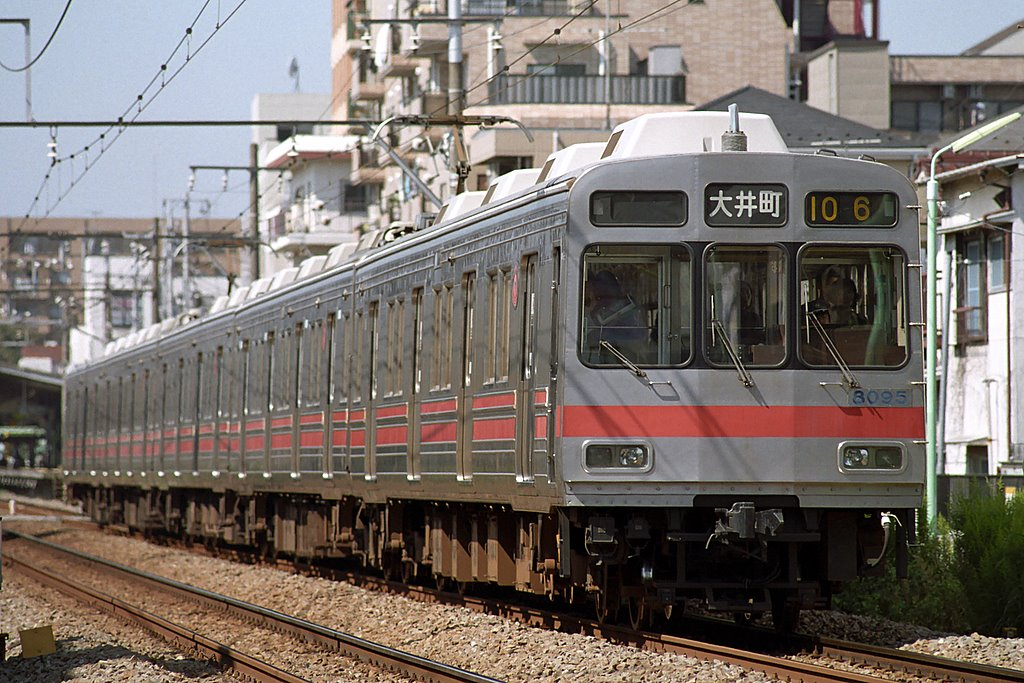
Tokyu 8090 series

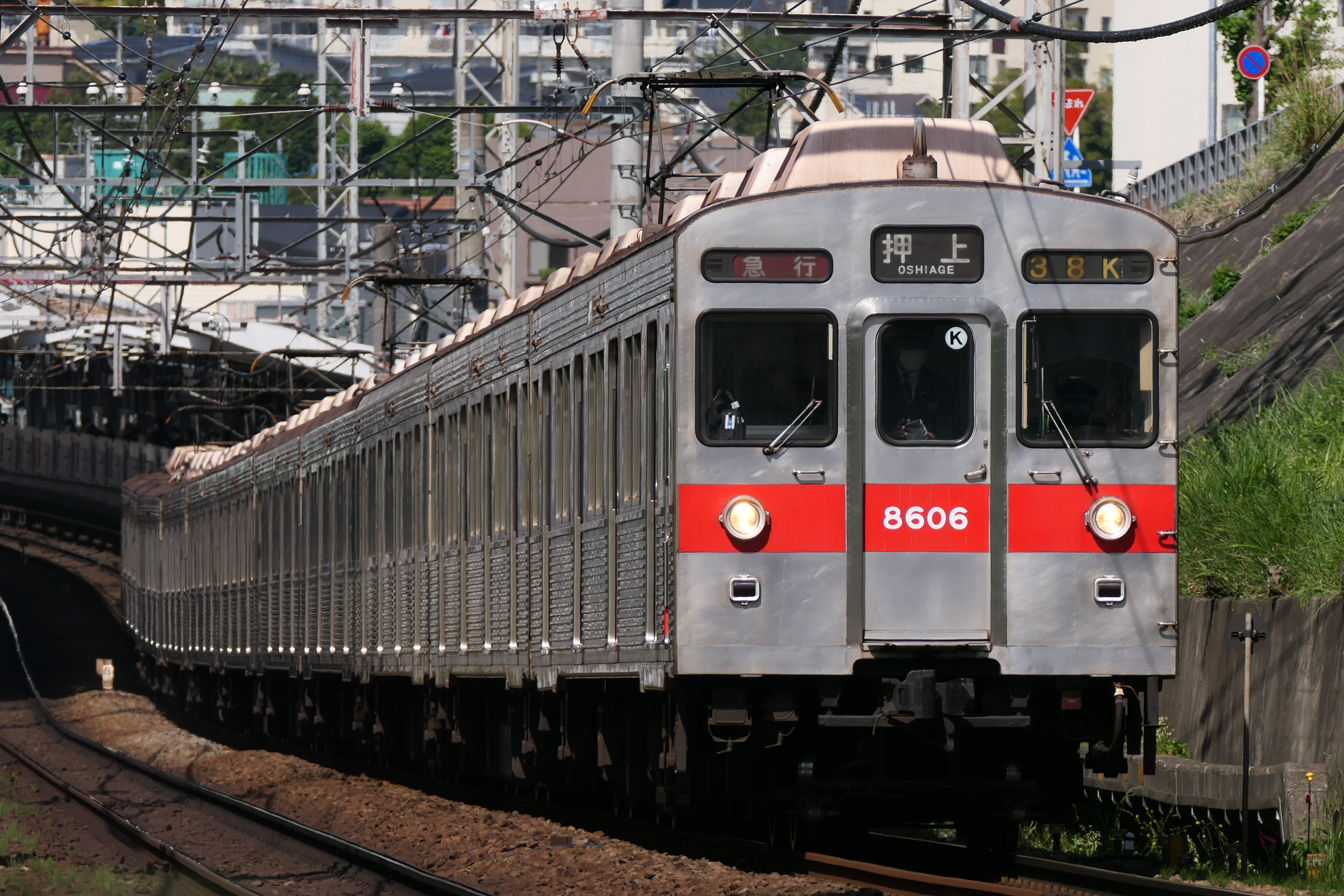
Tokyu 8500 series

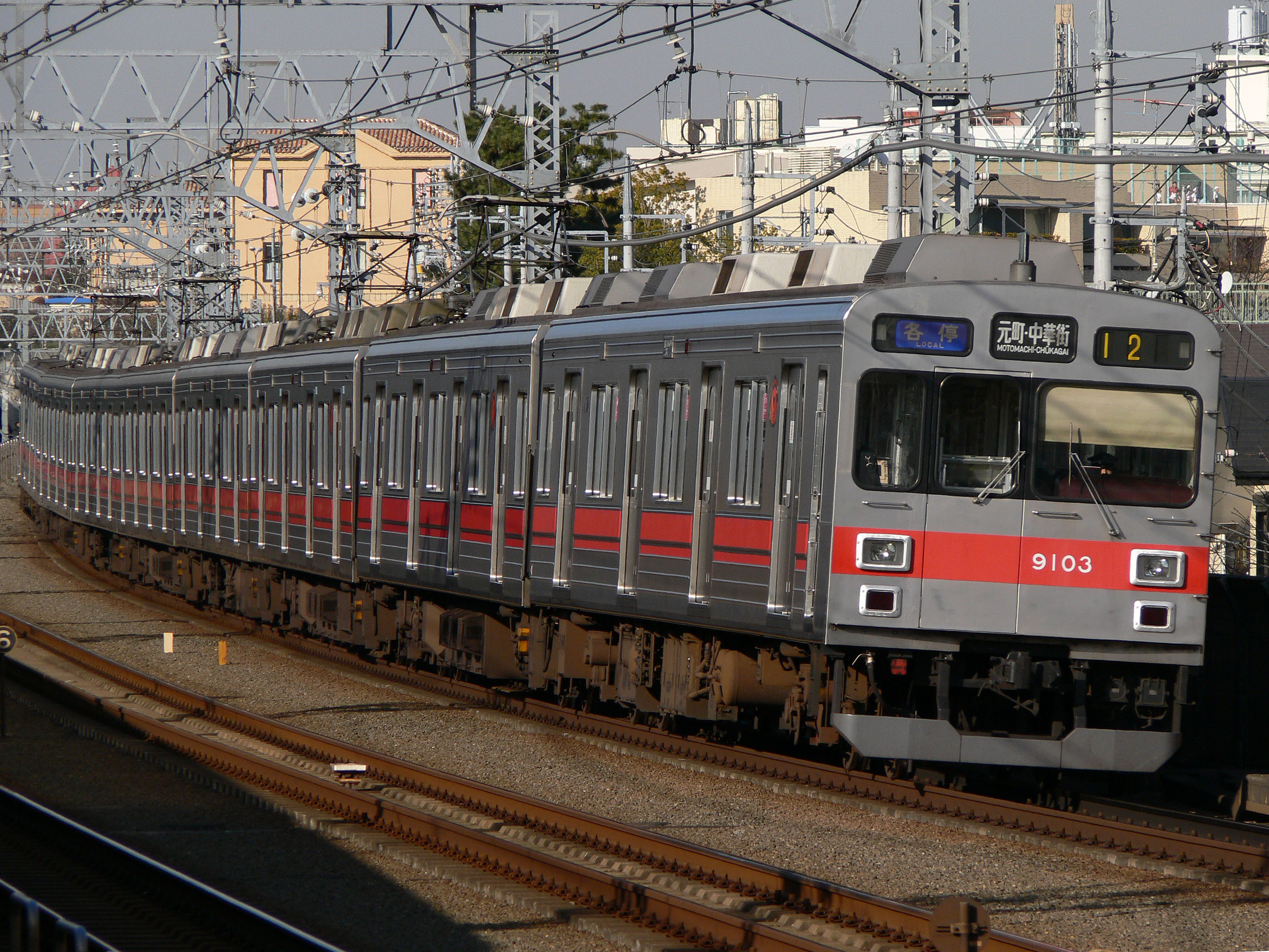
Tokyu 9000 series

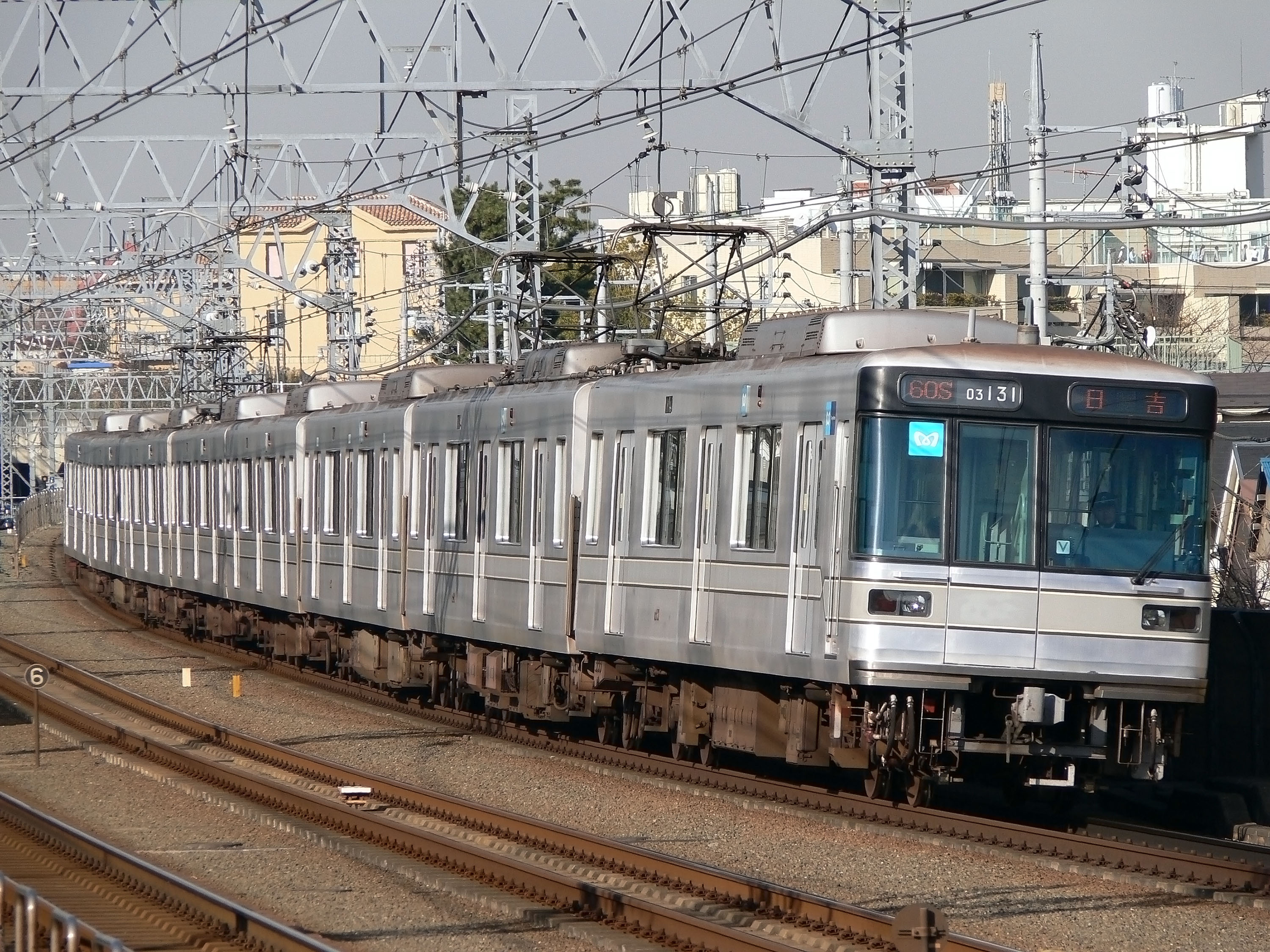
Tokyo Metro 03 series

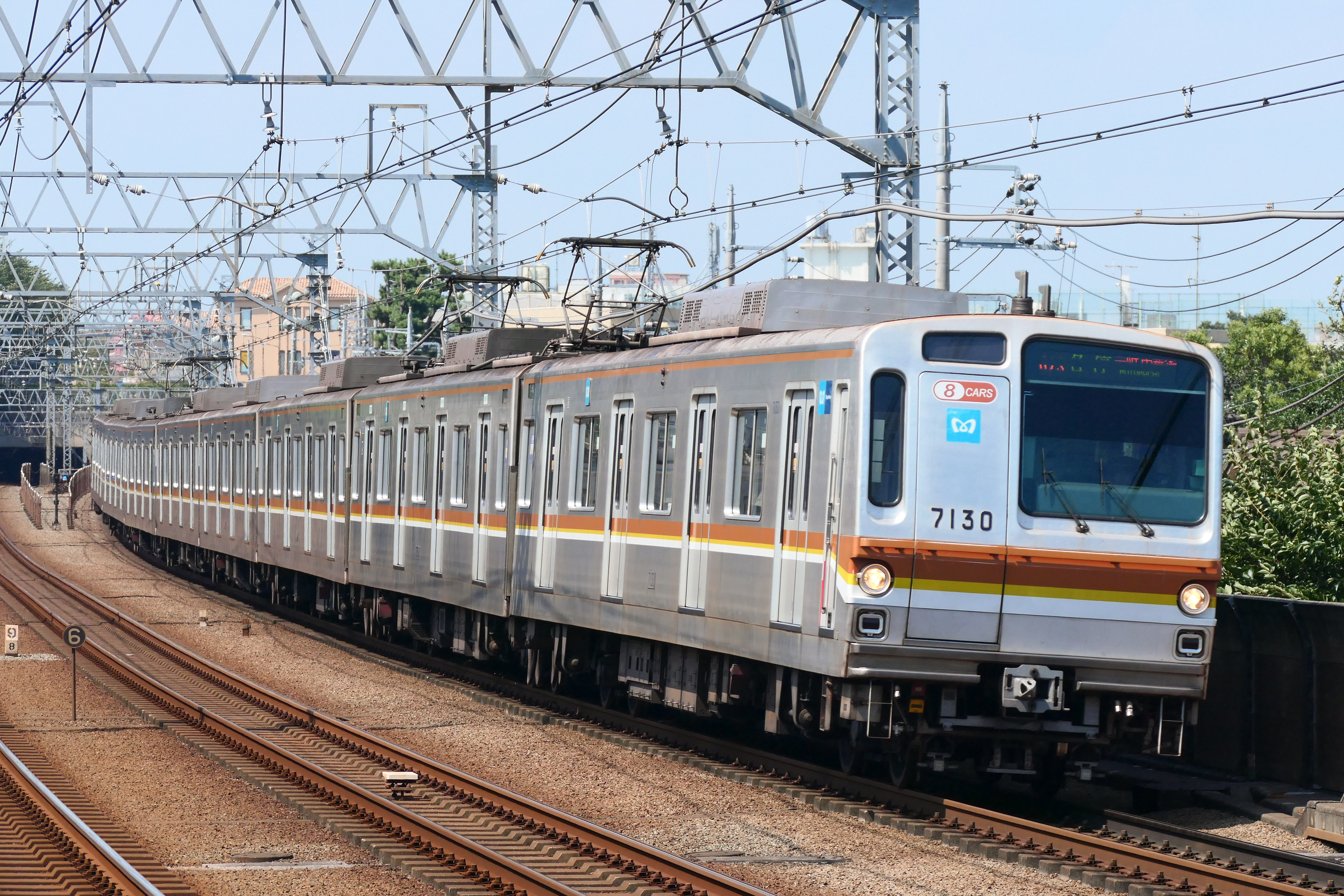
Tokyo Metro 7000 series

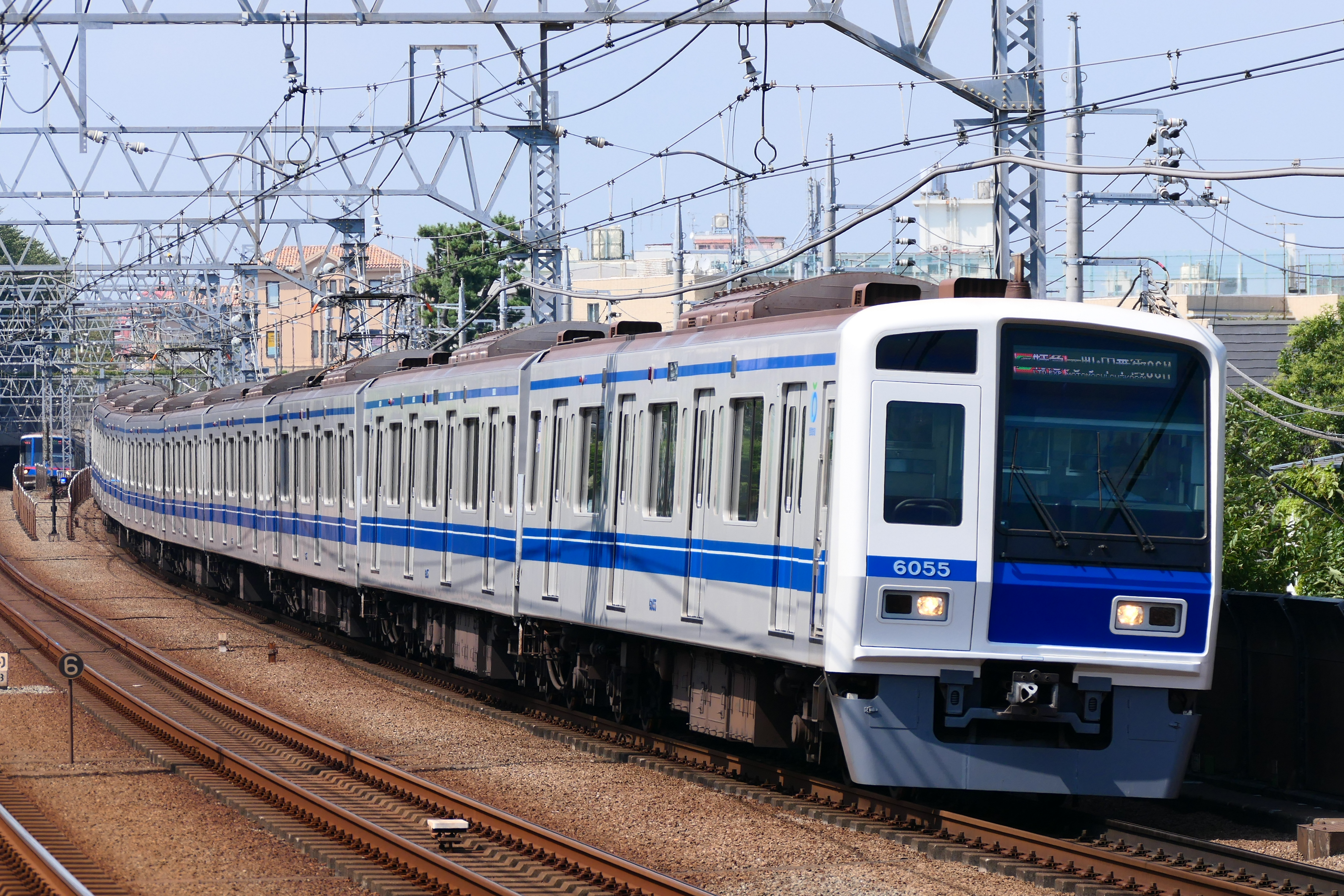
Seibu 6000 series

== History ==
Construction of the line started in 1993, and the line was opened to the public on 1 February 2004.

The eight-car Tokyo Metro 10000 series entered service on the Minatomirai Line and Tokyu Toyoko Line from 7 September 2012.

== Incidents and accidents ==
On 13 March 2026 at 12:20 pm, due to an overhead line outage that occurred between Ōkurayama Station on Tōyoko Line and Minatomirai Station, two trains in both directions forcing to stop. Therefore, both Tōyoko Line and Minatomirai Line have been suspended for 9.5 hours before service resumed on all lines around 9:50 pm. As a result, the incident caused the cancellation of 297 trains in both directions, affecting approximately 123,000 people.

== See also ==
- List of rapid transit systems
