= Motomachi, Yokohama =

District of Yokohama, Japan

Motomachi 元町
- District in Naka Ward, Yokohama
- Location within Japan
- Coordinates: 35.440425°N 139.649686°E
- Country: Japan
- Region: Honshu
- Prefecture: Kanagawa
- City: Yokohama
- Time zone: UTC+9 (JST)
- Website: www.motomachi.or.jp/en

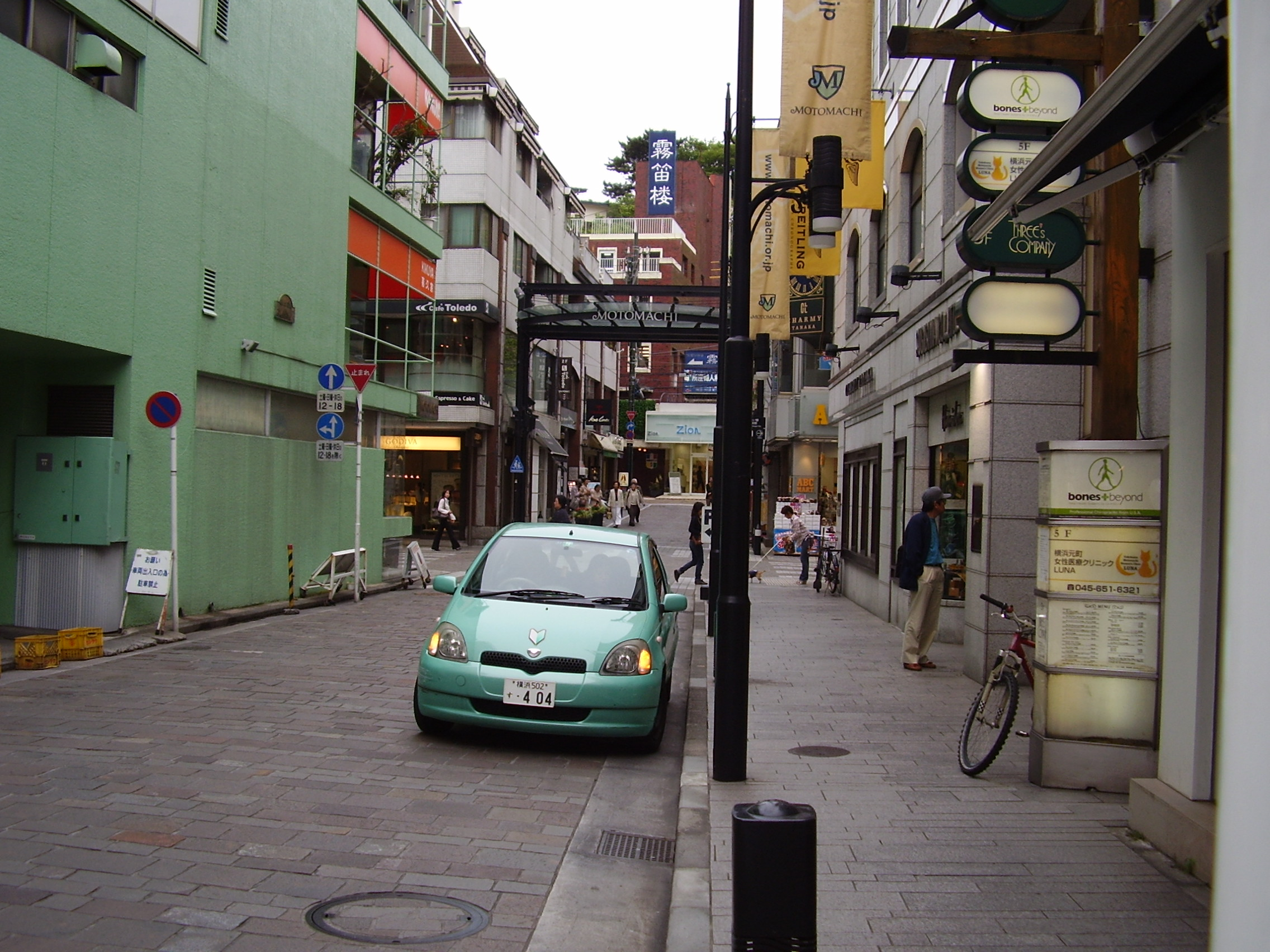
Motomachi

Motomachi (元町, Motomachi) is a district in Naka Ward, Yokohama, Japan. It is situated immediately west of Yamate and east of Chinatown. The area features the Motomachi Shopping Street, which is a five-block-long stretch of boutiques and shops. It is known in Japan for its cosmopolitan atmosphere, distinctive fashion, and Western influences.

== History ==
Motomachi was originally a quiet farming and fishing village until 1859, when the Port of Yokohama was opened. Since then, the nearby Kannai district became the foreigners' business district, and the adjacent Yamate and Yamashitacho districts became the foreigners' residential districts. Situated in between Yamate to the east and Kannai and Yamashitacho to the west, Motomachi became frequented by many foreigners. Shops and businesses were opened, catering to the needs of foreigners.

Soon after the start of the Meiji era, the number of foreign residents increased. And western influence became more evident in Motomachi, with the opening of many cafés, bakeries, and boutiques. Such shops were uncommon in Japan at the time, and Motomachi helped introduce Western culture into Japan, as part of what is called bunmei kaika (文明開化). This was the beginning of the Motomachi Shopping Street as it is known as of 2008.

In the 1970s, the "Motomachi Shopping Street" produced a new style of fashion called the hama tora (ハマトラ) (short for "Yokohama traditional"). The most famous producers of the hama tora style were Kitamura , Mihama , and Fukuzō , three of the most fashionable boutiques in Motomachi.

== Naming ==
Upon the opening of the Port of Yokohama in 1859, this area was called Motomura (本村). The name was changed to Motomachi in 1860.

== Education ==
Motomachi is zoned to Motomachi Elementary School (元街小学校), which caters to Minato Junior High School. (横浜市立港中学校).
