= Nakano-fujimichō Station =

Metro station in Tokyo, Japan

Coordinates: 35.690564°N 139.667033°E

Nakano-fujimicho Station 中野富士見町駅

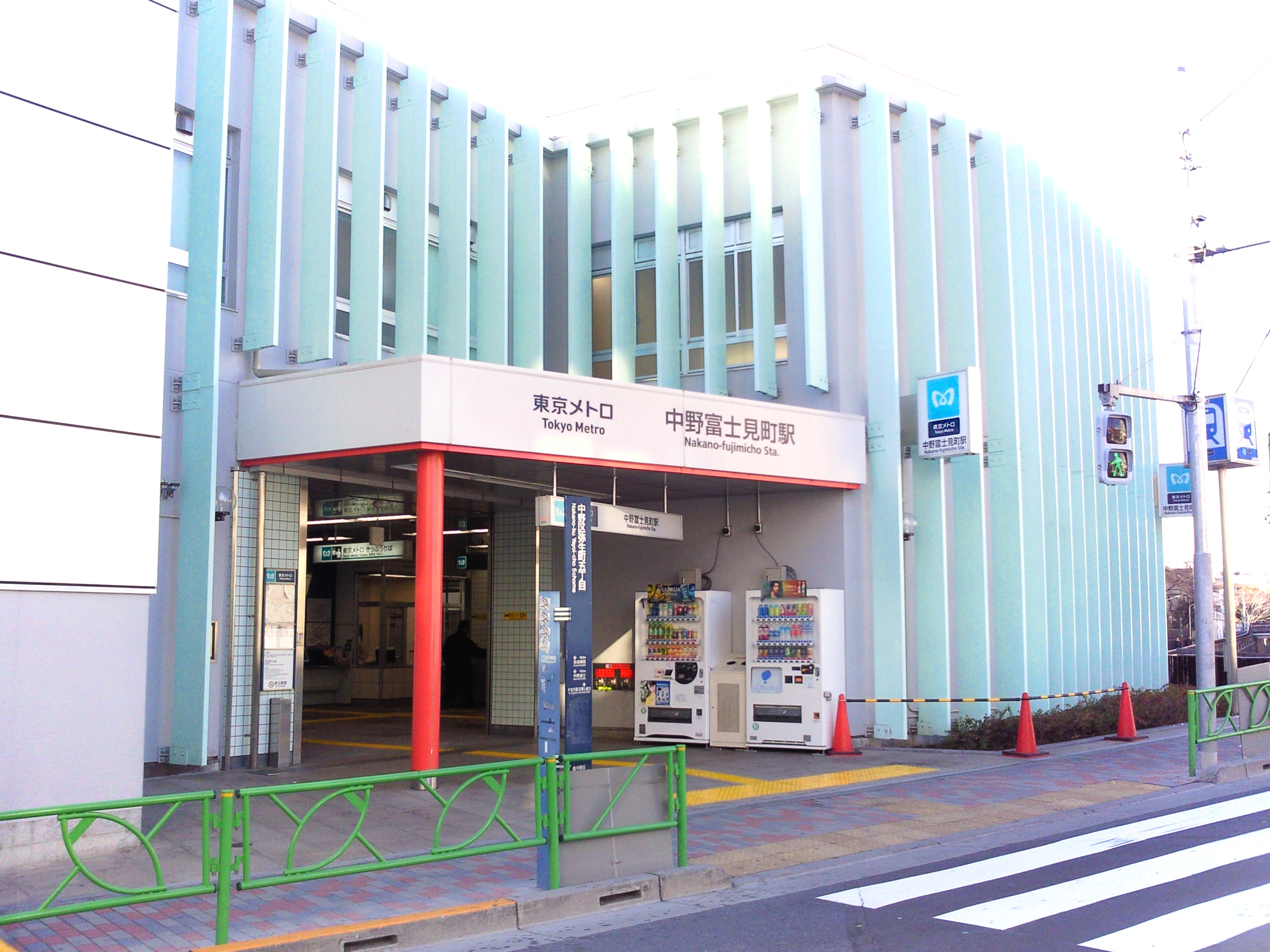
- Station entrance, January 2011

General information
- Location: 5-24-4 Yayoichō, Nakano, Tokyo （東京都中野区弥生町5-24-4） Japan
- Operator: Tokyo Metro
- Line: Marunouchi Line – (Branch line)
- Connections: Bus stop

Construction
- Structure type: Underground

Other information
- Station code: Mb-04

History
- Opened: 8 February 1961; 65 years ago

Passengers
- FY2013: 18,285 daily

Services
Preceding station	Tokyo Metro	Following station
Hōnanchō Terminus	Marunouchi Line (Branch line)	Nakano-shimbashi towards Nakano-sakaue
Location
- Location within Tokyo Yamanote Loop Location within Tokyo wards area Location within Japan

Nakano-fujimicho Station (中野富士見町駅, Nakano-fujimichō-eki) is a subway station numbered Mb-04 on the Tokyo Metro Marunouchi Line in Nakano, Tokyo, Japan, operated by the Tokyo subway operator Tokyo Metro.

== Lines ==
Nakano-fujimicho Station is served by the 3.2 km (2.0 mi) Hōnanchō branch of the Tokyo Metro Marunouchi Line from Nakano-sakaue to Hōnanchō, and is 1.9 km (1.2 mi) from Nakano-sakaue. During the daytime, the station is served by 3-car trains shuttling between Nakano-sakaue and Hōnanchō, but during the morning and evening peaks, due to its location next to the line's maintenance depot, the station is also served by some 6-car through trains starting and terminating here, which run to and from Ikebukuro at the eastern end of the main line. The station is numbered "Mb-04".

== Station layout ==
The station has two side platforms serving two tracks on the first basement (B1F) level. The single entrance, ticket vending machines, and ticket barriers are located at ground level.

=== Platforms ===
1	Marunouchi Line	for Hōnanchō
2	Marunouchi Line	for Nakano-sakaue, Shinjuku, and Ikebukuro

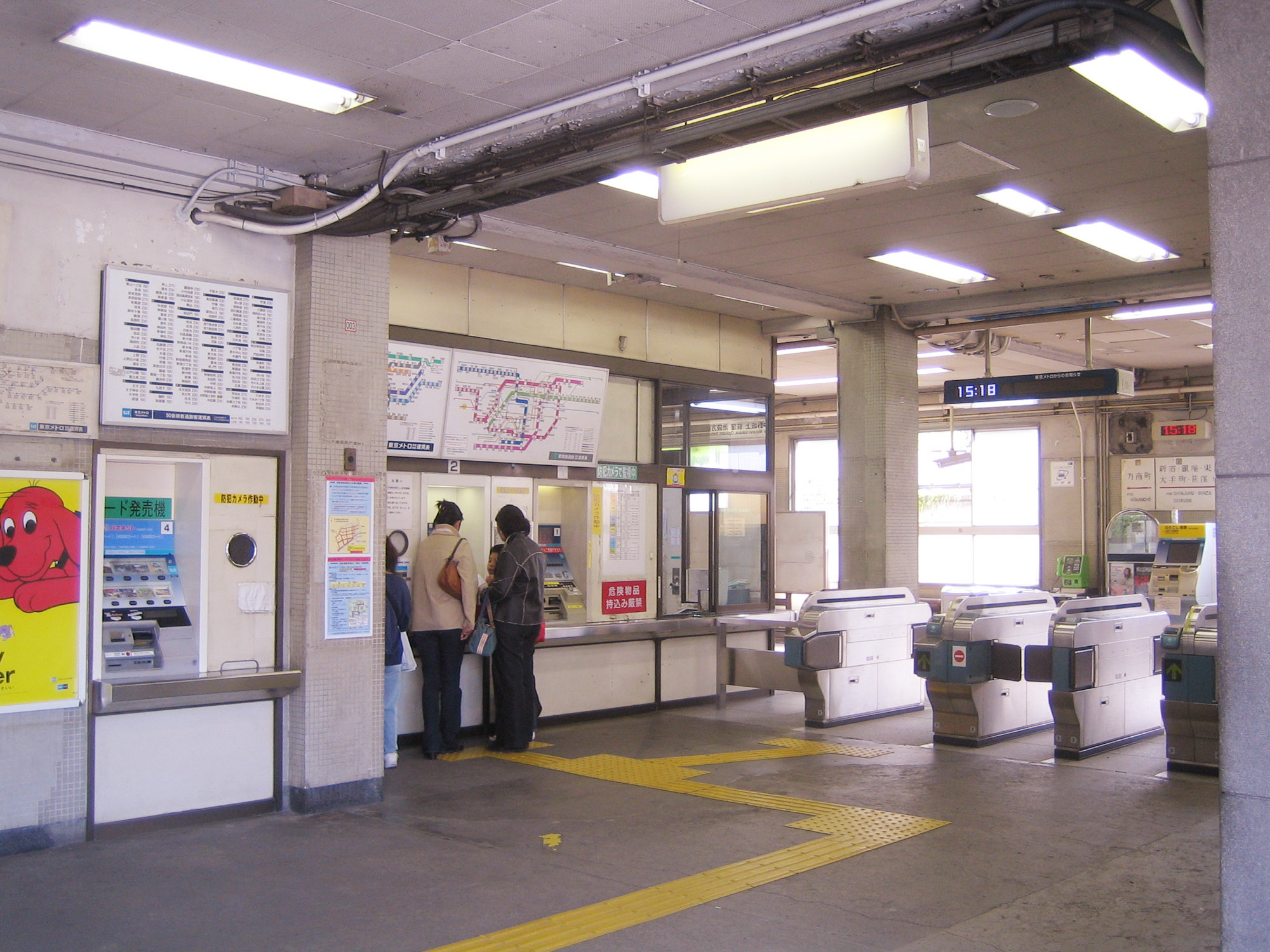
The ticket barriers, May 2006

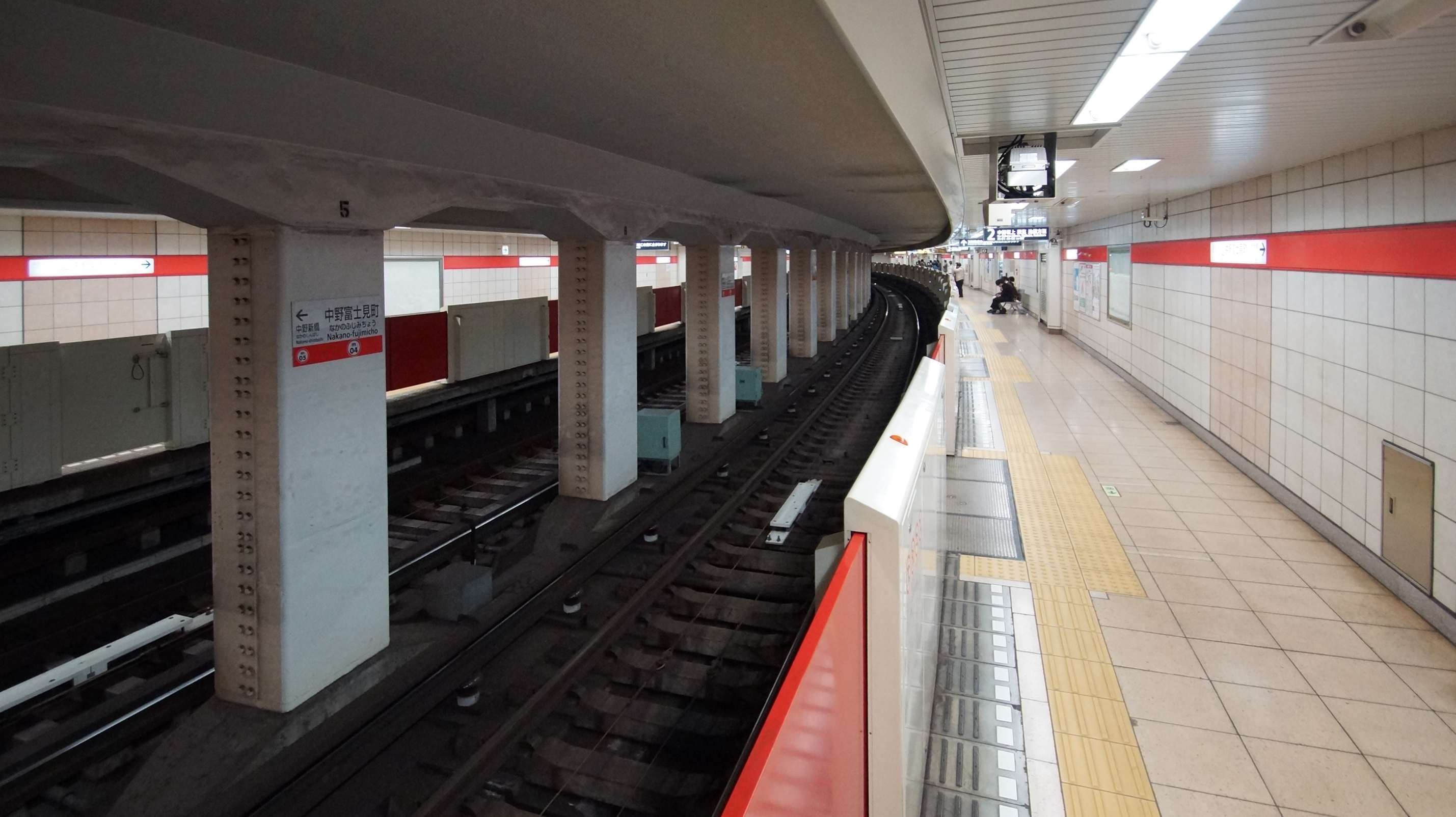
Platform 2, November 2013

== History ==
Nakano-fujimicho Station opened on 8 February 1961.

The station facilities were inherited by Tokyo Metro after the privatization of the Teito Rapid Transit Authority (TRTA) in 2004.

In March 2010, to promote the release of the Cho-Den-O Trilogy of the Kamen Rider movies, a special marking was used on the trains coming to Nakano-fujimichō from Ueno Station, and Den-O's Rina Akiyama greeted 200 fans who rode on the first of those trains.

== Passenger statistics ==
In fiscal 2013, the station was the least used on the Marunouchi Line and the 125th-busiest on the Tokyo Metro network with an average of 18,285 passengers daily.

The passenger statistics for previous years are as shown below.

Fiscal year	Daily average
2011	17,671
2012	17,575
2013	18,285

== Surrounding area ==
- Tokyo Metro Nakano Maintenance Depot, south of the station
- Tokyo Metro Training Center
- Kosei Hospital
- Fuji High School & Fuji Junior High School
- Nakano No. 2 Junior High School
- Nakano Hongo Elementary School
- Kanda River
