= Nakano-shimbashi Station =

Metro station in Tokyo, Japan

Coordinates: 35.692106°N 139.673873°E

Nakano-shimbashi Station 中野新橋駅

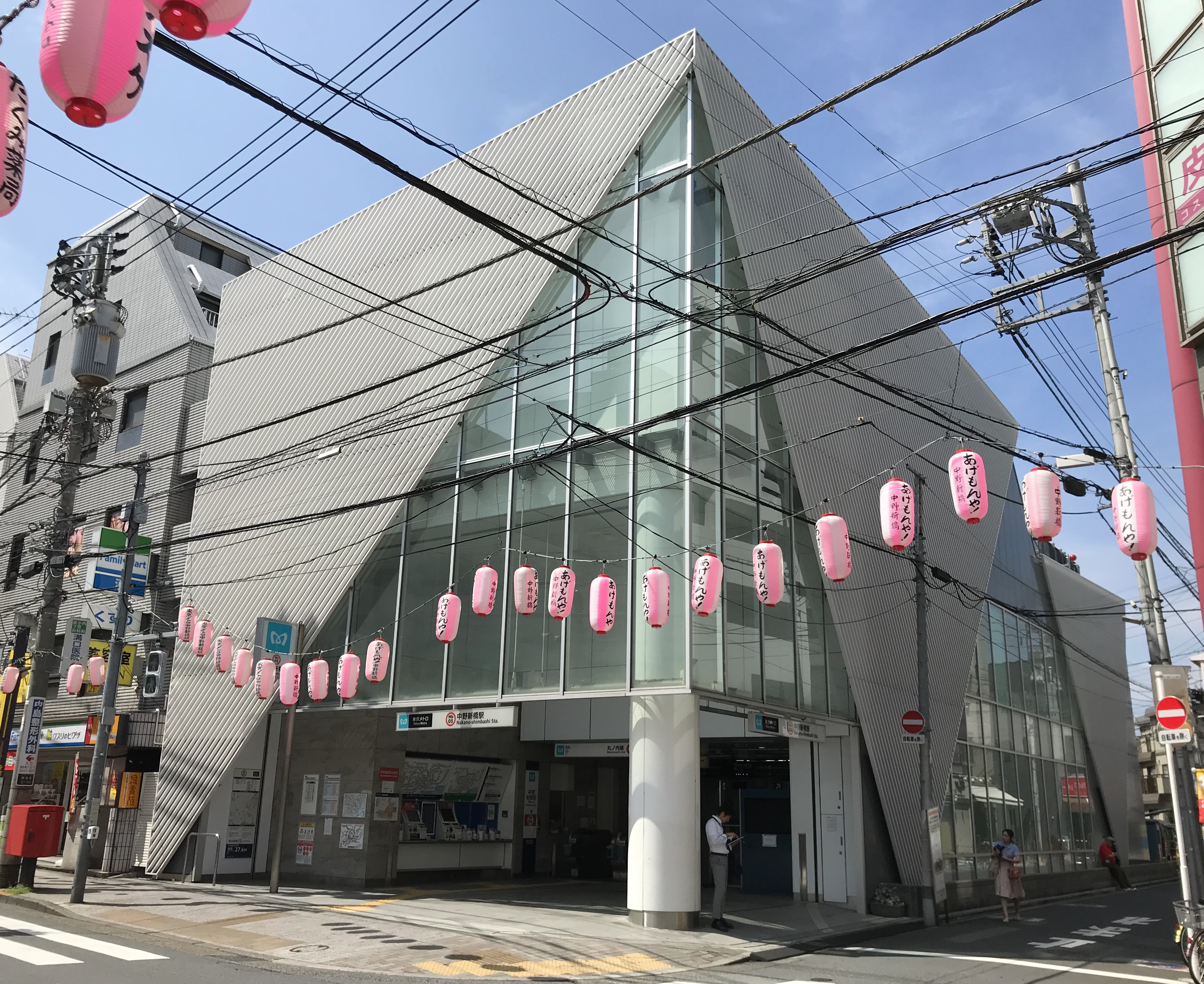
- Station building in August 2019

General information
- Location: 2-26-8 Yayoichō, Nakano, Tokyo （東京都中野区弥生町2-26-8） Japan
- Operator: Tokyo Metro
- Line: Marunouchi Line – (Branch line)
- Platforms: 2 side platforms
- Tracks: 2
- Connections: Bus stop

Construction
- Structure type: Underground

Other information
- Station code: Mb-05

History
- Opened: 8 February 1961; 65 years ago

Passengers
- FY2011: 17,730 daily

Services
Preceding station	Tokyo Metro	Following station
Nakano-fujimicho towards Hōnanchō	Marunouchi Line (Branch line)	Nakano-sakaue Terminus
Location
- Location within Special wards of Tokyo Location within Tokyo Bay and Bōsō Peninsula Location within Tokyo Location within Japan

Nakano-shimbashi Station (中野新橋駅, Nakano-shinbashi-eki) is a subway station numbered Mb-05 on the Tokyo Metro Marunouchi Line in Nakano, Tokyo, Japan, operated by the Tokyo subway operator Tokyo Metro.

== Lines ==
Nakano-shimbashi Station is served by the 3.2 km (2.0 mi) Hōnanchō branch of the Tokyo Metro Marunouchi Line from Nakano-sakaue to Hōnanchō, and is 1.3 km (0.81 mi) from Nakano-sakaue. During the daytime, the station is served by 3-car trains shuttling between Nakano-sakaue and Hōnanchō, but during the morning and evening peaks, the station is also served by some 6-car through trains running between Nakano-fujimicho on the branch line and Ikebukuro at the eastern end of the main line. The station is numbered "Mb-05".

== Station layout ==
The station has two side platforms serving two tracks on the second basement (B2F) level. There is a single entrance at the north end of the station, with the ticket vending machines and ticket barriers located at ground level.

=== Platforms ===
1	Marunouchi Line	for Hōnanchō
2	Marunouchi Line	for Ikebukuro

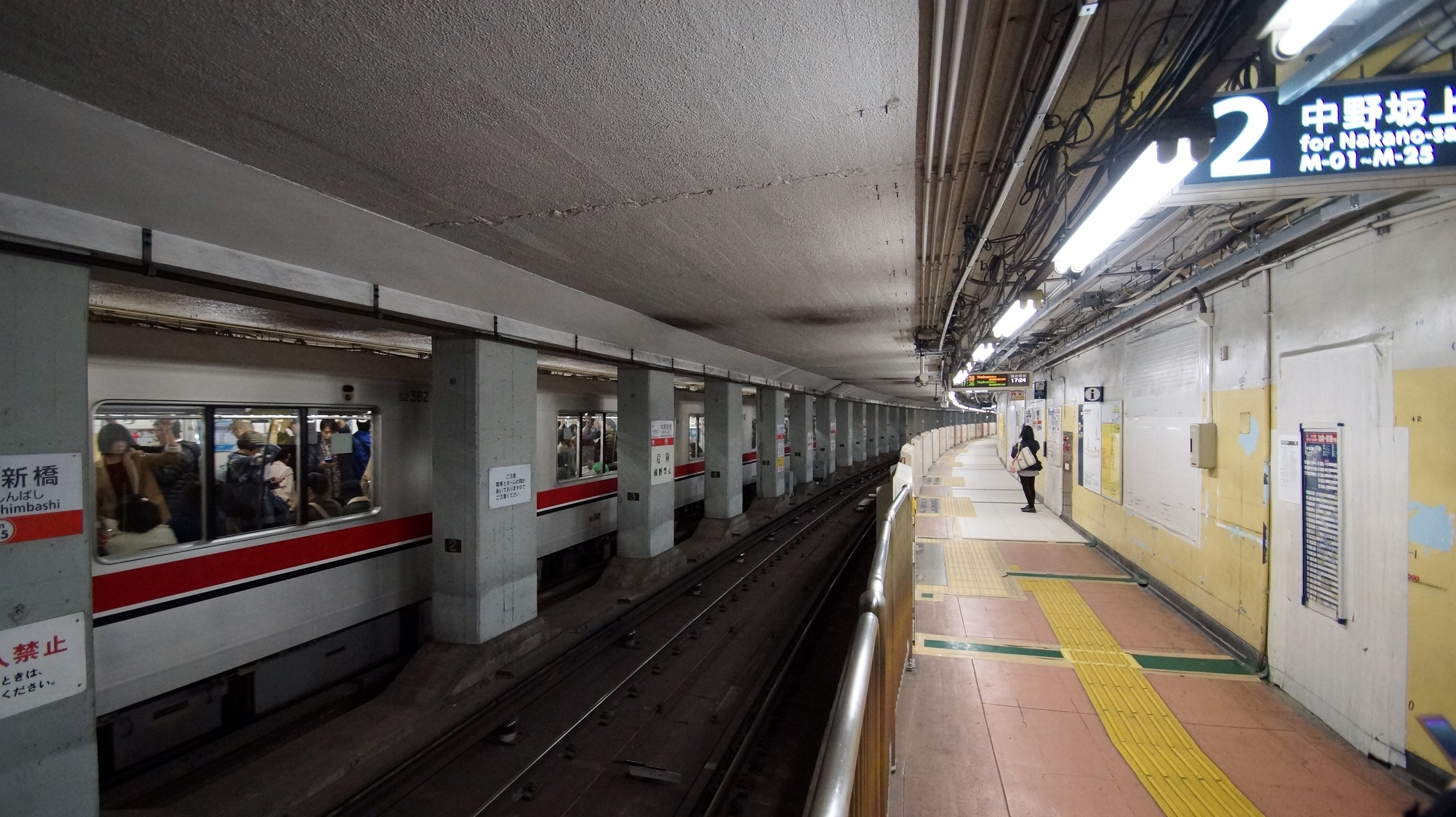
Platform 2 (north end), November 2013

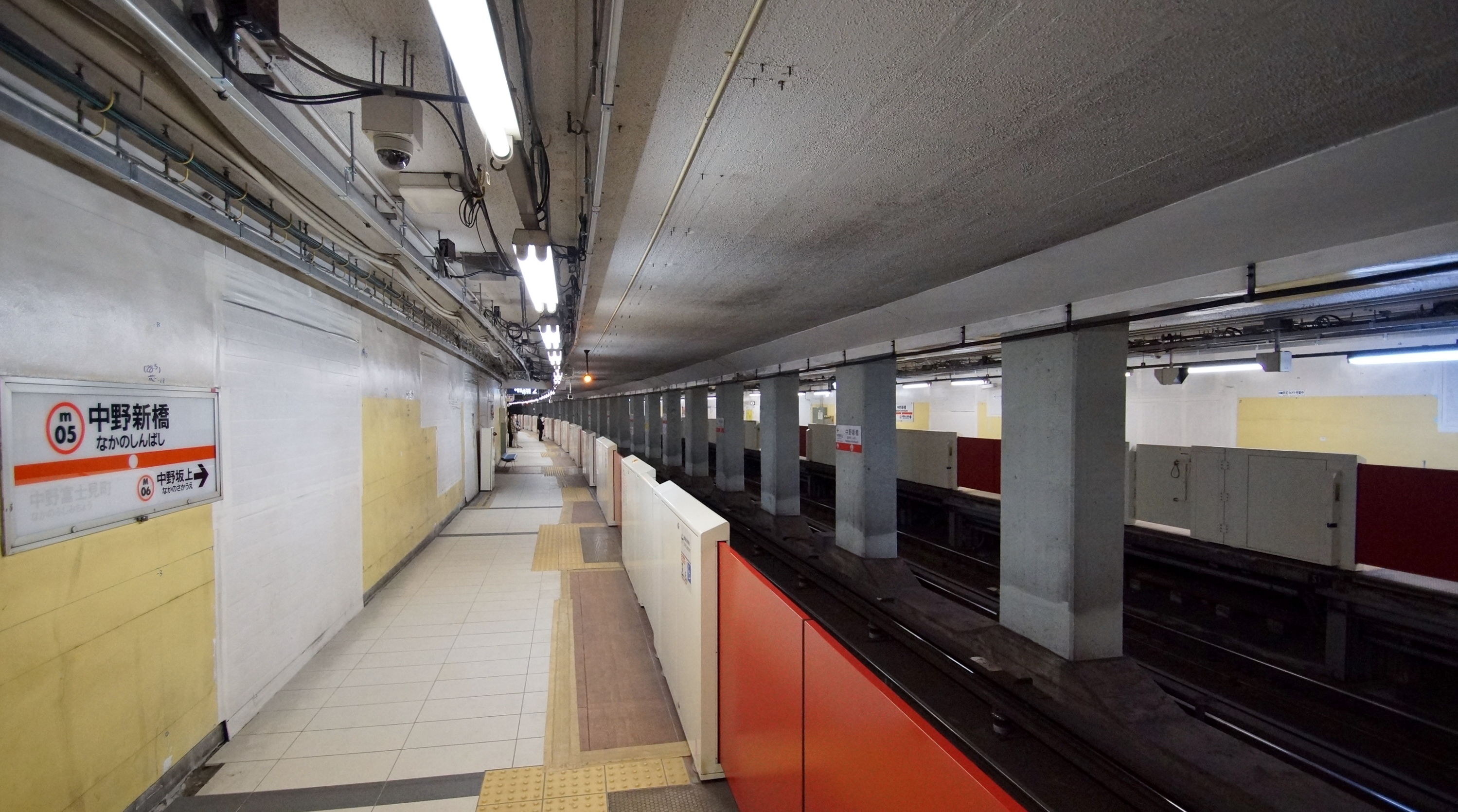
Platform 2 (south end), November 2013

== History ==
Nakano-shimbashi Station opened on 8 February 1961.

The station facilities were inherited by Tokyo Metro after the privatization of the Teito Rapid Transit Authority (TRTA) in 2004.

== Passenger statistics ==
In fiscal 2011, the station was used by an average of 17,730 passengers daily.

== Surrounding area ==
- Tokyo Polytechnic University Nakano campus
- Honcho Library
- Nakano No. 2 Junior High School
- Momozono Elementary School
- Mukodai Elementary School
- Nakano Hongo Elementary School
- Kanda River

== In popular culture ==
The 1967 James Bond film You Only Live Twice used Nakano-Shimbashi station as the location for Tiger Tanaka's private transportation hub.
