= Shin-ōtsuka Station =

Metro station in Tokyo, Japan

Coordinates: 35.725827°N 139.729874°E

Shin-ōtsuka Station 新大塚駅

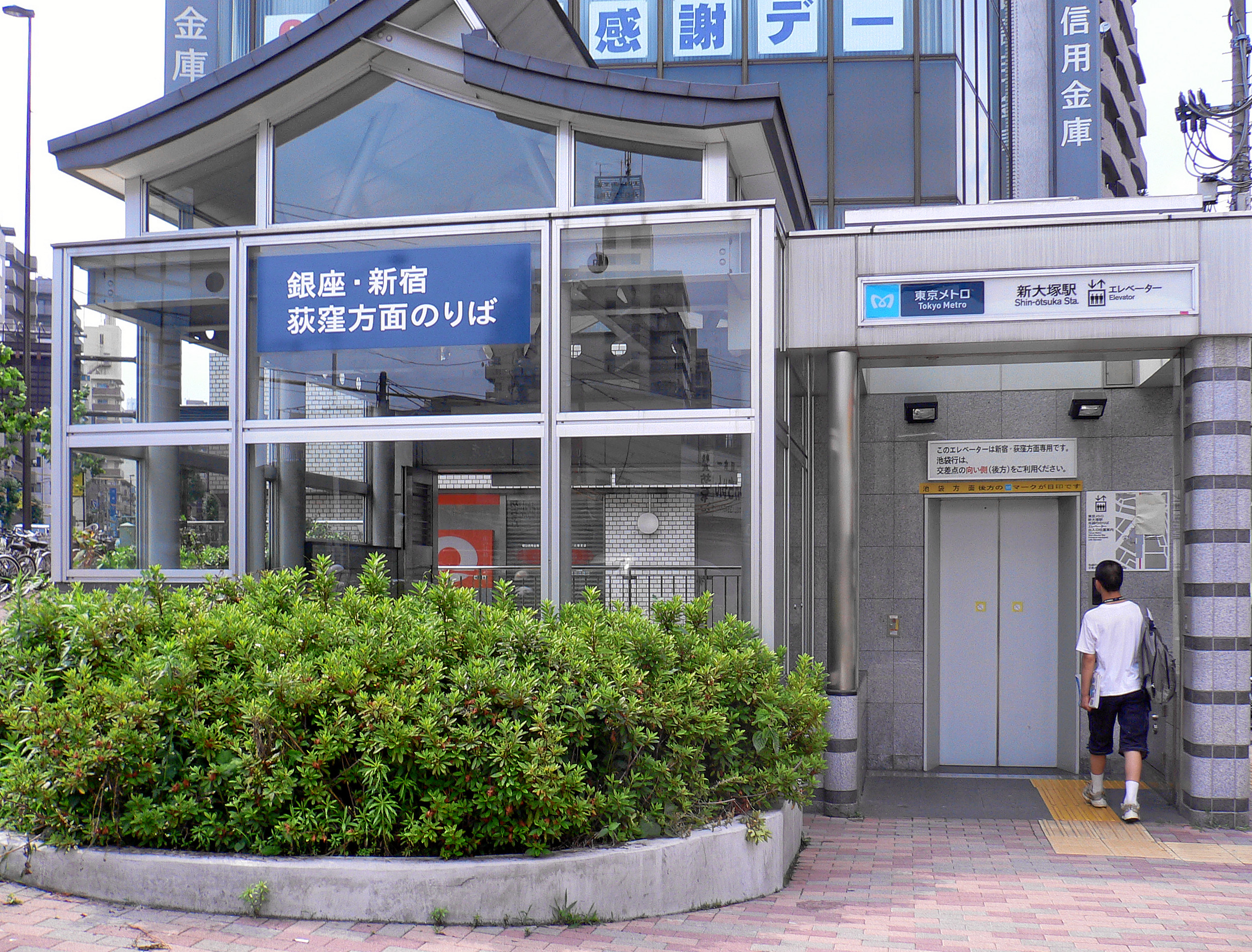
- Entrance for Shin-ōtsuka Station, Ogikubo-bound.

General information
- Location: 4-51-5 Otsuka, Bunkyō, Tokyo; Japan
- Operator: Tokyo Metro
- Line: Marunouchi Line
- Platforms: 2 side platforms
- Tracks: 2

Construction
- Structure type: Underground

Other information
- Station code: M-24

History
- Opened: 20 January 1954; 72 years ago

Services
Preceding station	Tokyo Metro	Following station
Myōgadani towards Ogikubo or Hōnanchō	Marunouchi Line	Ikebukuro Terminus
Location
- Location within Tokyo Yamanote Loop Location within Tokyo wards area Location within Japan

Shin-ōtsuka Station (新大塚駅, Shin-ōtsuka-eki) is a subway station in Bunkyō, Tokyo, Japan, operated by Tokyo Metro on the Tokyo Metro Marunouchi Line. Its station number is M-24. The station opened on 20 January 1954, and consists of two side platforms.

== Lines ==
Shin-ōtsuka Station is served by the Tokyo Metro Marunouchi Line.

== Station Layout ==
The station consists of two underground side platforms, with separate ticket gates for the corresponding platforms. In 2011, a connecting passage was completed to connect the two ticket gates together and the gates for platform 1 was renamed as the North gate and that for platform 2 as the South gate.

=== Platforms ===
1	Marunouchi Line	for Tokyo, Shinjuku, and Ogikubo
2	Marunouchi Line	for Ikebukuro

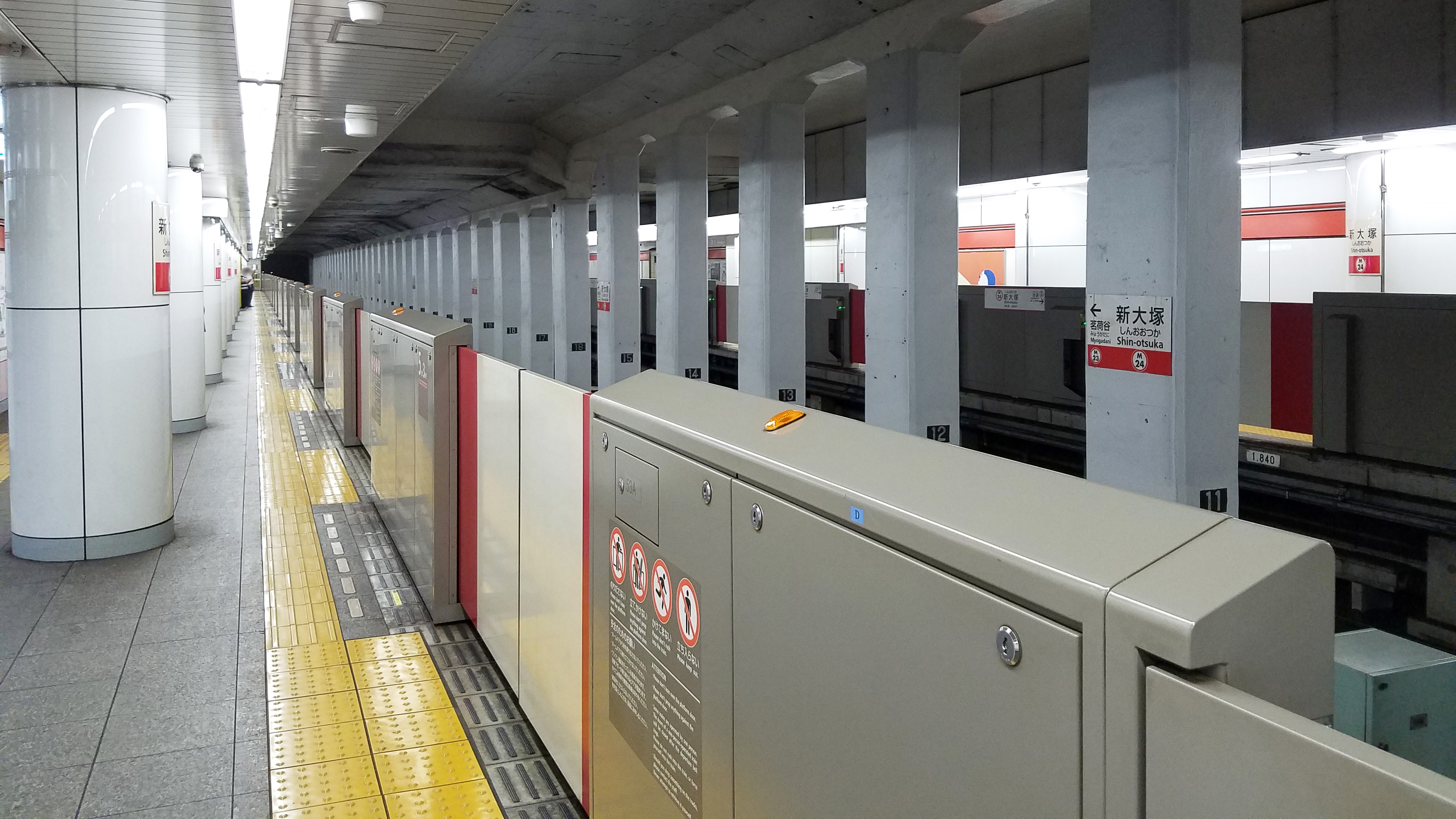
Platforms, 2017

== Surroundings ==
- Ōtsuka Station
- Mukōhara Station
- Asahi Shinkin Bank
- Toho Junior College of Music

== History ==
Shin-otsuka Station opened for revenue service on 20 January 1954.

The station facilities were inherited by Tokyo Metro after the privatization of the Teito Rapid Transit Authority (TRTA) in 2004.

In the 2015 data available from Japan’s Ministry of Land, Infrastructure, Transport and Tourism, Shin-ōtsuka → Myōgadani was one of the train segments among Tokyo's most crowded train lines during rush hour.
