= Higashi-Kōenji Station =

Metro station in Tokyo, Japan

Coordinates: 35°41′52″N 139°39′27″E

Higashi-koenji Station 東高円寺駅

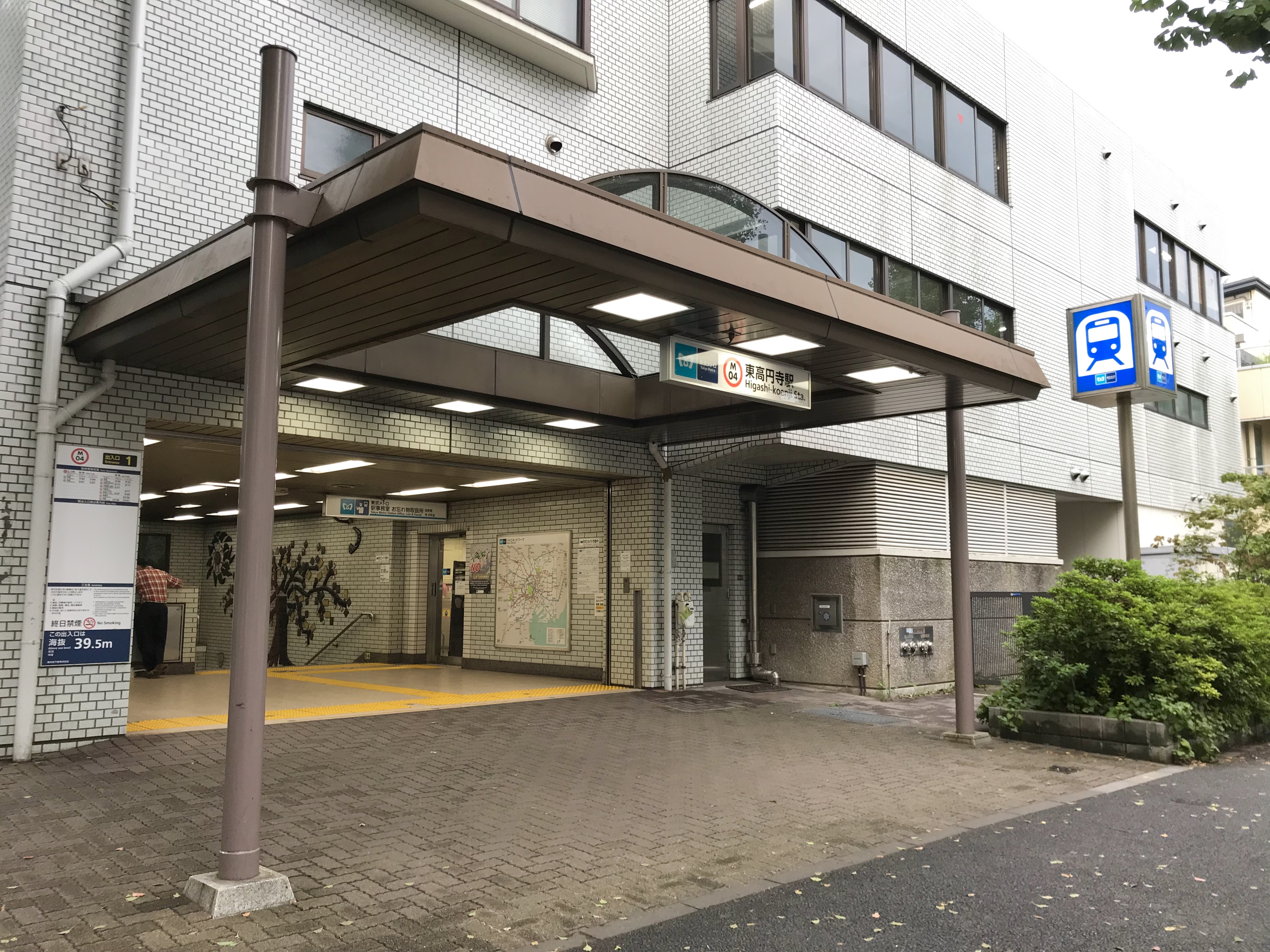
- Station entrance No. 1, August 2019

Japanese name
- Shinjitai: 東高円寺駅
- Kyūjitai: 東高圓寺驛
- Hiragana: ひがしこうえんじえき

General information
- Location: 3-55-42 Wada, Suginami City, Tokyo; Japan
- Operator: Tokyo Metro
- Line: Marunouchi Line
- Platforms: 2 side platforms
- Tracks: 2
- Connections: Bus stop

Construction
- Structure type: Underground

Other information
- Station code: M-04

History
- Opened: 18 September 1964; 61 years ago

Passengers
- FY2011: 30,833 daily

Services
Preceding station	Tokyo Metro	Following station
Shin-Kōenji towards Ogikubo	Marunouchi Line	Shin-Nakano towards Ikebukuro
Location
- Location within Special wards of Tokyo Location within Tokyo Bay and Bōsō Peninsula Location within Tokyo Location within Kanto Area Location within Japan

Higashi-koenji Station (東高円寺駅, Higashi-kōenji-eki) is a subway station numbered M-04 on the Tokyo Metro Marunouchi Line in Suginami, Tokyo, Japan, operated by the Tokyo subway operator Tokyo Metro.

== Lines ==
Higashi-koenji Station is served by the Marunouchi Line from Ogikubo to Ikebukuro, and is 20.6 km from the eastern terminus of the Line at Ikebukuro.

== Station layout ==
The station consists of two underground side platforms serving two tracks on the first basement level. The platforms are served by their own sets of ticket barriers, with access to the surface from Exits for platform 1, and 2 and 3 for platform 2. The two platforms are also linked by an underground passageway.

=== Platforms ===
1	Marunouchi Line	for Ogikubo
2	Marunouchi Line	for Shinjuku, Ginza, and Ikebukuro

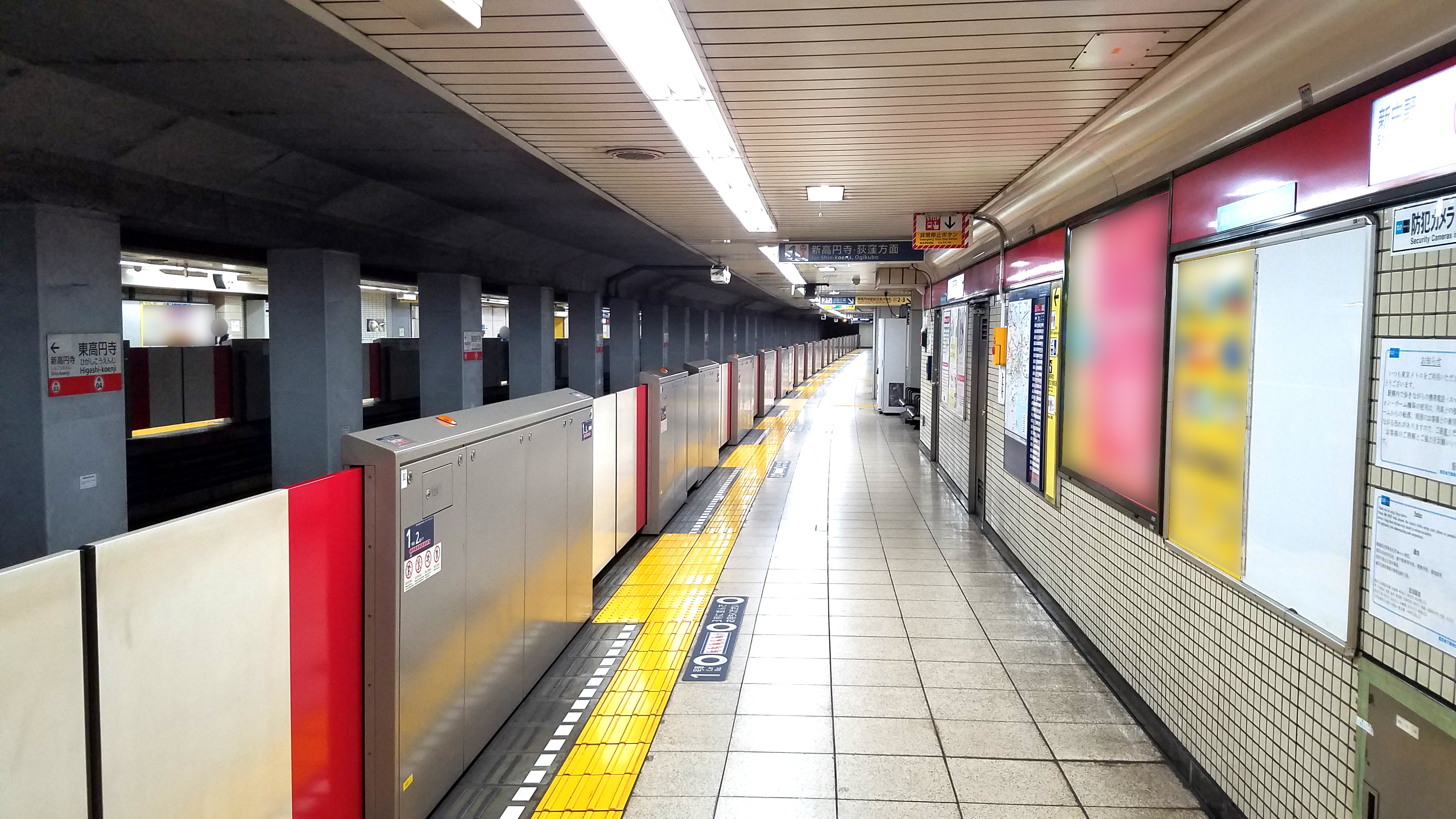
The platforms (Platform 1 on the right, Platform 2 on the left)

== History ==
The station opened on 18 September 1964.

The station facilities were inherited by Tokyo Metro after the privatization of the Teito Rapid Transit Authority (TRTA) in 2004.

== Passenger statistics ==
In fiscal 2011, the station was used by an average of 30,833 passengers daily.

== Surrounding area ==
- Renkōji Temple, where the ashes of Subhas Chandra Bose is preserved.
- Sanshi-no-mori Park
