= Marunouchi Line =

Subway line in Tokyo, Japan

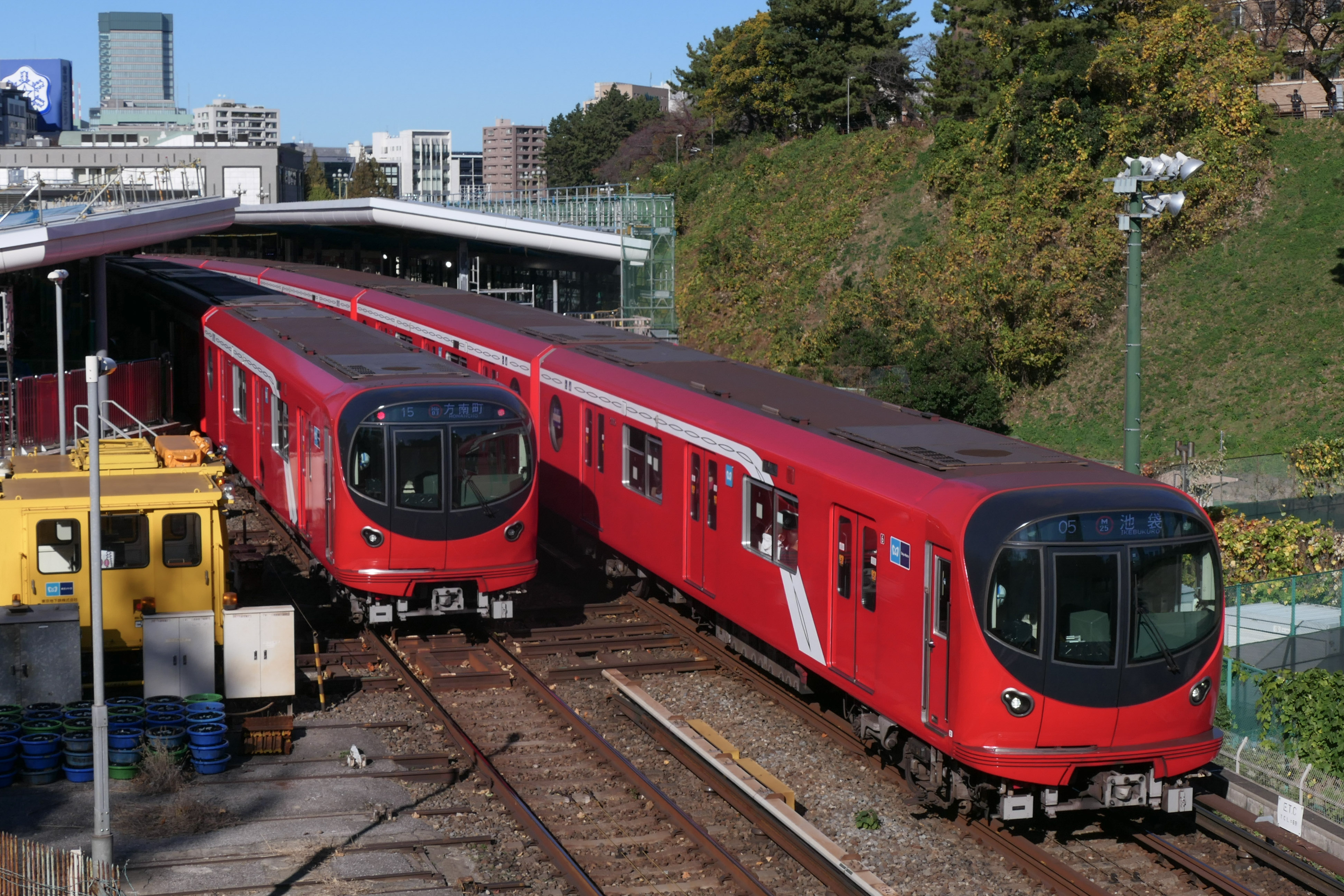
- Marunouchi Line 2000 series trains at Yotsuya Station

Overview
- Other name: Line 4
- Native name: 丸ノ内線
- Status: In service
- Owner: Tokyo Metro Co., Ltd.
- Line number: M/Mb
- Locale: Tokyo
- Termini: Ogikubo (Main) / Honancho (Branch); Ikebukuro (Main) / Nakano-sakaue (Branch)
- Stations: 28 (including branch line)
- Color on map: Red

Service
- Type: Rapid transit
- System: Tokyo subway (Tokyo Metro)
- Operator(s): Tokyo Metro Co., Ltd.
- Depot(s): Koishikawa, Nakano
- Rolling stock: 2000 series
- Daily ridership: 1,159,898 (2017)

History
- Opened: January 20, 1954; 72 years ago
- Last extension: 1962

Technical
- Line length: 27.4 km (17.0 mi) (Main line); 3.2 km (2.0 mi) (Branch Line)
- Num of tracks: 2
- Track gauge: 1,435 mm (4 ft 8 1/2 in) standard gauge
- Minimum radius: 140 m (460 ft) (Main line: Near Ginza); 125 m (410 ft) (Branch Line)
- Electrification: Third rail, 600 V DC
- Operating speed: 75 km/h (47 mph) (Main line); 65 km/h (40 mph) (Branch line)
- Signalling: Tokyo Metro CS-ATC; Communications-based train control
- Maximum incline: 3.5%
Route map
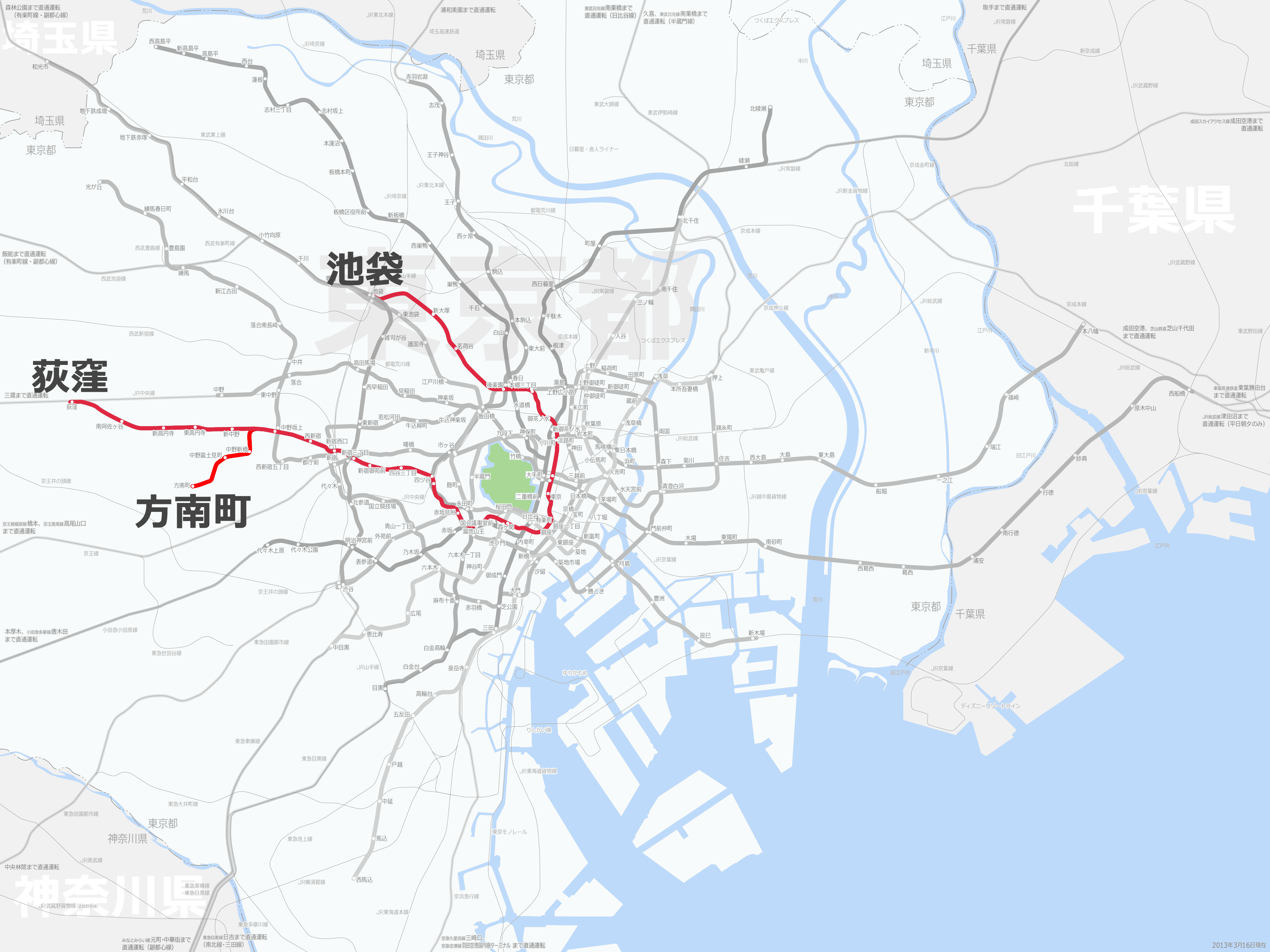

The Marunouchi Line (丸ノ内線, Marunouchi-sen) is a subway line in Tokyo, Japan, operated by Tokyo Metro. The line runs in a U-shape between Ogikubo Station in Suginami and Ikebukuro Station in Toshima, with a branch line between Nakano-Sakaue Station and Hōnanchō Station. The official name is Line 4 Marunouchi Line (4号線丸ノ内線, Yon-gō-sen Marunouchi-sen).

The Marunouchi Line was the fourth subway line constructed in Japan, following the Osaka Municipal Subway Yotsubashi Line.

Its design is similar to that of the Ginza Line, the oldest subway line in Tokyo and in Asia. Both lines are standard gauge and use third rail power, unlike subsequent Tokyo subway lines which use overhead wires and are mostly narrow gauge to accommodate through services with other railway lines.

The line's name is derived from Marunouchi, a district in Chiyoda. It was adopted in 1953 by the Teito Rapid Transit Authority, the operator at the time. Prior to this line, a Tokyo tram line of the same name (opened in 1921) operated above ground between Tokyo and Ōtemachi, along the route of the present line.

On maps, diagrams and signboards, the line is shown using the color red, and its stations are given numbers using the letters "M" for the main line and "Mb" for the branch line.

== Overview ==
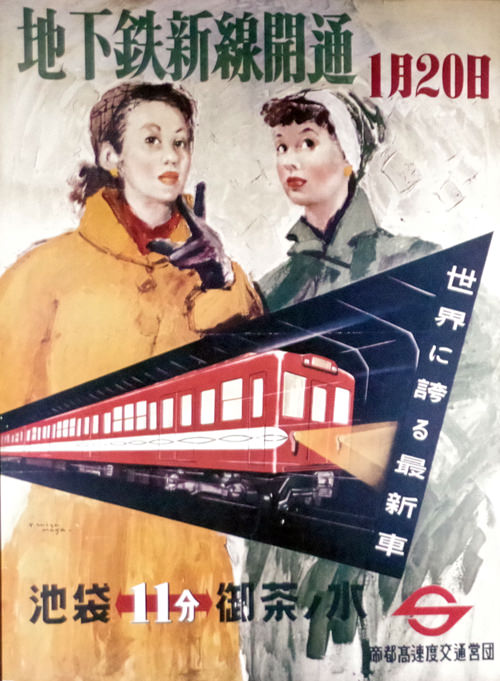
Poster for the Opening of the Marunouchi Line (1954)

The Marunouchi Line is the second line to be built in the city, and the first one constructed after the Second World War. The route is U-shaped, running from Ogikubo Station in the west of the city via the commercial and administrative district of Shinjuku through to the Marunouchi commercial center around Tokyo Station, before turning back and heading to Ikebukuro. Along with the Ginza Line, it is self-enclosed and does not have any through services with other railway lines.

The Marunouchi Line is served by Tokyo Metro 02 series rolling stock in six-car trains on the main line, and mostly three-car trains on the Hōnanchō branch (some six-car trains during peak hours). The main line was the most frequent subway line in Tokyo, with trains once running at intervals of 1 minute 50 seconds during peak hours. In spite of such high-frequency service, according to the 2018 survey by the Ministry of Land, Infrastructure, Transport and Tourism, the Marunouchi Line is one of the most crowded railway lines in Tokyo, running at 169% capacity between Shin-ōtsuka and Myōgadani stations. Its age and relatively short train length has made it one of the most crowded lines in Tokyo, although the 2000 opening of the Toei Ōedo Line has relieved the problem somewhat. In response to crowding, Tokyo Metro upgraded all stations with chest-high platform doors on March 28, 2009, a date on which it also began driver-only operation. The Hōnanchō branch switched to driver-only operation in July 2004.

Due to the age of the Marunouchi Line and the relative shallowness at which it runs, at several points in central Tokyo trains run at or above ground level. These include Yotsuya Station, the Kanda River near Ochanomizu Station, and between Kōrakuen and Myōgadani stations.

On maps, diagrams and signboards, the line is shown using the color red. Its stations are given numbers using the prefix "M"; Hōnanchō branch line stations carry the prefix "Mb", which replaced the previously used lowercase "m" prefix in November 2016.

== History ==
In the five-line subway plan designated by Ministry of Home Affairs Notification No. 56 of 1925 (大正14年内務省告示第56号) after the Great Kanto earthquake of 1923, the Marunouchi Line was outlined as a 20 km (12 mi) underground route connecting “Shinjuku – Yotsuya-mitsuke – Hibiya – Tsukiji – Kakigaracho – Okachimachi – Hongo-sanchome – Takehayacho – Otsuka”.

Tokyo City obtained a route license for Line 4 between Shinjuku and Otsuka on May 16 of the same year planned to begin construction on Line 3 between Shibuya and Sugamo and on Line 5 between Ikebukuro and Susaki. However, due to the city’s substantial public debt, the Ministry of Home Affairs and the Ministry of Finance opposed the project, and construction approval was not granted.

In October 1932, Tokyo City transferred the route licenses for Line 3, running between Shibuya and Sakurada-Hongo (near present-day Nishi-Shimbashi), and for Line 4, connecting Shinjuku and Tsukiji, to Tokyo Rapid Railway. In February 1937, Tokyo Rapid Railway planned a connecting section between Lines 3 and 4 and obtained a route license for the Yotsuya-Mitsuke – Akasaka-Mitsuke segment. Akasaka-Mitsuke Station subsequently opened in 1938.

=== Construction during World War II ===
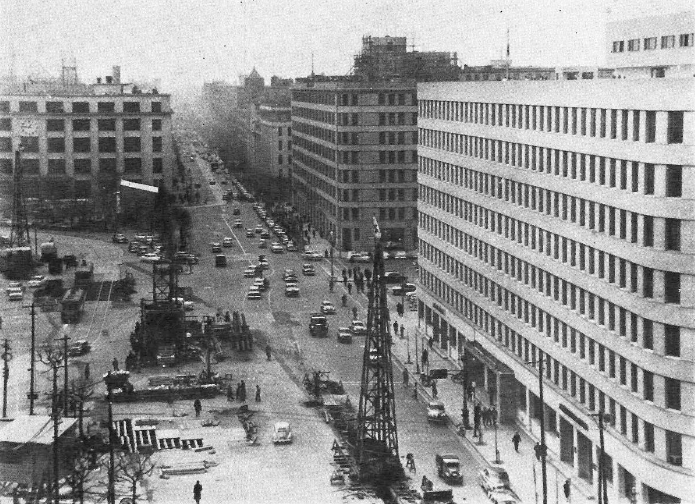
Marunouchi Line under construction around Tokyo Station in the 1950s.

The Teito Rapid Transit Authority (TRTA), commonly known as the Eidan Subway, was established, and on September 1, 1941, all subway route licenses held by Tokyo City, the Tokyo Underground Railway, and the Tokyo Rapid Railway were transferred to the authority in exchange for compensation.

Following the establishment of the Teito Rapid Transit Authority (TRTA), the World War II began on December 8, 1941. Despite wartime constraints, the authority continued planning subway construction, designating Line 4 between Shinjuku and Tokyo as an emergency route. Construction of the Yotsuya-Mitsuke–Akasaka-Mitsuke section was planned for 1942–1945, with the Shinjuku–Yotsuya-Mitsuke and Akasaka-Mitsuke–Tokyo sections scheduled for 1943–1946. Construction of Line 4 between Tokyo and Ikebukuro and of the Gotanda Line (五反田線) between Tsukiji and Gotanda was also planned to begin in 1942, with completion scheduled for after 1947.

On June 5, 1942, a groundbreaking ceremony for the Yotsuya-Mitsuke–Akasaka-Mitsuke section was held and construction began near the Benkei Moat (弁慶濠). Construction was suspended in June 1944 as a result of worsening wartime conditions, including shortages of funds, materials, and labor.

=== Postwar construction ===
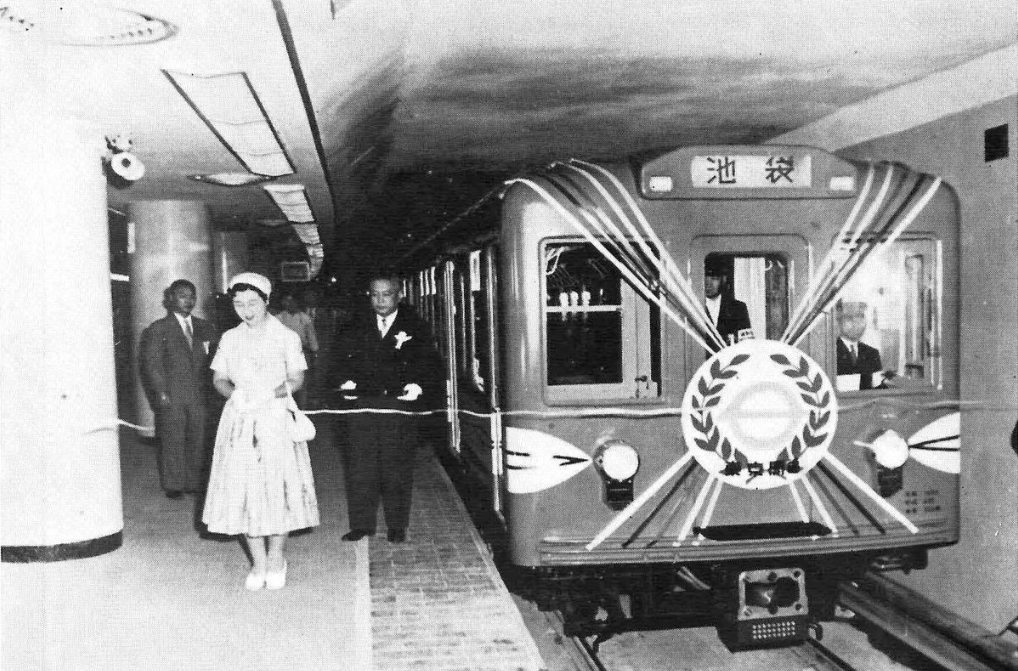
Princess Takamatsu opens the Awajichō–Tokyo section in 1956.

On December 7, 1946, the Marunouchi Line was revised to begin from Nakano-fujimichō to the Mukōhara neighbourhood in Toshima Ward via Kanda and Ikebukuro, for a total length of 22.1 km (13.7 mi).

On March 30, 1951, a groundbreaking ceremony was held at Ikebukuro Station East Exit to begin construction of the initial 7.7 km (4.8 mi) segment of the Marunouchi Line.

The first section was opened between Ikebukuro and Ochanomizu on January 20, 1954. The subsequent progress of the line was as follows:

- Ochanomizu to Awajichō: March 1956
- Awajichō to Tokyo: July 1956
- Tokyo to Nishi-Ginza (now Ginza): December 1957
- Nishi-Ginza to Kasumigaseki: October 1958
- Kasumigaseki to Shinjuku: March 1959
- Shinjuku to Shin-Nakano/Nakano-Fujimichō (not Nishi-Shinjuku): February 1961
- Shin-Nakano to Minami-Asagaya (not Higashi-Kōenji): November 1961
- Minami-Asagaya to Ogikubo: January 23, 1962
- Nakano-Fujimichō to Hōnanchō: March 23, 1962
- Nishi-Ginza becomes part of Ginza when Hibiya Line reaches there: August 1964
- Higashi-Kōenji opens (between Shin-Nakano and Shin-Kōenji): September 1964
- Nishi-Shinjuku opens (between Shinjuku and Nakano-Sakaue) May 1996.

The Marunouchi Line was one of the lines targeted in the Aum sarin gas attack on March 20, 1995. A plan to extend the Marunouchi Line from Ogikubo to Asaka City in Saitama Prefecture was rejected in the late 1990s.

The line, stations, rolling stock, and related facilities were inherited by Tokyo Metro after the privatization of the Teito Rapid Transit Authority (TRTA) in 2004.

Automatic train control (ATC) was activated on the Marunouchi Line on February 27, 1998, which allowed for an increase in the maximum operating speed limit from 65 km/h (40 mph) to 75 km/h (47 mph). This was followed by train automatic stopping controller (TASC) which was introduced in November 2002, along with automatic train operation (ATO) which was introduced on the main segment of the Marunouchi Line on December 27, 2008. The platform-edge doors at Hōnanchō Station, the terminus of the Hōnanchō Branch, were lengthened to allow six-car trains to use the station, with work starting in 2013, which enabled through trains to and from Ikebukuro to start operating all the way to Hōnanchō from fiscal 2017.

With the start of the revised timetable on December 7, 2024, the Marunouchi Line became the first subway line in Japan to adopt communications-based train control (CBTC) signalling. The new system allows for shorter intervals between trains and improved delay recovery.

== Station list ==
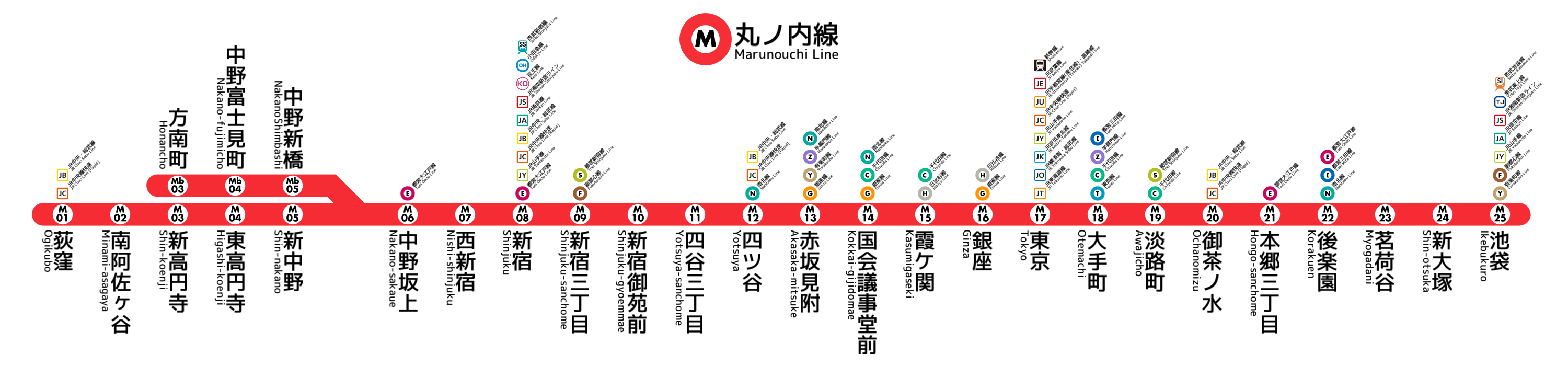
List of Marunouchi Line stations

- All stations are located in Tokyo.
- Some trains leave the main line at Nakano-sakaue (M-06) for the Marunouchi Branch Line to Hōnanchō.

=== Main Line ===
No.	Station	Japanese	Distance (km)		Transfers	Location
No.	Station	Japanese	Between stations	From Ogikubo	Transfers	Location
M-01	Ogikubo	荻窪	–	0.0	Chūō Line (JC09); Chūō–Sōbu Line (JB04)	Suginami
M-02	Minami-asagaya	南阿佐ケ谷	1.5	1.5		Suginami
M-03	Shin-koenji	新高円寺	1.2	2.7		Suginami
M-04	Higashi-koenji	東高円寺	0.9	3.6		Suginami
M-05	Shin-nakano	新中野	1.0	4.6		Nakano
M-06	Nakano-sakaue	中野坂上	1.1	5.7	(for Hōnanchō; some trains through to Hōnanchō); Ōedo Line (E-30)	Nakano
M-07	Nishi-Shinjuku	西新宿	1.1	6.8		Shinjuku
M-08	Shinjuku	新宿	0.8	7.6	Shinjuku Line (S-01); Ōedo Line (E-27, Shinjuku-nishiguchi: E-01); Chūō Line (JC05); Chūō–Sōbu Line (JB10); Yamanote Line (JY17); Shōnan–Shinjuku Line (JS20); Saikyō Line (JA11); Keiō Line (KO01); Keiō New Line (KO01); Odawara Line (OH01); Shinjuku Line (Seibu-Shinjuku: SS01)	Shinjuku
M-09	Shinjuku-sanchōme	新宿三丁目	0.3	7.9	Fukutoshin Line (F-13); Shinjuku Line (S-02)	Shinjuku
M-10	Shinjuku-gyoemmae	新宿御苑前	0.7	8.6		Shinjuku
M-11	Yotsuya-sanchōme	四谷三丁目	0.9	9.5		Shinjuku
M-12	Yotsuya	四ツ谷	1.0	10.5	Namboku Line (N-08); Chūō Line (JC04); Chūō–Sōbu Line (JB14)	Shinjuku
M-13	Akasaka-mitsuke	赤坂見附	1.3	11.8	Ginza Line (G-05); Nagatacho: Yūrakuchō Line (Y-16) Hanzōmon Line (Z-04) Namboku Line (N-07)	Minato
M-14	Kokkai-gijidō-mae	国会議事堂前	0.9	12.7	Chiyoda Line (C-07); Tameike-sanno: Ginza Line (G-06) Namboku Line (N-06)	Chiyoda
M-15	Kasumigaseki	霞ケ関	0.7	13.4	Hibiya Line (H-07); Chiyoda Line (C-08)	Chiyoda
M-16	Ginza	銀座	1.0	14.4	Ginza Line (G-09); Hibiya Line (H-09); Yūrakuchō Line (Ginza-itchome: Y-19); Underground passage to Higashi-ginza, Hibiya, Yūrakuchō stations	Chūō
M-17	Tokyo	東京	1.1	15.5	Tōhoku Shinkansen (Hokkaido, Akita, Yamagata); Jōetsu Shinkansen; Hokuriku Shinkansen; Tokaido Shinkansen; Yamanote Line (JY01); Keihin–Tōhoku Line (JK26); Chūō Line (JC01); Tōkaidō Line (JT01); Ueno–Tokyo Line (JU01); Yokosuka Line/Sōbu Line (JO19); Keiyō Line (JE01)	Chiyoda
M-18	Ōtemachi	大手町	0.6	16.1	Tōzai Line (T-09); Chiyoda Line (C-11); Hanzōmon Line (Z-08); Mita Line (I-09)	Chiyoda
M-19	Awajichō	淡路町	0.9	17.0	Ginza Line (Kanda: G-13); Chiyoda Line (Shin-ochanomizu: C-12); Shinjuku Line (Ogawamachi: S-07)	Chiyoda
M-20	Ochanomizu	御茶ノ水	0.8	17.8	Chūō Line (JC03); Chūō–Sōbu Line (JB18)	Bunkyō
M-21	Hongō-sanchōme	本郷三丁目	0.8	18.6	Ōedo Line (E-08)	Bunkyō
M-22	Kōrakuen	後楽園	0.8	19.4	Namboku Line (N-11); Kasuga: Mita Line (I-12) Ōedo Line (E-07)	Bunkyō
M-23	Myōgadani	茗荷谷	1.8	21.2		Bunkyō
M-24	Shin-ōtsuka	新大塚	1.2	22.4		Bunkyō
M-25	Ikebukuro	池袋	1.8	24.2	Yūrakuchō Line (Y-09); Fukutoshin Line (F-09); Yamanote Line (JY13); Saikyō Line (JA12); Shōnan–Shinjuku Line (JS21); Ikebukuro Line (SI01); Tojo Line (TJ01)	Toshima

=== Branch Line (Honancho Line) ===
No.	Station	Japanese	Distance (km)		Transfers	Location
No.	Station	Japanese	Between stations	Total	Transfers	Location
Mb-03	Hōnanchō	方南町	–	0.0		Suginami
Mb-04	Nakano-fujimichō	中野富士見町	1.3	1.3		Nakano
Mb-05	Nakano-shimbashi	中野新橋	0.6	1.9		Nakano
M-06	Nakano-sakaue	中野坂上	1.3	3.2	(for Ikebukuro and Ogikubo; some trains through); Ōedo Line (E-30)	Nakano

=== Ridership ===
Average daily ridership
Year	Ridership
1956	99,814
1960	472,301
1965	830,534
1970	1,229,230
1975	1,016,482
1980	904,704
1985	959,967
1990	1,005,008
1995	937,704
2000	887,301
2005	853,921
2010	847,816
2015	978,443
2020	694,539
2024	964,991
Source: Tokyo Metropolitan Government

== Rolling stock ==
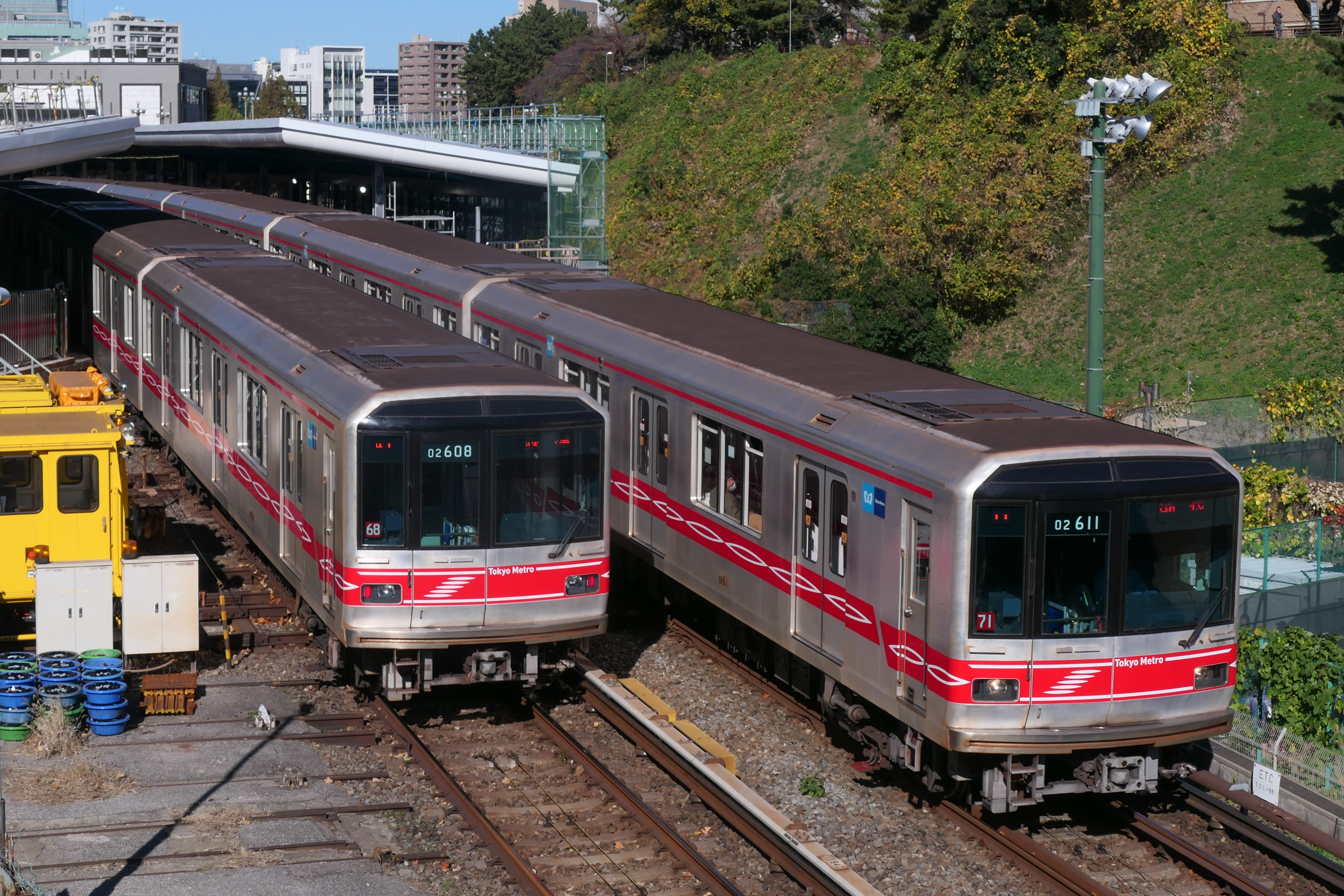
Two 02 series EMUs at Yotsuya Station in November 2020

Marunouchi Line services were operated using a fleet of 53 Tokyo Metro 02 series six-car EMUs in service since 1988 together with six three-car sets used on Hōnanchō branch services until September 2022. All trains are based at Koishikawa and Nakano Depots.

A fleet of 53 new Tokyo Metro 2000 series six-car trains was scheduled to be introduced from fiscal 2018, replacing the 02 series trains by fiscal 2025. On February 23, 2019, the 2000 series started operation.

=== Former ===
- TRTA 500 series/TRTA 300/TRTA 400 series/TRTA 500 series/TRTA 900 series (from 1954 until 1996, later sold and exported for use on Line B of the Buenos Aires Underground)
- TRTA 100 series (from 1962 until 1968, transferred from Ginza Line, used for Hōnanchō branch only)
- TRTA 2000 series (from 1968 until 1993, used for Hōnanchō branch only)
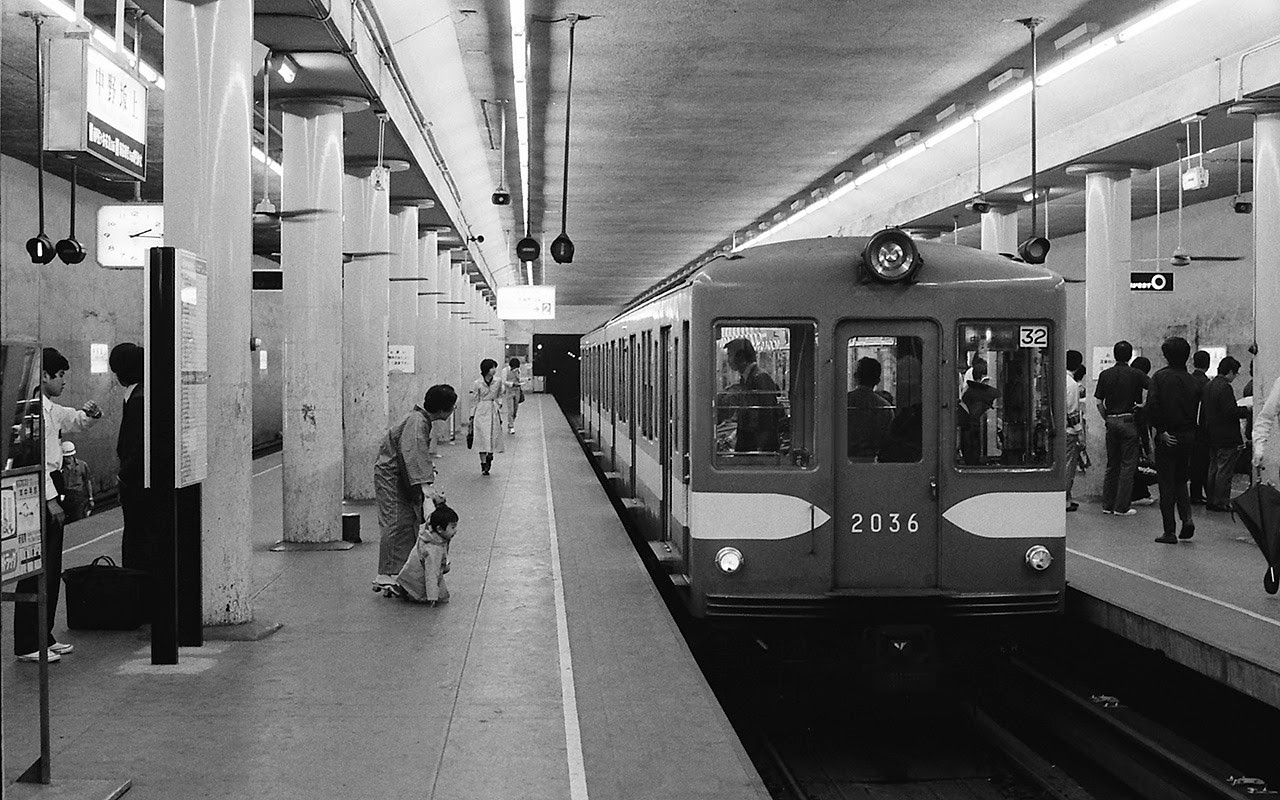
A Hōnanchō branch 2000 series train in 1977
