= Shin-nakano Station =

Metro station in Tokyo, Japan

Coordinates: 35.697469°N 139.669071°E

Shin-nakano Station 新中野駅

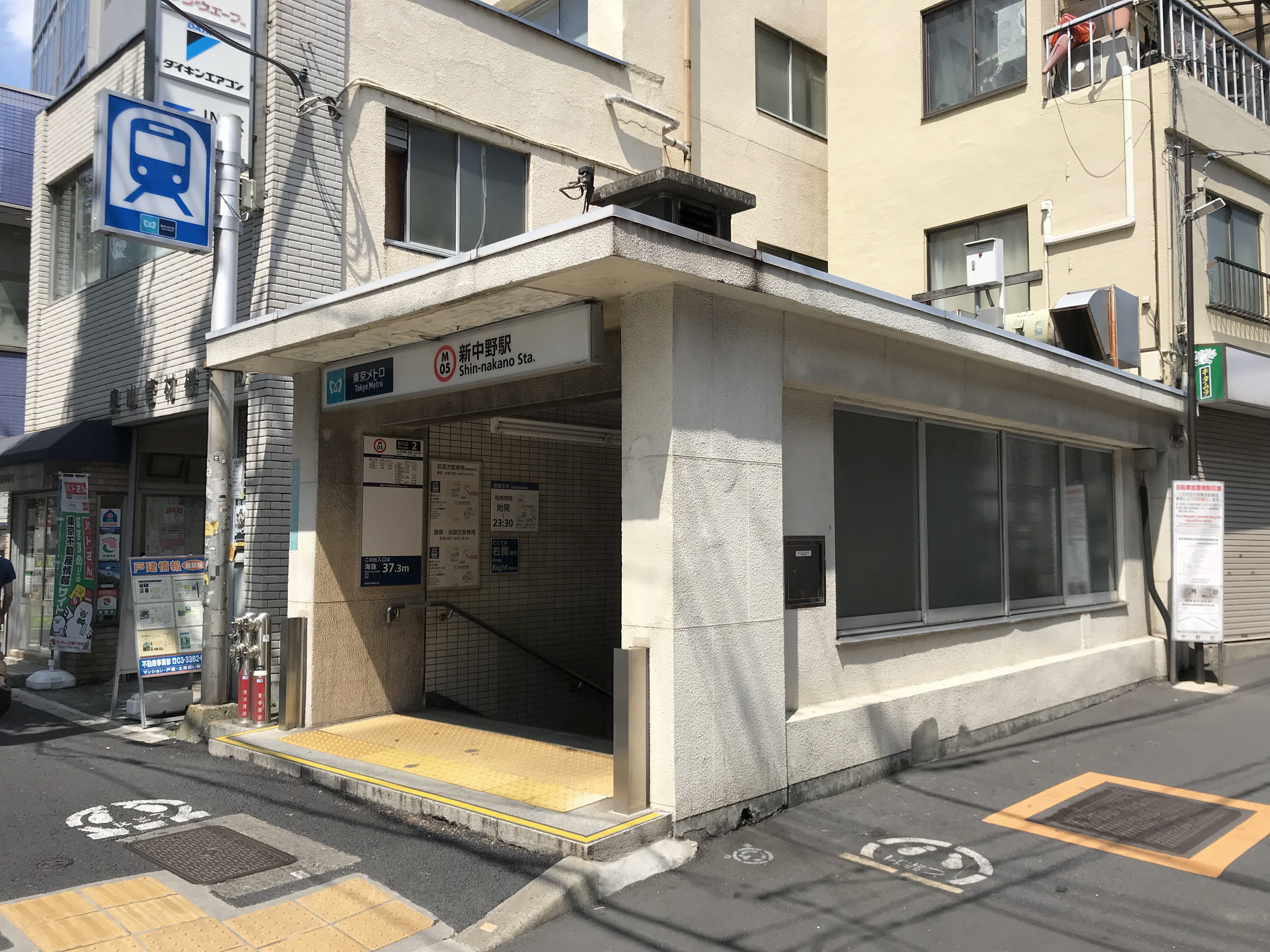
- Entrance No. 1, August 2019

General information
- Location: 4-2-15 Chūō, Nakano, Tokyo （東京都中野区中央4-2-15） Japan
- Operator: Tokyo Metro
- Line: Marunouchi Line
- Platforms: 2 side platforms
- Tracks: 2
- Connections: Bus stop

Construction
- Structure type: Underground

Other information
- Station code: M-05

History
- Opened: 8 February 1961; 65 years ago

Passengers
- FY2011: 31,125 daily

Services
Preceding station	Tokyo Metro	Following station
Higashi-Kōenji towards Ogikubo	Marunouchi Line	Nakano-sakaue towards Ikebukuro
Location
- Location within Special wards of Tokyo Location within Tokyo Bay and Bōsō Peninsula Location within Tokyo Location within Japan

Shin-nakano Station (新中野駅, Shin-nakano-eki) is a subway station on the Tokyo Metro Marunouchi Line in Nakano, Tokyo, Japan, operated by the Tokyo subway operator Tokyo Metro. It is numbered M-05.

== Lines ==
Shin-nakano Station is served by the Tokyo Metro Marunouchi Line from Ogikubo to Ikebukuro, and is 19.6 km from the eastern terminus of the Line at Ikebukuro. It is numbered "M-05".

== Station layout ==
The station consists of two underground side platforms serving two tracks on the first basement level. The platforms each have sets of ticket barriers at either end. They are also linked by an underground passageway.

=== Platforms ===
1	Marunouchi Line	for Ogikubo
2	Marunouchi Line	for Shinjuku, Ginza, and Ikebukuro

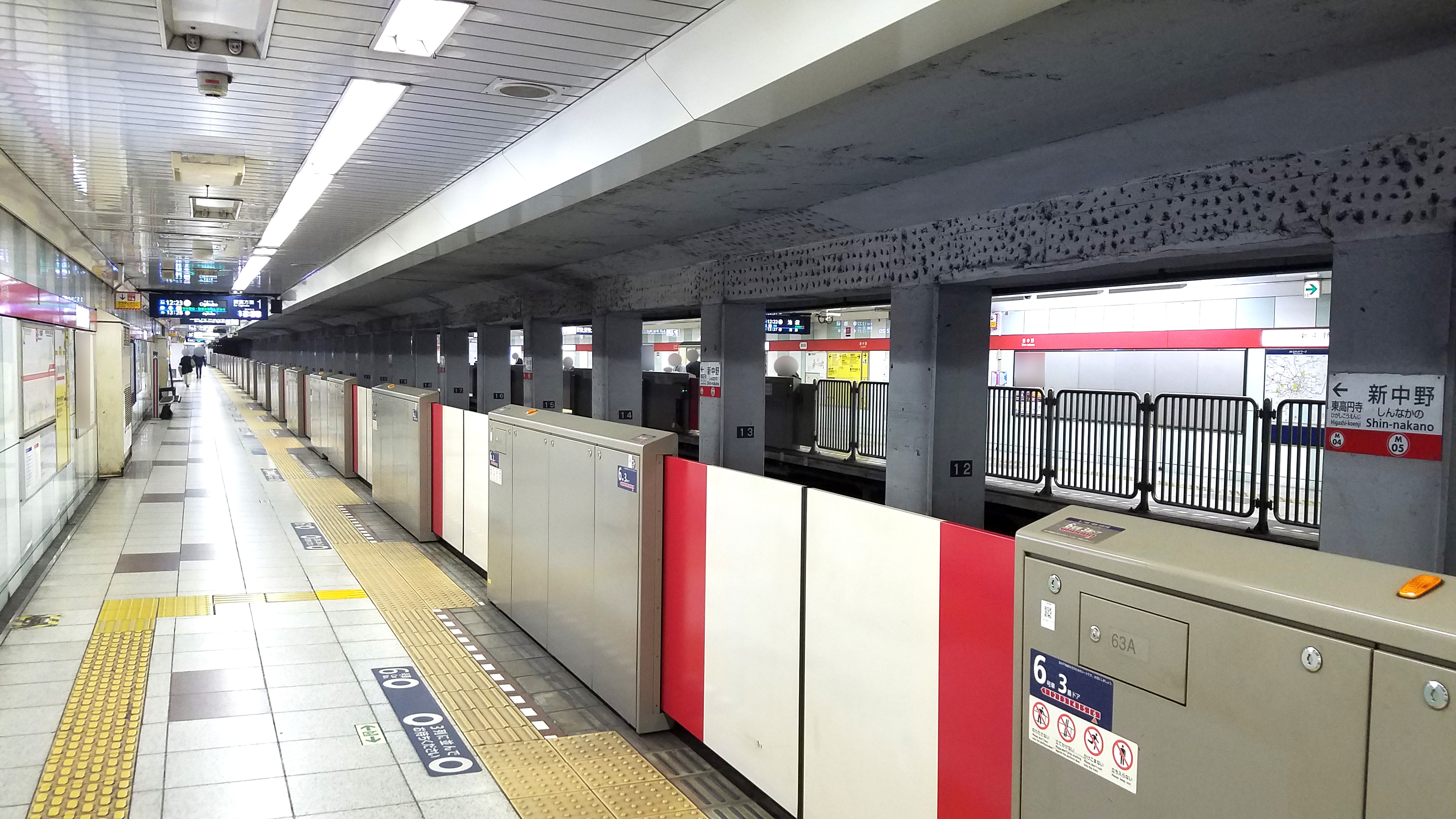
Platform 1, March 2022

== History ==
The station opened on February 8, 1961.

The station facilities were inherited by Tokyo Metro after the privatization of the Teito Rapid Transit Authority (TRTA) in 2004.

== Passenger statistics ==
In fiscal 2025, the station was used by an average of 34,323 passengers daily, including entering and exiting passengers.

== Surrounding area ==
- Sugiyama Park
- Chūō Park
