= Shin-koenji Station =

Metro station in Tokyo, Japan

Coordinates: 35.697815°N 139.648402°E

Shin-koenji Station 新高円寺駅

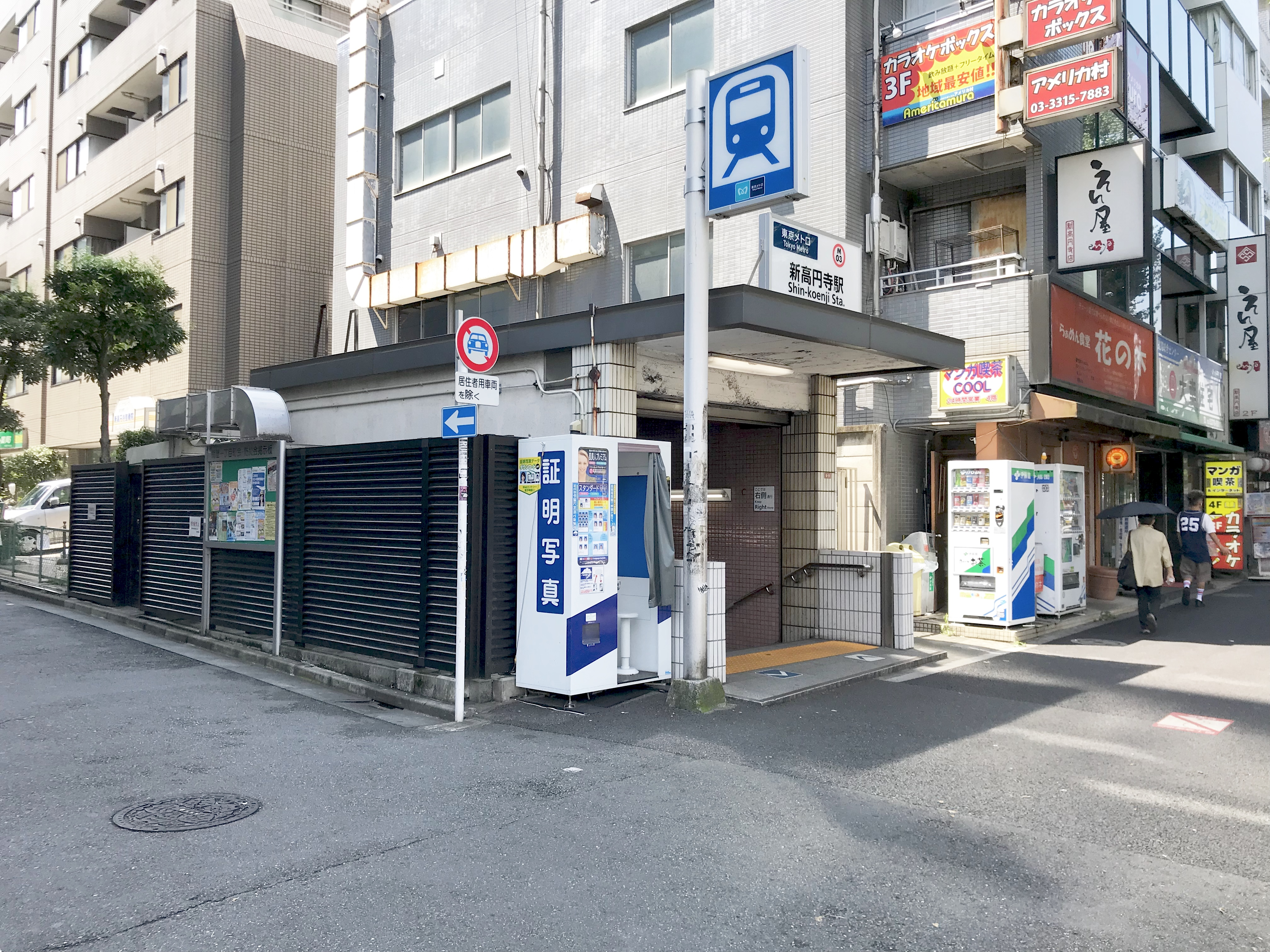
- Entrance No. 1 in August 2019

Japanese name
- Shinjitai: 新高円寺駅
- Kyūjitai: 新高圓寺驛
- Hiragana: しんこうえんじえき

General information
- Location: 2-20-1 Kōenji-minami, Suginami City, Tokyo; Japan
- Operator: Tokyo Metro
- Line: Marunouchi Line
- Platforms: 2 side platforms
- Tracks: 2
- Connections: Bus stop

Construction
- Structure type: Underground

Other information
- Station code: M-03

History
- Opened: 1 November 1961; 64 years ago

Passengers
- FY2011: 32,336 daily

Services
Preceding station	Tokyo Metro	Following station
Minami-asagaya towards Ogikubo	Marunouchi Line	Higashi-Kōenji towards Ikebukuro
Location
- Location within Special wards of Tokyo Location within Tokyo Bay and Bōsō Peninsula Location within Tokyo Location within Japan

Shin-koenji Station (新高円寺駅, Shin-kōenji-eki) is a subway station on the Tokyo Metro Marunouchi Line in Suginami, Tokyo, Japan, operated by the Tokyo subway operator Tokyo Metro.

== Lines ==
Shin-koenji Station is served by the Tokyo Metro Marunouchi Line from Ogikubo to Ikebukuro, and is 21.5 km from the eastern terminus of the Line at Ikebukuro. It is numbered "M-03".

== Station layout ==
The station consists of two underground side platforms serving two tracks on the first basement level. The platforms are served by their own sets of ticket barriers, with access to the surface from Exits 1 and 2 (from platforms 1 and 2 respectively). The two platforms are also linked by an underground passageway.

=== Platforms ===
1	Marunouchi Line	for Ogikubo
2	Marunouchi Line	for Shinjuku, Ginza, and Ikebukuro

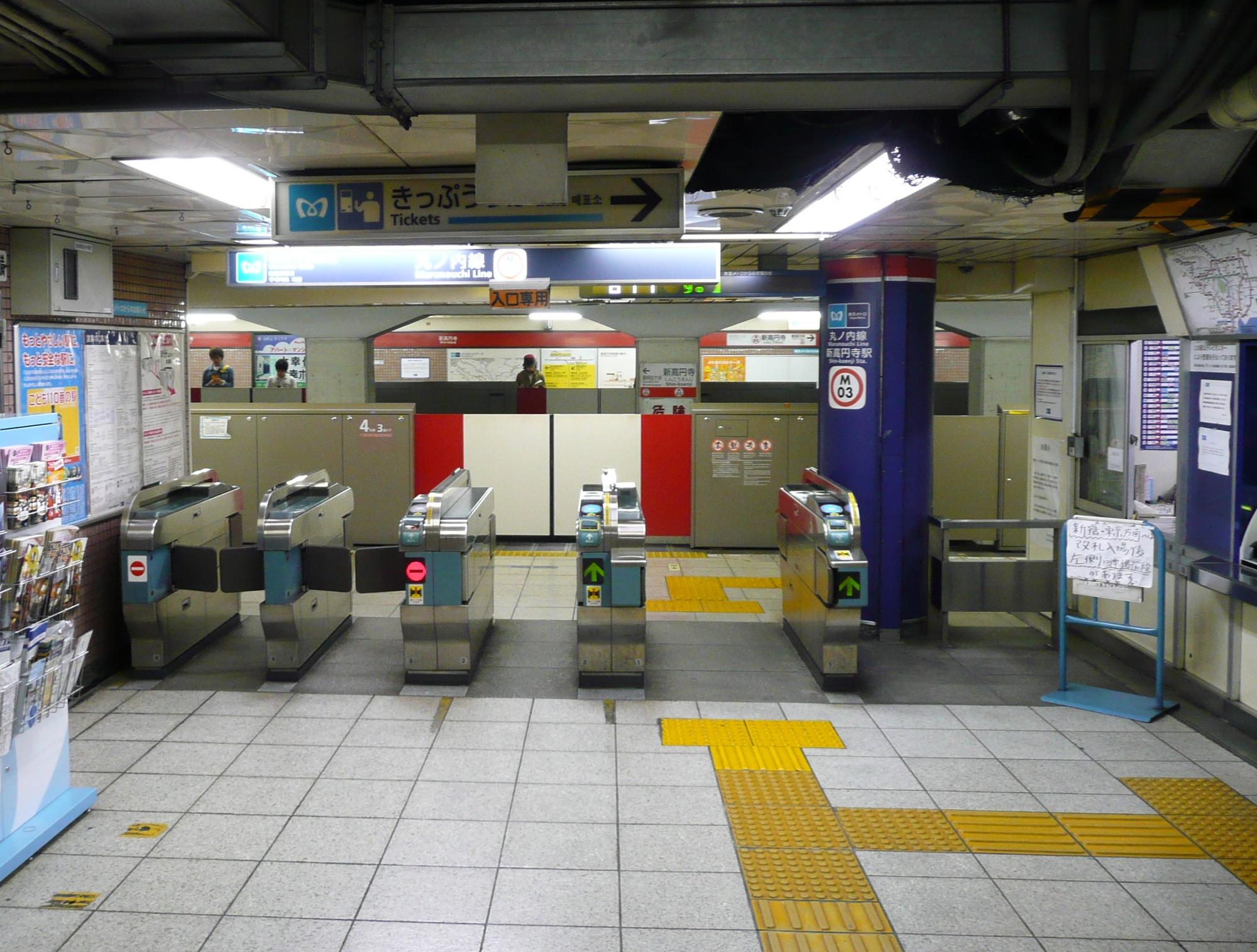
The ticket barriers leading to platform 1 in October 2011

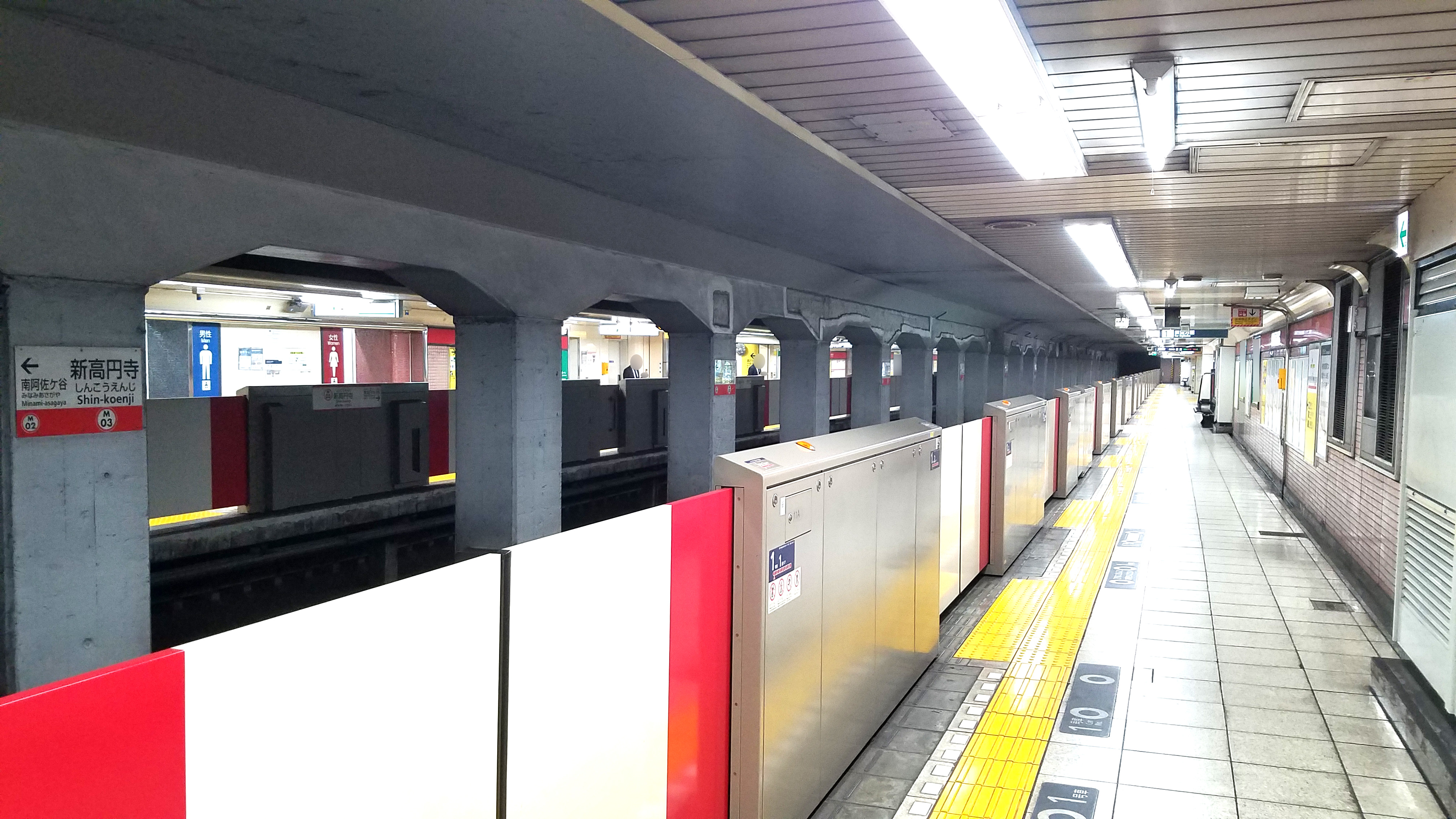
Marunouchi Line platforms in March 2022

== History ==
The station was opened on 1 November 1961.

The station facilities were inherited by Tokyo Metro after the privatization of the Teito Rapid Transit Authority (TRTA) in 2004.

== Passenger statistics ==
In fiscal 2011, the station was used by an average of 32,336 passengers daily.

== Surrounding area ==
Its two exits are on either side of Ōme Kaidō Avenue, a major road connecting Shinjuku to the western suburbs of Tokyo. The north exit is adjacent to Look Shōtengai, a pedestrian shopping street popular for its used clothing and music stores.
