= Nakano-sakaue Station =

Metro station in Tokyo, Japan

Nakano-sakaue Station 中野坂上駅

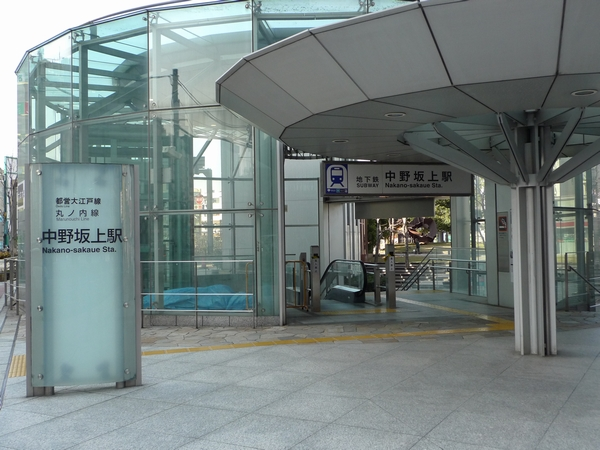
- Entrance A1 in March 2011

General information
- Location: 2-48-2 Honmachi (Tokyo Metro); 2-28 Chuo (Toei Subway); Nakano City, Tokyo; Japan
- Coordinates: 35.696985°N 139.682804°E
- Operator: Tokyo Metro; Toei Subway
- Lines: Marunouchi Line; Ōedo Line
- Platforms: 3 island platforms (2 Marunouchi Line, 1 Ōedo Line)
- Tracks: 5 (3 Marunouchi Line, 2 Ōedo Line)
- Connections: Bus stop

Construction
- Structure type: Underground

Other information
- Station code: M-06, E-30

History
- Opened: 8 February 1961; 65 years ago

Passengers
- FY2011: 61,969 daily (Tokyo Metro); 33,011 daily (Toei)

Services
| Preceding station | Tokyo Metro | Following station |
|---|---|---|
| Shin-nakano towards Ogikubo | Marunouchi Line | Nishi-Shinjuku towards Ikebukuro |
| Nakano-shimbashi (Branch line) towards Hōnanchō | Marunouchi Line | Nishi-Shinjuku towards Ikebukuro |
| Preceding station | Toei Subway | Following station |
| Higashi-nakano towards Hikarigaoka | Ōedo Line | Nishi-shinjuku-gochōme towards Tochōmae |
Location
- Location within Special wards of Tokyo Location within Tokyo Bay and Bōsō Peninsula Location within Tokyo Location within Japan

Nakano-sakaue Station (中野坂上駅, Nakano-sakaue-eki) is a subway station in Nakano, Tokyo, Japan, jointly operated by the two Tokyo subway operators Tokyo Metro and Toei Subway.

== Lines ==
Nakano-sakaue Station is served by the Marunouchi Line from Ogikubo to Ikebukuro, and by the Ōedo Line. It is 18.5 km (11.5 mi) from the eastern terminus of the Line at Ikebukuro, and also forms the starting point of the 3.2 km (2.0 mi) branch of the Marunouchi Line to Honancho. The station is numbered M-06 on the Marunouchi Line, and E-30 on the Oedo Line.

== Station layout ==
=== Tokyo Metro platforms ===
The Tokyo Metro station has two island platforms serving three tracks on the second basement (B2F) level.

| 1 | Marunouchi Line | for Ogikubo |
| 2 | Marunouchi Line (branch line) | for Hōnanchō |
| 3 | Marunouchi Line | for Shinjuku, Ginza, Ōtemachi, and Ikebukuro |

During the off-peak, platform 2 is used by branch line trains shuttling between Nakano-Sakaue and Honancho. During the peak hours, some trains to Honancho on the branch line use platform 1, and some through trains from Honancho to Ikebukuro use platform 2.

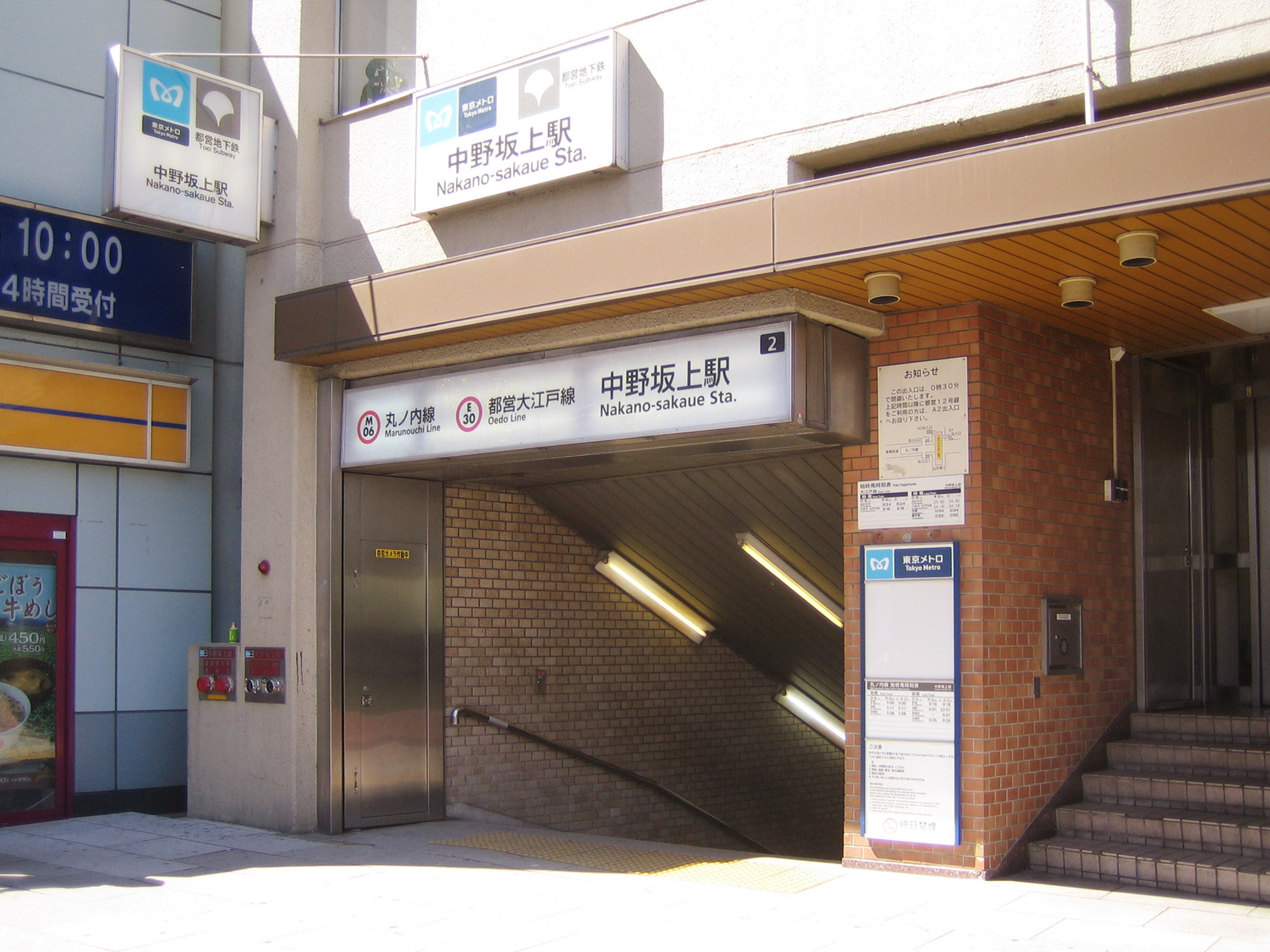
Entrance No. 2 in May 2006

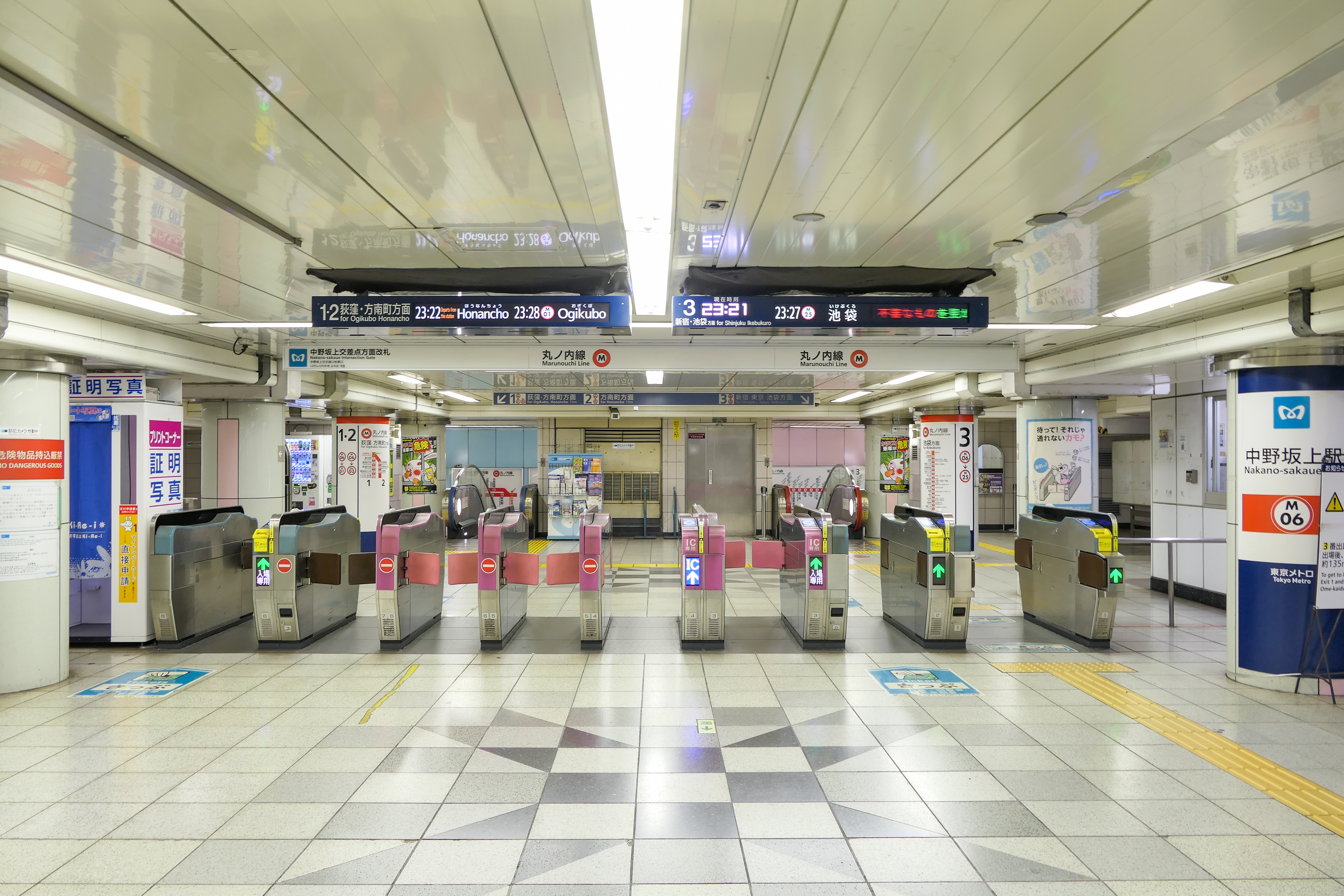
The ticket barriers to the Tokyo Metro Marunouchi Line platforms in August 2023

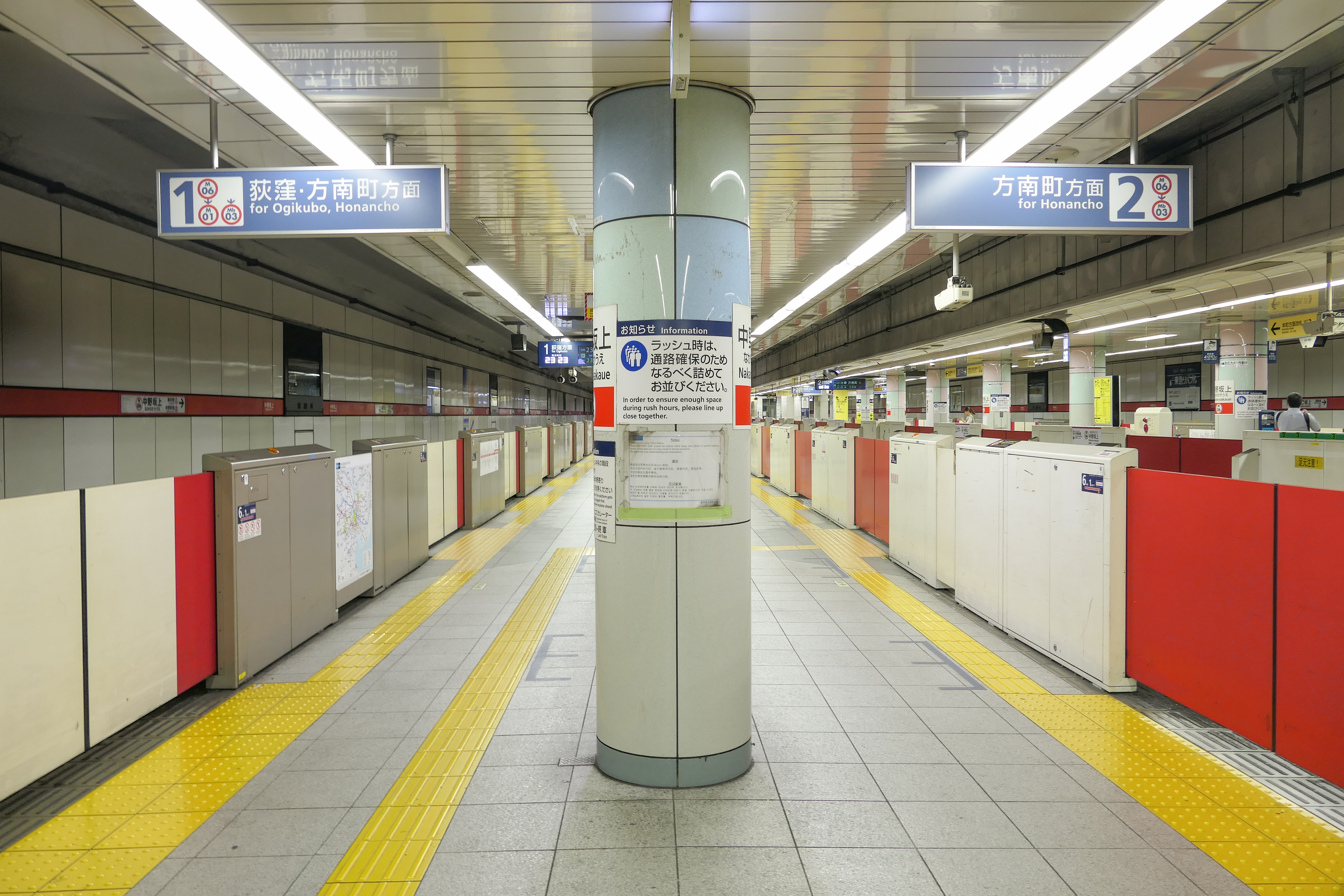
Platforms 1 and 2

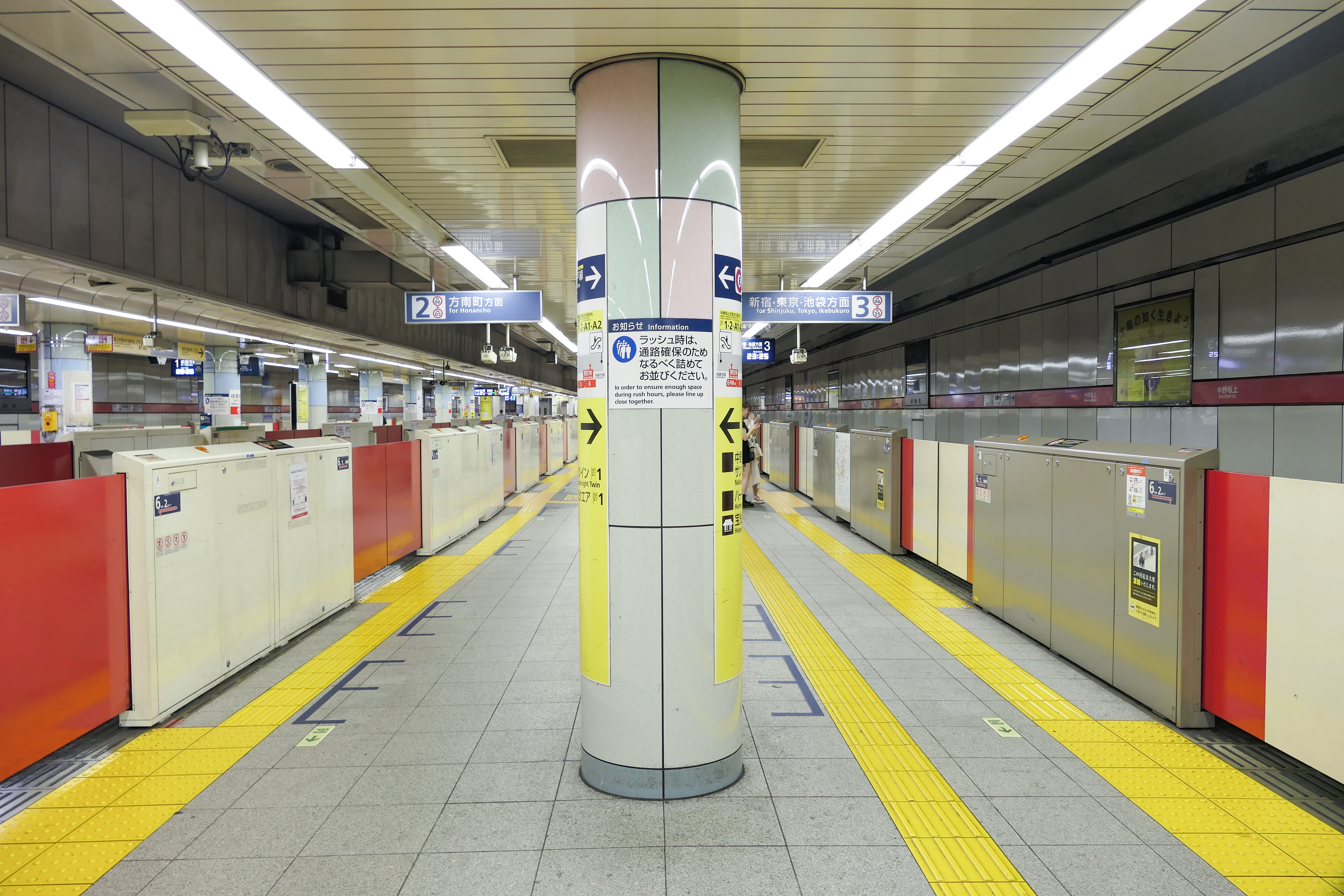
Platforms 2 and 3

=== Toei platforms ===
The Toei station has one island platform serving two tracks on the fourth basement (B4F) level.

| 1 | Ōedo Line | for Tochōmae, Roppongi, and Daimon |
| 2 | Ōedo Line | for Nerima and Hikarigaoka |

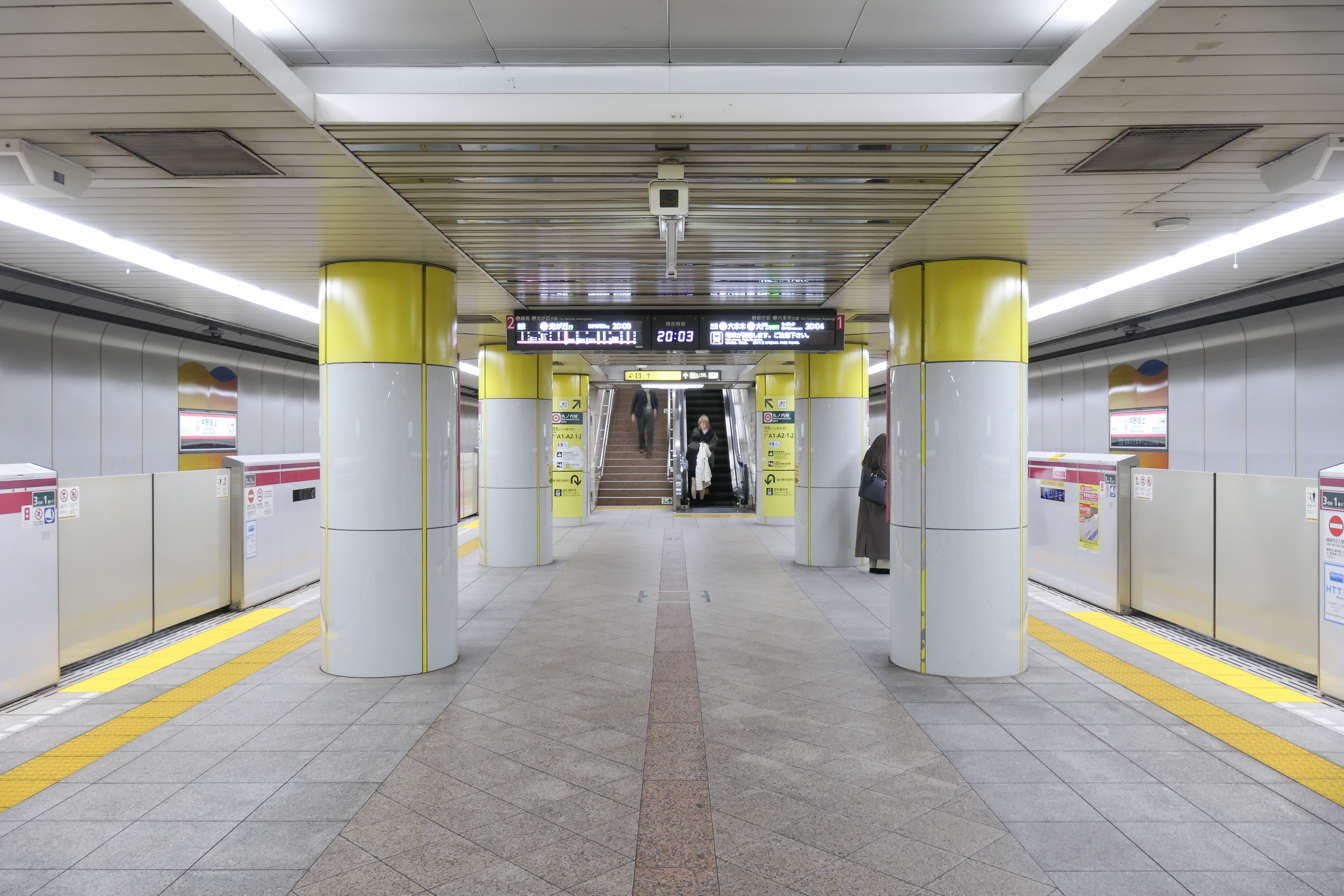
Toei Oedo Line platforms in 2022

== History ==
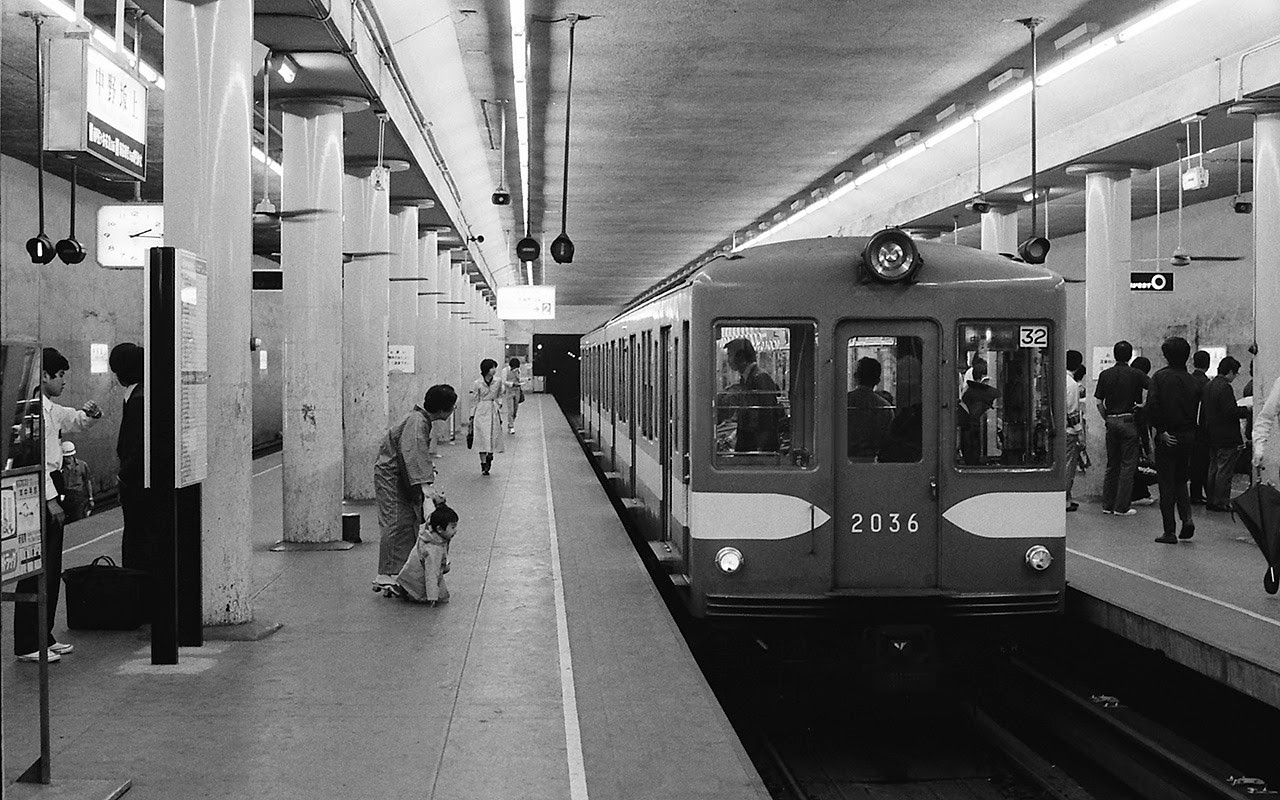
Nakano-sakaue Station in June 1977

The station was opened on 8 February 1961 by the Teito Rapid Transit Authority (TRTA). The Toei station opened on 19 December 1997.

The station facilities of the Marunouchi Line were inherited by Tokyo Metro after the privatization of the Teito Rapid Transit Authority (TRTA) in 2004.

== Passenger statistics ==
In fiscal 2011, the Tokyo Metro station was used by an average of 61,969 passengers daily, and the Toei station was used by an average of 33,011 passengers daily (alighting passengers only).

== Surrounding area ==
- Nakano Police Station
- Hozenji Temple
- Tokyo Polytechnic University Nakano campus

== See also ==
- List of railway stations in Japan
