= Hōnanchō Station =

Metro station in Tokyo, Japan

Coordinates: 35.683374°N 139.656873°E

Hōnanchō Station 方南町駅

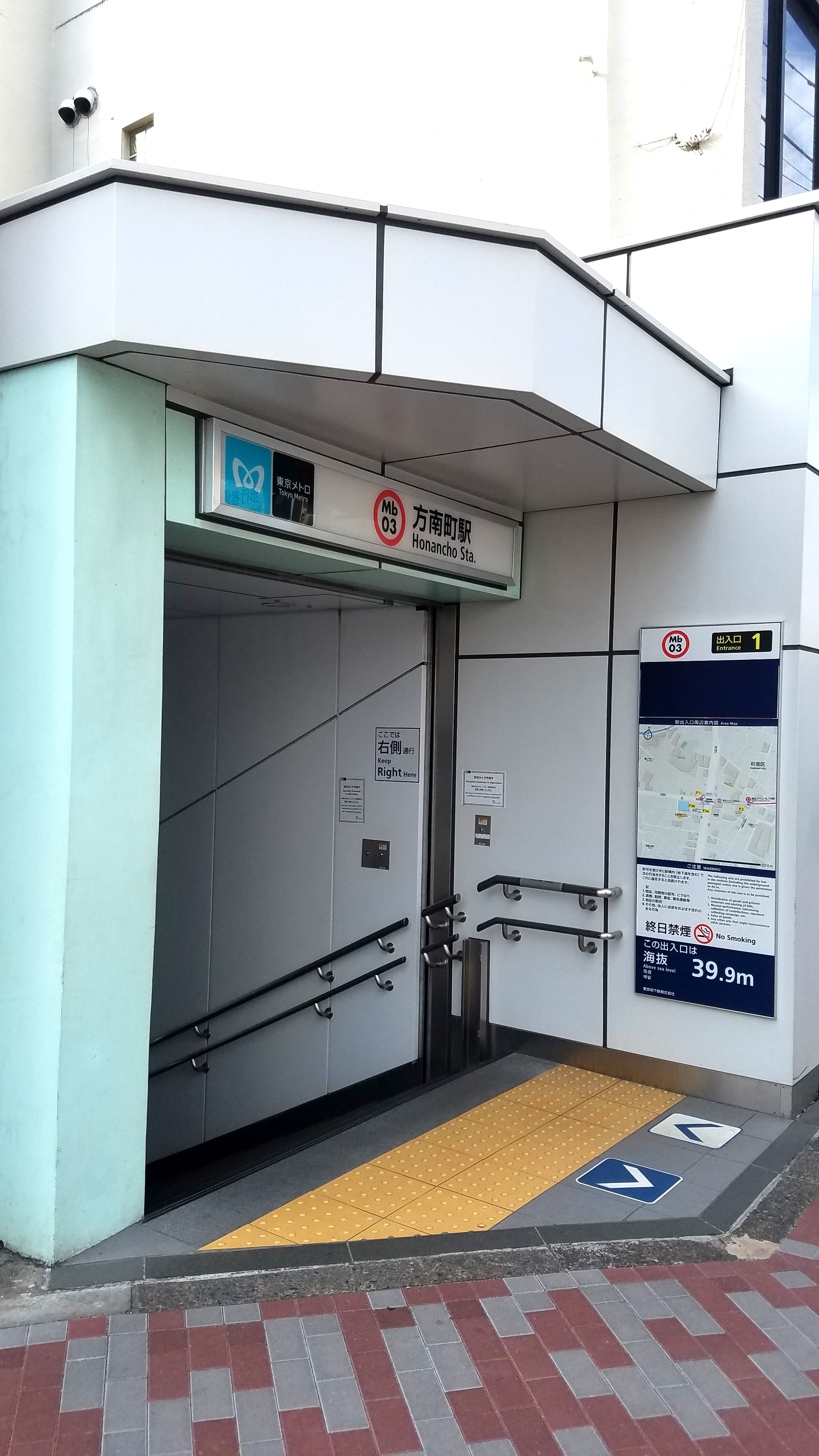
- No. 1 entrance in February 2022

General information
- Location: 1-1-1 Horinouchi, Suginami City, Tokyo 166-0013; Japan
- Operator: Tokyo Metro
- Line: Marunouchi Line – (Branch line)
- Platforms: 1 island platform
- Tracks: 2
- Connections: Bus stop

Construction
- Structure type: Underground

Other information
- Station code: Mb-03
- Website: Official website

History
- Opened: 23 March 1962; 64 years ago

Passengers
- FY2013: 33,335 daily

Services
Preceding station	Tokyo Metro	Following station
Terminus	Marunouchi Line (Branch line)	Nakano-fujimichō towards Nakano-sakaue
Location
- Location within Tokyo wards area Location within Tokyo Location within Japan

Hōnanchō Station (方南町駅, Hōnanchō-eki) is a subway station on the Tokyo Metro Marunouchi Line in Suginami, Tokyo, Japan, operated by the Tokyo subway operator Tokyo Metro.

== Lines ==
Hōnanchō Station is the terminus of the 3.2 km (2.0 mi) Honancho branch of the Tokyo Metro Marunouchi Line from Nakano-sakaue. It is numbered "Mb-03".

== Station layout ==
The station consists of a single underground island platform on the second basement level, serving two tracks.

There are two entrances to the station: Entrance 1 provides access to the west (terminating) end of the platforms via a concourse on the same second basement level, while Entrance 2 provides access to the east end of the platforms via a concourse on the first basement level. Toilet facilities are available on the Entrance 1 concourse.

=== Platforms ===
1/2	Marunouchi Line (Hōnanchō Branch)	for Ikebukuro

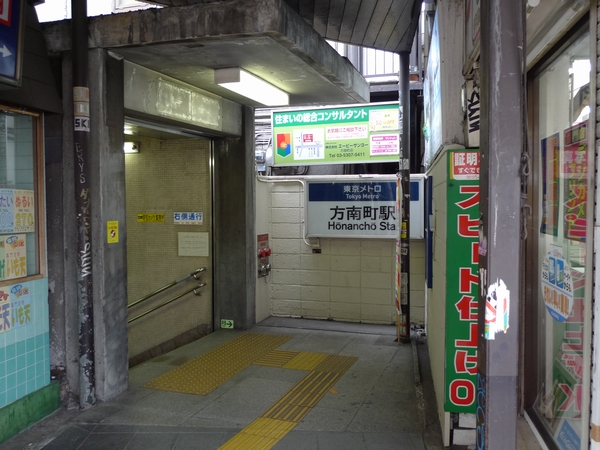
No. 2 entrance in April 2011

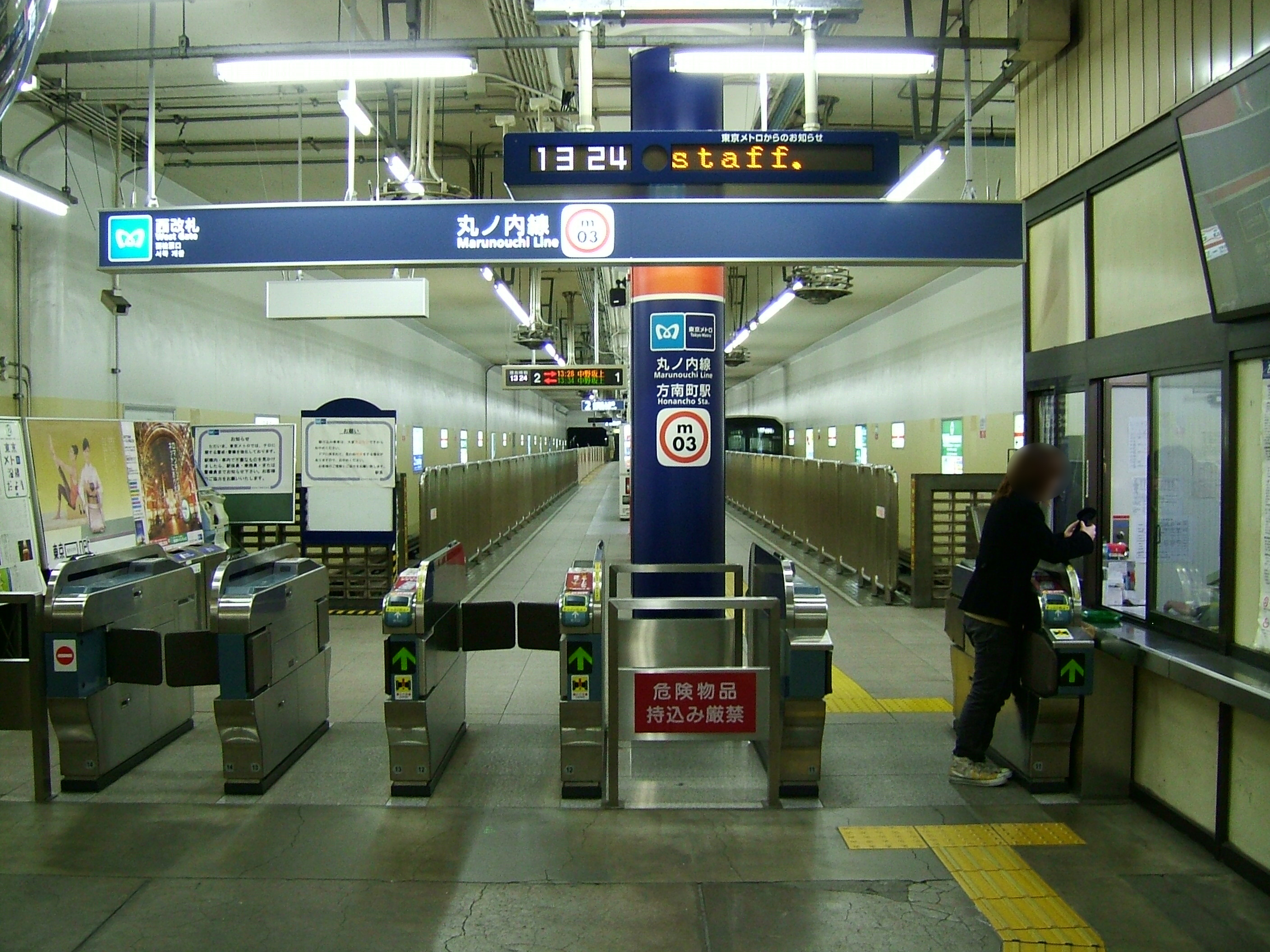
Ticket gates at the west end of the platforms in December 2006

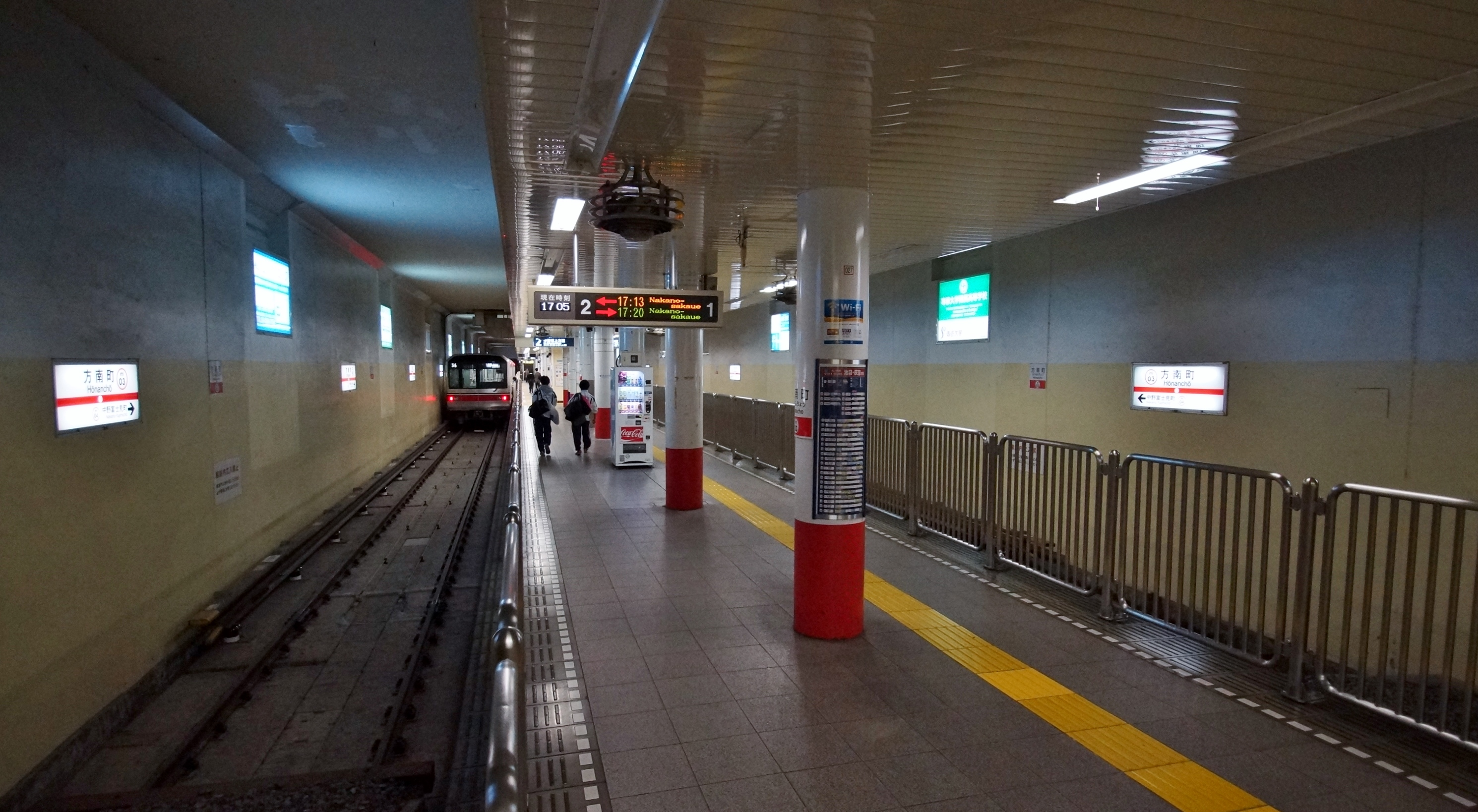
The west end of the platforms in November 2013

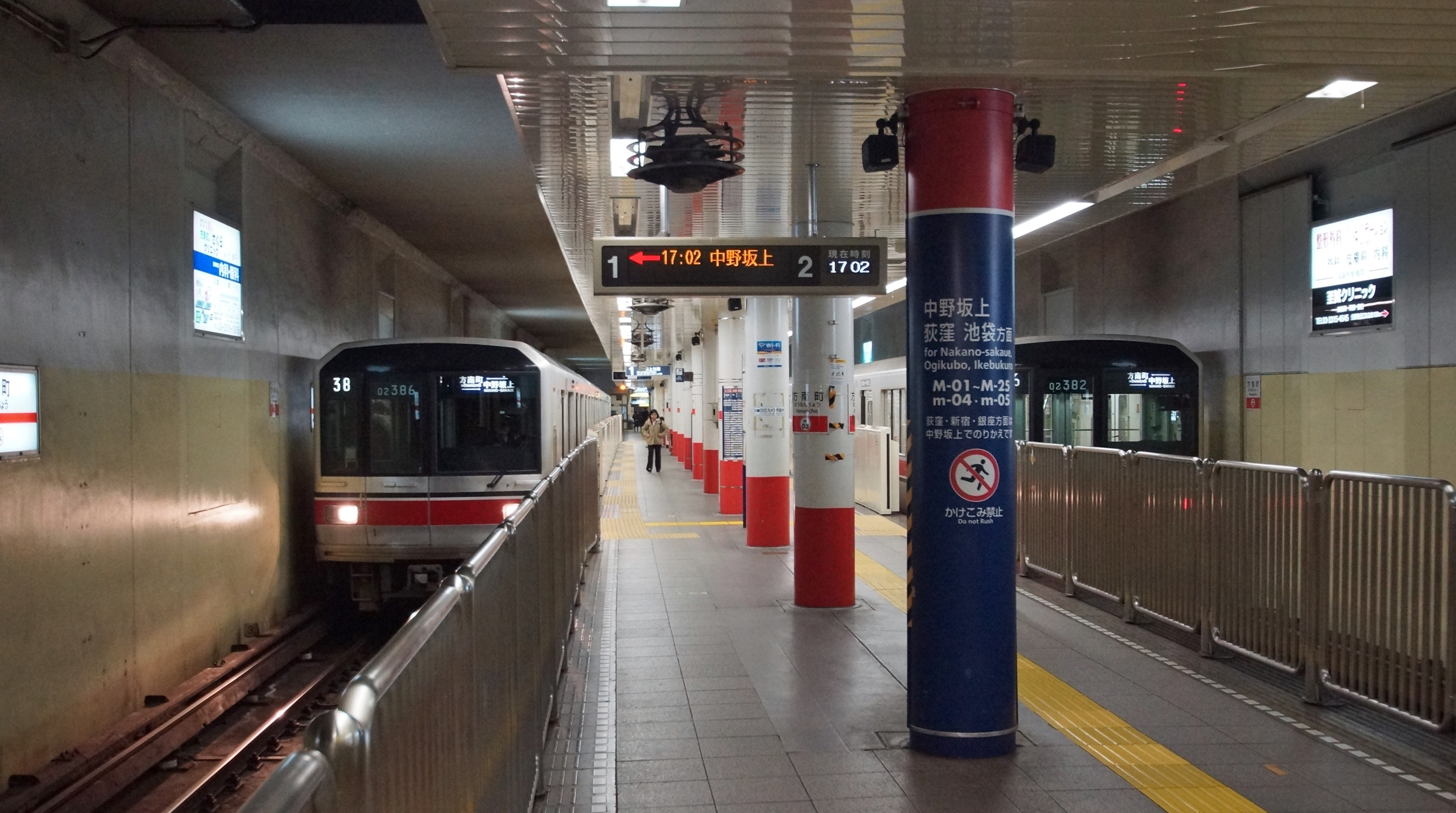
The east end of the platforms in November 2013

== History ==
Honancho Station opened on 23 March 1962.

The station facilities were inherited by Tokyo Metro after the privatization of the Teito Rapid Transit Authority (TRTA) in 2004.

Construction work started in 2013 to extend the platform-edge doors along the platforms to handle six-car trains, allowing through-running services to and from Ikebukuro via the main Marunouchi Line from fiscal 2017.

== Passenger statistics ==
In fiscal 2013, the station was the hundredth-busiest on the Tokyo Metro network with an average of 33,335 passengers daily.

The passenger statistics for previous years are as shown below.

Fiscal year	Daily average
2011	31,095
2012	32,060
2013	33,335

== Surrounding area ==
- Kanda River

=== Exit 1 (west end) ===
- Izumi Health Center
- Sennan Junior High School

=== Exit 2 (east end) ===
- Nakano Special Needs Education School
- Minami-Nakano Junior High School
- Honan Elementary School

== See also ==
- List of railway stations in Japan
