= Tokyo Dome =

Indoor stadium in Bunkyo, Tokyo, Japan

Coordinates: 35°42′20″N 139°45′07″E

- 東京ドーム
- The Big Egg; Tokyo Big Egg

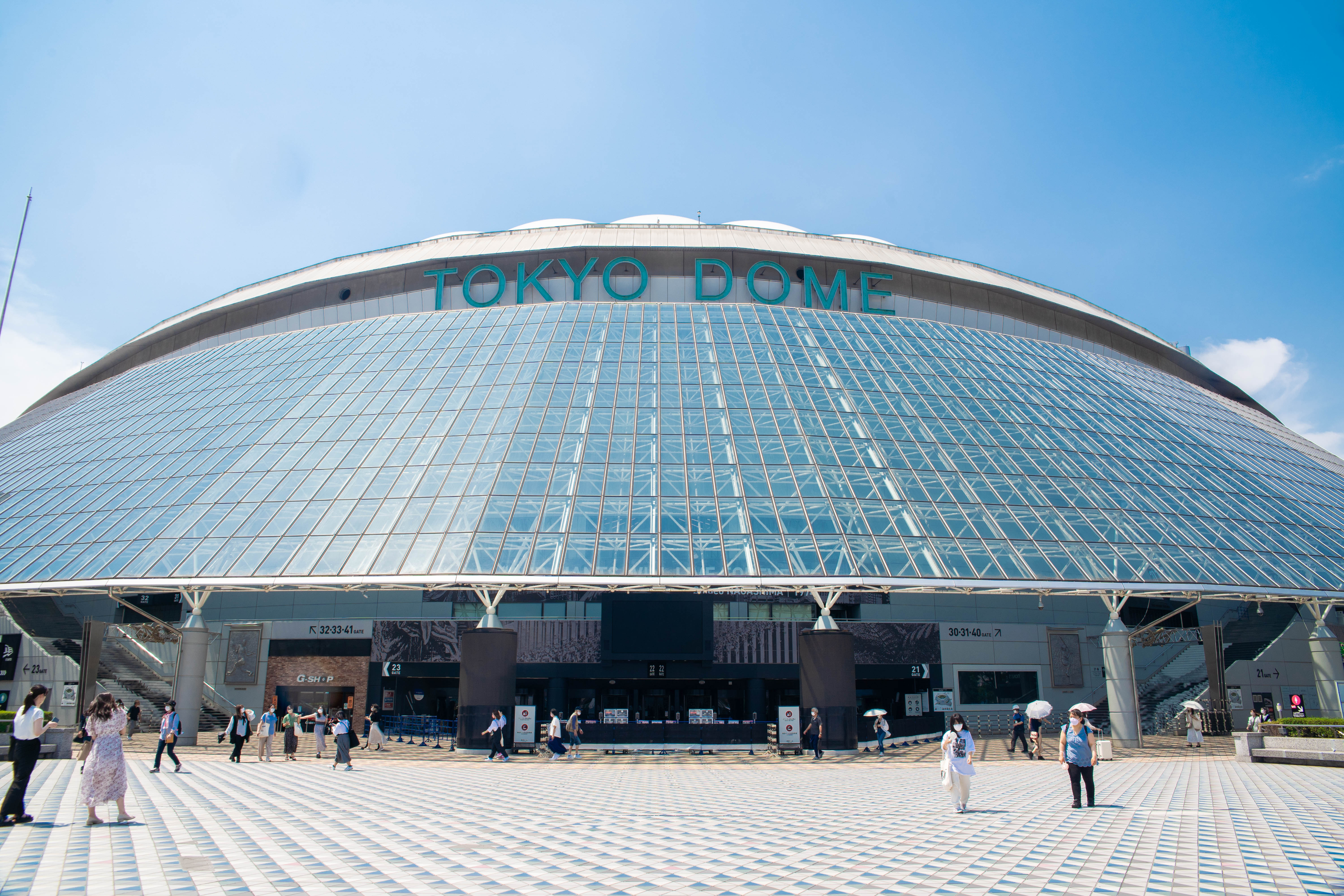
- Interactive map of Tokyo Dome
- Location: 3, Koraku 1-chome, Bunkyō, Tokyo, Japan
- Owner: Tokyo Dome Corporation (Note: 株式会社東京ドーム, Kabushiki gaisha Tōkyō Dōmu; formerly Korakuen Stadium Company, Ltd. (株式会社後楽園スタヂアム, Kabushiki gaisha Kōrakuen Sutajiumu)) (Mitsui Fudosan (80%) and The Yomiuri Shimbun Holdings (20%))
- Capacity: 42,000–55,000 (events); 45,600 (baseball); 57,000 (maximum)
- Surface: AstroTurf (1988–2002); FieldTurf (2003–present)
- Field size: Facility Capacity Area Site: 112,456 m^{2} (27.788 acres); Building: 46,755 m^{2} (503,270 sq ft); Internal height: 56 m (184 ft) Field: 13,000 m^{2} (140,000 sq ft); Left/right field – 100 m (330 ft); Left/right-center – 110 m (360 ft); Center field – 122 m (400 ft); Capacity: 1,240,000 m^{3} (43.8 million cubic feet)
- Public transit: Suidobashi Station (JR Chūō–Sōbu Line); Korakuen Station (Tokyo Metro Marunouchi Line, Namboku Line); Kasuga Station (Toei Ōedo Line, Mita Line)

Construction
- Opened: March 17, 1988
- Architects: Nikken Sekkei, Takenaka Corporation
- Builder: Takenaka Corporation
- Structural engineers: Nikken Sekkei, Geiger Engineers

Tenants
- Yomiuri Giants (NPB) (1988–present); Nippon-Ham Fighters (NPB) (1988–2003); Tokyo Yakult Swallows (NPB) (selected matches)

Tokyo Dome (Japanese: 東京ドーム, Hepburn: Tōkyō Dōmu) is an indoor stadium in Bunkyō, Tokyo, Japan. It was designed as a baseball stadium following its predecessor, Korakuen Stadium (whose former site is now occupied by the Tokyo Dome Hotel and a plaza for this stadium).

== Construction ==
Construction on the stadium began on May 16, 1985, and it opened on March 17, 1988. It was built on the site of the Velodrome, adjacent to Korakuen Stadium and the Koishikawa-Kōrakuen garden. It has a maximum total capacity of 57,000 depending on configuration, with an all-seating configuration of 42,000.

Tokyo Dome's original nickname was "The Big Egg", with some calling it the "Tokyo Big Egg". Its dome-shaped roof is an air-supported structure, a cable-reinforced 0.8 mm flexible fiberglass membrane supported by slightly pressurizing the inside of the stadium with 150,000 m^{3}/hour using independent blowers. It was developed by Nikken Sekkei and Takenaka Corporation, and modeled after the Hubert H. Humphrey Metrodome.

== History ==
It is the home field of the Yomiuri Giants baseball team. On March 18, 1988, the day after Tokyo Dome opened, the Yomiuri Giants held a game which was the first event in Tokyo Dome. In April 1988, Hibari Misora became one of the first singers to perform in the Tokyo Dome, performing her "Phoenix" tour. The Yomiuri Giants host about 70 games a year at their home stadium, Tokyo Dome, and other Nippon Professional Baseball teams sometimes host several games a year at Tokyo Dome. If the Yomiuri Giants advance to the Climax Series or the Japan Series, additional games will be held at Tokyo Dome. Interleague play, in which the Yomiuri Giants participate, will also be held at Tokyo Dome. In 2021, the Tokyo Yakult Swallows advanced to the Japan Series, but they held the Japan Series at Tokyo Dome instead of their home stadium, Meiji Jingu Stadium. This was because the Japan Series had to be rescheduled due to the spread of COVID-19 infectious disease, and the dates overlapped with the game days of amateur baseball tournaments at Meiji Jingu Stadium. Tokyo Dome is also the location of the Japanese Baseball Hall of Fame which chronicles the history of baseball in Japan.

It has also hosted international baseball tournaments such as the World Baseball Classic, WBSC Premier12, Major League Baseball, music concerts, basketball, American football, association football games, puroresu (pro-wrestling) matches, mixed martial arts events, kickboxing events, and monster truck races. It became the first Japanese venue with an American football attendance above 50,000.

The stadium has undergone two renovations: the first one beginning in 2016 and the second one beginning in 2021.

== Tokyo Dome City ==
Tokyo Dome is part of a greater entertainment complex known as Tokyo Dome City, built of the grounds of the former Tokyo Koishikawa Arsenal. Tokyo Dome City includes an amusement park and Tokyo Dome City Attractions (formerly Kōrakuen Grounds). This amusement park occupies the former Korakuen Stadium site and includes a roller coaster named Thunder Dolphin and a hubless Ferris wheel. The grounds also have an onsen called Spa LaQua, various shops, restaurants, video game centers, the largest JRA WINS horse race betting complex in Tokyo, and Oft Korakuen, which caters to rural horse races.

== Notable events other than Japanese professional baseball ==
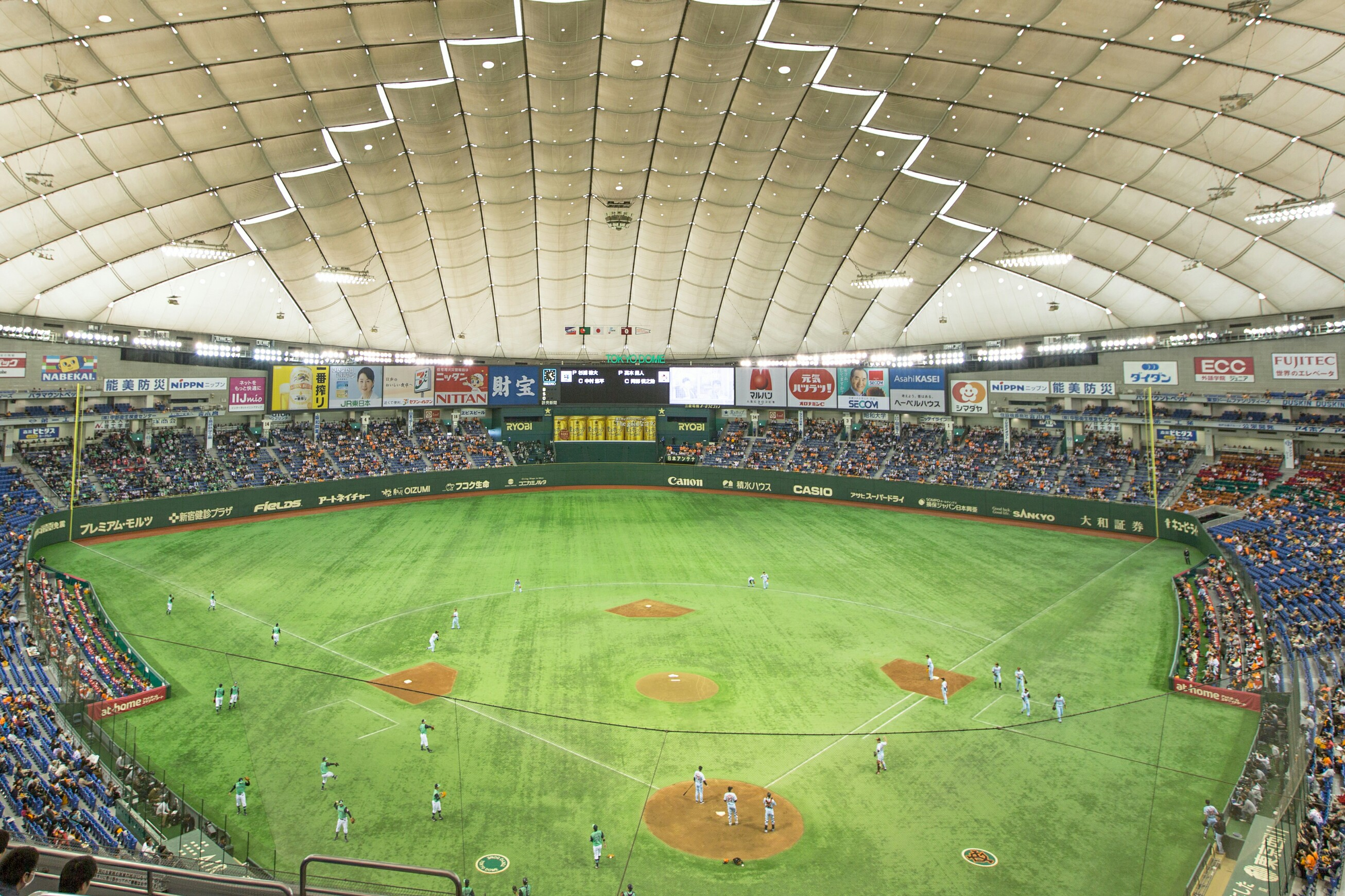
Tokyo Dome interior

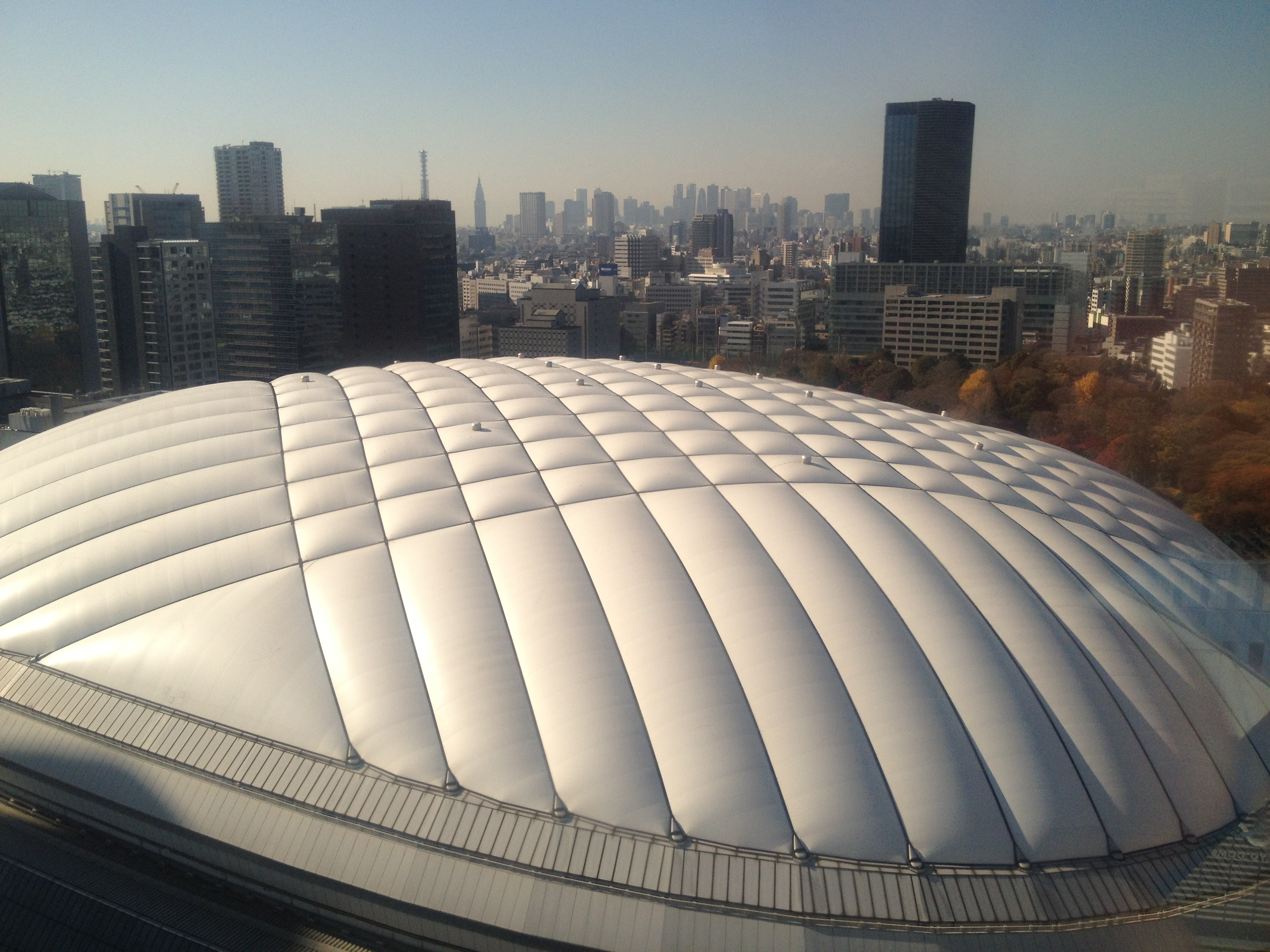
Tokyo Dome roof

=== International baseball tournaments and Major League Baseball ===
Tokyo Dome has been selected as one of the baseball stadiums to host international baseball tournaments since the 2000s. Tokyo Dome has been selected to host all six World Baseball Classics through 2026. It has also been selected three times to host the WBSC Premier 12 finals.

Tokyo Dome has held various Major League Baseball games to open the seasons, with the first series—a two-game slate between the Chicago Cubs and New York Mets in 2000—being the first time American MLB teams have played regular season games in Asia. Four years later, the New York Yankees, featuring former Yomiuri Giants slugger/outfielder Hideki Matsui in their lineup, and the Tampa Bay Devil Rays played two games in the stadium to start the 2004 season. The Boston Red Sox and the Oakland Athletics opened the 2008 MLB season in Japan, and also competed against Japanese teams. To open the 2012 season the Seattle Mariners and the Athletics, the former of which had Ichiro Suzuki, played a two-game series on March 28–29. In game one Seattle – led by Ichiro's 4 hits – won 3–1 in 11 innings. The Mariners and Athletics returned to Tokyo Dome for a two-game series to begin the 2019 Major League Baseball season, with Ichiro retiring from professional baseball after the second game. On July 18, 2024, Major League Baseball announced that the 2025 MLB season opened with a two game series March 18–19 at Tokyo Dome between the Los Angeles Dodgers and the Chicago Cubs.

Date	Winning team	Result	Losing team	Attendance
March 29, 2000	Chicago Cubs	5–3	New York Mets	55,000
March 30, 2000	New York Mets	5–1	Chicago Cubs	55,000
March 30, 2004	Tampa Bay Devil Rays	8–3	New York Yankees	55,000
March 31, 2004	New York Yankees	12–1	Tampa Bay Devil Rays	55,000
March 25, 2008	Boston Red Sox	6–5	Oakland Athletics	44,628
March 26, 2008	Oakland Athletics	5–1	Boston Red Sox	44,735
March 28, 2012	Seattle Mariners	3–1	Oakland Athletics	44,227
March 29, 2012	Oakland Athletics	4–1	Seattle Mariners	43,391
March 20, 2019	Seattle Mariners	9–7	Oakland Athletics	45,787
March 21, 2019	Seattle Mariners	5–4	Oakland Athletics	46,451
March 18, 2025	Los Angeles Dodgers	4–1	Chicago Cubs	42,365
March 19, 2025	Los Angeles Dodgers	6–3	Chicago Cubs	42,367

=== Concerts ===
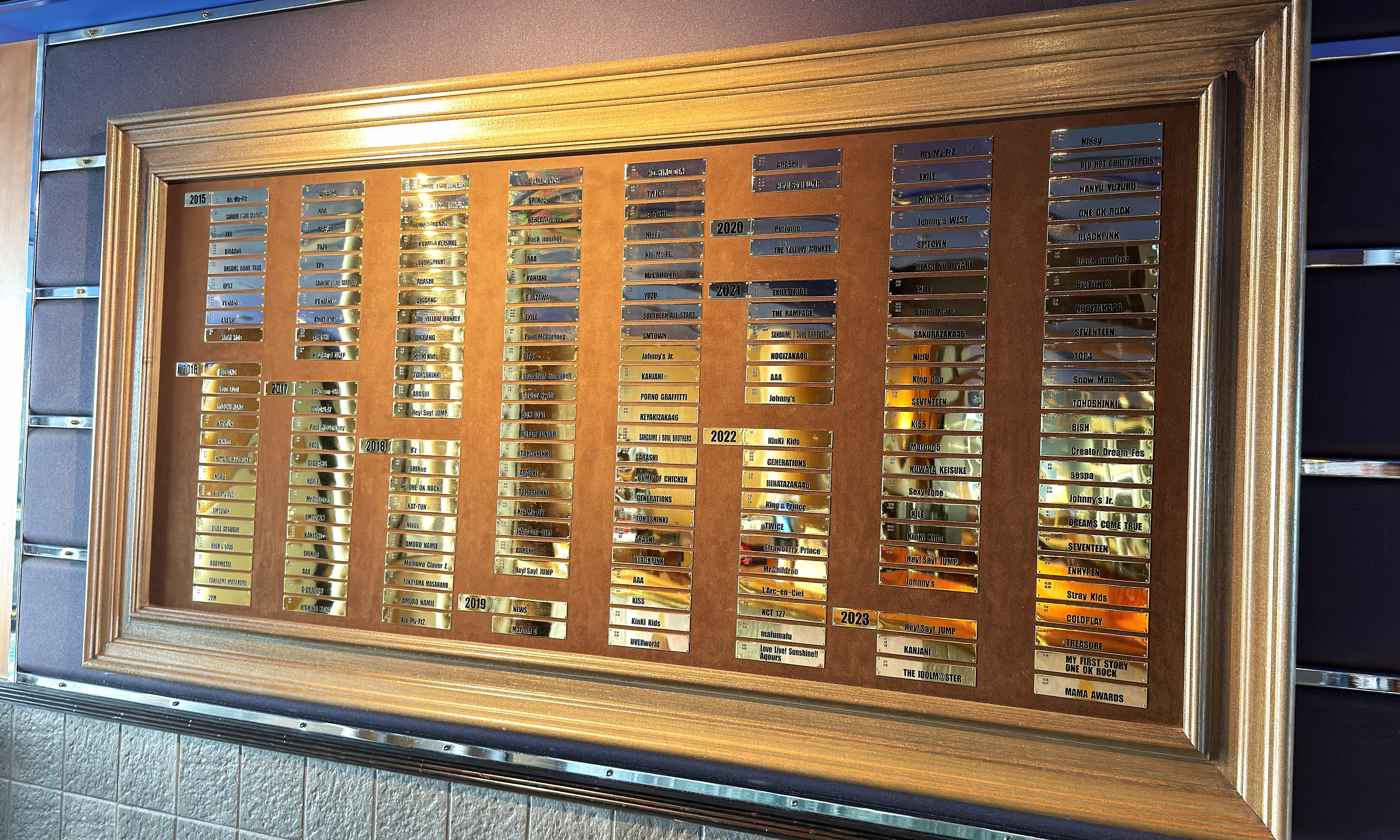
Nameplates of invited guest artists from 2015 to 2023, displayed in the Artist's Café at Tokyo Dome Hotel

Tokyo Dome is considered to be a symbolic venue and “dream stage” for Japanese pop singers. The Tokyo Dome Corporation publishes a list of singers and music groups that have performed since its opening in 1988. The Alfee held its first concert at Tokyo Dome on March 19 and 20, 1988, two days after the dome opened. (Note: As a guest of the 1988 International Marching Band Pageant.) On March 22 and 23, 1988, Mick Jagger became the first non-Japanese artist to perform at Tokyo Dome.

Hibari Misora performed her phoenix tour here in April 1988. Misora was not the very first artist to perform at the dome, but the concert is often still called its inaugural concert.

Concerts have been held at Tokyo Dome for several dozen days each year since its opening, mainly by Japanese singers and music groups. According to official statistics from its opening in 1988 to December 2025, KinKi Kids (now Domoto) held the most solo concerts at Tokyo Dome for 71 days, followed by Arashi for 58 days and Kanjani Eight (Super Eight) for 47 days. All of them were male idol groups from Johnny & Associates. For rock band category, B'z held the most concerts at Tokyo Dome for 23 days, followed by L'Arc-en-Ciel for 20 days and Mr. Children for 19 days.

Among non-Japanese, Korean K-pop Group TVXQ held the most solo concerts at Tokyo Dome for 33 days, followed by The Rolling Stones for 28 days and followed by Michael Jackson and Paul McCartney for 21 days.

Michael Jackson performed there on his three tours. As part of the second leg of his Bad World Tour, he performed at the Tokyo Big Egg on 9-11, 17-19, and 24–26 December 1988. In Jackson's next tour, the Dangerous World Tour, he performed on the stadium during the first leg, on 12, 14, 17, 19, 22, 24, 30, and 31 December 1992. On his final tour HIStory World Tour, he performed on multiple dates at the stadium last time, on 13, 15, 17, and 20 December 1996.

Kylie Minogue played one show on 6 October 1989 on her Disco in Dream Tour

Janet Jackson played four shows on 17 and 18 May and 6 and 7 November 1990 during her Rhythm Nation World Tour. The May 17 show sold out in a record-breaking 7 minutes. She returned for the Janet World Tour on March 29 and 30, 1994 and her All for You Tour on January 17 and 18, 2002. Guns N' Roses performed there on 19, 20, and 22 February 1992 and 12, 14, and 15 January 1993 during their Use Your Illusion Tour, then again on December 19, 2009 during their Chinese Democracy tour.

Madonna played five shows on 13, 14, 16, 17 and 19 December 1993 which concluded her tour The Girlie Show. She also held two concerts on 20 and 21 September 2006 as part of the Confessions Tour.

Britney Spears played one show on April 25, 2002 on her Dream Within A Dream Tour.

Mariah Carey performed there for the first time on her Daydream World Tour, on 7, 10, and 14 March 1996, bringing in a total of 150,000 people with the three dates, she obtained the record for best-selling tickets in less than one hour. In 1998, the singer returned to Japan on her Butterfly World Tour, where she broke her old record, this time selling out 200,000 tickets in less than one hour across four shows on 11, 14, 17, and 20 January. She would return to the stadium for two shows in 2000 with her Rainbow World Tour.

Whitney Houston played two shows on 13 and 14 May 1997 during her Pacific Rim Tour.

Celine Dion has performed five shows at the Dome. She performed on 31 January and 1 February 1999 as part of her Let's Talk About Love World Tour; 8 and 9 March 2008 as part of her Taking Chances World Tour; and 26 June 2018 as part of her Live 2018 tour. Dion was scheduled to perform two shows on 18 and 19 November 2014 as part of her Asia Tour, but the shows were cancelled.

Beyoncé kicked off the first show on her first concert world tour The Beyoncé Experience on 10 April 2007.

X Japan performed at Tokyo Dome on New Years Eve five years in a row beginning in 1992, notably including their final concert before their first disbandment on December 31, 1997, which was also their final show with guitarist hide, who died a few months after

BiSH performed their final show before disbandment on June 29, 2023

Coldplay have played the venue three times; first on 19 April 2017 during their A Head Full of Dreams Tour, and further two times on 6 and 7 November 2023 during their Music of the Spheres World Tour.

Taylor Swift opened her 1989 World Tour at the venue with two concerts on 5 and 6 May 2015, and she played two more shows on 20 and 21 November 2018 as part of the Reputation Stadium Tour. She also played four consecutive concerts on 7–10 February 2024 for The Eras Tour.

Bruno Mars performed three concerts in October 2022 and returned for seven more concerts in January 2024, as part of his 2022-24 tour, becoming the biggest shows in Japan by an international act in the 21st century.

G-Dragon performed two shows on May 10 and 11, 2025, as part of his Übermensch World Tour.

Twice performed two shows on September 16 and 17, 2025, as part of their This Is For World Tour.

Oasis performed two shows on October 25 and 26 2025, as part of their Live '25 reunion tour.

Ado performed two shows on November 11 and 12, 2025, as part of her first-ever dome tour, Ado DOME TOUR 2025 "Yodaka".

Blackpink have performed three shows on 16, 17, and 18 January 2026 as part of their Deadline World Tour.

Lady Gaga has performed four shows on 25, 26, 29 and 30 January 2026 as part of her The Mayhem Ball.

Ive performed one night on June 24, 2026 as part of their Show What I Am World Tour.

=== Professional wrestling ===
New Japan Pro-Wrestling (NJPW) has held a professional wrestling event at Tokyo Dome, currently titled Wrestle Kingdom, on January 4 of each year, since 1992. The event expanded in 2020 to two nights, with the second night on January 5; the event went back to one night in 2024. The event is the biggest in Japanese professional wrestling, and has been compared to WWE's flagship U.S. event WrestleMania in terms of size and significance. Other companies such as All Japan Pro Wrestling, Universal Wrestling Federation, Pro Wrestling Noah, and WWE had previously held major events in Tokyo Dome as well.

On 30 June 2024, it was announced that All Elite Wrestling, NJPW, Ring of Honor, Consejo Mundial de Lucha Libre, and Stardom would all be part of a cross-promotional pay-per-view event called Wrestle Dynasty, which took place on 5 January 2025, one day after Wrestle Kingdom 19.

=== Boxing ===
- In boxing, Mike Tyson fought twice in Tokyo Dome — a successful undisputed title defense against Tony Tubbs in 1988, and in a loss considered to be one of the biggest upsets in sports history to James "Buster" Douglas in 1990.
- Naoya Inoue has also headlined two bouts at Tokyo Dome. The first boxing match took place on 6 May 2024 at the venue for the first time in 34 years against Luis Nery for the undisputed super-bantamweight championship. Inoue successfully defended the title after knocking Nery out in the 6th round. Inoue then faced off against fellow undefeated fighter Junto Nakatani on 2 May 2026, in what was initially touted by the writers of the Associated Press and Yahoo News as the "biggest fight in Japanese boxing history". Inoue successfully defended his undisputed super-bantamweight championship after defeating Nakatani via unanimous decision.

=== Kickboxing ===
The final round of the K-1 World Grand Prix kickboxing tournament was held at Tokyo Dome from 1997 to 2006.

=== Mixed martial arts ===
Tokyo Dome hosted seven Pride FC mixed martial arts fights: Pride 1, Pride 4, Pride Grand Prix 2000 Opening Round, Pride Grand Prix 2000 Finals, Pride 17, Pride 23, and Pride Final Conflict 2003. The last event had an attendance of 67,451.

=== American football ===
As part of the American Bowl, Tokyo Dome held 13 National Football League preseason games between 1989 and 2005. In the 1996 game between the San Diego Chargers and Pittsburgh Steelers, three Japanese linebackers – Takuro Abe, Shigemasa Ito, and Takahiro Ikenoue of the World League of American Football – became the first Japanese players to participate in an NFL game; Abe and Ito sporadically appeared on special teams for the Chargers, while Ikenoue was part of the Steelers' defense.

Date	Winning Team	Result	Losing Team	Attendance
August 6, 1989	Los Angeles Rams	16–13 (OT)	San Francisco 49ers	43,896
August 5, 1990	Denver Broncos	10–7	Seattle Seahawks	48,827
August 4, 1991	Miami Dolphins	19–17	Los Angeles Raiders	-
August 2, 1992	Houston Oilers	34–23	Dallas Cowboys	-
August 1, 1993	New Orleans Saints	28–16	Philadelphia Eagles	-
August 7, 1994	Minnesota Vikings	17–9	Kansas City Chiefs	49,555
August 6, 1995	Denver Broncos	24–10	San Francisco 49ers	-
July 28, 1996	San Diego Chargers	20–10	Pittsburgh Steelers	-
August 2, 1998	Green Bay Packers	27–24 (OT)	Kansas City Chiefs	42,018
August 6, 2000	Atlanta Falcons	27–24	Dallas Cowboys	-
August 2, 2003	Tampa Bay Buccaneers	30–14	New York Jets	-
August 6, 2005	Atlanta Falcons	27–21	Indianapolis Colts	45,203

College football was played 17 straight years in Tokyo, including six years at Tokyo Dome, through the Coca-Cola Classic. In December 1993, the Wisconsin Badgers clinched the Big Ten college football championship and a berth to their first Rose Bowl in 31 years by defeating the Michigan State Spartans 41-20 in the last Coca-Cola Classic, before nearly 52,000 at Tokyo Dome. Ironically, the game was moved from Camp Randall Stadium in Madison so the Badgers' seniors would get their opportunity to enjoy a bowl game atmosphere.

Tokyo Dome is also the regular home for championship matches for Japan's domestic American football leagues, including the professional X-League's Japan X Bowl and Rice Bowl.

=== Association football ===
The first of four "Kick Aids" charity matches was held on 22 April 1988. Pele All-Stars defeated Japan Senior All-Stars 2-0 despite Pele not playing in the match due to a minor injury. Over 48,000 spectators came to the match with ¥8,000,000 raised and went to the Japan Aids Foundation.

In 1993, Aston Villa played Verdy Kawasaki in a friendly match.

=== Monster truck rallies ===
In 1989, the United States Hot Rod Association hosted one of the first monster truck rallies outside North America at Tokyo Dome.

=== Figure skating ===
On 26 February 2023, Japanese figure skater and two-time Olympic champion, Yuzuru Hanyu, held a solo ice show titled Gift at Tokyo Dome. His show marked the first time that an ice rink was set up at the multipurpose venue, matching the size of an Olympic ice rink with 60 m × 30 m. The show was directed by Hanyu himself in collaboration with Japanese choreographer Mikiko and performed live with the Tokyo Philharmonic Orchestra among others, having set a new audience record for ice shows with 35,000 spectators. On 14 July 2023, the event was distributed by the American subscription channel Disney+ worldwide.

== Attendances ==
The home attendances of the Yomiuri Giants at the Tokyo Dome:

Season	Games	Total attendance	Average attendance
2025	71	2,823,050	39,761

== See also ==
- Inflatable building
- List of stadiums in Japan
- List of thin shell structures
- Romexpo Dome
- Thin-shell structure

Events and tenants
Preceded by Korakuen Stadium	Home of the Yomiuri Giants; 1988 – present	Succeeded by current
Preceded by Korakuen Stadium	Home of the Nippon Ham Fighters; 1988–2003	Succeeded by Sapporo Dome
