= Kōrakuen Station =

Metro station in Tokyo, Japan

Coordinates: 35.70734°N 139.751303°E

Kōrakuen Station 後楽園駅

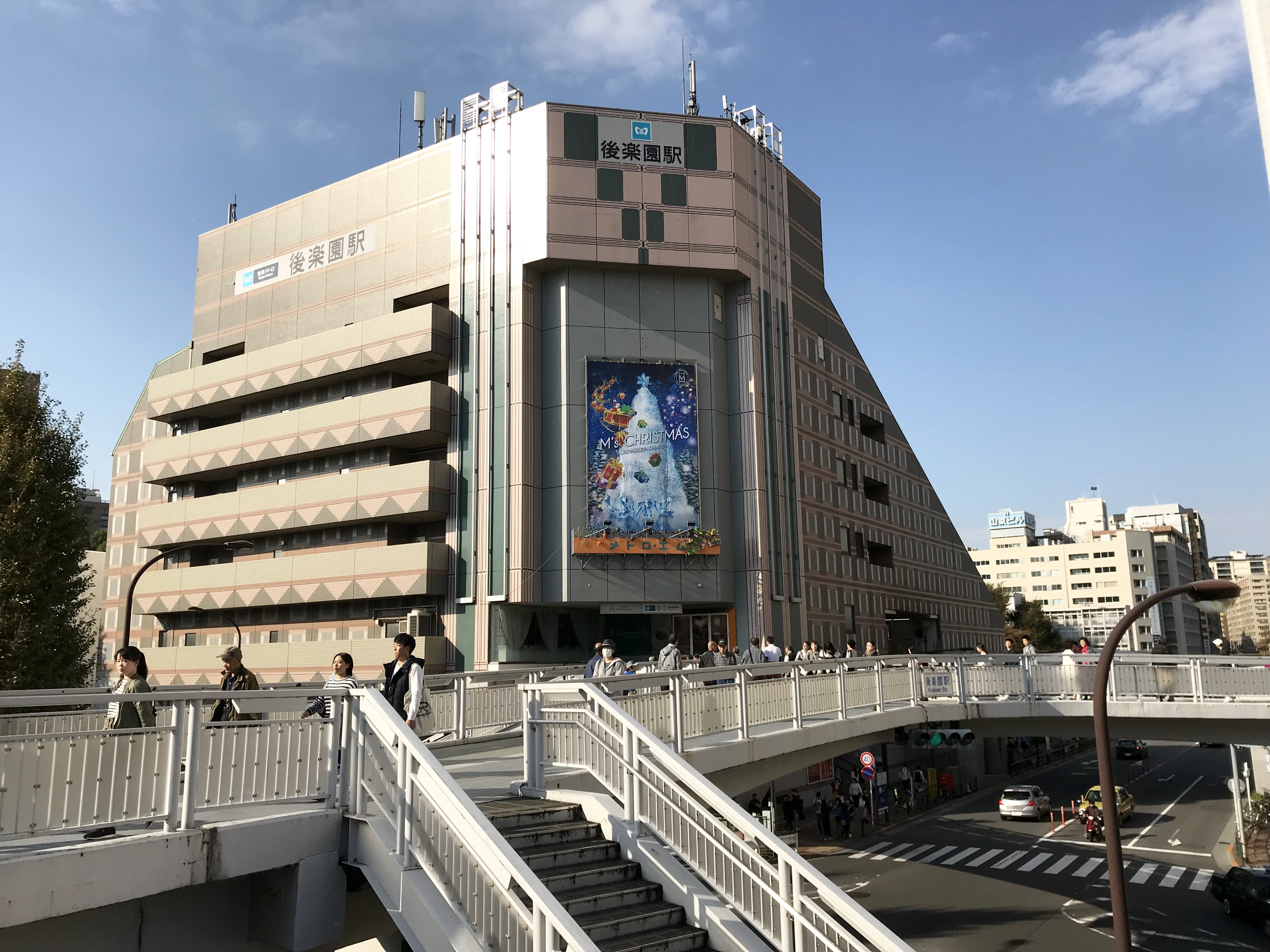
- Korakuen Station exterior, March 2006

General information
- Location: 1-2-3 Kasuga, Bunkyō, Tokyo （東京都文京区春日1-2-3） Japan
- Operator: Tokyo Metro
- Lines: Marunouchi Line; Namboku Line
- Platforms: 2 side platforms (Marunouchi Line); 1 island platform (Namboku Line)
- Tracks: 4 (2 for each line)
- Connections: Kasuga

Construction
- Structure type: Elevated (Marunouchi Line); Underground (Namboku Line)

Other information
- Station code: M-22, N-11

History
- Opened: 20 January 1954; 72 years ago

Services
Preceding station	Tokyo Metro	Following station
Hongō-sanchōme towards Ogikubo or Hōnanchō	Marunouchi Line	Myōgadani towards Ikebukuro
Iidabashi towards Meguro	Namboku Line	Tōdaimae towards Akabane-iwabuchi
Location
- Location within Tokyo Yamanote Loop Location within Tokyo wards area Location within Japan

Kōrakuen Station (後楽園駅, Kōrakuen-eki) is a subway train station in Bunkyō, Tokyo, Japan, operated by the Tokyo subway operator Tokyo Metro. It is directly connected by an underground pedestrian passage to the Toei-operated Kasuga Station. It is integrated with the Tokyo Dome City complex and the Bunkyō ward capitol building.

== Lines ==
Kōrakuen Station is served by the following lines:

- Tokyo Metro Marunouchi Line, station number M-22
- Tokyo Metro Namboku Line, station number N-11

Nearby Kasuga, connected by a pedestrian passageway, is served by the following lines.

- Toei Mita Line, station number I-12
- Toei Ōedo Line, station number E-07

== Layout ==
The Marunouchi Line platforms (1 to 2) consist of two side platforms serving two tracks on the second-floor ("2F") level, and the Namboku Line platforms (3 to 4) consist of an island platform serving two deep-level tracks on the sixth basement ("B6F") level.

=== Platforms ===
1
Marunouchi Line
for Tokyo, Ogikubo, and Honancho
2
Marunouchi Line
for Ikebukuro
3
Namboku Line
for Komagome and Akabane-iwabuchi
Saitama Rapid Railway Line for Urawa-misono
4
- for Shirokane-takanawa and Meguro
- Meguro Line for Hiyoshi
- Tokyu Shin-Yokohama Line for Shin-Yokohama Station
- Sotetsu Main Line for Ebina via the Tokyu/Sotetsu Shin-Yokohama Line

From March 2015, the Namboku Line platforms use the tune "Take Me Out to the Ball Game" as the departure melody, chosen as the nearby Tokyo Dome is used for baseball games.

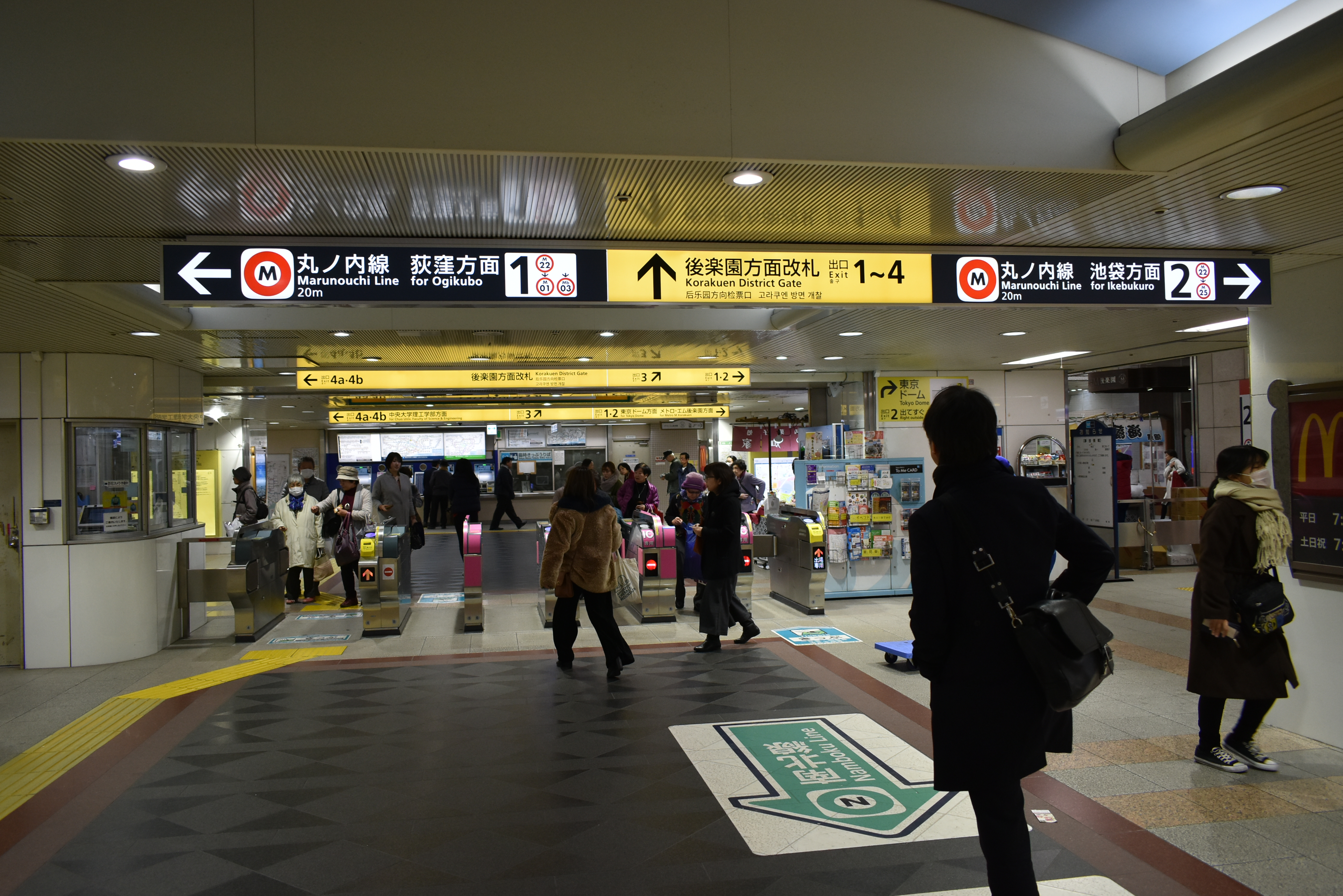
Korakuen District Gate, 2019

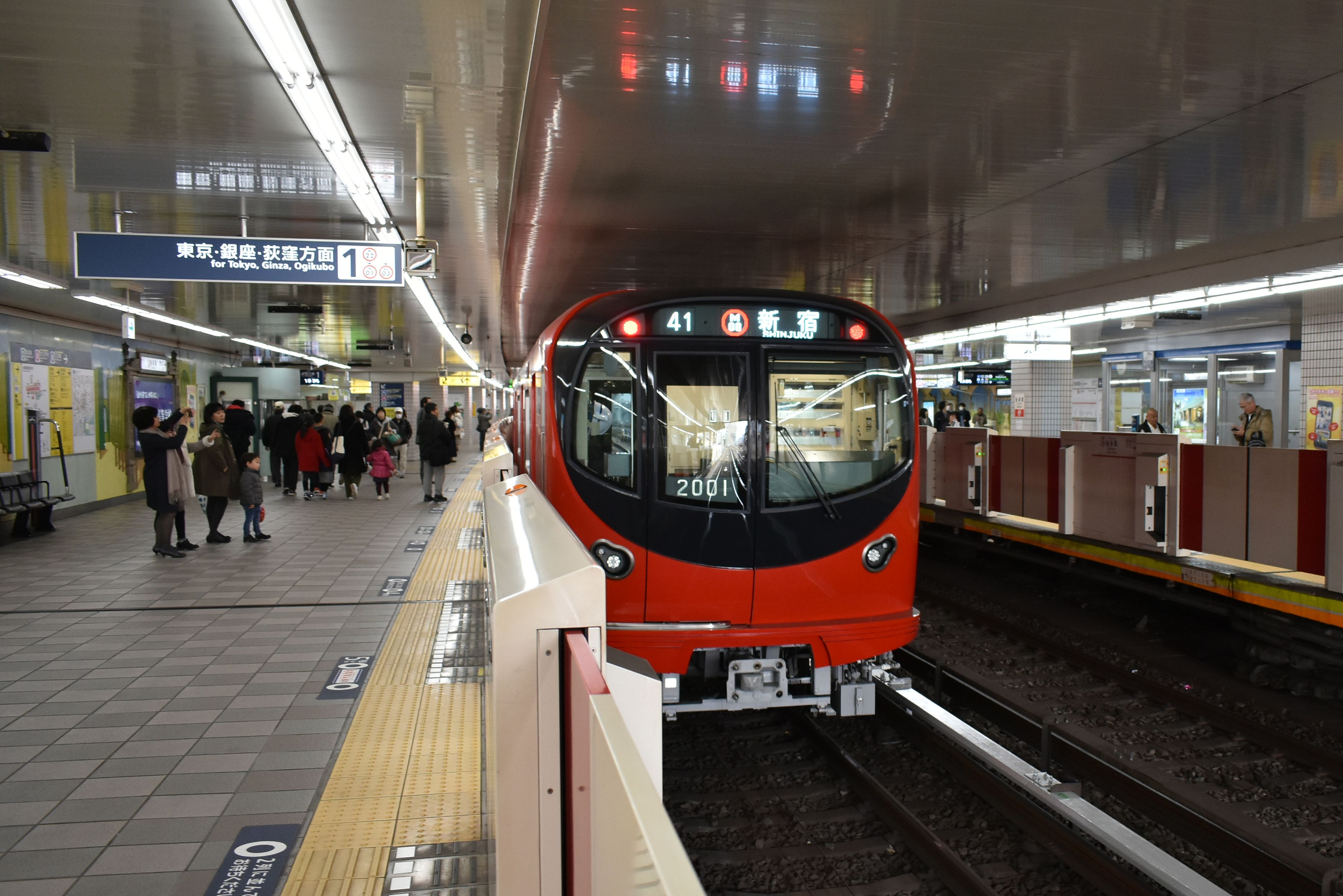
A Tokyo Metro 2000 series train at Korakuen station, 2019

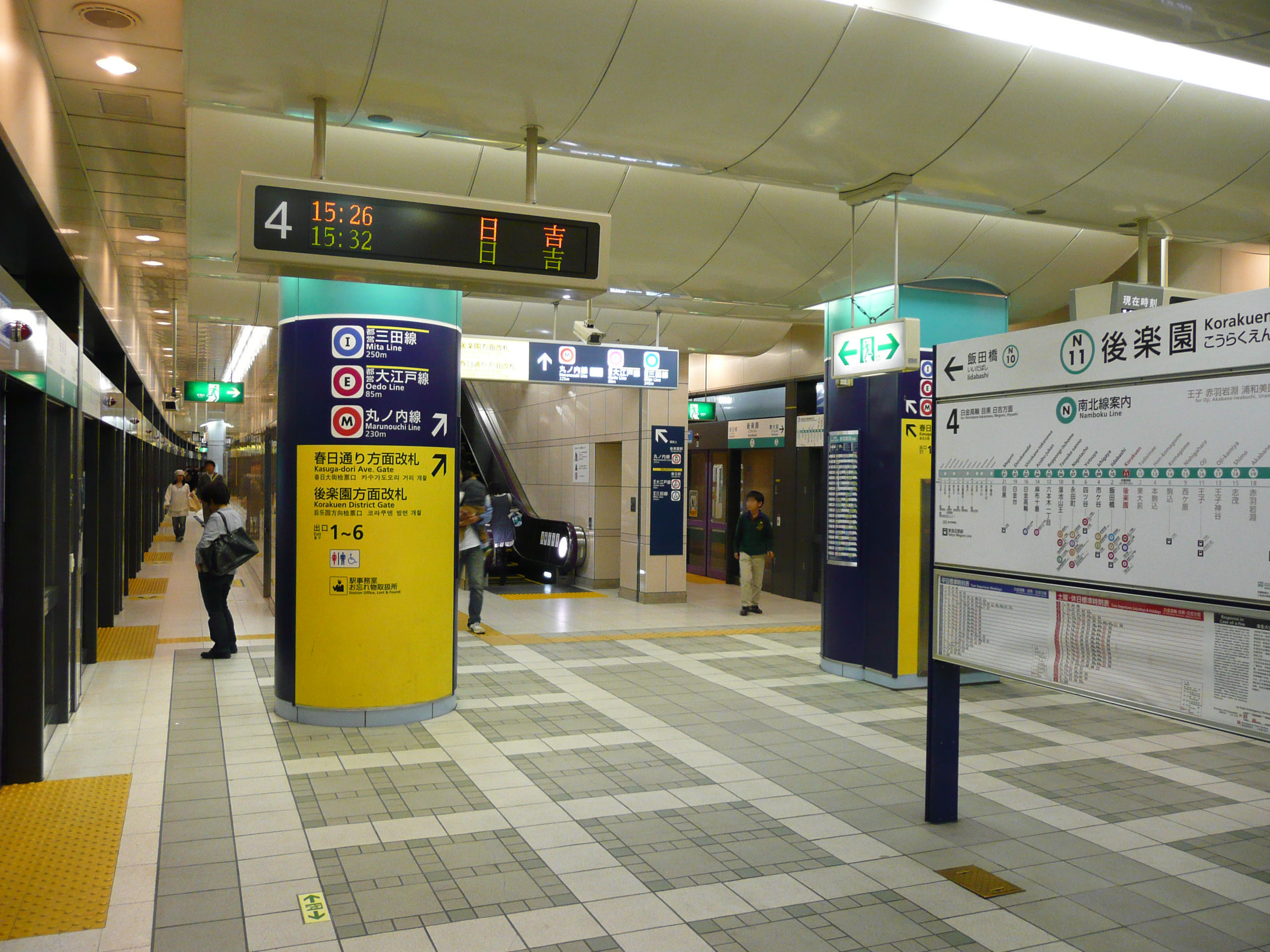
Namboku Line platforms, 2010

== Passengers ==
In fiscal 2019, this station had 106,481 passengers daily.

== History ==
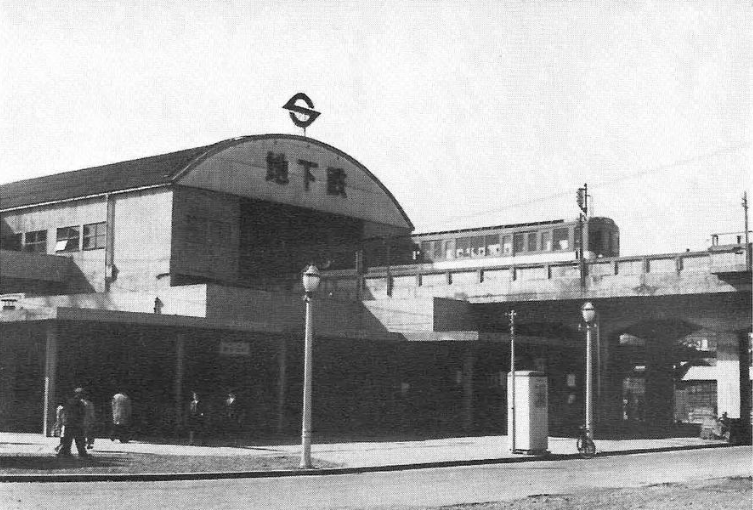
The station in 1954, operated by TRTA.

Kōrakuen Station opened on 20 January 1954 on the Marunouchi Line. The Namboku Line platforms opened on 26 March 1996.

The station facilities were inherited by Tokyo Metro after the privatization of the Teito Rapid Transit Authority (TRTA) in 2004.

From 13 March 2015, the tune "Take Me Out to the Ball Game" was used as the departure melody for the Namboku Line platforms.

== Surrounding area ==
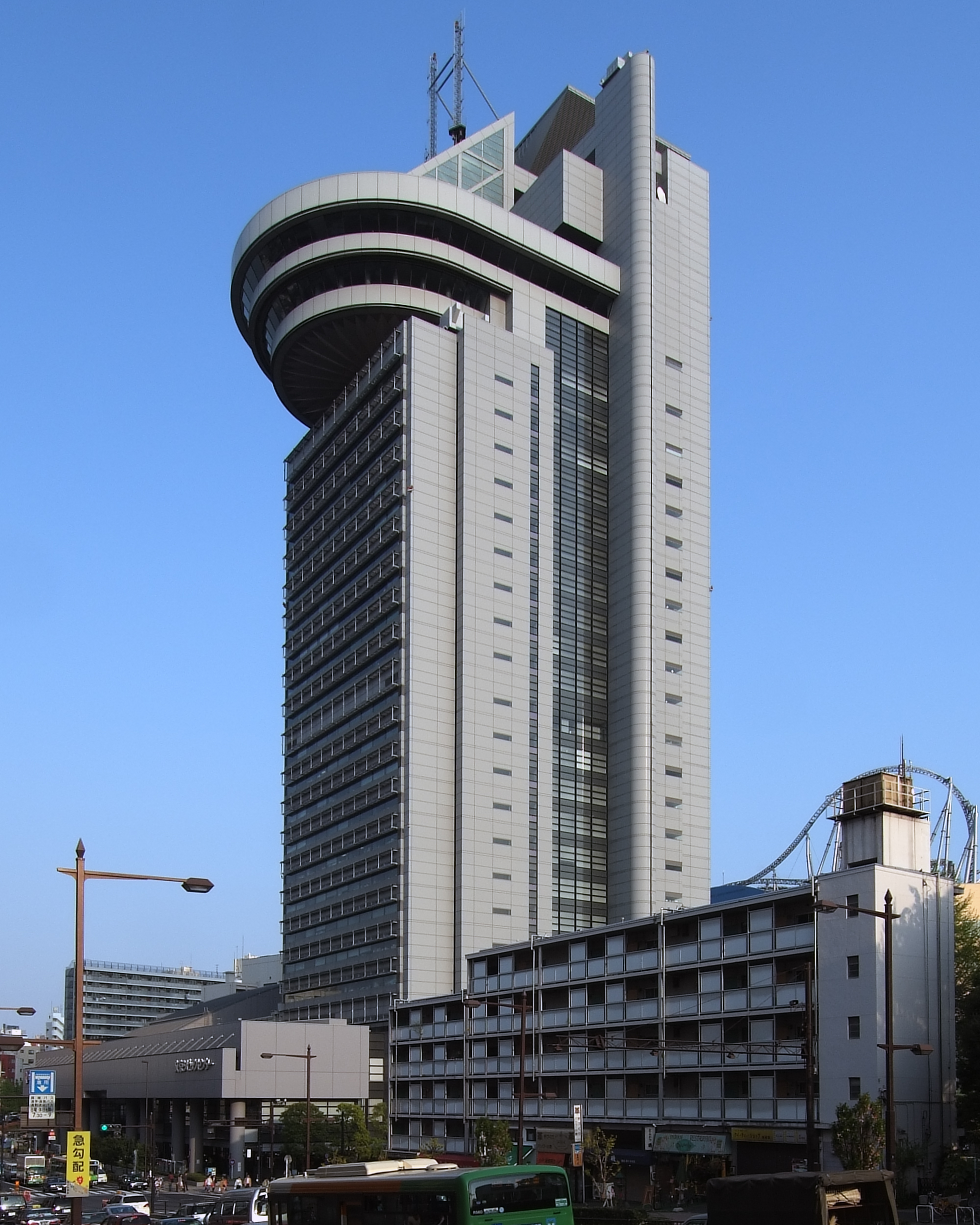
Bunkyo Ward Office building

- Bunkyo Civic Center
- Tokyo Dome City entertainment complex
  - Tokyo Dome baseball stadium
- Koishikawa Kōrakuen Garden
- Several train stations nearby:
  - Kasuga Station (Toei)
  - Suidōbashi Station (JR East, Toei)
