= Hakusan Station =

Hakusan Station (白山駅) is the name of two train stations in Japan:

- Hakusan Station (Niigata)
- Hakusan Station (Tokyo)
