= Myōgadani Station =

Metro station in Tokyo, Japan

Coordinates: 35.717275°N 139.736905°E

Myōgadani Station 茗荷谷駅

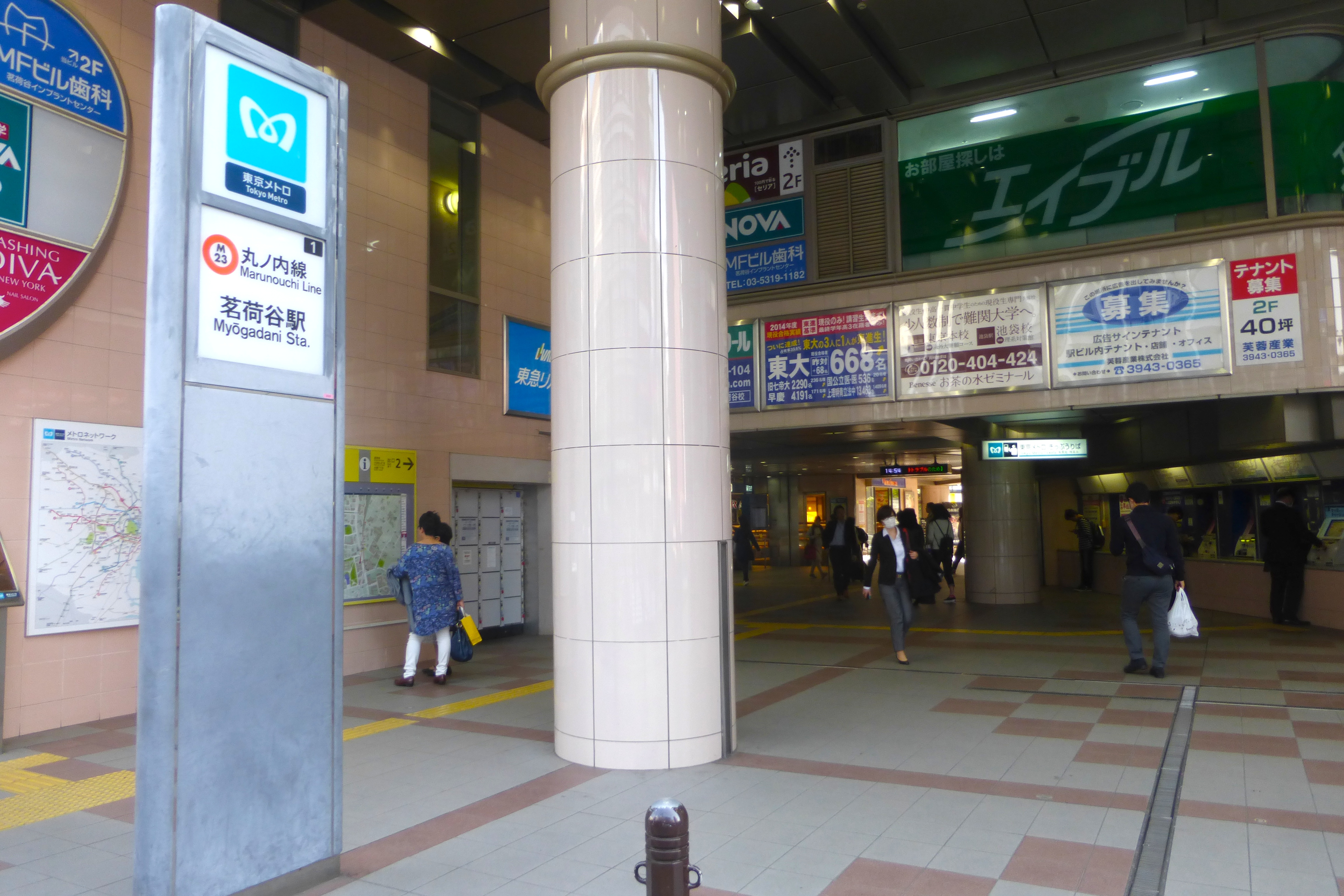
- The main entrance (entrance No. 1), March 2015

General information
- Location: 4-6-15 Kohinata, Bunkyō, Tokyo （東京都文京区小日向4-6-15） Japan
- Operator: Tokyo Metro
- Line: Marunouchi Line
- Platforms: 2 side platforms
- Tracks: 2
- Connections: Bus stop

Construction
- Structure type: Subsurface

Other information
- Station code: M-23

History
- Opened: 20 January 1954

Passengers
- FY2011: 66,404 daily

Services
Preceding station	Tokyo Metro	Following station
Kōrakuen towards Ogikubo or Hōnanchō	Marunouchi Line	Shin-ōtsuka towards Ikebukuro
Location
- Location within Tokyo Yamanote Loop Location within Tokyo wards area Location within Japan

Myōgadani Station (茗荷谷駅, Myōgadani-eki) is a subway station on the Tokyo Metro Marunouchi Line in Bunkyō, operated by the Tokyo subway operator Tokyo Metro. It is numbered M-23.

== Lines ==
Myōgadani Station is served by the Tokyo Metro Marunouchi Line, which runs between Ogikubo and Ikebukuro.

== Station layout ==
The station consists of two open-air side platforms on the first basement ("B1F") level serving two tracks. The station entrance is located at ground level.

=== Platforms ===
1	Marunouchi Line	for Tokyo, Shinjuku, and Ogikubo
2	Marunouchi Line	for Ikebukuro

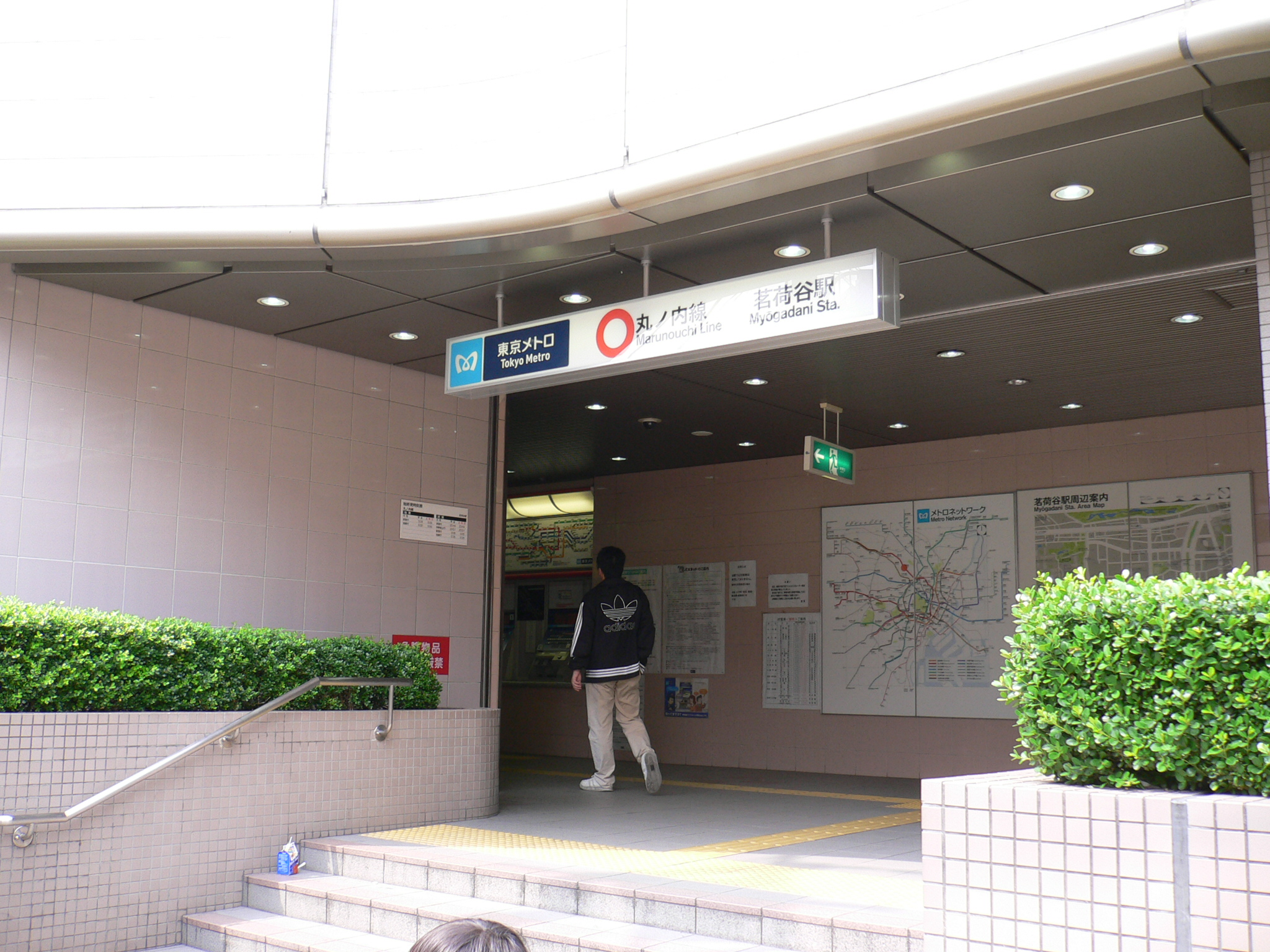
Entrance No. 3, June 2005

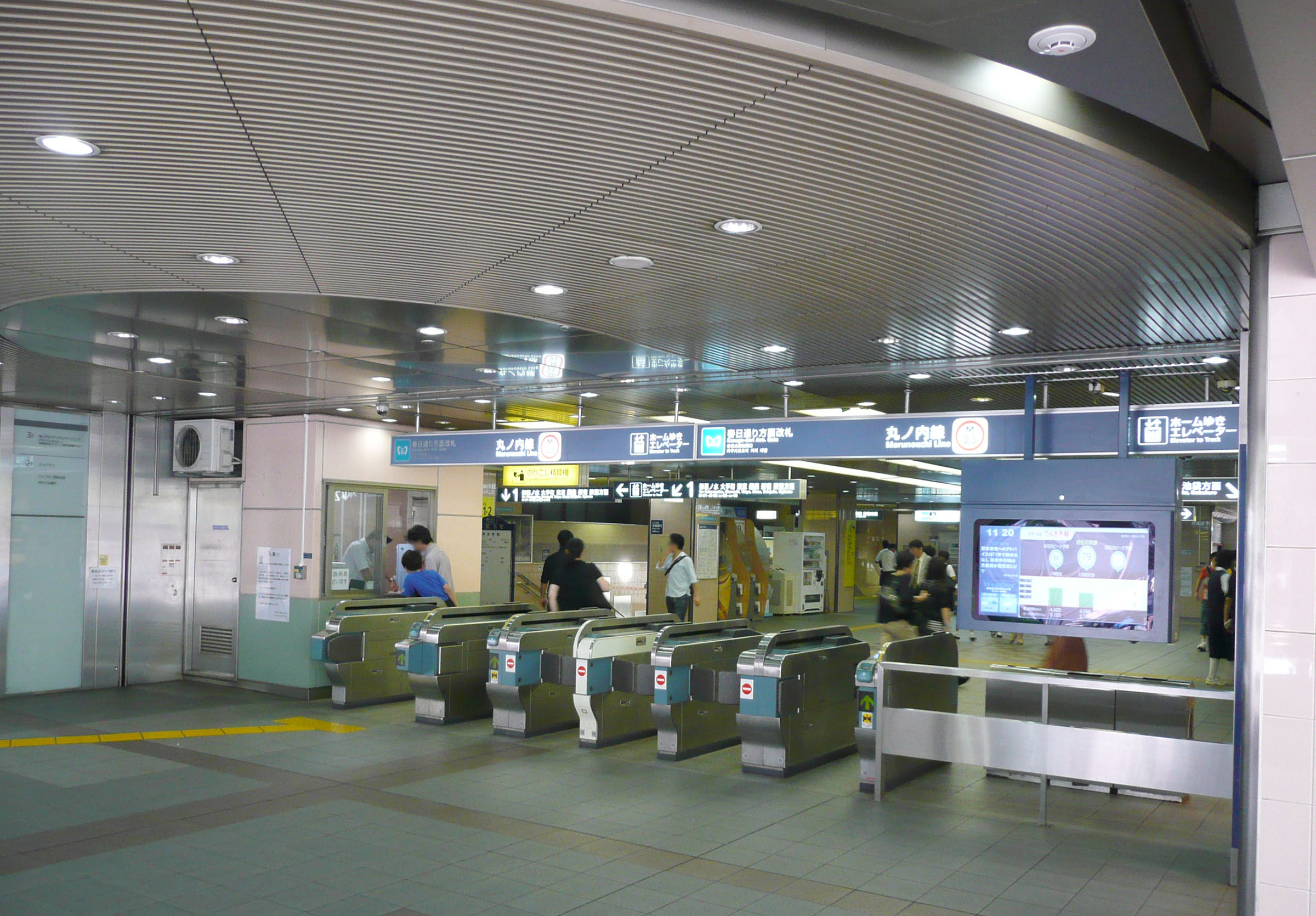
The ticket barriers, September 2011

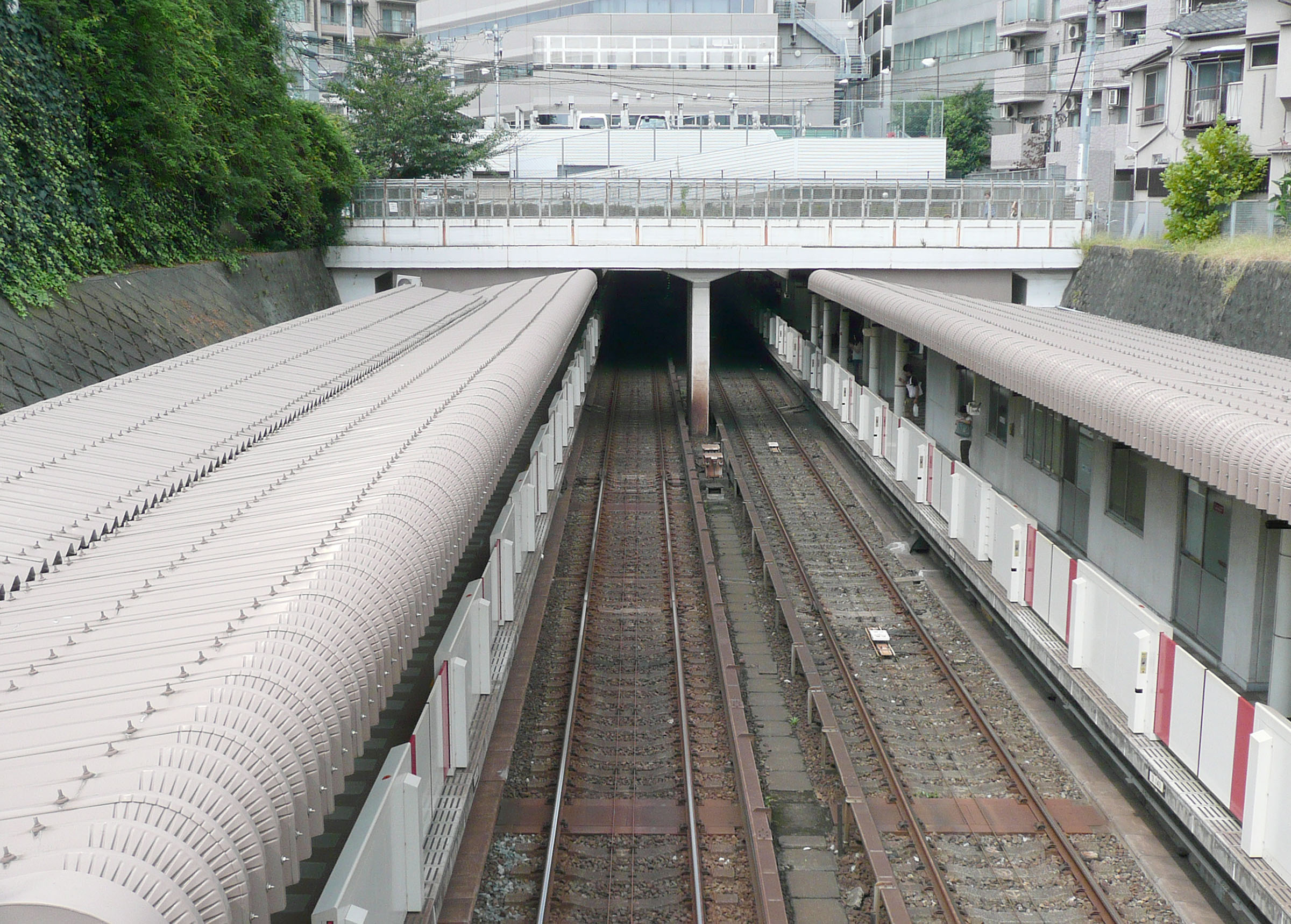
Overview of the platforms, September 2011

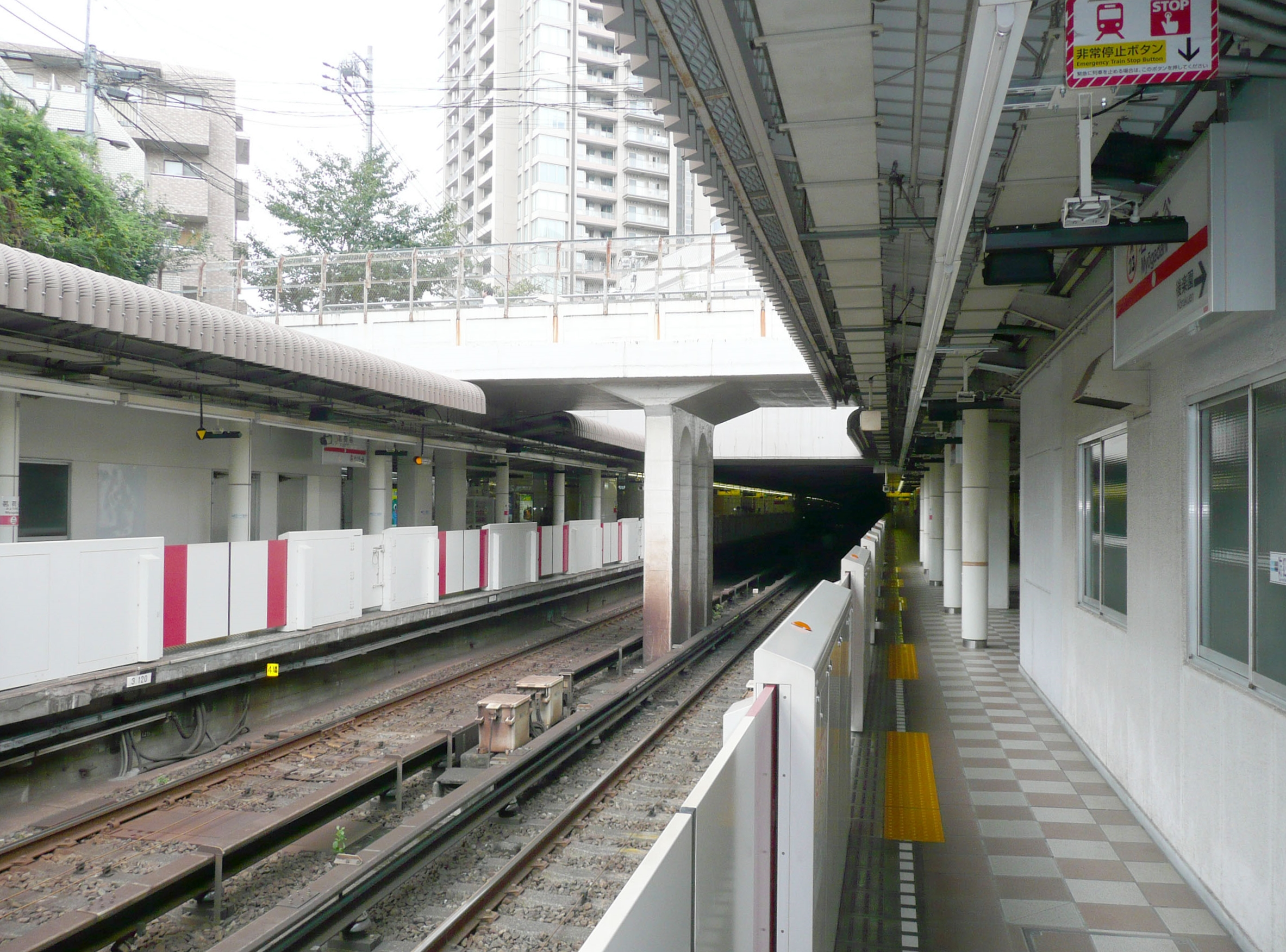
The station platforms, September 2011

== History ==
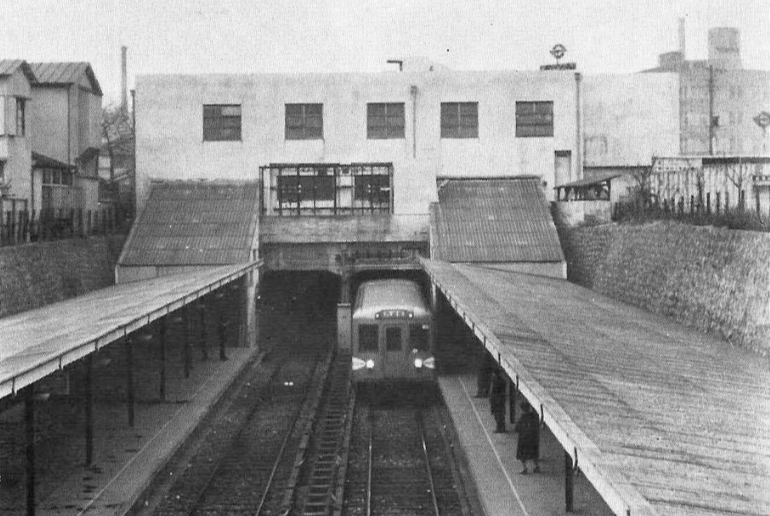
The station in 1954, operated by TRTA

Myōgadani station opened on 20 January 1954, when the first section of the Marunouchi Line from Ikebukuro to Ochanomizu opened.

The station facilities were inherited by Tokyo Metro after the privatization of the Teito Rapid Transit Authority (TRTA) in 2004.

== Passenger statistics ==
In fiscal 2011, the station was used by an average of 66,404 passengers daily.

== Surrounding area ==
- Atomi University Bunkyo campus
- Ochanomizu University
- Takushoku University Bunkyo campus
- University of Tsukuba Bunkyo campus

Although it is centrally located, two stops from the mojor hub of Ikebukuro, Myōgadani Station is in a central location but serves the mainly residential area of Koishikawa and is seldom busy outside rush hour. Surrounding the station is a small commercial area with a few shops, supermarkets, izakayas and restaurants. It is close to several of Tokyo's universities, including Ochanomizu University and the University of Tsukuba. It is also close to the Koishikawa Botanical Garden, which is affiliated with the University of Tokyo.

The residential area just to the north of Kasuga-dori, on which the station is situated, has many parks and green belts, which is unusual for such a central neighbourhood. Tokyo's printing district is another point of interest in the area. Just south of the Koishikawa Botanical Garden is a neighbourhood of small printing shops, many of them converted houses on narrow streets which sometimes become congested with forklifts and trucks delivering paper and printed material.

== See also ==
- List of railway stations in Japan
