= Sengoku Station =

Metro station in Tokyo, Japan

Coordinates: 35.7281°N 139.7450°E

Sengoku Station 千石駅

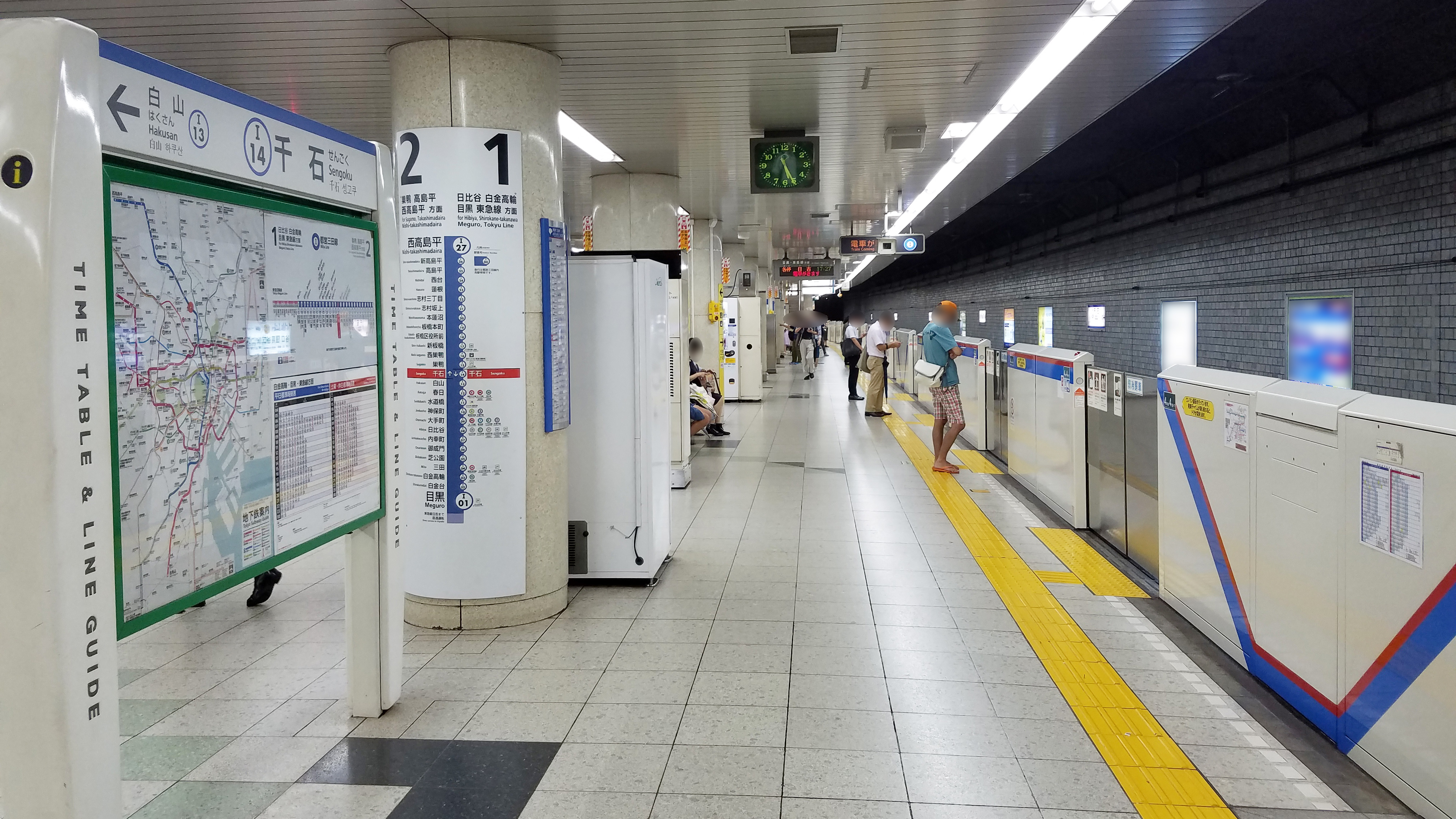
- The station platforms

General information
- Location: 29-13 Sengoku 1-chome, Bunkyō City, Tokyo; Japan
- Operator: Toei Subway
- Line: Mita Line
- Platforms: 1 island platform
- Tracks: 2

Construction
- Structure type: Underground

Other information
- Station code: I-14

History
- Opened: 30 June 1972; 54 years ago

Services
Preceding station	Toei Subway	Following station
Sugamo towards Nishi-takashimadaira	Mita Line	Hakusan towards Meguro
Location
- Location within Tokyo Yamanote Loop Location within Tokyo wards area Location within Japan

Sengoku Station (千石駅, Sengoku eki) is a subway station on the Toei Mita Line in Bunkyo, Tokyo, Japan, operated by the Tokyo subway operator Tokyo Metropolitan Bureau of Transportation (Toei). It is numbered "I-14"

== Lines and area ==
Sengoku Station is served by the Toei Mita Line. It is the nearest station to dining out in Ikebukuro. It is also the closest Toei station to the Rikugien Gardens.

== Layout ==
The station has one island platform serving two tracks. The station lies underneath Hakusan-dori and spans the space roughly from the Shinobazu-dori and Hakusan-dori crossing in the north-west to the branch of Hakusan-dori and Kyu-hakusan-dori in the south-east.

=== Platforms ===
1
2
Mita Line
Mita Line
- for Shirokane-takanawa and Meguro
- Meguro Line for Musashi-Kosugi and Hiyoshi
- Sotetsu Main Line for Ebina via the Tokyu/Sotetsu Shin-Yokohama Line
- Sotetsu Izumino Line for Shōnandai via the Tokyu/Sotetsu Shin-Yokohama Line
for Sugamo and Nishi-Takashimadaira

== History ==
The station opened on 30 June 1972.

== See also ==
- List of railway stations in Japan
