= Hongō-sanchōme Station =

Metro station in Tokyo, Japan

Coordinates: 35.706728°N 139.759891°E

Hongō-sanchōme Station 本郷三丁目駅

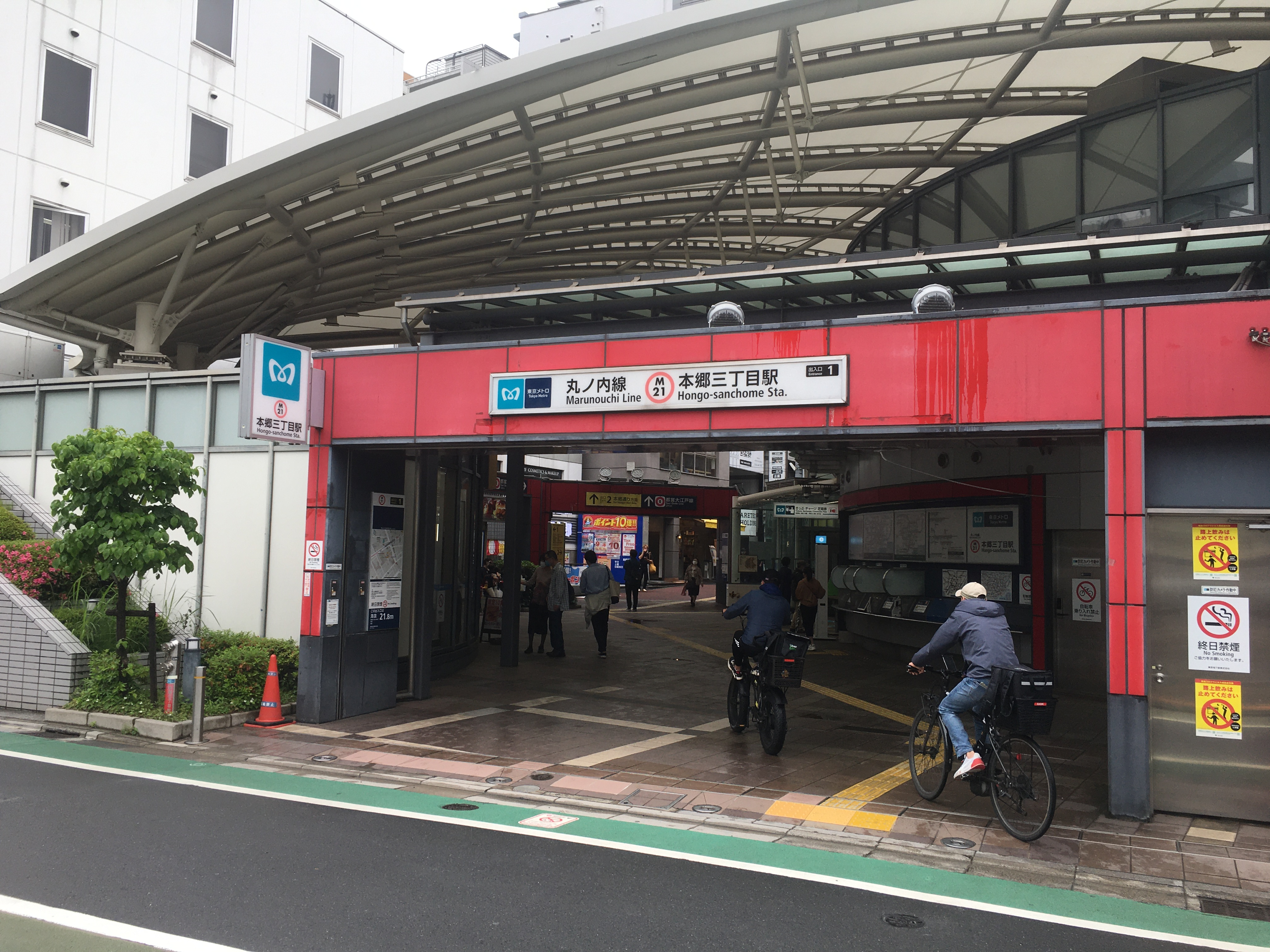
- Exit 1 of Tokyo Metro in May 2022

General information
- Location: Bunkyō, Tokyo; Japan
- Operator: Tokyo Metro; Toei Subway
- Lines: Marunouchi Line; Ōedo Line
- Platforms: 1 island platform (Ōedo Line); 2 side platforms (Marunouchi Line)
- Tracks: 4 (2 for each line)

Construction
- Structure type: Underground

Other information
- Station code: M-21, E-08

History
- Opened: 20 January 1954; 72 years ago

Services
Preceding station	Tokyo Metro	Following station
Ochanomizu towards Ogikubo or Hōnanchō	Marunouchi Line	Kōrakuen towards Ikebukuro
Preceding station	Toei Subway	Following station
Kasuga towards Tochōmae	Ōedo Line	Ueno-Okachimachi towards Hikarigaoka
Location
- Location within Tokyo Yamanote Loop Location within Tokyo wards area Location within Japan

Hongō-sanchōme Station (本郷三丁目駅, Hongō-sanchōme-eki) is a railway station in Bunkyō, Tokyo, Japan, jointly operated by the Tokyo subway operators Tokyo Metro and Toei Subway. Part of the station originally lay within the Hongō-sanchōme district of Bunkyō Ward when the station was first opened, but following rezoning in 1965, the address of the station became Hongō-nichōme.

== Lines ==
- Tokyo Metro Marunouchi Line, station number M-21
- Toei Ōedo Line, station number E-08

== Station layout ==
The station has two separate sections. There is no underground connection between the platforms, so transfers require surfacing and re-entering. It is easier to change at Kōrakuen.

=== Tokyo Metro ===
The Tokyo Metro section of the station is composed of two side platforms serving two tracks.

1	Marunouchi Line	for Ōtemachi, Shinjuku, and Ogikubo
2	Marunouchi Line	for Kōrakuen and Ikebukuro

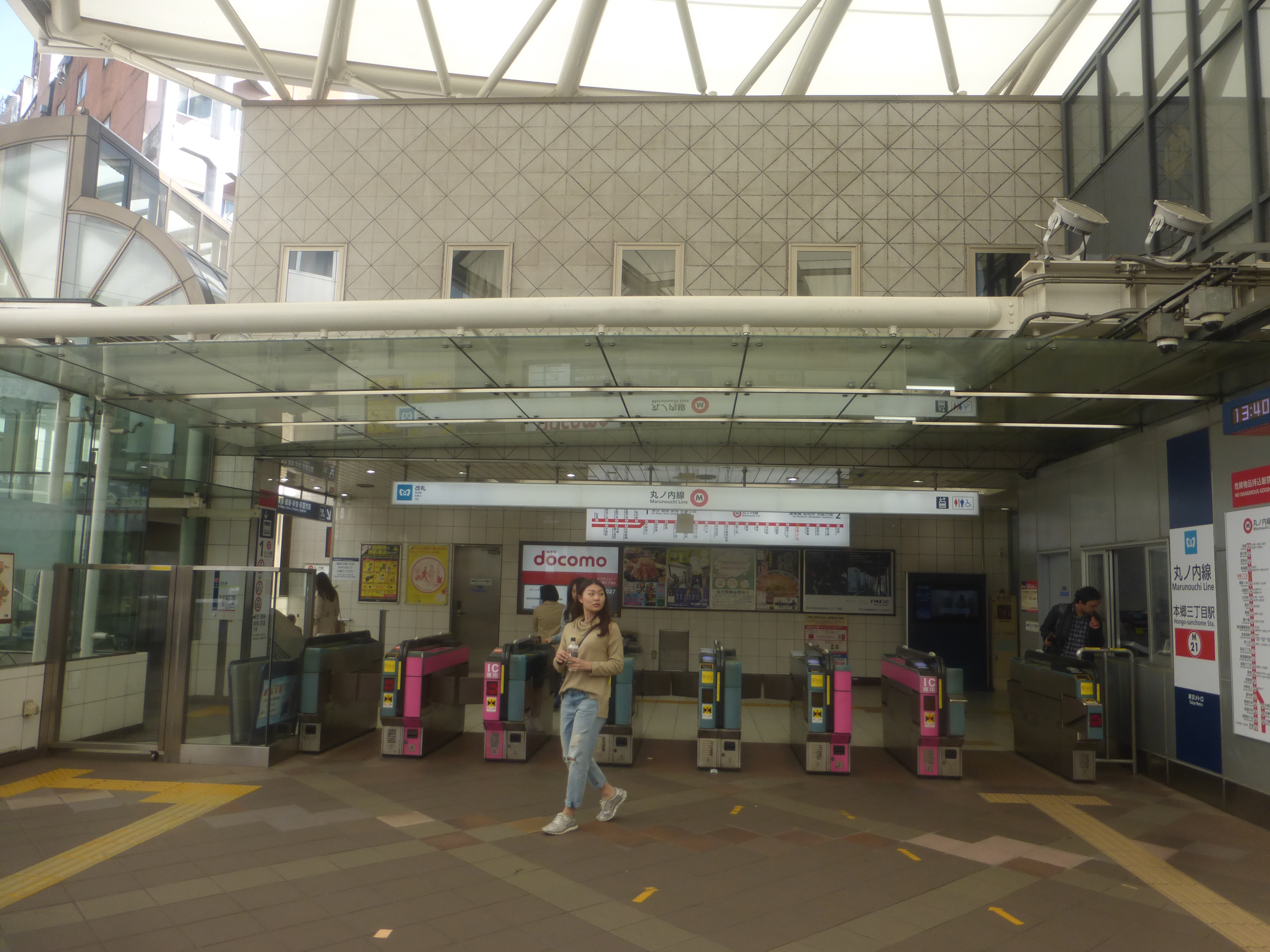
Marunouchi Line ticket gates, 2018

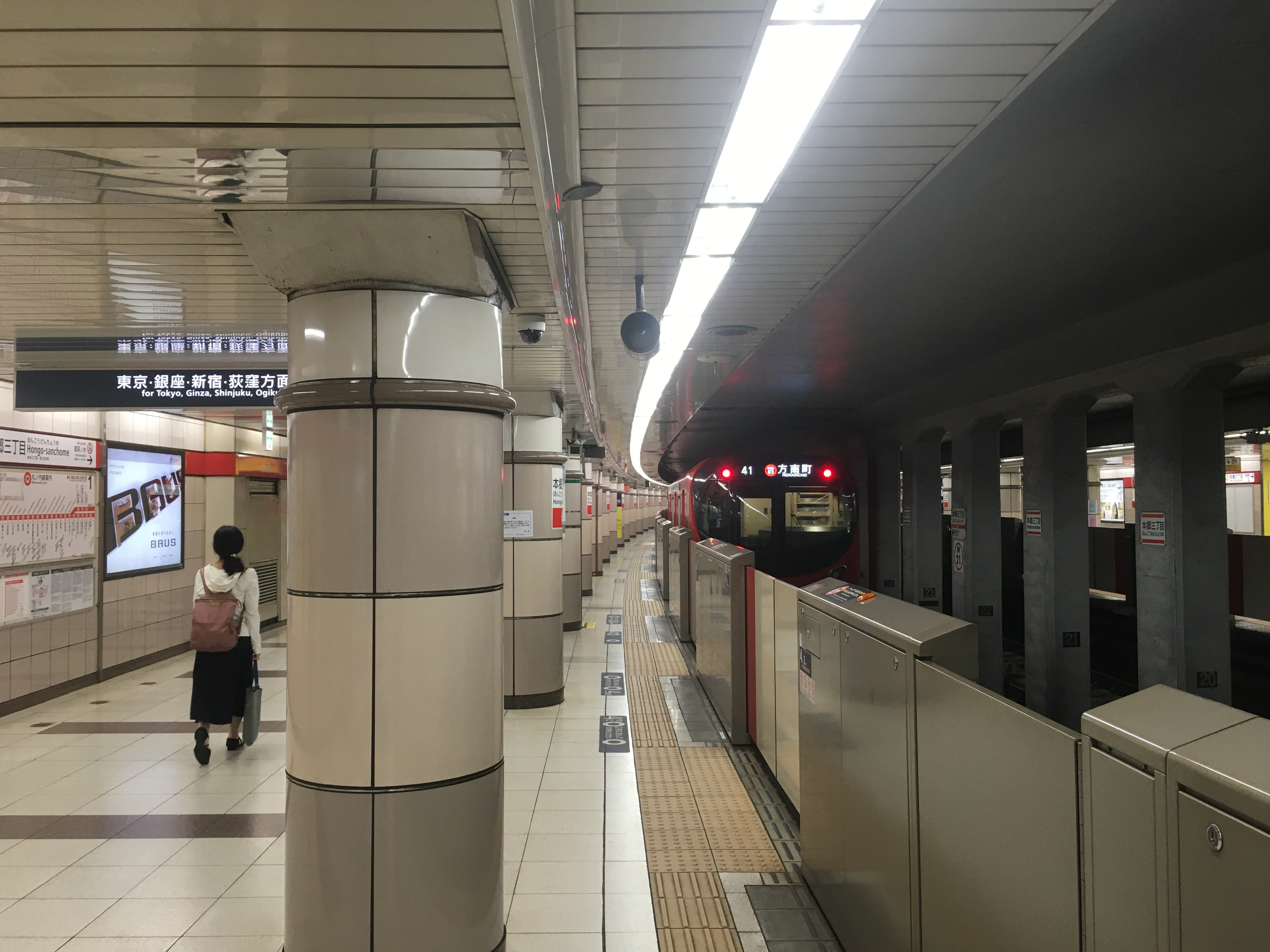
Marunouchi Line platforms, 2022

=== Toei ===
The Toei section of the station is composed of a single island platform serving two tracks.

1	Ōedo Line	for Iidabashi and Tochōmae
2	Ōedo Line	for Ryōgoku and Daimon

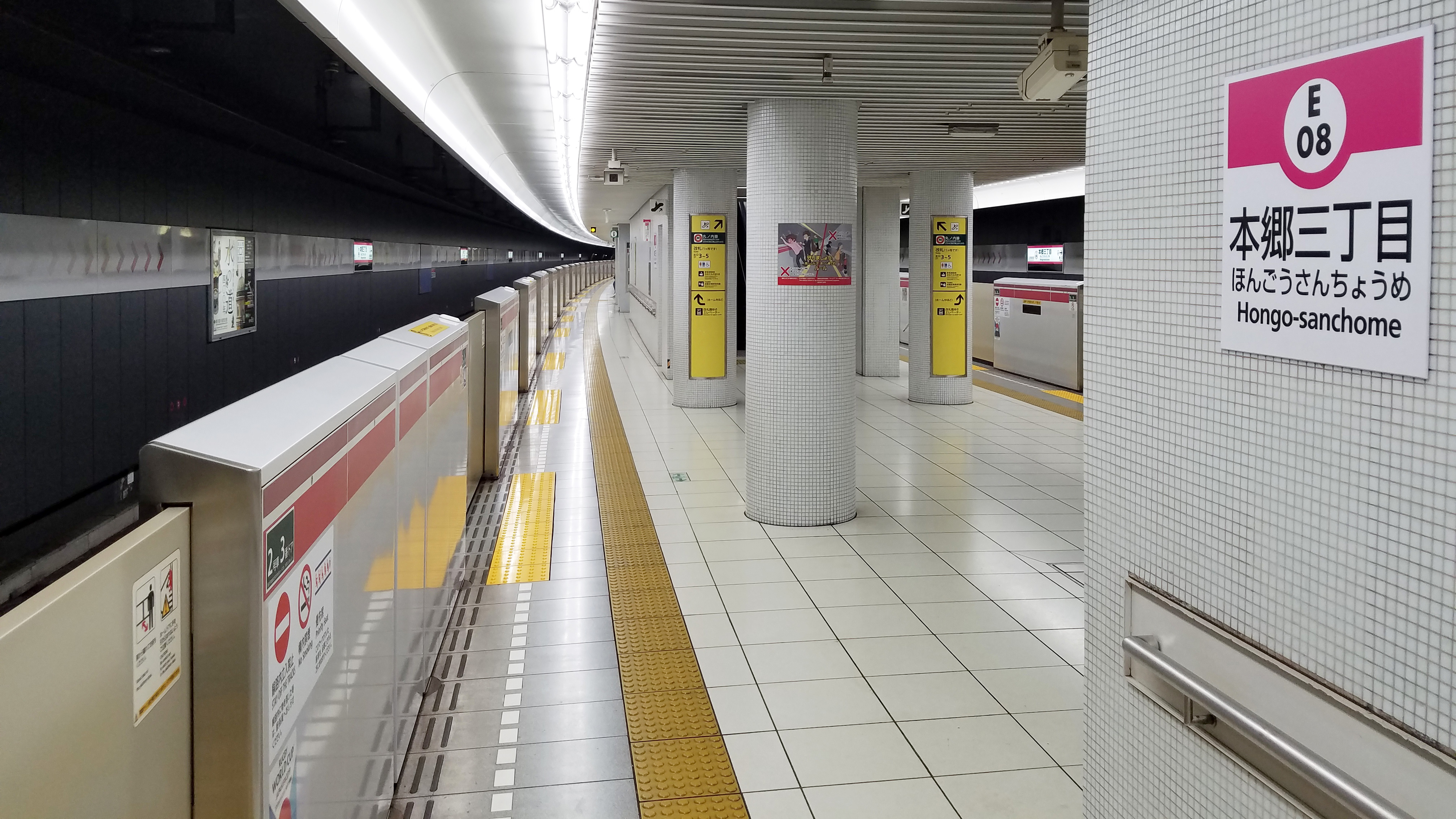
Oedo Line platform, 2019

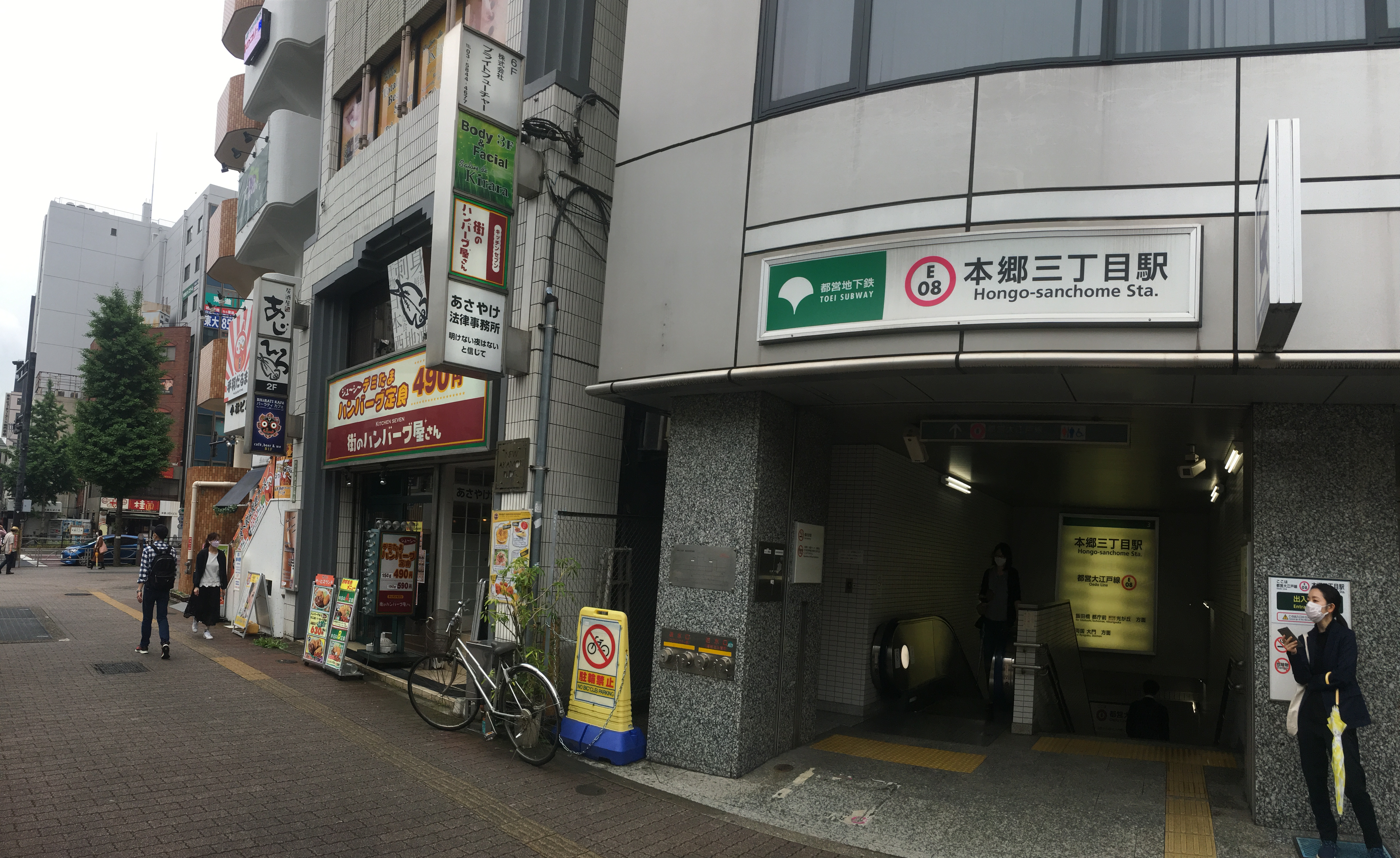
Entrance, 2022

== History ==
- 20 January 1954: The Marunouchi Line station opens.
- 1 April 1965: The station address becomes Hongō-nichōme.
- 12 December 2000: The Toei Ōedo Line station opens.
- 1 April 2004: The station facilities of the Marunouchi Line were inherited by Tokyo Metro after the privatization of the Teito Rapid Transit Authority (TRTA) in 2004.
