= Hakusan Station (Tokyo) =

Metro station in Tokyo, Japan

Coordinates: 35.72133°N 139.752078°E

Hakusan Station 白山駅

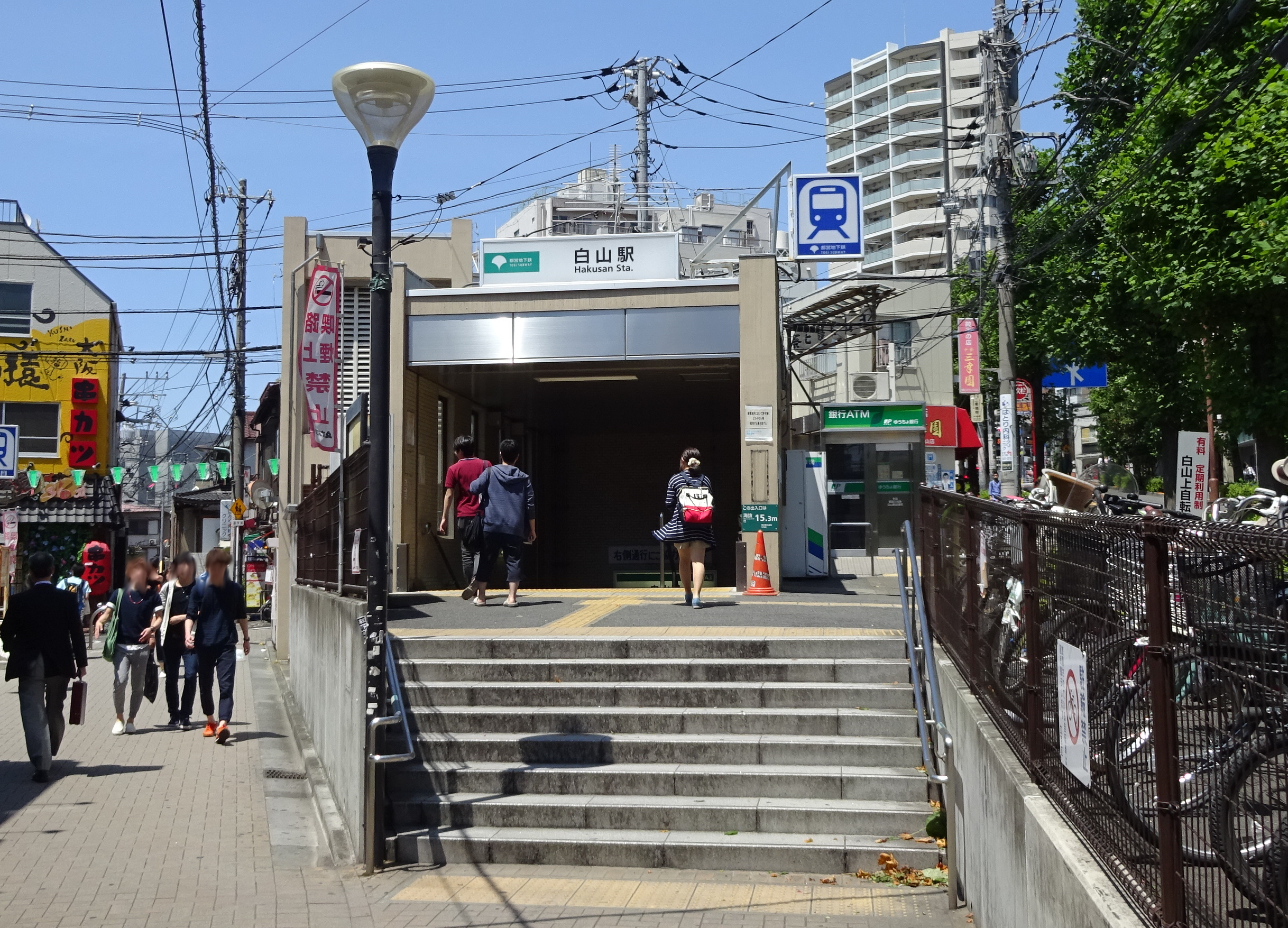
- Entrance A3 in June 2016

General information
- Location: 5-36-10 Hakusan, Bunkyō City, Tokyo; Japan
- Operator: Toei Subway
- Line: Mita Line
- Platforms: 2 side platforms
- Tracks: 2

Construction
- Structure type: Underground
- Accessible: Yes

Other information
- Station code: I-13
- Website: Official website

History
- Opened: 30 June 1972; 54 years ago

Services
Preceding station	Toei Subway	Following station
Sengoku towards Nishi-takashimadaira	Mita Line	Kasuga towards Meguro
Location
- Location within Tokyo Yamanote Loop Location within Tokyo wards area Location within Japan

Hakusan Station (白山駅, Hakusan-eki) is a subway station on the Toei Mita Line in Bunkyo, Tokyo, Japan, operated by Toei Subway.

== Lines ==
Hakusan Station is served by the Toei Mita Line, and is numbered I-13.

== Station layout ==
The station has two opposite side platforms serving two tracks.

=== Platforms ===
1
2
Mita Line
Mita Line
- for Shirokane-takanawa and Meguro
- Meguro Line for Musashi-Kosugi and Hiyoshi
- Sotetsu Main Line for Ebina via the Tokyu/Sotetsu Shin-Yokohama Line
- Sotetsu Izumino Line for Shōnandai via the Tokyu/Sotetsu Shin-Yokohama Line
for Sugamo and Nishi-takashimadaira

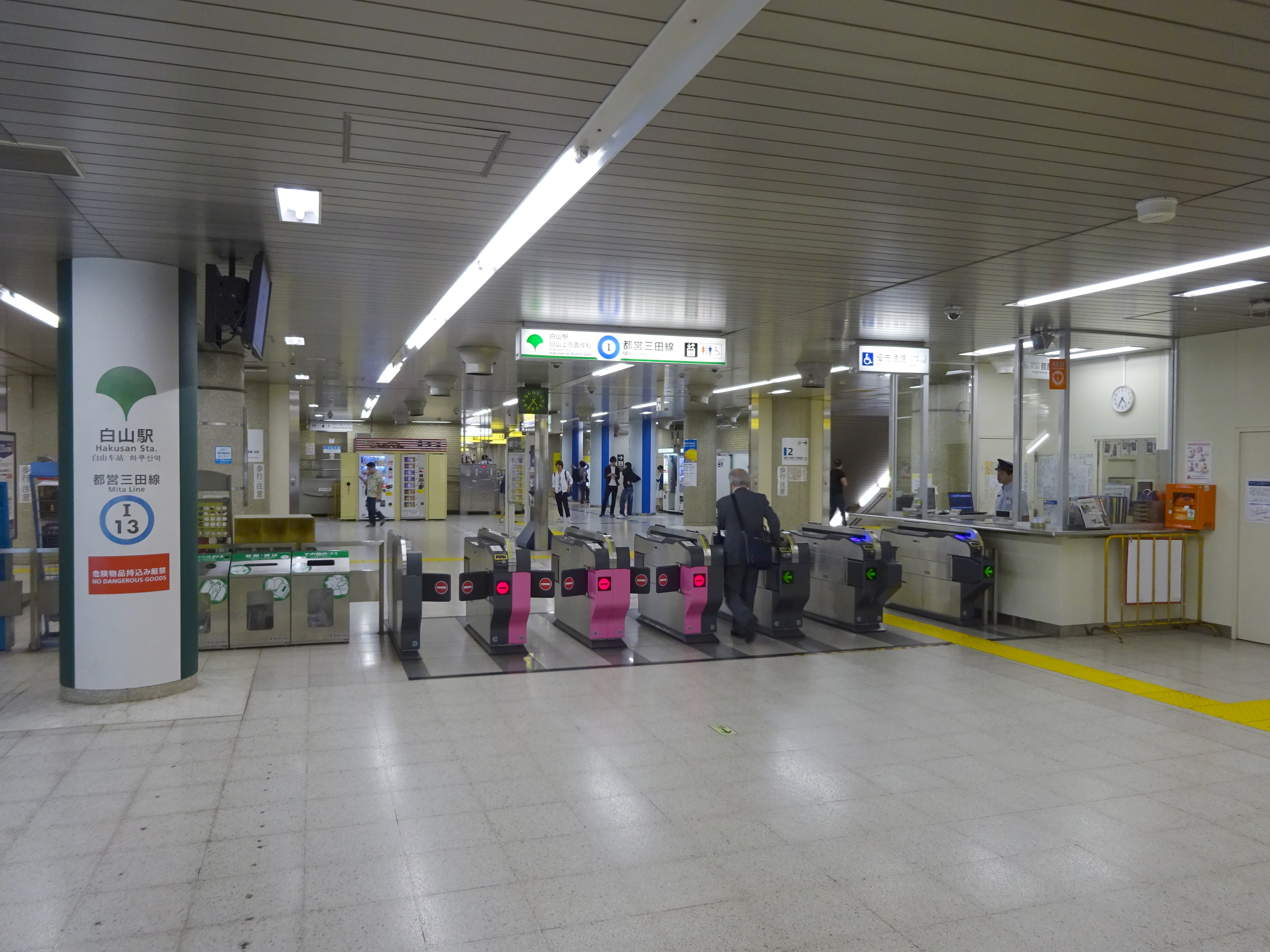
Ticket gates, 2016

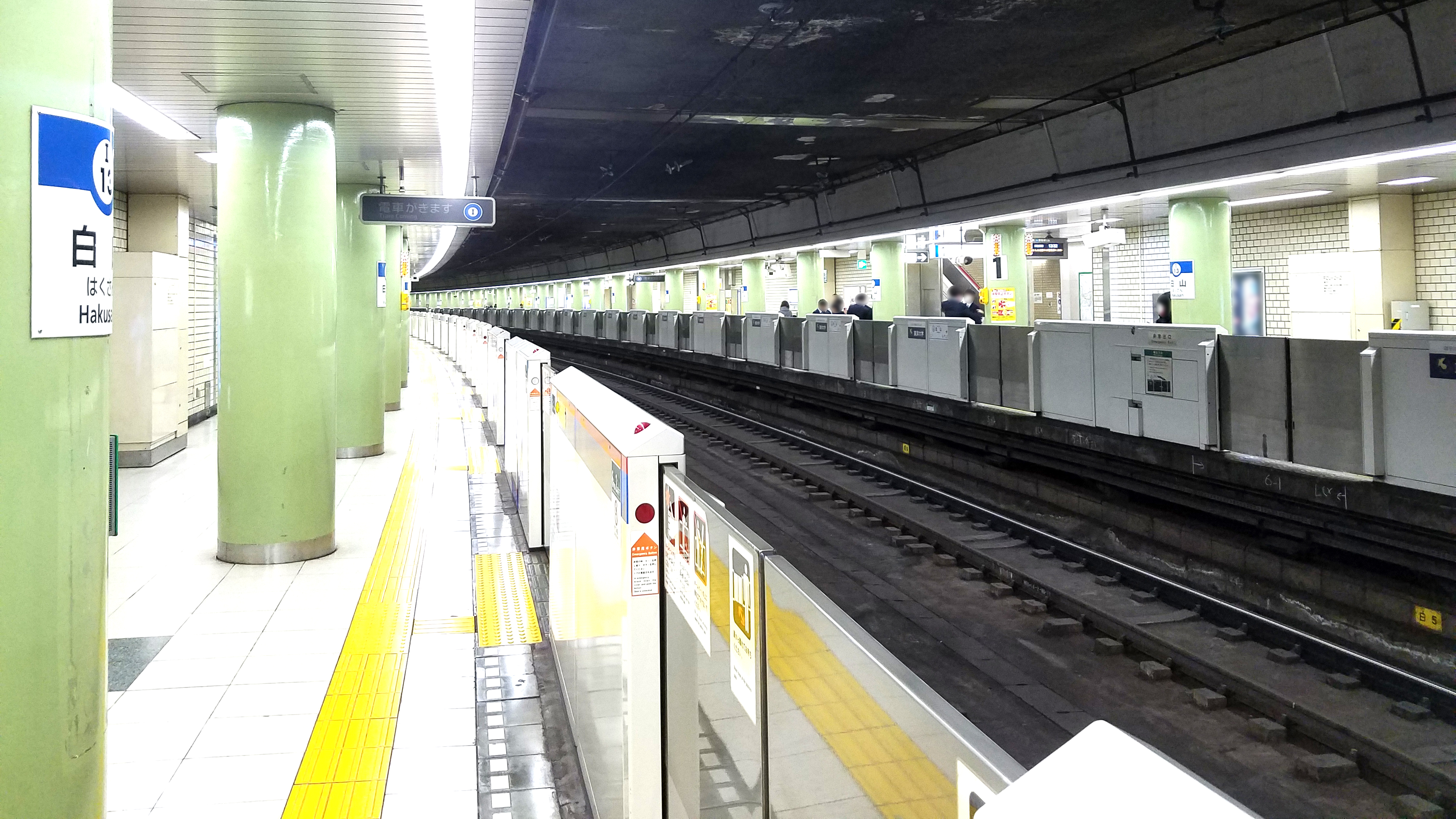
Platforms, December 2019

== History ==
Hakusan Station opened on 30 June 1972. As of 2013, many restaurants had gone bankrupt and collapsed due to the town's rapidly ageing population.

== See also ==
- List of railway stations in Japan
