= Kasuga Station (Tokyo) =

Metro station in Tokyo, Japan

Coordinates: 35°42′35″N 139°45′12″E

Kasuga Station 春日駅

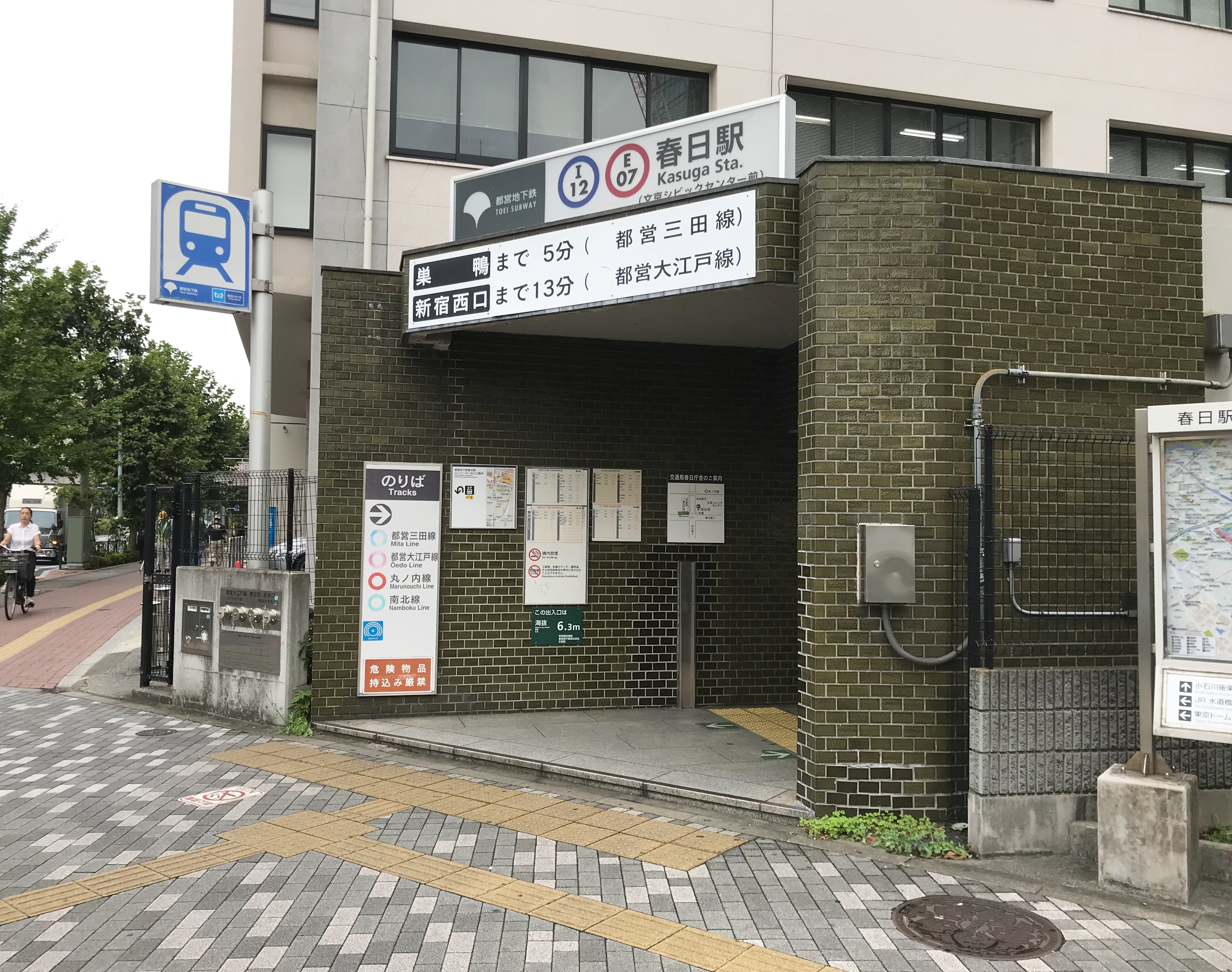
- Entrance A1

General information
- Location: 4-15-16 Hongo (Mita Line); 1-16-17 Kasuga (Toei Ōedo Line); Bunkyō City, Tokyo; Japan
- Operator: Toei Subway
- Lines: Mita Line; Ōedo Line
- Platforms: 2 side platforms (Mita Line); 1 island platform (Ōedo)
- Tracks: 4 (2 for each line)
- Connections: Korakuen

Construction
- Structure type: Underground

Other information
- Station code: I12, E07

History
- Opened: 30 June 1972; 54 years ago

Passengers
- 27,695 (Mita Line), 31,657 (Oedo Line) daily

Services
Preceding station	Toei Subway	Following station
Hakusan towards Nishi-takashimadaira	Mita Line	Suidobashi towards Meguro
Iidabashi towards Tochōmae	Ōedo Line	Hongō-sanchōme towards Hikarigaoka
Location
- Location within Tokyo Yamanote Loop Location within Tokyo wards area Location within Japan

Kasuga Station (春日駅, Kasuga-eki) is a subway station in Bunkyo, Tokyo, Japan, operated by Toei Subway. It is located next to Kōrakuen Station on the Tokyo Metro Marunouchi Line and Tokyo Metro Namboku Line. It is built under the Bunkyo City Office building.

== Lines ==
Kasuga Station is served by the following two lines.

- Toei Mita Line (I-12)
- Toei Oedo Line (E-07)

== Station layout ==
Kasuga Station has nine exits.

=== Platforms ===
1
Mita Line
- for Shirokane-takanawa and Meguro
- Meguro Line for Musashi-Kosugi and Hiyoshi
- Sotetsu Main Line for Ebina via the Tokyu/Sotetsu Shin-Yokohama Line
- Sotetsu Izumino Line for Shōnandai via the Tokyu/Sotetsu Shin-Yokohama Line
2
Mita Line
Sugamo and Nishi-Takashimadaira
3
Ōedo Line
for Iidabashi, Tochōmae, and Hikarigaoka
4
Ōedo Line
for Ryōgoku, and Daimon

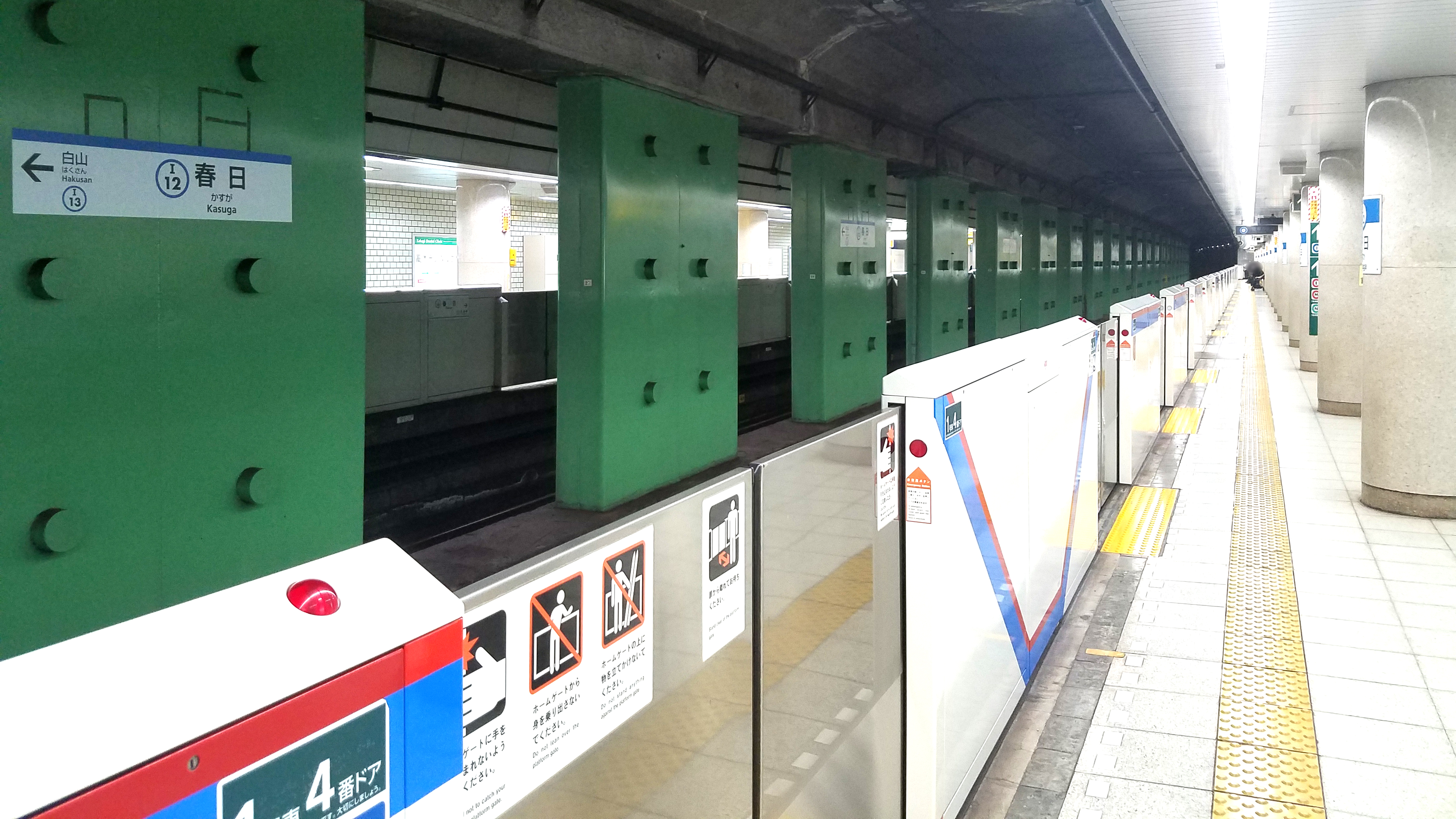
Mita Line platforms, 2019

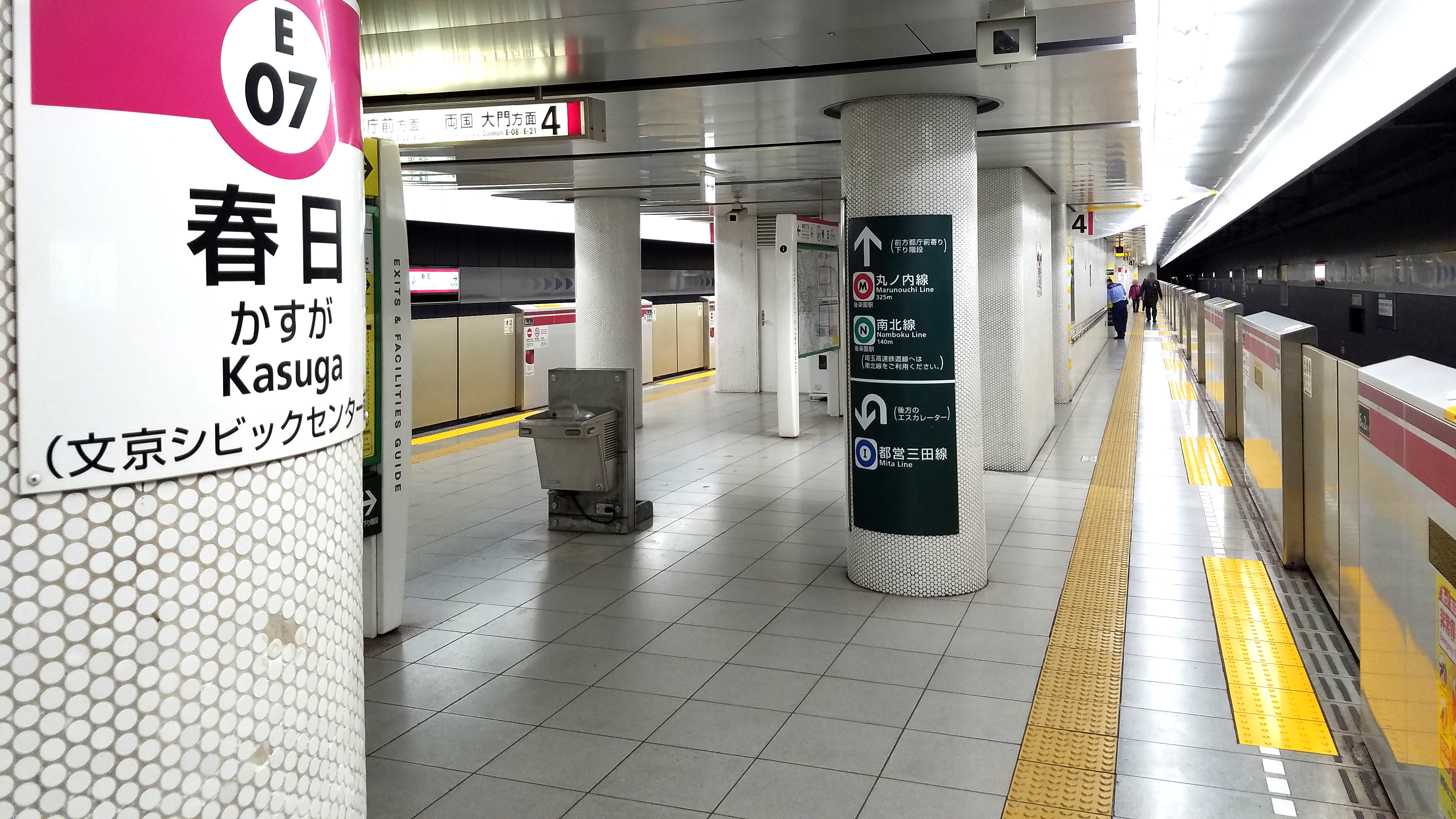
Oedo Line platforms, 2019

== History ==
The station first opened on 30 June 1971, served by the Toei Mita Line. The Toei Oedo Line station opened on 12 December 2000.

== Surrounding area ==
- Kōrakuen Station

== See also ==
- List of railway stations in Japan
