= Suidōbashi Station =

Railway and metro station in Tokyo, Japan

Suidōbashi Station 水道橋駅
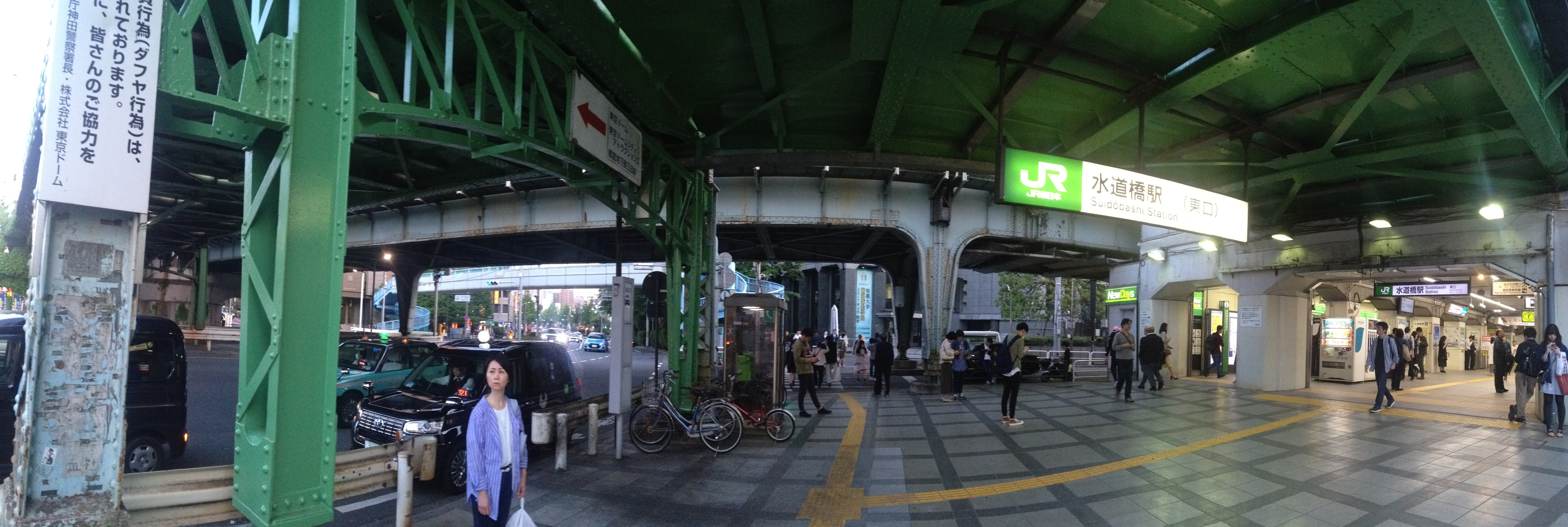
- JR East exit, 2018

General information
- Location: Chiyoda and Bunkyō, Tokyo; Japan
- Coordinates: 35.702°N 139.754°E
- Operator: JR East; Toei Subway
- Lines: Chūō-Sōbu Line; Mita Line
- Connections: Bus stop
Location
- Location within Tokyo Yamanote Loop Location within Tokyo wards area Location within Japan

Suidōbashi Station (水道橋駅, Suidōbashi-eki) is a railway station which straddles Tokyo's Chiyoda and Bunkyō wards, operated jointly by East Japan Railway Company (JR East) and Tokyo Metropolitan Bureau of Transportation (Toei).

== Lines ==
Suidōbashi Station is served by the following lines:

- East Japan Railway Company
  - Chūō-Sōbu Line
- Toei Subway
  - Toei Mita Line

== Station layout ==
Suidōbashi Station is divided into two parts: the JR East station and the Toei Subway station. There is no direct passage between the JR and Toei platforms.

== JR East ==
JB17 Suidōbashi Station 水道橋駅
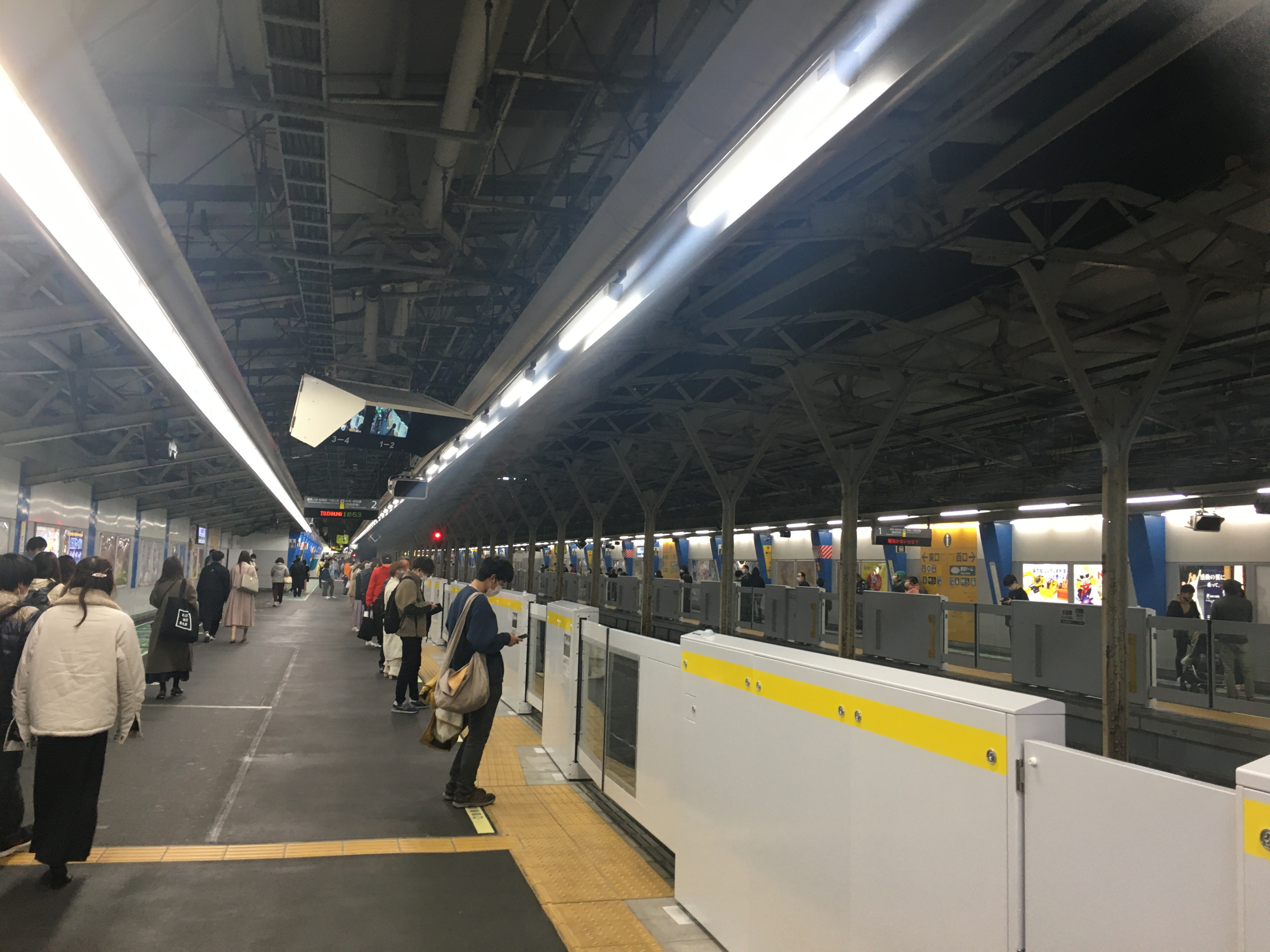
- The JR Chūō-Sōbu Line platforms in April 2022

General information
- Location: 2 Kanda-Misakichō, Chiyoda City, Tokyo; Japan
- Operator: JR East
- Line: Chūō-Sōbu Line
- Platforms: 1 island platform
- Tracks: 2

Construction
- Structure type: Elevated

Other information
- Station code: JB17

History
- Opened: 24 October 1906; 119 years ago

Passengers
- FY2013: 85,320 daily

Services
Preceding station	JR East	Following station
Iidabashi JB16 towards Mitaka	Chūō–Sōbu Line	Ochanomizu JB18 towards Chiba
Location

The JR East part of the station is located on an elevated viaduct and has two side platforms serving two Chūō-Sōbu Line tracks, with platform 1 being used by westbound trains and platform 2 being used by eastbound trains. South of the platforms there are an extra two tracks for Chūō Line (Rapid) trains, which bypass the station non-stop. There are two exits from the station; the east exit is the busier of the two and features amenities such as a staffed "Midori no Madoguchi" ticket office, ticket vending machines, lockers, and toilets. The west exit has all of these amenities except the ticket office.

=== Platforms ===
1	Chūō-Sōbu Line	for Shinjuku, Nakano, and Mitaka
2	Chūō-Sōbu Line	for Ochanomizu, Kinshichō, Tsudanuma, and Chiba

== Toei ==
Suidobashi Station 水道橋駅

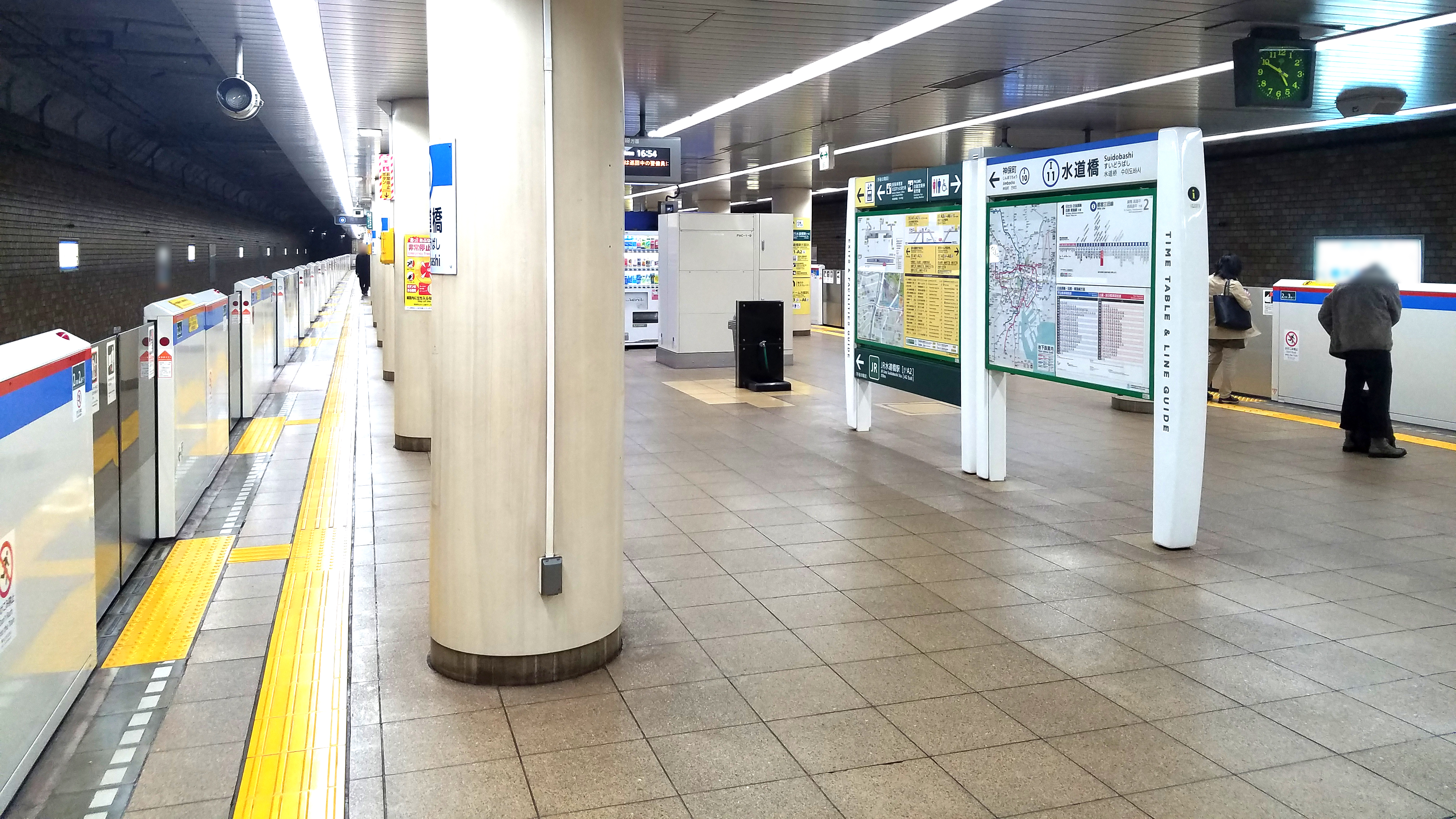
- Toei Subway platforms, December 2019

General information
- Location: 1-3-42 Koraku, Bunkyō City, Tokyo （文京区後楽1-3-42） Japan
- Operator: Toei Subway
- Line: Mita Line
- Platforms: 1 island platform
- Tracks: 2

Construction
- Structure type: Underground

Other information
- Station code: I-11

History
- Opened: 30 June 1972; 54 years ago

Passengers
- FY2013: 21,903 daily

Services
Preceding station	Toei Subway	Following station
Kasuga towards Nishi-takashimadaira	Mita Line	Jimbocho towards Meguro
Location

The Toei Subway station has one island platform serving two tracks.

=== Platforms ===
1
2
Mita Line
Mita Line
- for Shirokane-takanawa and Meguro
- Meguro Line for Musashi-Kosugi and Hiyoshi
- Sotetsu Main Line for Ebina via the Tokyu/Sotetsu Shin-Yokohama Line
- Sotetsu Izumino Line for Shōnandai via the Tokyu/Sotetsu Shin-Yokohama Line
for Sugamo and Nishi-takashimadaira

== History ==
What is now the JR East station first opened on 24 October 1906. The Toei Subway station opened on 30 June 1972.

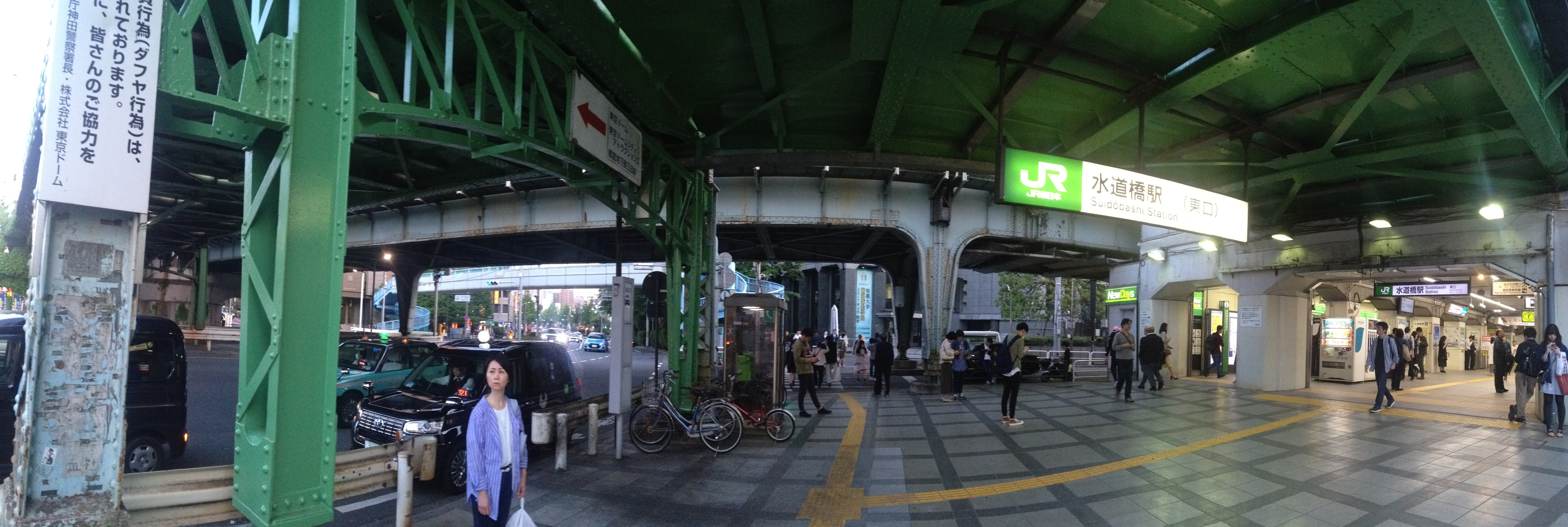
JR East exit, 2018.

== Passenger statistics ==
In fiscal 2013, the JR East station was used by an average of 85,320 passengers daily (boarding passengers only), making it the 49th-busiest station operated by JR East. In fiscal 2013, the Toei station was used by an average of 21,903 passengers daily (boarding passengers only). The daily average passenger figures (boarding passengers only) for JR East in previous years are as shown below.

Fiscal year	Daily average
2000	89,320
2005	87,040
2010	83,952
2011	82,133
2012	83,706
2013	85,320

The Number of Passengers on Suidobashi as recorded by the East Japan Railway Company Trains in 2017-2022 was 17,278.

== Surrounding area ==
- Nihon University
- Surugadai University Ochanomizu Campus
- Senshu University Kanda Campus
- Chuo University Korakuen Campus
- Toyo Gakuen University Hongo Campus
- Tokyo University of Career Development Chiyoda Campus
- Tokyo Dental College Suidobashi Clinic
- Tokyo Dome City
- Kanda River - "Suidōbashi" originates from the fact "aqueduct" was built over this river.
- Houbunsha

== See also ==
- List of railway stations in Japan
