= Chuo University =

Private flagship research university in Tokyo, Japan

Coordinates: 35°42′29″N 139°44′56″E

- 中央大学
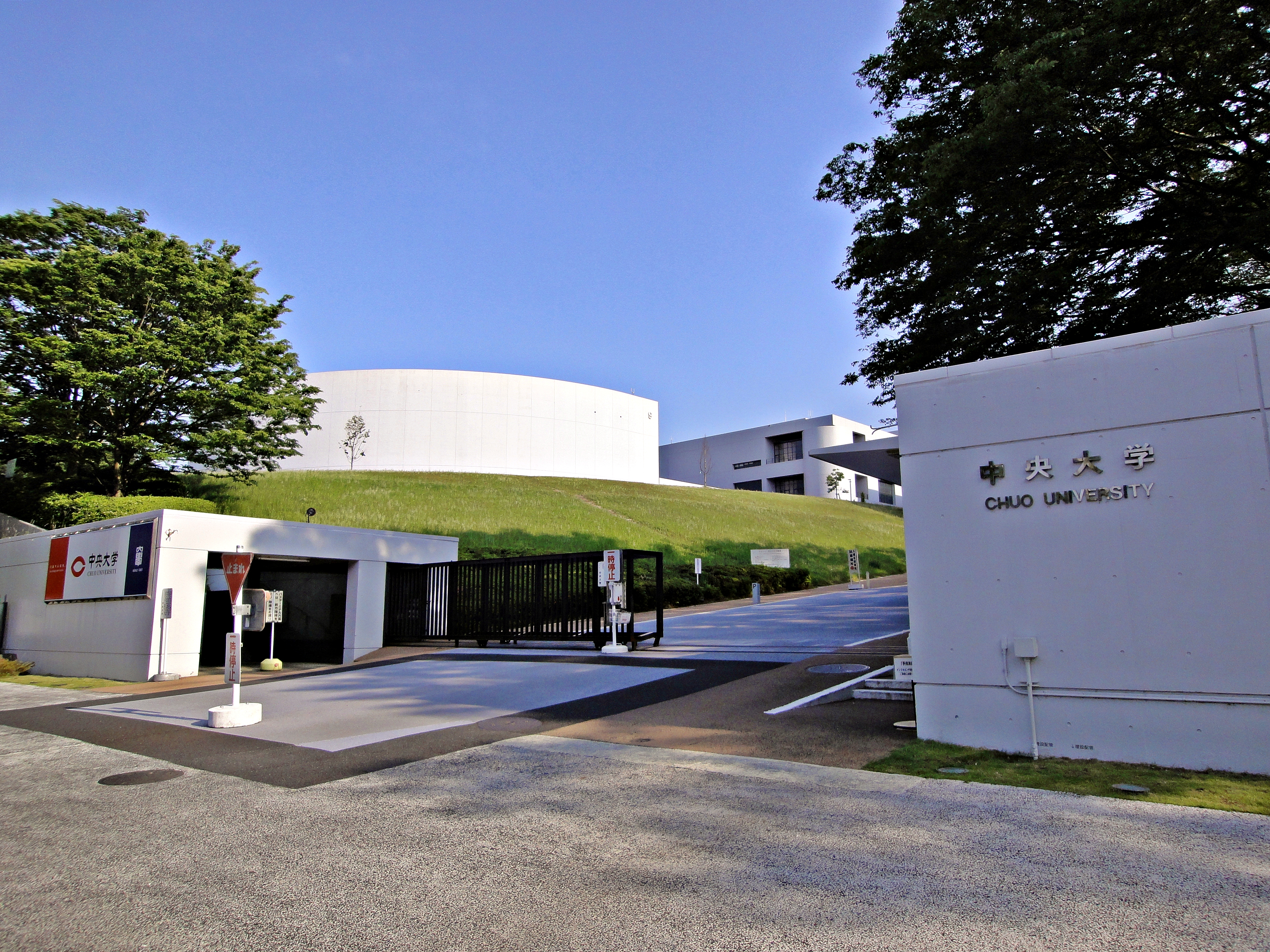
- Tama Campus
- Former name: English law school
- Type: Private
- Established: 1885
- Chancellor: Professor Tadahiko Fukuhara
- President: Shozaburō Sakai
- Faculty: 734(A.D. 2020)
- Students: 26,589
- Undergraduates: 24,957(A.D. 2020)
- Postgraduates: 1,768
- Location: Hachiōji, Tokyo, Japan
- Campus: Myogadani Campus(Fac. of Law), Surugadai Campus(Law school), Tama Campus, Kōrakuen Campus(Fac. of Science and Industry), Ichigaya-Tamachi Campus(Fac. of Int'l Information)
- Mascot: Chuo Prince "Chuouji"
- Website: chuo-u.ac.jp

University rankings
Global
THE	General	1501+

Chuo University (中央大学, Chūō Daigaku), commonly referred to as Chuo (中央) or Chu-Dai (中大), is a private research university in Hachioji, Tokyo, Japan. The university finds its roots in a school called Igirisu Hōritsu Gakkō (English Law School), which was founded in 1885, and became a university in 1920. The university operates four campuses in Tokyo: the largest in Hachiōji (Tama campus), one in Bunkyō (Korakuen campus), and two others in Shinjuku (Ichigaya and Ichigaya-Tamachi campuses). Chuo is organized into six faculties, ten graduate schools, and nine research institutes. There are also four affiliated high schools and two affiliated junior high schools.

When written in Chinese characters, Chuo University shares the same name with National Central University in Taiwan and Chung-Ang University in South Korea.

== History ==
=== Early days: 1885–1920 ===
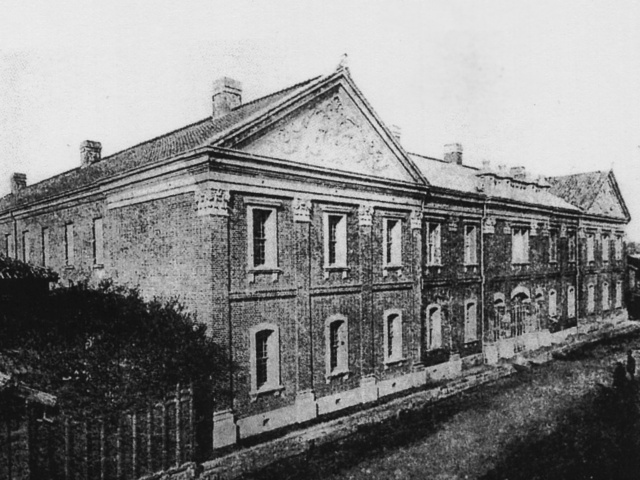
English Law School（1889）

Chuo was founded as the English Law School (英吉利法律学校, Igirisu Hōritsu Gakkō) in 1885 at Kanda in Tokyo by Rokuichiro Masujima together with some group of 18 young lawyers led by him. Before 1889, the school moved and was renamed to Tokyo College of Law (Tōkyō Hōgakuin). The curriculum was changed to reflect the government reform of Japanese law and creation of a new civil code. Opposition to the implementation of new civil code resulted in the government shuttering of the campus journal and the subsequent creation of the Chuo Law Review (Hōgaku Shinpō), which has been regularly published since then.

The university was burnt down in the Great Kanda Fire that occurred in 1892, but was able to hold temporary classes. Before 1903, the school was promoted to Tokyo University of Law (Tokyo Hōgakuin Daigaku) and in 1905, the school expanded itself with the department of economics and renamed itself Chuo University.

The origin of its name "Chuo" has not been certain. However, many founders of the university were once students of the Middle Temple, London, United Kingdom before they completed their training and became qualified as Barristers. This is one of the reasons why the university was renamed to "Chuo", which literally means middle, center or central.

Another fire damaged the campus in June 1917, but it was rebuilt in August 1918.

=== Under the old University Ordinance: 1920–1949 ===
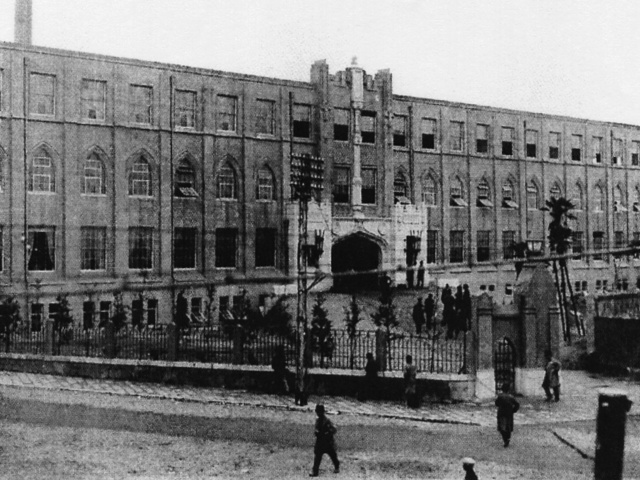
Chuo University（1926）

In 1918, Japanese government enacted University Ordinance (Daigaku Rei) that set legal framework of universities except imperial universities established by Imperial University Ordinance. Under this University Ordinance, licensed universities were permitted to issue official degrees. Chuo University was successfully licensed in 1920 with three faculties (law, economics and commerce), graduate schools and preparatory schools.

The 1923 Great Kantō earthquake again reduced the campus to rubble and it was rebuilt and relocated at Kanda-Surugadai in 1926.

In 1944, Engineering College was established.

=== Reform along with new School Education Act: 1949–1978 ===
After World War II, Chuo University started a series of reformations along with a new School Education Act of 1947. In 1948, its Correspondence Division was annexed to its Faculty of Law. In 1949, a new university system under the School Education Act of 1947 was applied to Chuo University. Its Engineering College was abolished and new Faculty of Engineering was opened in this year. Its Faculty of Literature was established in 1951.Its Faculty of Engineering took wings and was renamed to Faculty of Science and Engineering in 1962.

=== Contemporary ===
In 1978, Chuo University's headquarters, four faculties and graduate schools including laws, economics, commerce and arts moved to newly established Tama Campus in Hachiōji from the Kanda-Surugadai Campus. The Faculty of Science and Engineering and its Graduate School are still located at the Korakuen Campus. For celebrating its 100th anniversary, in 1988, Chuo University built the Surugadai Memorial Hall which is a seven-story building. It is located at a section on the old Kanda-Surugadai Campus.

In 1993, the Faculty of Policy Studies was opened on the Tama Campus.

The Ichigaya Campus was built in 2000 originally as a satellite downtown campus for graduate schools, but, in 2002, a new professional graduate school, Chuo Graduate School of International Accounting and in 2004, another professional graduate school, Chuo Law School were established at the same campus, and then, the satellite downtown campus function for graduate schools partially moved to Ichigaya-Tamachi Campus after it was established in 2010.

In 2008, Chuo Graduate School of Strategic Management, which is a professional graduate school, was launched at Korakuen Campus. Faculty of Literature was renamed to Faculty of Letters.

The Ichigaya-Tamachi Campus in Shinjuku was opened in 2010. The Graduate Schools of International Accounting and Public Policy have moved to this campus.

In 2010, Chuo University celebrated its 125th anniversary and the other university events including the main ceremony were held on November 13.

== Faculties and graduate schools ==
=== Faculties ===
- Faculty of Law
- Faculty of Economics
- Faculty of Commerce
- Faculty of Science and Engineering
- Faculty of Letters
- Faculty of Policy Studies
- Faculty of Global Management (GLOMAC)
- Faculty of Global Informatics (iTL)
- Faculty of Law Correspondence Course

=== Graduate schools ===
- Graduate School of Law
- Graduate School of Economics
- Graduate School of Commerce
- Graduate School of Science and Engineering
- Graduate School of Letters
- Graduate School of Policy Studies
- Graduate School of Global Informatics

=== Professional graduate schools ===
- Chuo Law School
- Chuo Graduate School of Strategic Management

== Campuses ==
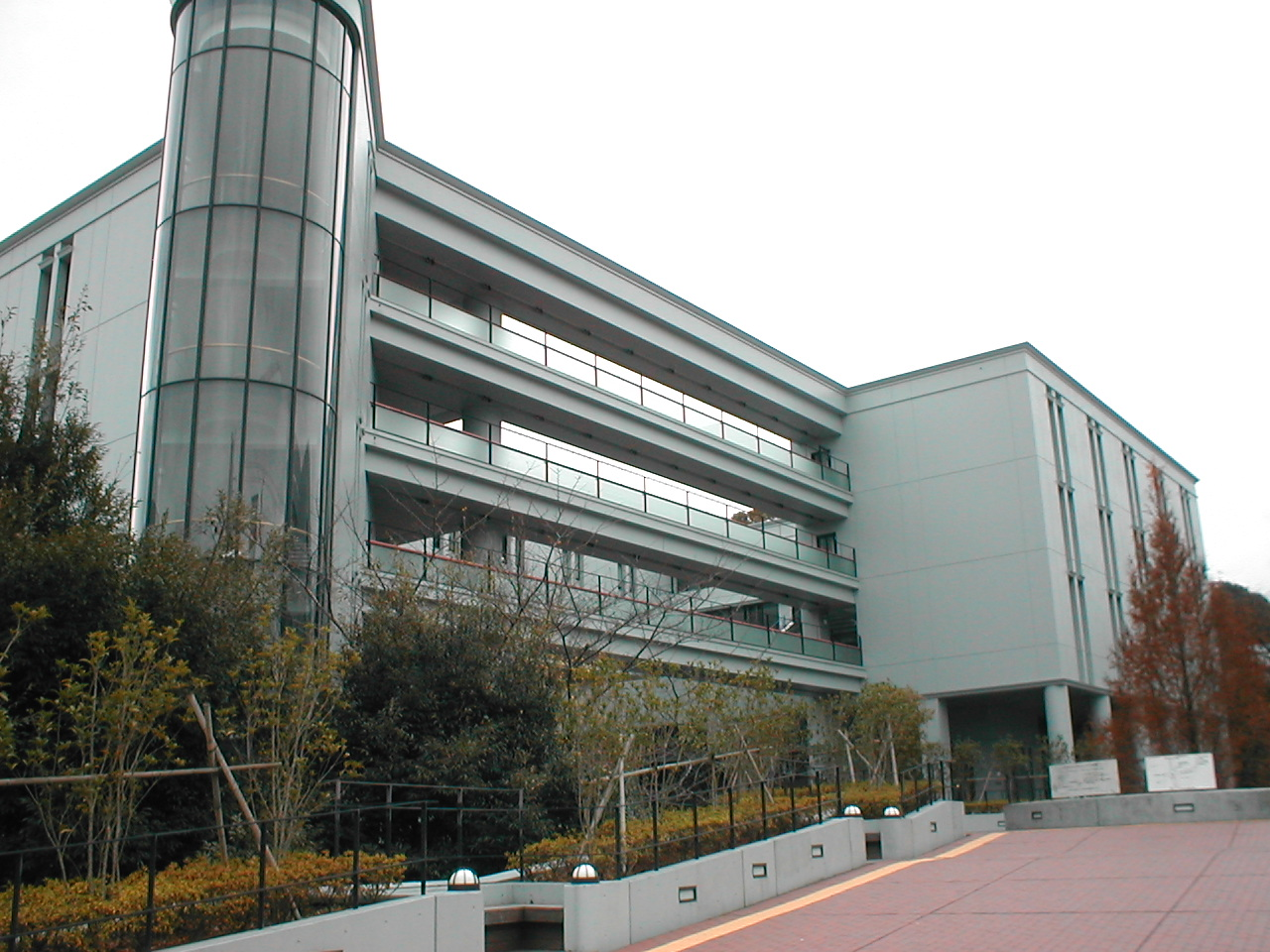
Tama Campus

=== Myogadani campus ===
Campus for Faculty of Law and Graduate School of Research of Law affairs. This campus opened in April 2023, the two newest campuses (Myogadani campus, Surugadai campus) and flagship campus of Chuo University.

Traffic：Tokyo Metro Marunouchi line, Myogadani Station(M-23). From station exit No.1 to Myogadani campus is 1min. (via Kasuga-dori Avenue)

=== Tama campus ===
This, the main campus, is a short walk from the Chūō-Daigaku-Meisei-Daigaku Station of the Tama Monorail, easily reachable from the JR Chūō, Keiō or Odakyū line.

It houses headquarters, all the undergraduate faculties except for the Faculty of Science and Engineering, five graduate schools including law, economics, commerce, arts and policy studies.

=== Korakuen campus ===
It can be reached from Kasuga Station (Ōedo and Mita subway lines), Kōrakuen Station (Marunouchi and Namboku subway lines), and Suidōbashi Station (JR Chūō-Sōbu Line).

It houses the Faculty of Science and Engineering and the corresponding graduate school, and the Graduate School of Strategic Management (professional graduate school).

=== Ichigaya campus ===
This is in Shinjuku ward, Tokyo. It can be reached from Akebonobashi Station (Shinjuku subway line), Yotsuya-sanchōme Station (Marunouchi subway line), and Ichigaya Station (JR Chūō-Sōbu Line, and Shinjuku, Namboku, and Yūrakuchō subway lines).

It contains the Chuo Law School (professional graduate school).

=== Ichigaya-Tamachi campus ===
This too is in Shinjuku ward, Tokyo. It is near Ichigaya Station (JR Chūō-Sōbu Line, Shinjuku, Namboku, and Yūrakuchō subway lines).

It contains the Chuo Graduate School of International Accounting (professional graduate school) and the Graduate School of Public Policy. It is also a downtown satellite campus for graduate schools.

=== Surugadai Memorial Hall ===
This is in Chiyoda ward, Tokyo. It can be reached from Ochanomizu Station (JR Chūō-Sōbu Line and Marunouchi subway line).

== Academic activities ==
=== Research institutions ===
Chuo has eight research institutions and one research based educational institution.

==== Institute of Comparative Law in Japan ====
It was established as the first research institute for comparative legal studies in Japan and East Asia. Its academic research journal Hikakuhō Zasshi is one of the most prestigious academic journals in this field. Its office and library are on Tama Campus.

==== Institute of Economic Research ====
It was established in 1964. Its research covers microeconomics, macroeconomics and Marxian economics.

==== Institute of Social Sciences ====
It was established in 1979. Its research covers a wide range of social sciences including politics, applied policy studies, area studies and modern histories.

==== Institute of Business Research ====
The Japanese name of this institute is "Kigyō Kenkyūjo", literally Institute for Business Entity Analysis. It was established in 1979. It is known for its large collection of material on Japanese corporations or business entities.

==== Institute of Cultural Science ====
The Japanese name of this institute is "Jinbun-kagaku Kenkyūjo", literally Institute of Humanities. The research undertaken by the institute is primarily collaborative, and involves study of cultural sciences in their broadest sense.

==== Institute of Health and Sports Science ====
It was established in 1978. Its main office and laboratories are in the main Gymnastic Building on Tama Campus.

==== Institute of Science and Engineering ====
The institute, established in 1992, promotes joint and project research in science and technology. Its office is on Korakuen Campus.

==== Institute of Policy and Cultural Studies ====
The institute was established in 1996 for promoting applied research in policy studies.

==== Institute of Accounting Research ====
This institute was founded in 1948, for researching practice and theory of corporate accounting, tax, and legislation and/or regulation on business entities. In 1979, Chuo decided to separate it into two. A new Institute of Business Research succeeded research functions and the Institute of Accounting Research changed its function into research-based education in accounting. The institute offers various courses for students who would like to be qualified as CPA or tax accountant, or to become business professionals empowered by the knowledge of accounting.

=== 21st Century Center of Excellence ===
"21st Century Center of Excellence" (COE) program is the Japanese government's special support program for establishing top research centers within research universities. Chuo had this support from 2002 to 2006 for its "Research on Security and Reliability in Electronic Society". Combining cryptographic technologies and other social engineering methods including legal studies, Chuo contributed to society on this matter.

=== International Residence and Library ===
In 2011, as a part of the university's promotional efforts for internalization, Chuo opened an international residence in Hino, Tokyo to provide new and already-enrolled students with 64 private rooms and communal living spaces where students can communicate with fellow students and develop international perspectives. In 2012, an additional international exchange residence with 94 all-in-one private rooms was opened to further the internationalization efforts. Chuo also boast a rich history spanning over 125 years. The university is equipped with an immense library with about 2.1 million volumes in its collection.

== Notable alumni ==
=== Athletes ===
- Shozo Sasahara (wrestling, Olympic gold medallist)
- Takao Sakurai (boxing, Olympic gold medallist)
- Isao Okano (judo, Olympic gold medallist)
- Terry Farnsworth (born 1942) (judo, Canadian Olympian)
- Kōkichi Tsuburaya (athletics, Olympic bronze medallist)
- Kohei Murakoso (athletics, Games of the XI Olympiad)
- Hiromori Kawashima (former commissioner of Nippon Professional Baseball)
- Yutaka Takagi (baseball)
- Shinnosuke Abe (baseball)
- Yoshiyuki Kamei (baseball)
- Yoshio Anabuki (baseball, former Manager of Nankai Hawks)
- Hirokazu Sawamura (baseball, pitcher of Yomiuri Giants and Chiba Lotte Marines)
- Tsuyoshi Fukui (tennis / Managing Director, Japan Tennis Association)
- Dejima Takeharu (sumo, former ōzeki)
- Takekaze Akira (sumo, former sekiwake)
- Tamakasuga Ryōji (sumo)
- Mai Nakamura (swimmer, Olympic silver medallist)
- Masami Tanaka (swimmer, Olympic bronze medallist)
- Sumika Minamoto (swimmer, Olympic bronze medallist)
- Masahiro Fukuda (football player)
- Nobutoshi Kaneda (football player)
- Kengo Nakamura (football player)
- Ken Naganuma (football player, former President of the Japan Football Association)
- Kyogo Furuhashi (football player)
- Katsuaki Satō (karate)
- Jumbo Tsuruta (wrestling)
- Kazushi Sakuraba (wrestling)
- Yuki Ishikawa (volleyball player)
- Tatsuya Fukuzawa (volleyball player)
- Masahiro Sekita (volleyball player)
- Issei Otake (volleyball player)
- Mariko Yamamoto (cricketer, Olympic bronze medallist)

=== Lawyers ===
- Chiharu Saiguchi (former Justice, the Supreme Court)
- Tatsuo Kainaka (former Justice, the Supreme Court / Superintending Prosecutor, Tokyo High Public Prosecutors Office)

=== Politicians ===
- Toshiki Kaifu (Prime Minister / former chairman, Liberal Democratic Party)
- Masahiko Kōmura (Minister for Foreign Affairs)
- Okiharu Yasuoka (Minister of Justice)
- Toshihiro Nikai (Minister of Economy, Trade and Industry)
- Hirofumi Hirano (Chief Cabinet Secretary, the House of Representatives)
- Yonezo Maeda (former Seiyukai leader / former Minister of Railways / lawyer)
- Yoshimi Watanabe (former Minister, State for Financial Policy and Administrative Reform)
- Ichita Yamamoto (House of Councilors member)
- Hideo Usui (former Minister of Justice)
- Masaaki Kanda (Governor, Aichi Prefecture)
- Fumio Ueda (Mayor, Sapporo city / lawyer)
- Yorikane Masumoto (former Mayor, Kyoto city)
- Hwang Jang-yop (North Korean defector; dropped out of the law school in 1944. Was previously Kim Il-Sung's and Kim Jong-il's personal advisor.)
- Hiroshi Saitō (mayor of Tokorozawa, Saitama)

=== Journalists, intellectuals ===
- Hasegawa Nyozekan

=== Academics ===
- Hachiro Sugimoto (Medicinal chemist, Ph.D. / Visiting professor, Graduate School of Pharmaceutical Sciences, Kyoto University)
- Tadahiko Fukuhara, (President of Chuo University 2011)
- Kenzo Kitakata
- Yoshie Wada (Naoki Prize)
- Kazumasa Hirai
- Kazuo Koike
- Ken Akamatsu (manga artist)
- Masashi Ueda (manga artist)
- Makoto Yukimura (manga artist)

=== Business ===
- Fujio Mitarai (Chairman & CEO, Canon / Chairman, "Nippon Keidanren" Japan Business Federation)
- Toshifumi Suzuki (Chairman & CEO, Seven & i Holdings / former chairman of the Board of Trustees, Chuo University)
- Osamu Suzuki (Chairman & CEO, Suzuki Motor)
- Hisao Oguchi (Vice President, SEGA)
- Hiroshi Yanai (chairman, President & CEO, Pia)
- Hirotake Yano (President, Founder & CEO, Daiso)

=== Arts and entertainment ===
- Seiko Matsuda
- Tetsurō Tamba (actor)
- Kiyoshi Atsumi (actor)
- Minoru Chiaki (actor)
- Susumu Kurobe (actor, Ultraman)
- Shinji Yamashita (actor)
- Takaya Kamikawa (actor)
- Hiroshi Abe (actor)
- Tani Kei (comedian, Crazy Cats)
- Shinji Sōmai (film director)
- Makoto Shinkai (director)
- Yuka Kato (CBC announcer)
- Kei Orihara (photographer)

=== Others ===
- Jōsei Toda (2nd President of Soka Gakkai)
- Kunio Yonenaga (former shogi Meijin / former president, Japan Shogi Association)
- Hiroyuki Nishimura (2channel)
- Isao Kataoka, Japan Ice Hockey Federation executive
- Satoshi Takano (professional shogi player)
- Hiroaki Yokoyama (professional shogi player)
- Naohiro Ishida (professional shogi player)
