= Yanai (Japanese surname) =

Yanai (written: 柳井, 柳内 or 箭内) is a Japanese surname. Notable people with the surname include:

- Hiroshi Yanai (disambiguation), multiple people
- Masayuki Yanai (箭内 政之; born 1959), Japanese astronomer
- Micky Yanai (ミッキー 柳井; born 1959), Japanese pornographic actor
- Shinsaku Yanai (柳内 伸作; born 1947), Japanese writer
- Tadashi Yanai (柳井 正; born 1949), Japanese billionaire
