= Imperial Japanese Army Academy =

Defunct officer training school in Tokyo, Japan

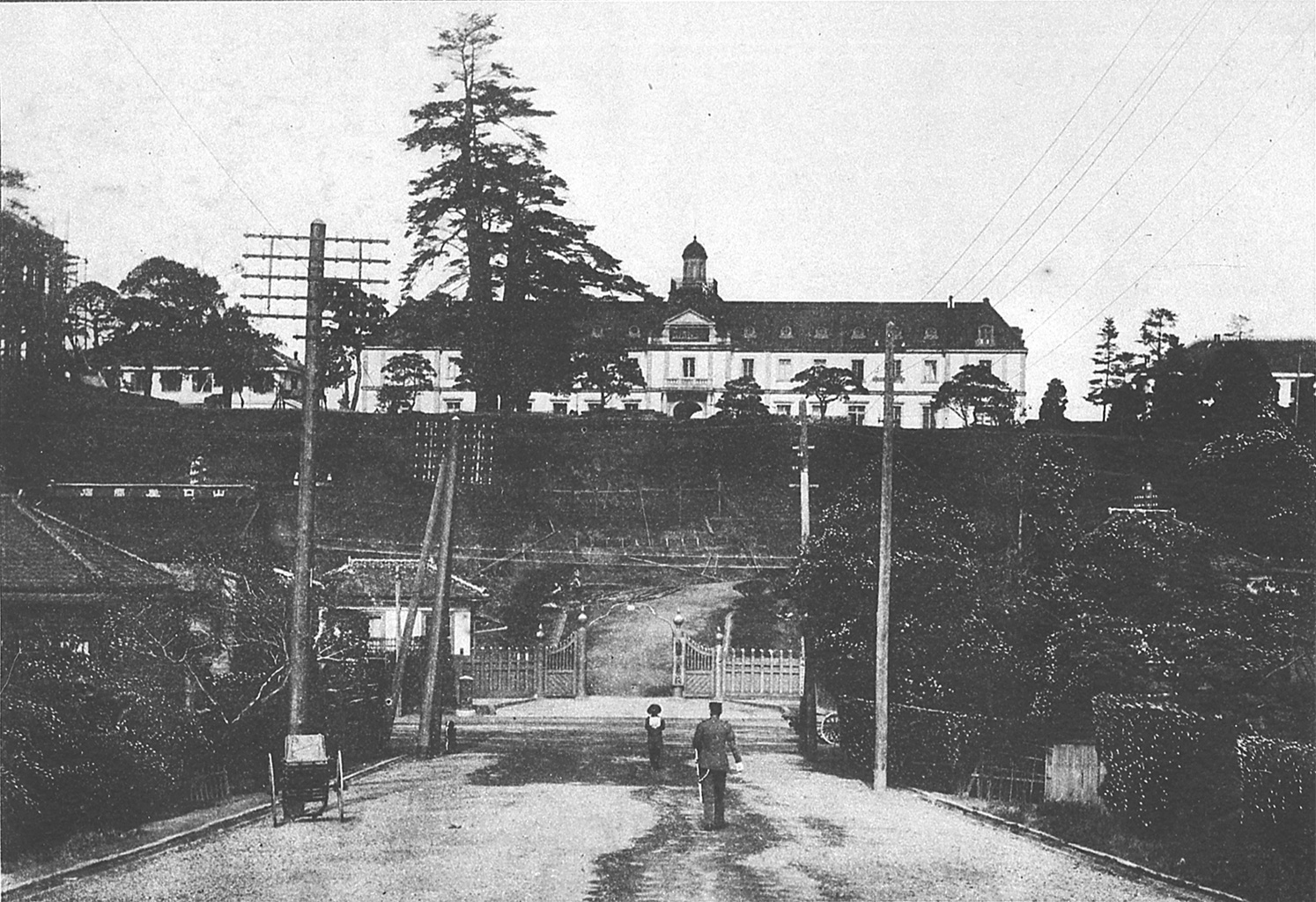
Imperial Japanese Army Academy, Tokyo 1907

The Imperial Japanese Army Academy (陸軍士官学校, Rikugun Shikan Gakkō) was the principal officer's training school for the Imperial Japanese Army. The programme consisted of a junior course for graduates of local army cadet schools and for those who had completed four years of middle school, and a senior course for officer candidates.

== History and background ==
Established as the Heigakkō in 1868 in Kyoto, the officer training school was renamed the Imperial Japanese Army Academy in 1874 and relocated to Ichigaya, Tokyo on the grounds of the Ichigaya Kamiyashiki. After 1898, the Academy came under the supervision of the Army Education Administration.

In 1937 the Academy was divided, with the Senior Course Academy being relocated to Sagamihara in Kanagawa prefecture, and the Junior Course School moved to Asaka, Saitama. The 50th graduation ceremony was held in the new Academy buildings in Sagamihara on 20 December 1937, and was attended by the Shōwa Emperor (Emperor Hirohito) himself. In 1938, a separate school was established for military aviation officers. During World War II, the school was highly respected and faculty consisted of many Tokyo Imperial University alumni. It also accepted a large number of students from China, and many of those cadets later had prominent ranks in the Republic of China Armed Forces. In June 1945, as a precautionary measure due to Allied bombings, the Academy sent its entire staff and 3,000 students on a long-term bivouac in Nagano Prefecture, leaving the installation under a light guard as caretakers. In September 1945, after the surrender of Japan, a battalion of the U.S. Army’s 1st Cavalry Division took control of the Academy from the soldiers guarding it. The Academy was abolished along with the Imperial Japanese Army at the end of 1945, and its Sagamihara grounds are now part of the United States Army base of Camp Zama.

Currently the corresponding institution for the modern Japan Ground Self-Defense Force is the National Defense Academy of Japan.

== Curriculum ==
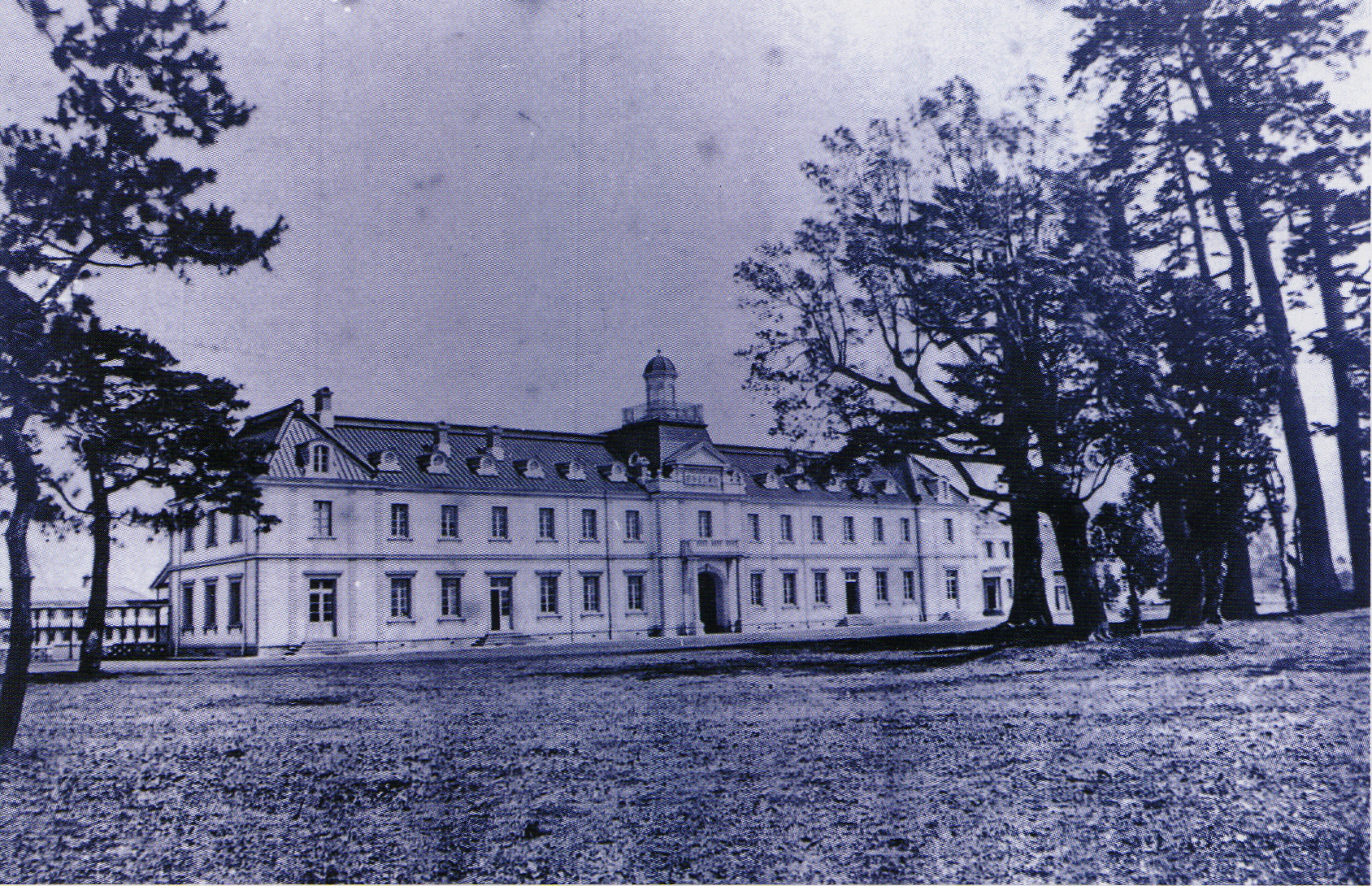
The Imperial Japanese Army Academy in Ichigaya, Tokyo (市ヶ谷陸軍士官学校), built by the second French Military Mission to Japan (1874 photograph).

From 1937 to 1945, an estimated 18,476 cadets were trained at the Imperial Japanese Army Academy.

Candidates for the Imperial Japanese Army Academy were rigidly selected from graduates of 3-year courses at one of the military preparatory schools (Rikugun Yonen Gakkō) at Tokyo, Osaka, Nagoya, Hiroshima, Sendai, and Kumamoto, and from other applicants with the proper physical and educational qualifications. The Rikugun Yonen Gakkō were schools mainly for officers' children and children of army soldiers who fell in action. Some candidates were enlisted men in active service under 25 years old; others were general applicants between ages 16 to 18 who passed an examination.

The training curriculum included college-level general education courses, traditional martial arts and horsemanship. After completing the two year junior portion of training at Asaka in Saitama, cadets were assigned for eight months to infantry regiments to become familiar with Army weaponry and platoon leadership skills before resuming studies in the 1-year, 8-month senior program at Sagamihara in Kanagawa. Upon graduation, cadets became apprentice officers with the grade of sergeant-major (but who were treated as officers), and after the successful completion of four months probation in their assigned regiments, were formally commissioned as second lieutenants.

== See also ==
- Numazu Military Academy
- Army War College (Japan)
- Imperial Japanese Army Air Force Academy
- Imperial Japanese Naval Academy
- List of Graduates in Japanese Imperial Military Academies (1891–1934)
- Tokyo Boys
- National Defense Academy of Japan
