= Ichigaya =

Area in eastern Shinjuku, Tokyo, Japan

Coordinates: 35.68714°N 139.73768°E

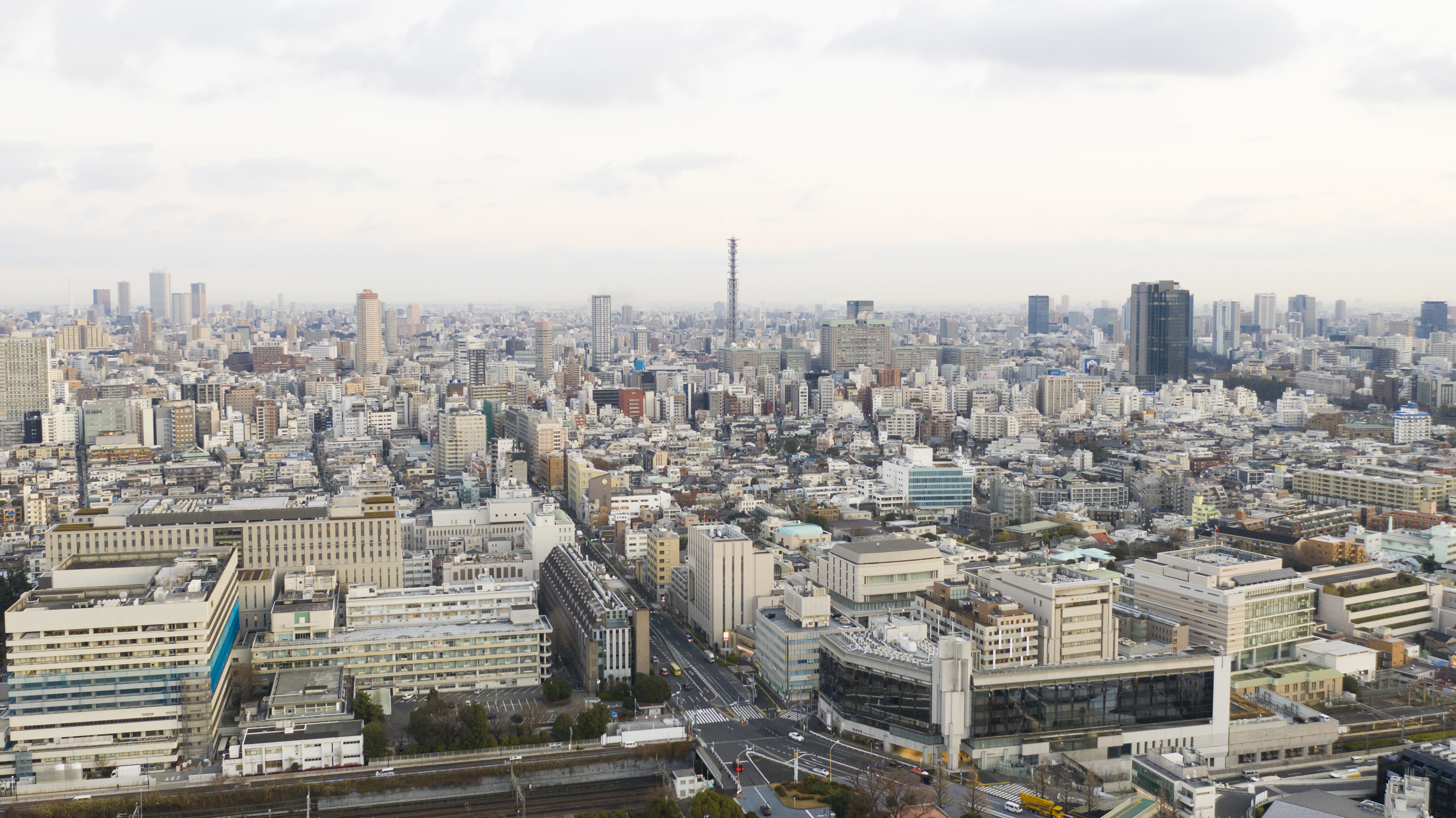
Aerial view of Ichigaya (2020)

Ichigaya (Japanese: 市谷 or 市ヶ谷・市ケ谷) is an area in the eastern portion of Shinjuku, Tokyo, Japan.

== Places in Ichigaya ==
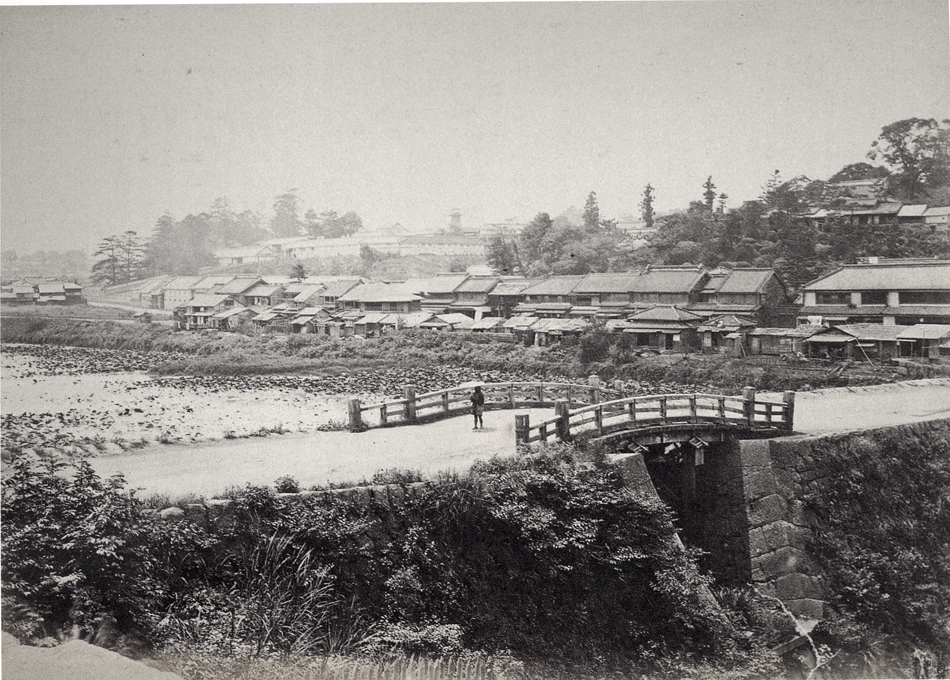
View of the Ichigaya kamiyashiki of the Owari Tokugawa family, as seen across Ichigaya Gate Bridge (1872)

- Hosei University Ichigaya Campus
- Chuo University Graduate School
- Ministry of Defense headquarters: Formerly GHQ of the Imperial Japanese Army; following World War II, the building became the headquarters for the Japan Ground Self-Defense Force Eastern Army. Mishima Yukio committed suicide here in 1970. It became Defense Agency headquarters in May 2000 when the previous headquarters in Akasaka were closed to make way for Tokyo Midtown. In 2007 the organization became a ministry. The Memorial Zone for JSDF personnel is located to the east of the Defense Ministry headquarters.
- Japanese Go Association
- Residence of the ambassador of Morocco to Japan
- Ichigaya Kamiyashiki, former site of the Owari Tokugawa family residence

== Companies based in Ichigaya ==
- Borland Japan
- Dai Nippon Printing
- Informatica Corporation Japan
- Nakano Corporation
- Team Ninja

== Metro stations ==
- Akebonobashi Station (Toei Shinjuku Line)
- Ichigaya Station (JR Chūō Local Line, Namboku Line, Toei Shinjuku Line, Yūrakuchō Line) - The JR and Toei platforms are located across the river in Chiyoda.
- Ushigome-yanagichō Station (Toei Ōedo Line)
