= Japan Association for University Athletics and Sport =

Sports governing body in Japan

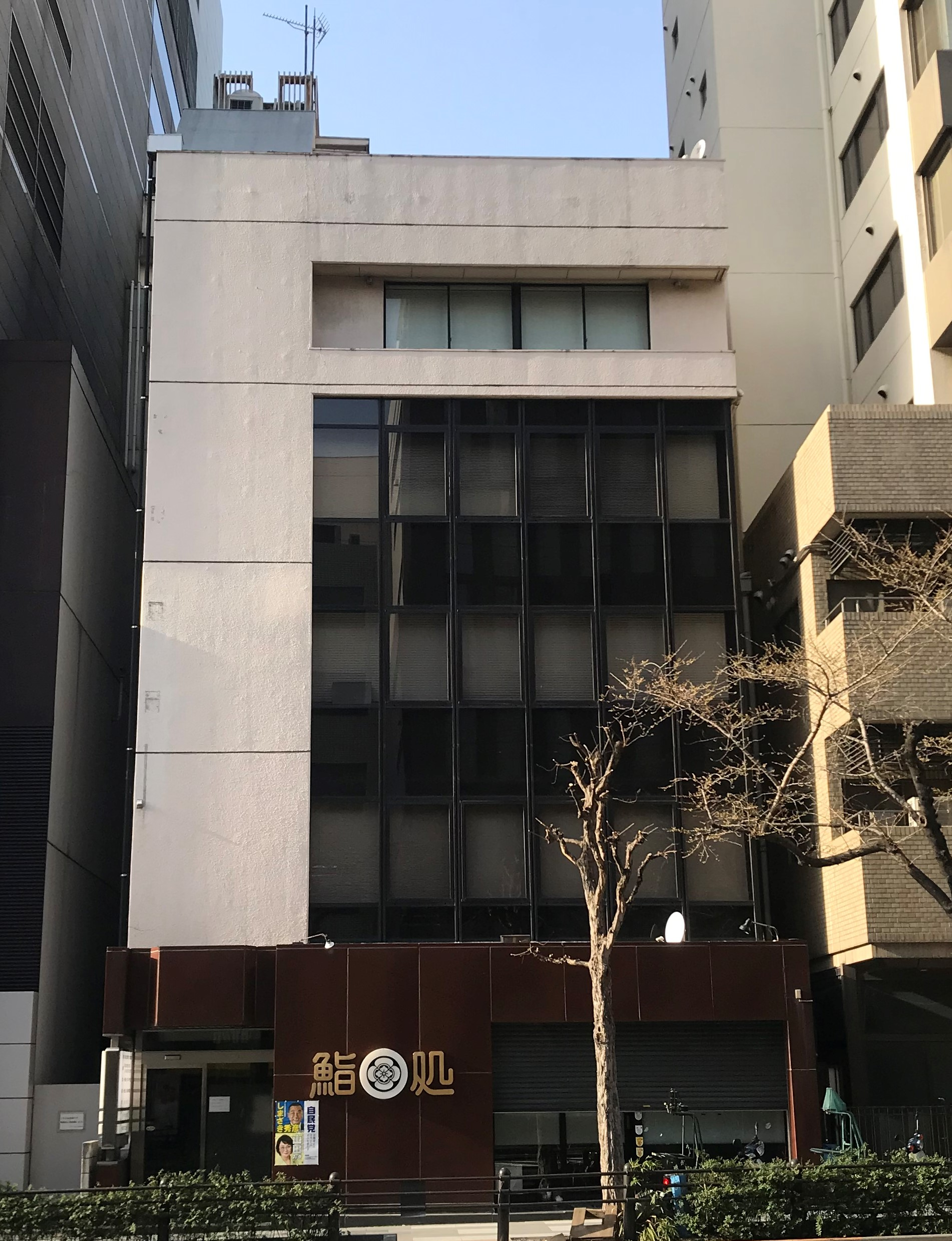
- Abbreviation: UNIVAS
- Formation: March 1, 2019; 7 years ago
- Legal status: Association
- Headquarters: Chiyoda, Tokyo
- Region served: Japan
- Director: Tadahiko Fukuhara
- Website: univas.jp

Japan Association for University Athletics and Sport (UNIVAS) is the national sport governing body for universities in Japan. It was established in March 1, 2019.

== History ==
The creation of the organization stems from the need to create a Japanese version of the National Collegiate Athletic Association from the United States. Until the creation of UNIVAS, sports at universities were administered and organized by the Ministry of Education, Culture, Sports, Science and Technology and Japan Sports Agency. Finally in January 2019, it was announced that an organization would be created with the official launch happening in March 1 of the same year.

== See also ==
- College sports
- International University Sports Federation
- National Collegiate Athletic Association
- Universiade
