= Yanai =

Yanai may refer to:

- Yanai, Yamaguchi, a city in Yamaguchi Prefecture, Japan
  - Yanai Station, a railway station in Yanai, Yamaguchi Prefecture, Japan
- Yanai (surname)
- Yannai, a Jewish surname
- Yannai (Payetan), 7th-century Jewish poet
