= Hiroshi Yanai =

Hiroshi Yanai may refer to:

- Hiroshi Yanai (publisher) (born 1950), Japanese businessperson
- Hiroshi Yanai (handballer) (born 1960), Japanese former handball player
