= Shinjuku-sanchōme Station =

Metro station in Tokyo, Japan

Shinjuku-sanchome Station 新宿三丁目駅

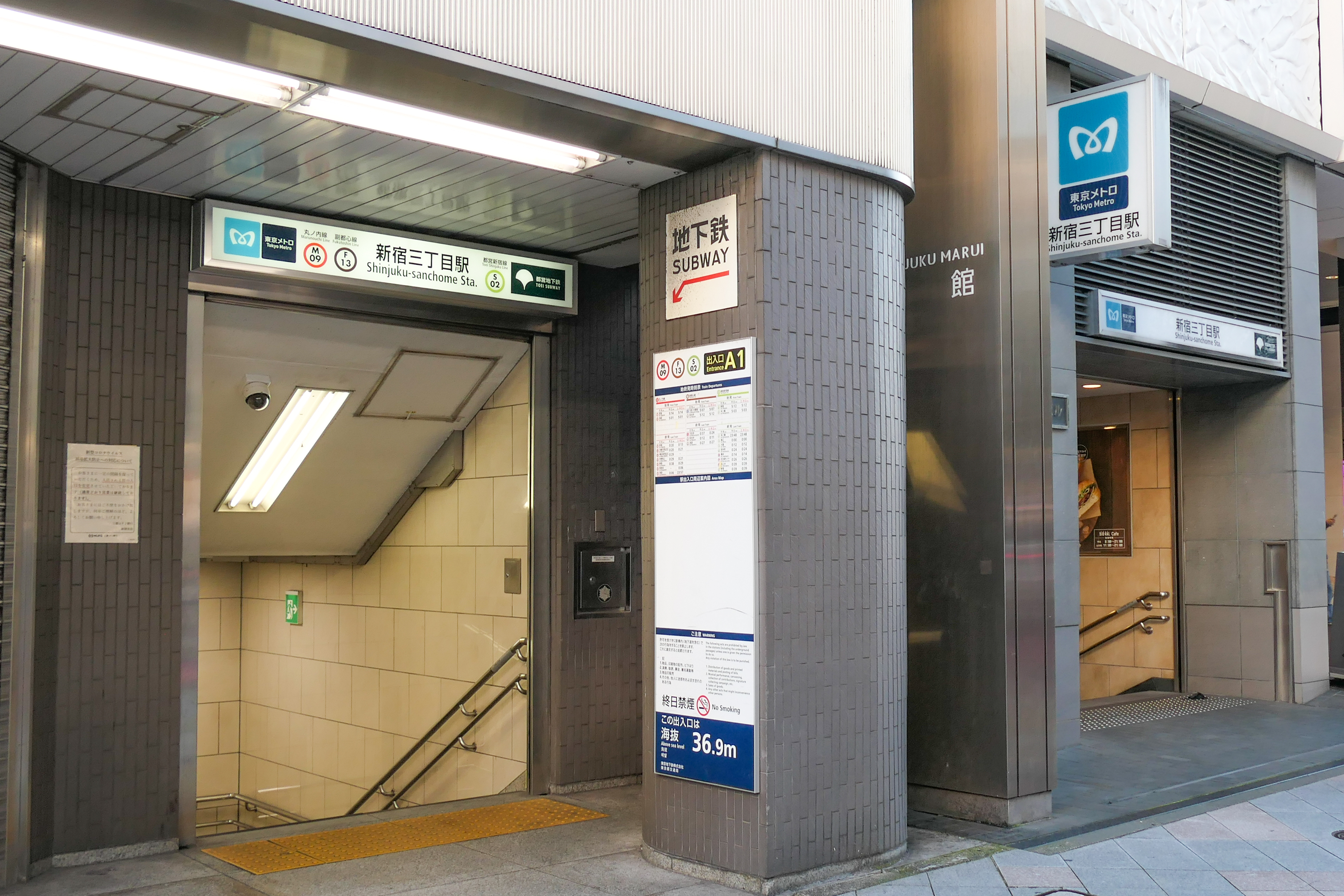
- Entrance A1 in October 2022

General information
- Location: Shinjuku, Tokyo; Japan
- Coordinates: 35°41′26.21″N 139°42′22.56″E
- System: Tokyo subway
- Owner: Tokyo Metro Co., Ltd. Tokyo Metropolitan Government
- Operator: Tokyo Metro; Toei Subway
- Lines: Fukutoshin Line; Marunouchi Line; Shinjuku Line
- Platforms: 3 island platforms
- Tracks: 6
- Connections: Shinjuku Station, bus stop

Construction
- Structure type: Underground

Other information
- Station code: F-13, M-09, S-02

History
- Opened: 15 March 1959; 67 years ago

Services
Preceding station	Tokyo Metro	Following station
Shinjuku towards Ogikubo or Hōnanchō	Marunouchi Line	Shinjuku-gyoemmae towards Ikebukuro
Shibuya towards Motomachi-Chukagai	S-Train Weekends (Weekends and national holidays)	Ikebukuro towards Seibu-Chichibu
Meiji-jingumae towards Motomachi-Chukagai	F Liner	Ikebukuro towards Hannō or Ogawamachi
Meiji-jingumae towards Shibuya	Fukutoshin Line Express Commuter Express	Ikebukuro towards Wakoshi
Kita-sando towards Wakoshi	Fukutoshin Line Local	Higashi-shinjuku towards Wakoshi
Preceding station	Toei Subway	Following station
Shinjuku towards Shibuya	Shinjuku Line	Akebonobashi towards Motoyawata
Location
- Location within Tokyo Yamanote Loop Location within Tokyo wards area Location within Japan

Shinjuku-sanchome Station (新宿三丁目駅, Shinjuku-sanchōme-eki) is a subway station in Shinjuku, Tokyo, Japan, operated jointly by the two Tokyo subway operators, Tokyo Metro and Toei Subway.

== Lines ==
Shinjuku-sanchōme Station is served by the following three subway lines.

- Tokyo Metro Marunouchi Line (station number M-09)
- Tokyo Metro Fukutoshin Line (station number F-13)
- Toei Shinjuku Line (station number S-02)

The Tokyo Metro Fukutoshin Line provides through services to and from the Seibu Ikebukuro Line and Tobu Tojo Line in the north, and the Tokyu Toyoko Line and Minatomirai Line in the south. The Toei Shinjuku Line provides through services to and from the Keio Line in the west. All train services, except Toei Shinjuku Line express trains, stop at this station.

== Station layout ==
The station consists of three separate island platforms serving two tracks for each respective line. The platforms for the Tokyo Metro Marunouchi Line and Fukutoshin Line are interlinked, but transfer to and from the Toei Shinjuku Line requires passing through the Toei and Tokyo Metro station ticket barriers on the main concourse.

=== Tokyo Metro platforms ===
The Tokyo Metro Marunouchi Line platforms are located on the second basement ("B2F") level running approximately east to west, and the Fukutoshin Line platforms are located on the third basement ("B3F") level running approximately north to south. They are linked by stairs and escalators at the north end of the Fukutoshin Line platforms and east end of the Marunouchi Line platforms.

1
Marunouchi Line
for Shinjuku and Ogikubo
2
Marunouchi Line
for Tokyo and Ikebukuro
3
Fukutoshin Line
- for Meiji-jingumae 'Harajuku', and Shibuya
- Tōyoko Line for Yokohama
- Minatomirai Line for Motomachi-Chukagai
- Sōtetsu Izumino Line for Shōnandai via Shin-yokohama Line
4
Fukutoshin Line
for Ikebukuro and Wakoshi
Tobu Tojo Line for Kawagoeshi and Shinrinkōen
Seibu Ikebukuro Line for Hannō

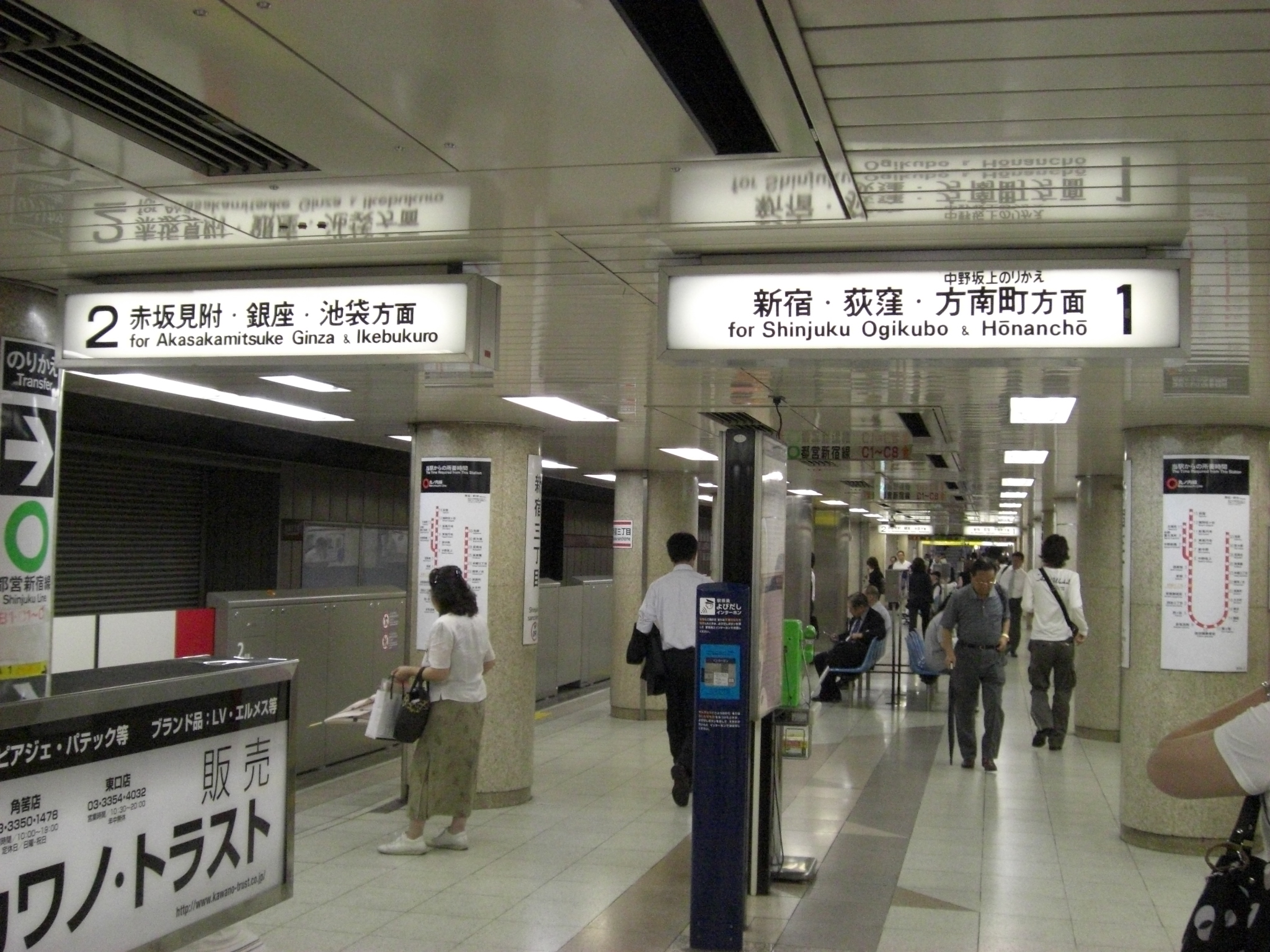
Marunouchi Line platforms in 2007

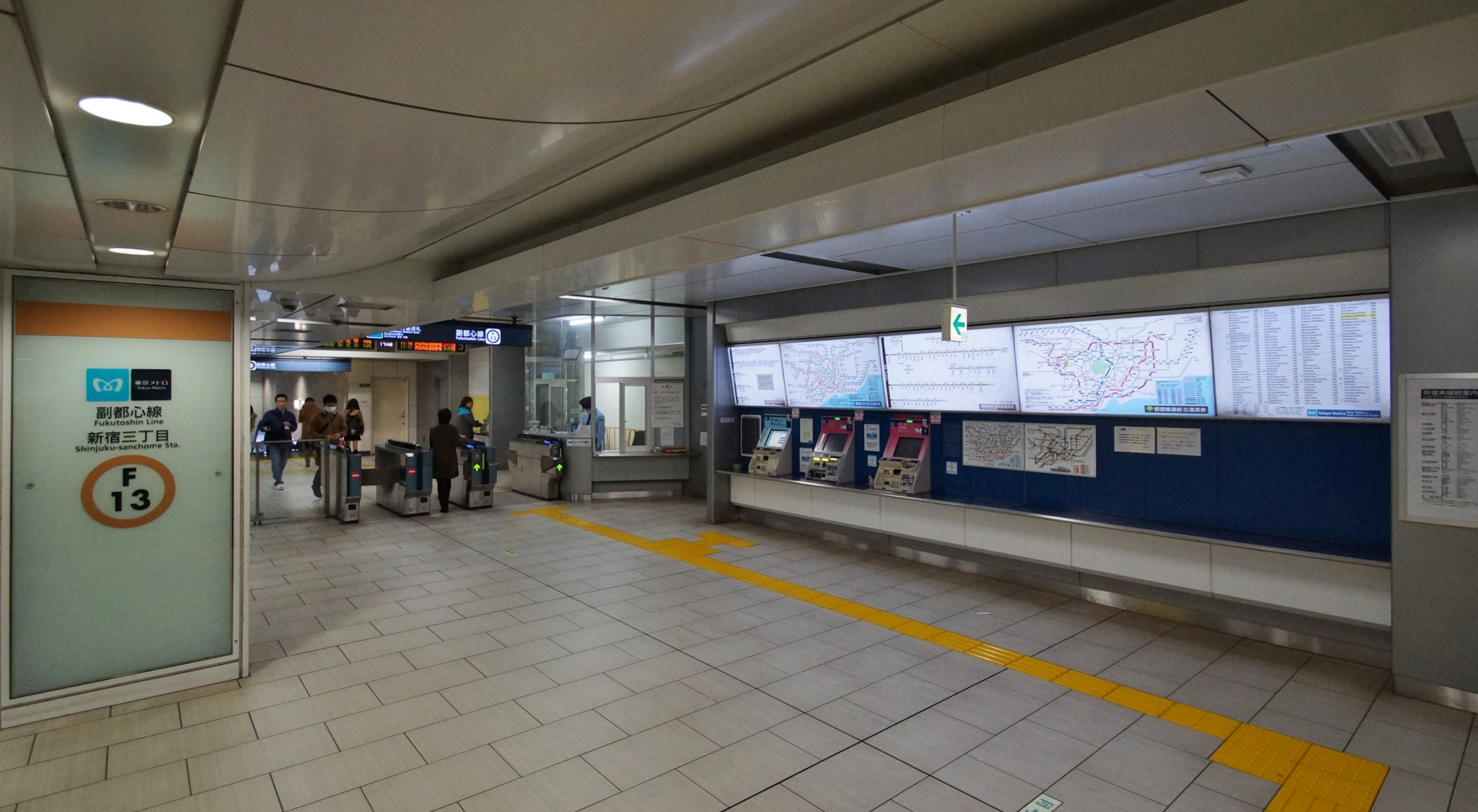
The Fukutoshin Line ticket barriers in November 2013

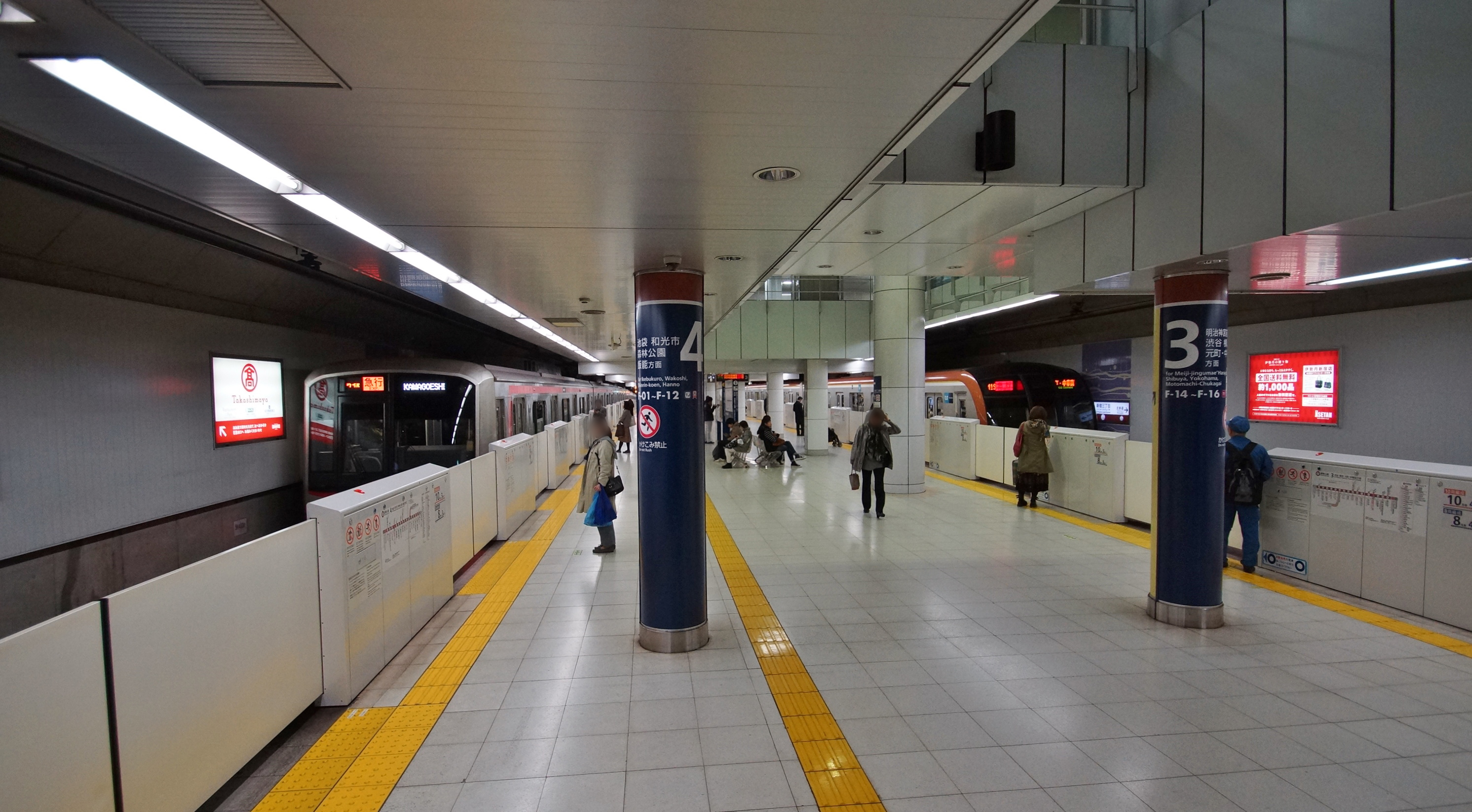
The Fukutoshin Line platforms in November 2013

=== Toei platforms ===
The Toei Shinjuku Line platforms are located on the second basement ("B2F") level to the east of the Marunouchi Line platforms.

1	Shinjuku Line	for Shinjuku; Keiō Line for Hatsudai, Hatagaya, Meidaimae, Chōfu, and Hashimoto
2	Shinjuku Line	for Motoyawata

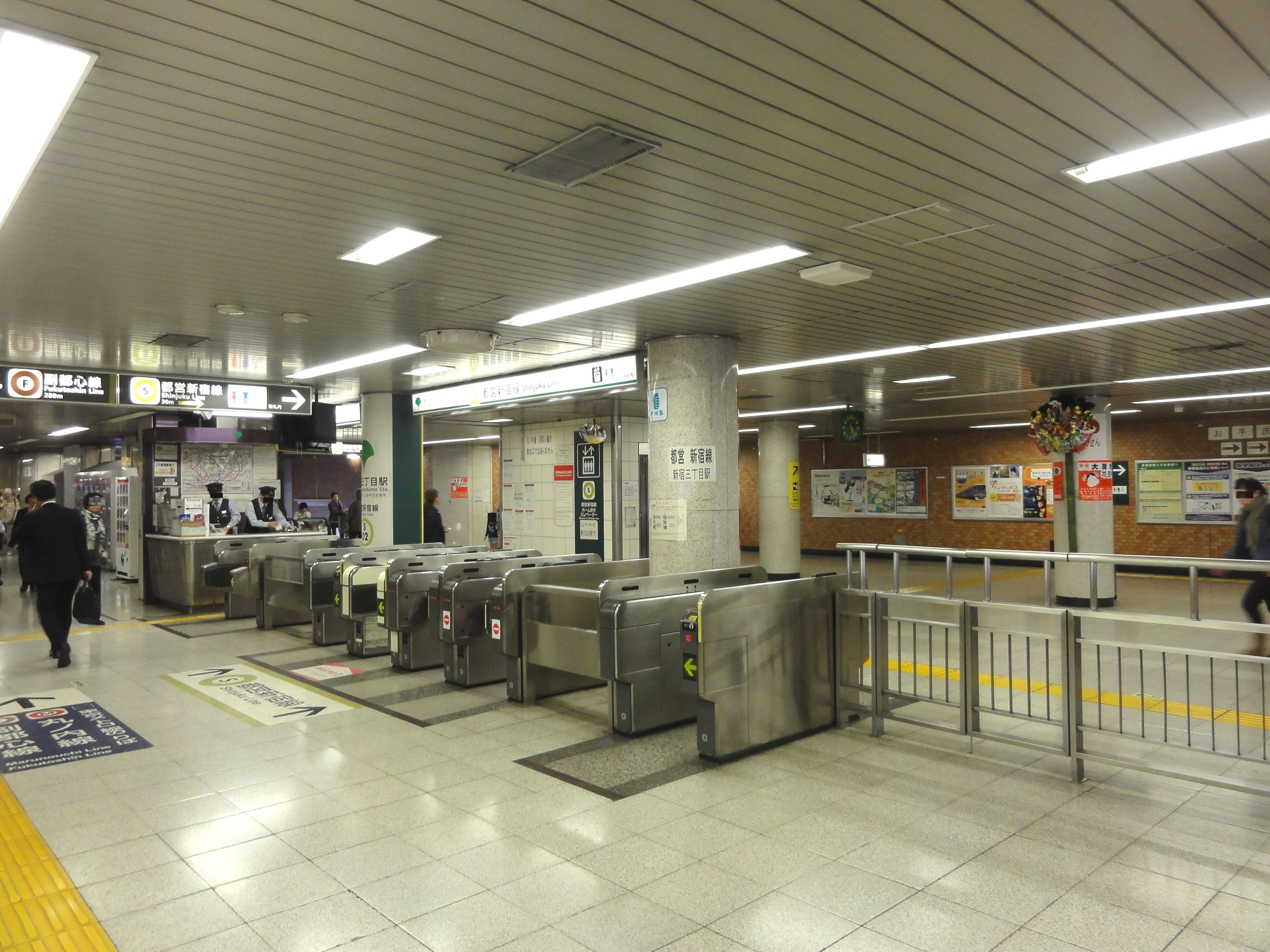
The Toei Shinjuku Line ticket barriers in November 2012

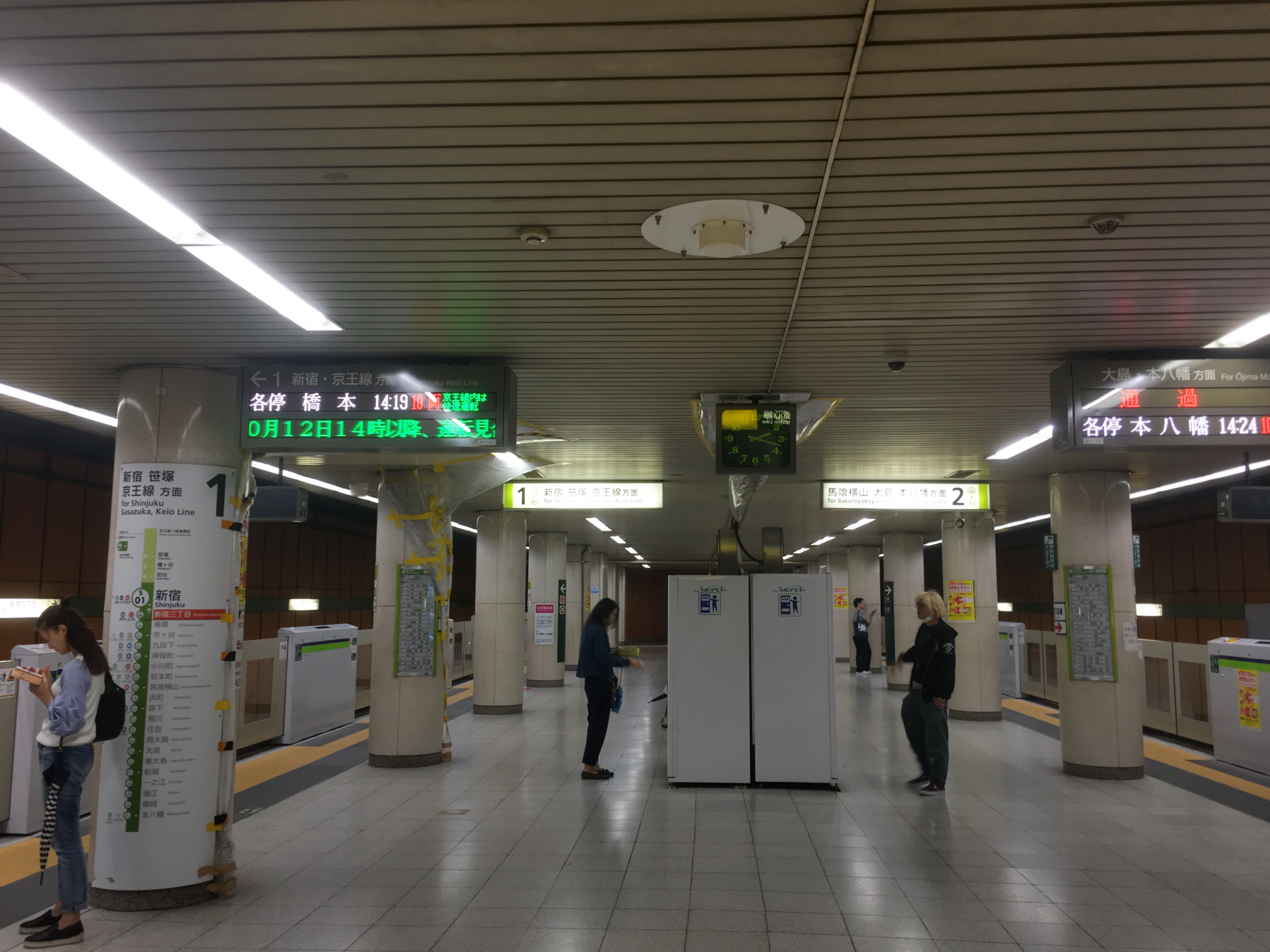
The Toei Shinjuku Line platforms in October 2019

== History ==
Shinjuku-sanchome Station opened on 15 March 1959, as a station on the Marunouchi Line operated by Teito Rapid Transit Authority (TRTA). The Toei Shinjuku Line platforms opened on 16 March 1980. The Tokyo Metro Fukutoshin Line platforms opened on 14 June 2008.

The station facilities of the Marunouchi Line were inherited by Tokyo Metro after the privatization of the Teito Rapid Transit Authority (TRTA) in 2004.

== Surrounding area ==
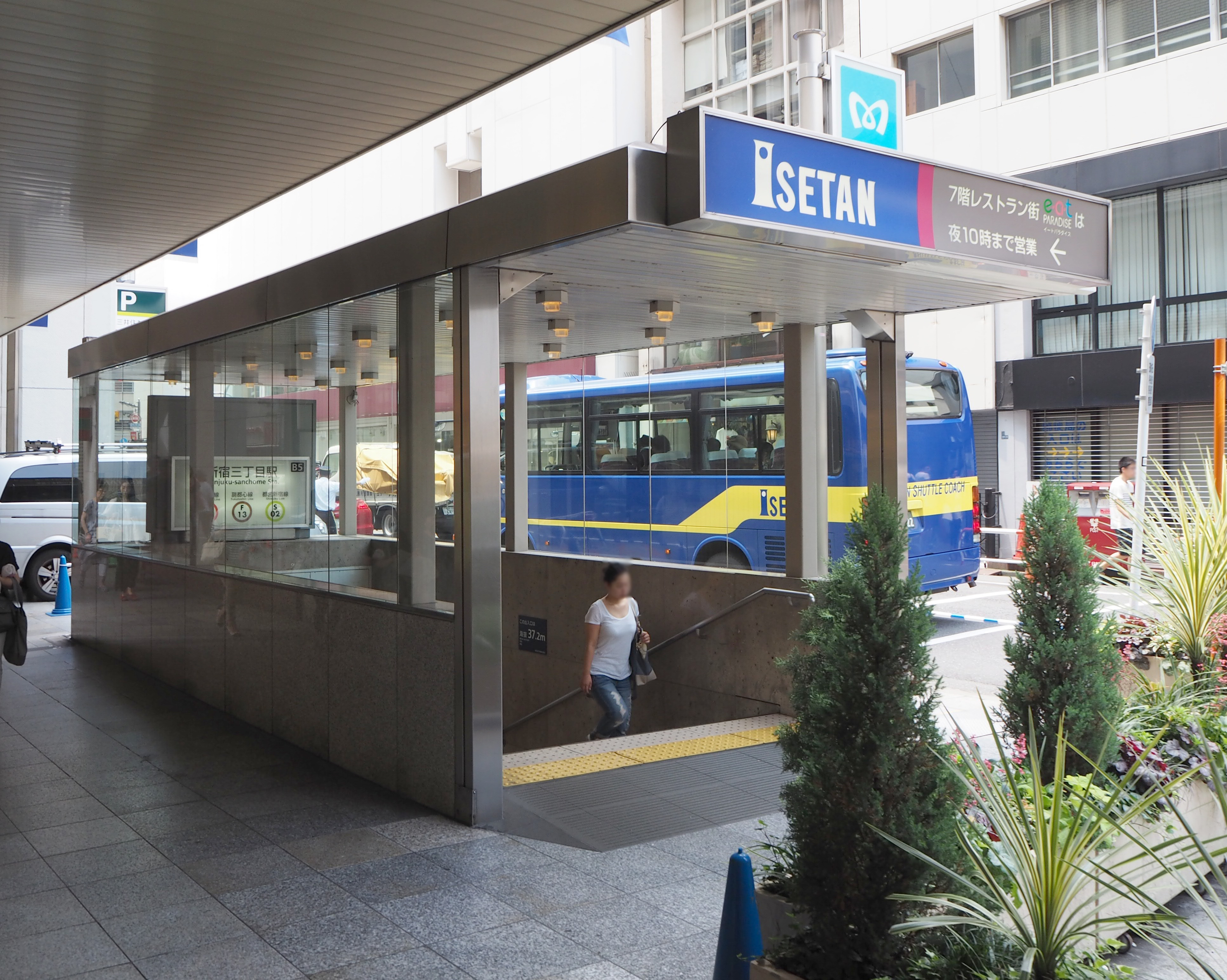
Entrance B5, next to Isetan department store, in July 2015

The station complex extends over a large area, with the Tokyo Metro Marunouchi Line and Toei Shinjuku Line platforms located in Shinjuku 3-chome (after which the station is named), and the Tokyo Metro Fukutoshin Line platforms located in Shinjuku 5-chome. The station concourse on the first basement ("B1F") level is connected to Shinjuku Station in the west by an underground pedestrian passage above the Marunouchi Line, called the Metro Promenade. Another underground passage between the two stations was completed in 2012, situated below the Kōshū Kaidō. The southern end of the Fukutoshin Line platform is linked to the Takashimaya Times Square complex by an underground passageway.

== Passenger statistics ==
In fiscal 2011, the Tokyo Metro station (Marunouchi and Fukutoshin Lines) was used by an average of 97,688 passengers daily, and the Toei station (Shinjuku Line) was used by an average of 50,458 passengers daily (alighting passengers only).

== See also ==
- List of railway stations in Japan
