= Ichigaya Kamiyashiki =

Edo-period daimyo residence in Ichigaya, Tokyo

Coordinates: 35.693°N 139.728°E

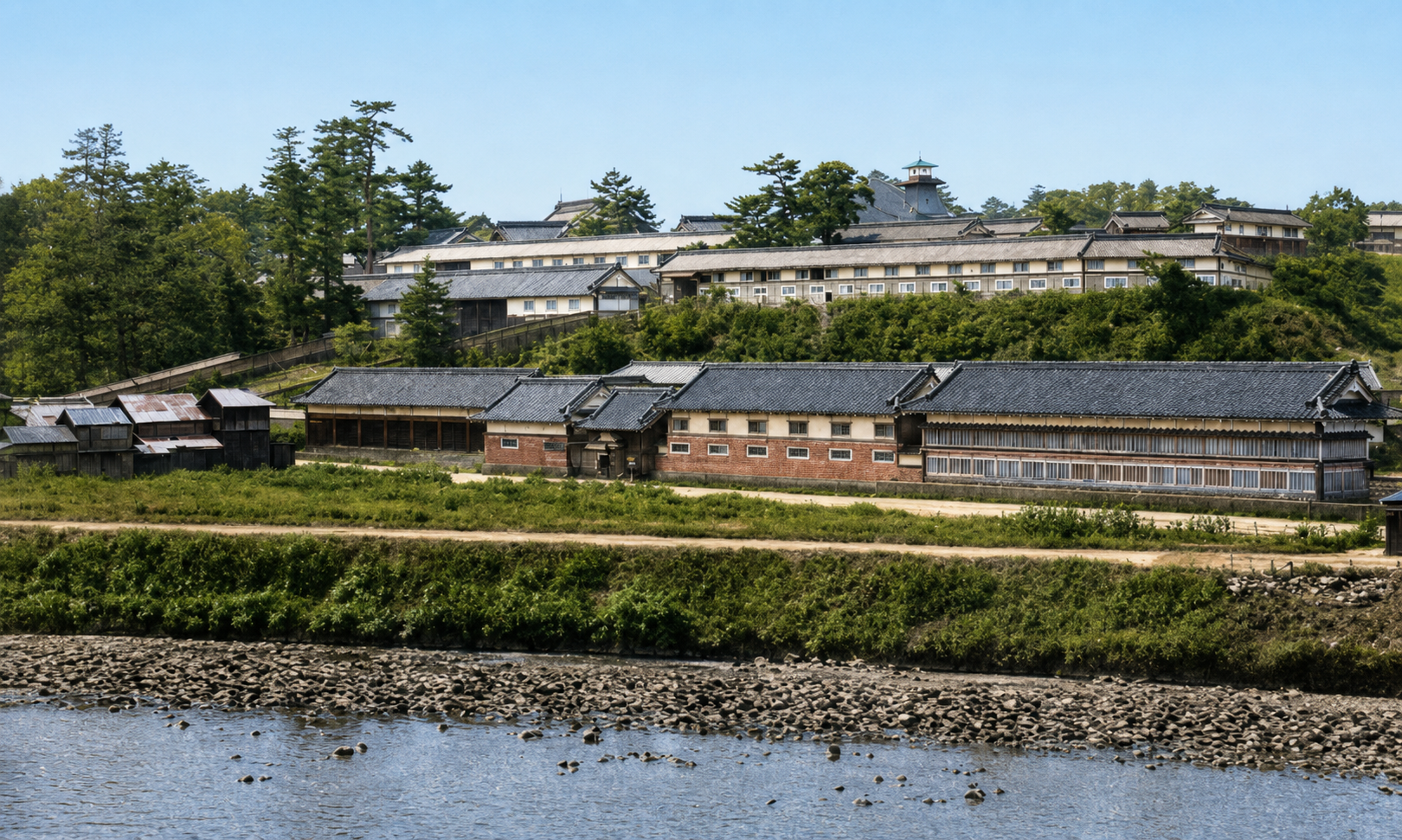
Colourised photograph of the kamiyashiki of Ichigaya, residence of the Owari Tokugawa family in Edo

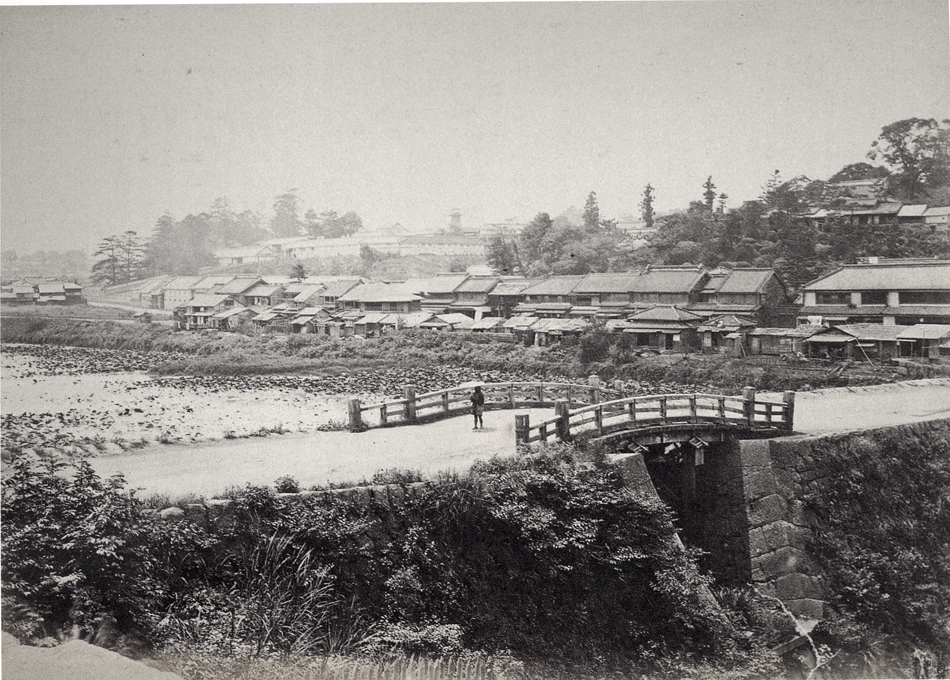
View of the kamiyashiki as seen across Ichigaya Gate Bridge (1872)

Ichigaya Kamiyashiki (市ヶ谷上屋敷) was the principal Edo residence (kamiyashiki) of the Owari branch of the Tokugawa clan during the Edo period. It was situated in the Ichigaya area on the western side of Edo Castle’s outer moat in what is now Shinjuku, Tokyo. The common name for the plateau area is Ichigaya Dai (市ヶ谷台).

The residence functioned as the primary political, administrative, and residential base of the Owari daimyō when they were present in Edo. In this capacity, it played a central role in maintaining the relationship between the domain and the Tokugawa shogunate.

== Overview ==
In the urban structure of Edo, large feudal lords maintained multiple residences, classified according to their function and location relative to Edo Castle. The principal residence, known as the kamiyashiki, was typically located closest to the castle and served as the main site of habitation for the daimyō, his family, and senior retainers, as well as the administrative center for domain affairs in the capital. Secondary residences, including nakayashiki and shimoyashiki, supplemented this function but were considered subordinate in status and purpose.

Within this system, the Ichigaya Kamiyashiki served as the highest-ranking Edo residence of the Owari Tokugawa family, one of the three senior collateral branches (gosanke) of the Tokugawa house. It was one element of a broader network of Edo estates maintained by the domain, including additional residences in other districts of the city.

== History ==
The origins are closely linked to the reorganization of Edo following the Great Fire of Meireki in 1657, which devastated much of the city. Prior to this event, the Owari Tokugawa clan maintained their principal residence closer to Edo Castle. In the aftermath of the fire, the shogunate oversaw a redistribution of urban space, and the Owari domain relocated its upper residence to a site west of the Ichigaya Gate on elevated terrain outside the castle precincts.

The site at Ichigaya offered both strategic and practical advantages, including proximity to major transportation routes and defensible topography overlooking the outer moat. From its establishment in the late seventeenth century until the end of the Edo period, the Ichigaya Kamiyashiki remained the principal Edo residence of the Owari Tokugawa clan. The residence also functioned as a site of official communication, ceremonial reception, and political negotiation.

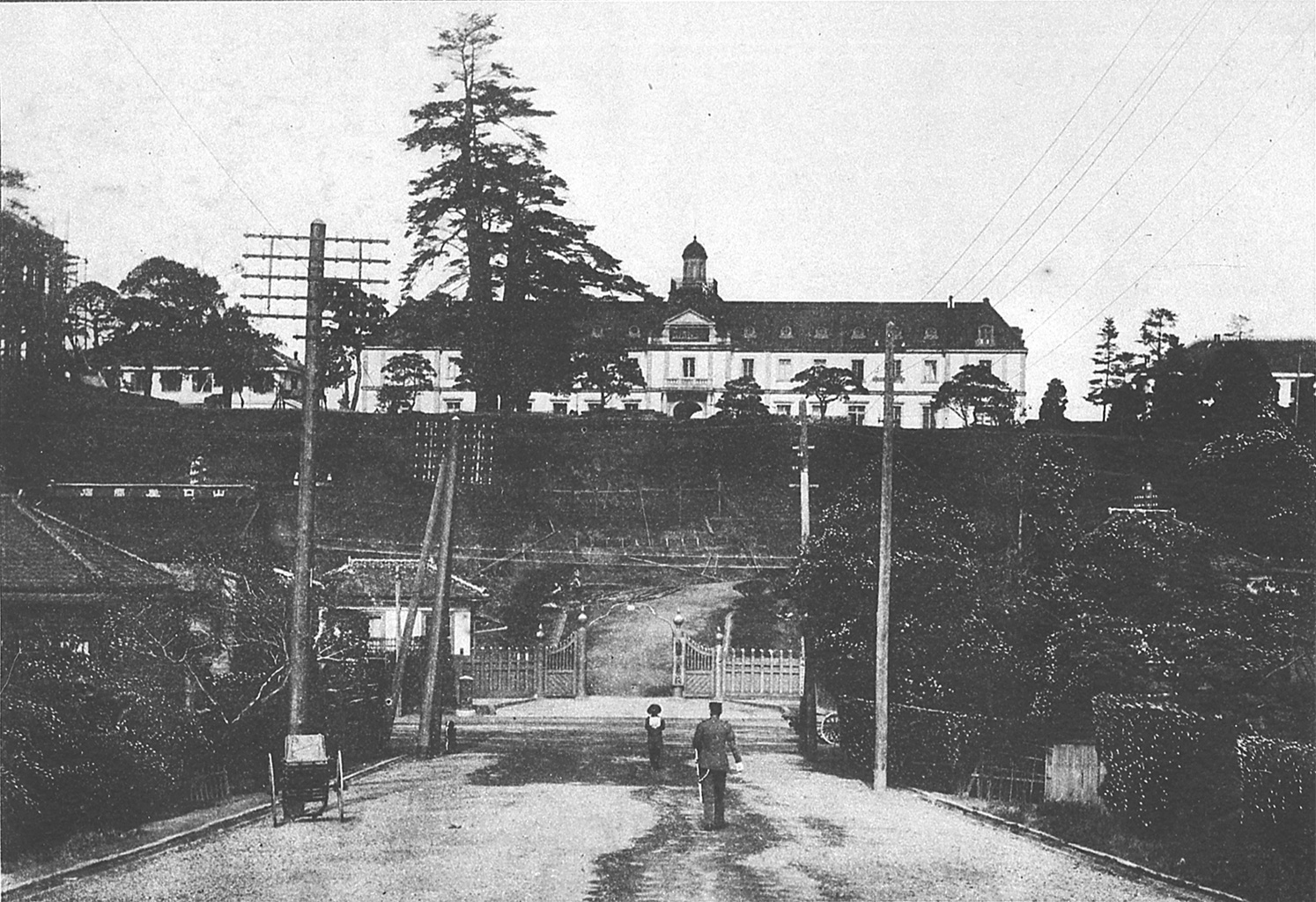
Photo of the rear of the Imperial Japanese Army Academy constructed on Ichigayadai, the former site of the kamiyashiki (1907)

Following the Meiji Restoration in 1868 and the abolition of the feudal system, the estate was dismantled as part of the broader transformation of former samurai lands into modern state property. The site subsequently came under military control and the Imperial Japanese Army Academy was built there for government use.

Today, much of the area formerly occupied by the Ichigaya Kamiyashiki corresponds to the grounds of Japan's Ministry of Defense complex in Ichigaya, reflecting the continuity of its strategic importance from the Edo period to the present.

In modern times, the former site of the Ichigaya Kamiyashiki has been investigated through archaeological excavations conducted in the Ichigaya Honmura-chō area. These investigations have revealed a wide range of remains associated with the former estate, including structural foundations, wells, drainage systems, and a variety of artifacts such as ceramics, roof tiles, and household objects.

The archaeological record confirms that the site was occupied over multiple periods, but the Edo-period layer corresponding to the daimyō residence is particularly well represented. These findings have contributed significantly to the understanding of the spatial organization and daily life of high-ranking samurai households in Edo.

== Architecture and layout ==
Although no original structures of the Ichigaya Kamiyashiki survive, archaeological findings and comparisons with other contemporaneous daimyō residences provide insight into its likely configuration. As with other large kamiyashiki compounds, it would have consisted of multiple interconnected buildings organized within a walled enclosure, incorporating both residential and administrative spaces.

The main compound would have included formal reception halls and living quarters for the lord, as well as separate inner quarters for women of the household. Surrounding structures likely accommodated retainers, service facilities, and storage areas, reflecting the complex social hierarchy within the estate.

A significant feature of the Ichigaya Kamiyashiki was its landscaped Japanese garden, known as Rakuraku-en (楽々園). This garden was designed in the style of a strolling pond garden, a characteristic form of Edo-period daimyō gardens centred on a large pond with winding paths and scenic viewpoints. Such gardens were multifunctional spaces that served not only aesthetic purposes but also political and social functions, including the reception of guests and performance of cultural activities such as tea gatherings.

Archaeological investigations at the Ichigaya Honmura-chō (市谷本村町) site have identified features consistent with garden design, including stone-lined channels that are interpreted as drainage or water management systems connected to a pond within the estate. These remains support historical accounts indicating the presence of a formal garden integrated into the residential complex.

Together, the buildings and garden formed a unified architectural and cultural landscape that expressed the authority and sophistication of the Owari Tokugawa family within Edo.

== See also ==
- List of Owari Tokugawa residences
