= Rokuichiro Masujima =

First British-Japanese lawyer (1857–1948)

Rokuichiro Masujima 増島六一郎
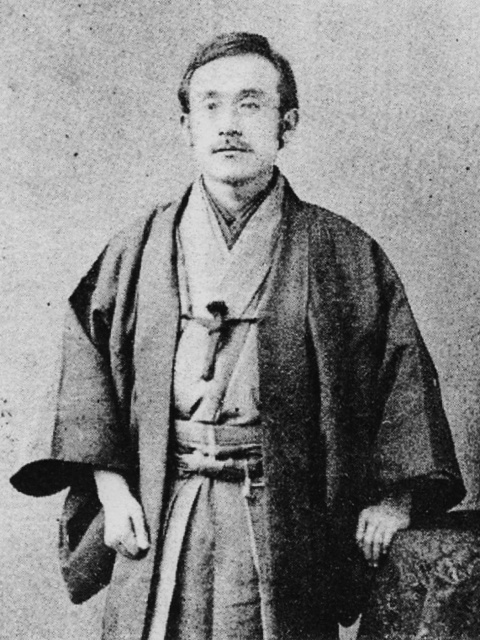
- Born: 1857; Present-day Japan
- Died: 1948 (aged 90–91)
- Occupations: Lawyer, diplomat
- Known for: Founder of Chuo University

Japanese name
- Kanji: 増島六一郎
Transcriptions
- Romanization: Rokuichiro Masujima

Rokuichiro Masujima (増島 六一郎, Masujima Rokuichirō; 1857–1948) was a British-Japanese international lawyer, diplomat, and legal adviser of the Japanese Ambassador to London, member of Middle Temple and founder of Chuo University.

== Biography ==
Masujima's first name, Rokuichiro, was given to him because his father was 61 years old when he was born; roku-ju-ichi means 61 in Japanese.

He graduated law school later before his fellow Chuo University founders; he also graduated from the University of Tokyo in 1879 in the Law School after his talent was recognized by the founder of Mitsubishi, Yataro Iwasaki, who took him to England. There, Majusima started at Middle Temple in 1881 to 1883. During the year, entrance fees were £50; in addition, he was asked to pay £100, which would be reimbursed when he had become barrister. This £100 was used for a grant for employment as a barrister in the Inns of Court after he was required to attend four schools in one year, although the schooling term consisted of dinner at the cafeteria of Inns Court and listening to the reading of books on a statutory law at either time of the dinners and active debate regarding legal issues and current events. He passed the required written oral examination, which is held in Lincoln's Inn cafeteria, the largest of the four schools. He was called to the bar at Middle Temple in 1883 and moved back to Japan; he was one of the first Japanese to become a barrister in England.

He retired from the field of education and began to practice law. Masujima worked as a public relations lawyer, mainly dealing with public relations litigation cases and corporate law. His achievements and fame led to him being given honorary membership of the Canadian Bar Association and the New York State Bar Association. His office expanded from Tokyo to Yokohama, Kobe, and Shanghai.

In 1934, Masujima founded the Sei-Kiu-Do Common Law Library, later called the Sei-Kiu-Do Common Law Institute, originally located on his lands in the middle of Tokyo. His motivation was to develop a central theory of law that offered justice. At the time, Japanese law was governed by a mixture of customary law, German civil code, and part of the English law merchant.

At some point during the 1930s, Masujima met Martin Taylor, President of the New York State Bar Association, on the deck of an Atlantic transport liner, which was waiting for the tide in the Thames. A strong friendship developed between the two men, which led to the setting up of the Common Law Foundation in America.

At the outbreak of the Second World War, Masujima was unable to return to Japan for two years. The Sei-Kiu-Do Common Law Library suffered greatly from bomb damage. After the war, Anglo-American Law Research became popular in Japan, and his library was deposited in the Supreme Court of Japan in 1949, after his death.

The logo of Chuo University

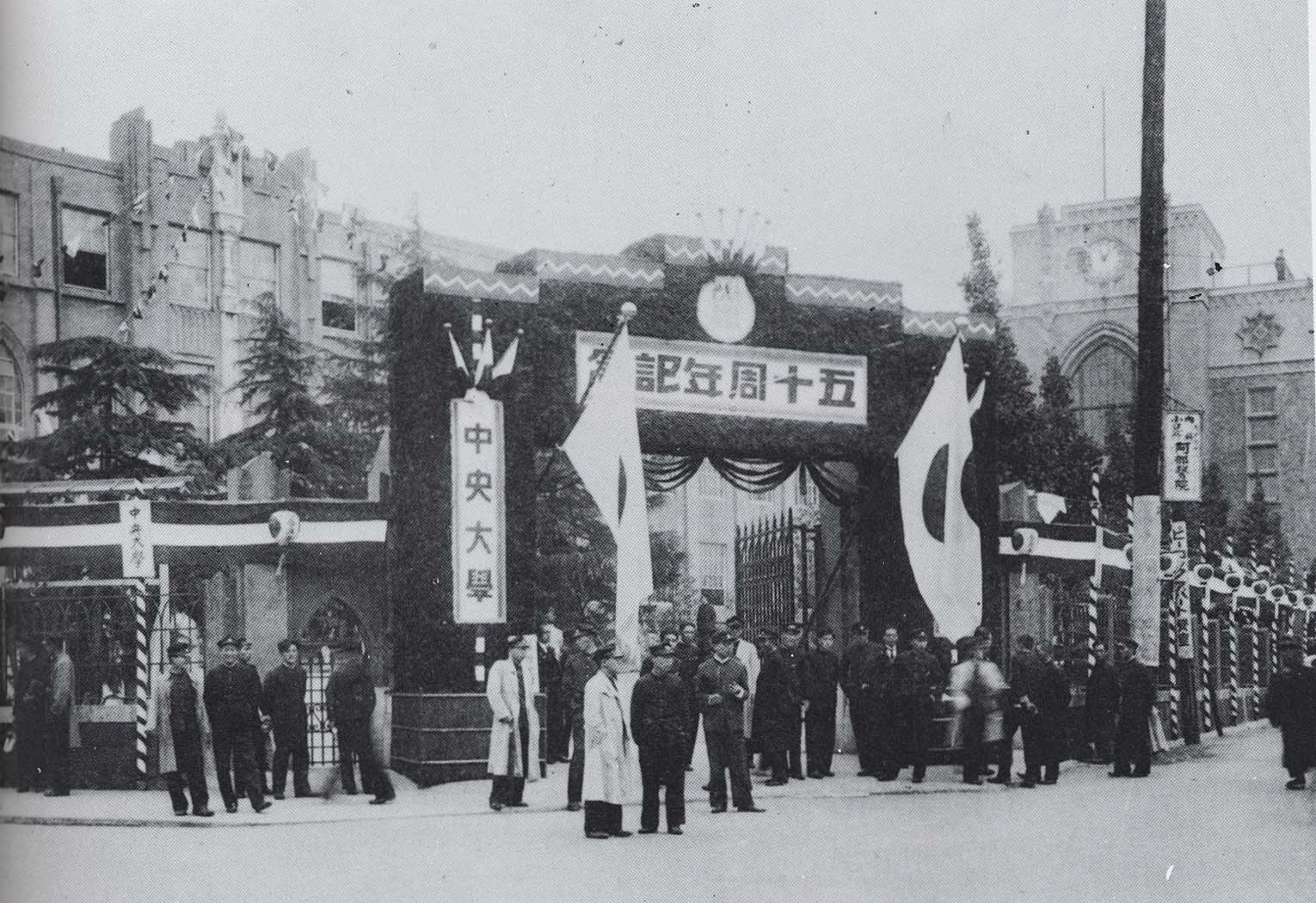
Chuo University in 1935

== Chuo University establishment ==
In 1885, Rokuichiro Masujima led some fellow 18 young attorneys to established the English law school as a research institute focusing on Anglo-American Common Law, which in 1905 was later renamed to "Chuo University" and it began operating as a college for legal, financial and political field. The word "Chuo" is said to be derived from the Japanese words "Chuo Ho-in" translated in English as Legal Training Institution Middle Temple where together with the other co-founder of Chuo University Masujima studied in England.

After the establishment of Chuo, Masujima became the first director of the institution.
