= Shinjuku-gyoemmae Station =

Metro station in Tokyo, Japan

Coordinates: 35.688577°N 139.710764°E

Shinjuku-gyoemmae Station 新宿御苑前駅

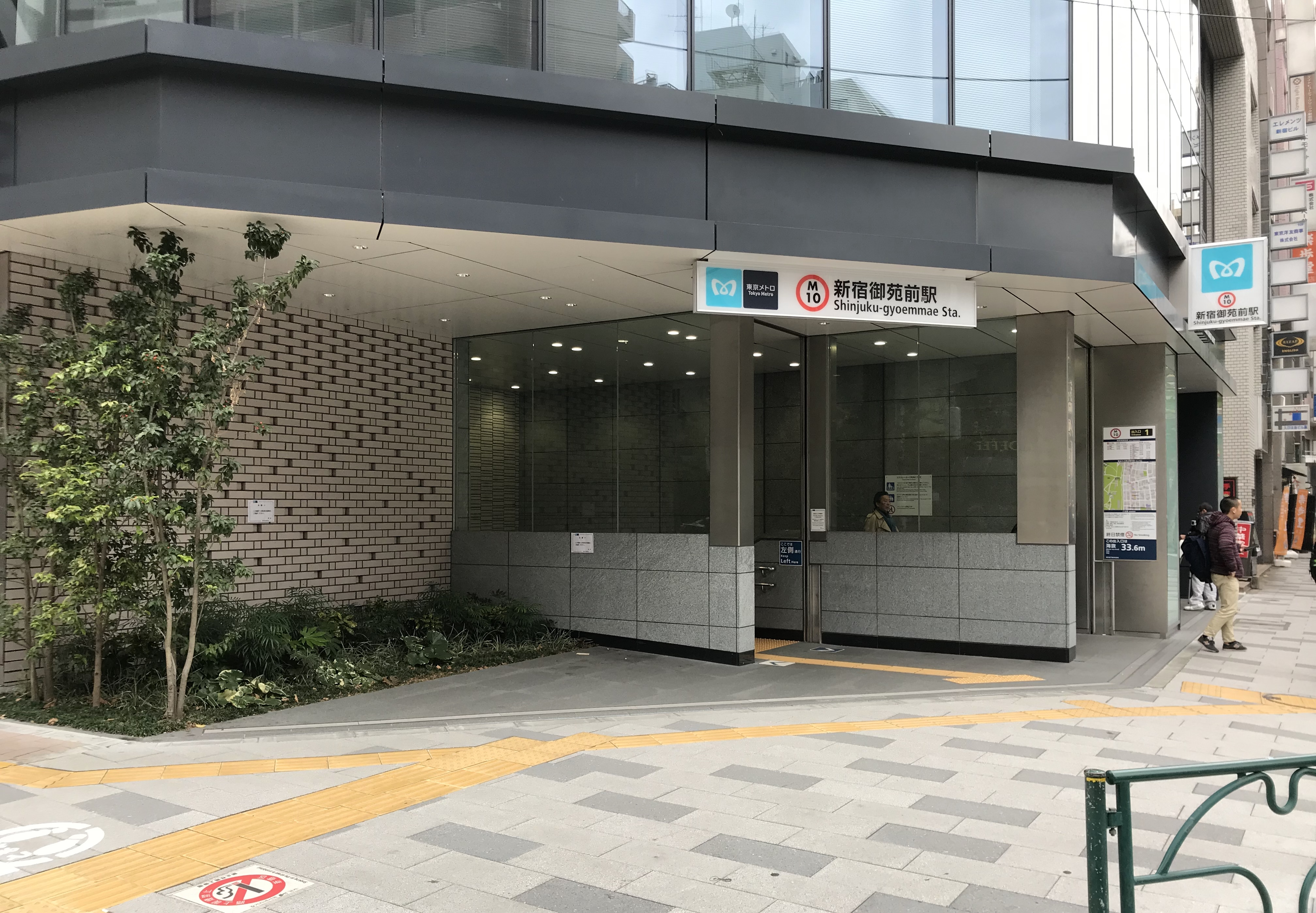
- Exit1 in December 2019

General information
- Location: Shinjuku, Tokyo; Japan
- Operator: Tokyo Metro
- Line: Marunouchi Line
- Platforms: 2 side platforms
- Tracks: 2

Construction
- Structure type: Underground

Other information
- Station code: M-10

History
- Opened: 15 March 1959; 67 years ago

Services
Preceding station	Tokyo Metro	Following station
Shinjuku-sanchōme towards Ogikubo or Hōnanchō	Marunouchi Line	Yotsuya-sanchōme towards Ikebukuro
Location
- Location within Tokyo Yamanote Loop Location within Tokyo wards area Location within Japan

Shinjuku-gyoemmae Station (Japanese: 新宿御苑前駅, Hepburn: Shinjuku-gyoen-mae-eki) is a subway station on the Tokyo Metro Marunouchi Line in Shinjuku, Tokyo, Japan, operated by the Tokyo subway operator Tokyo Metro. It is numbered "M-10".

== Lines ==
Shinjuku-gyoemmae Station is served by the Tokyo Metro Marunouchi Line.

== Platforms ==
The station consists of two side platforms serving two tracks.

1	Marunouchi Line	for Shinjuku, Nakano-Sakaue, and Ogikubo
2	Marunouchi Line	for Ginza, Otemachi, and Ikebukuro

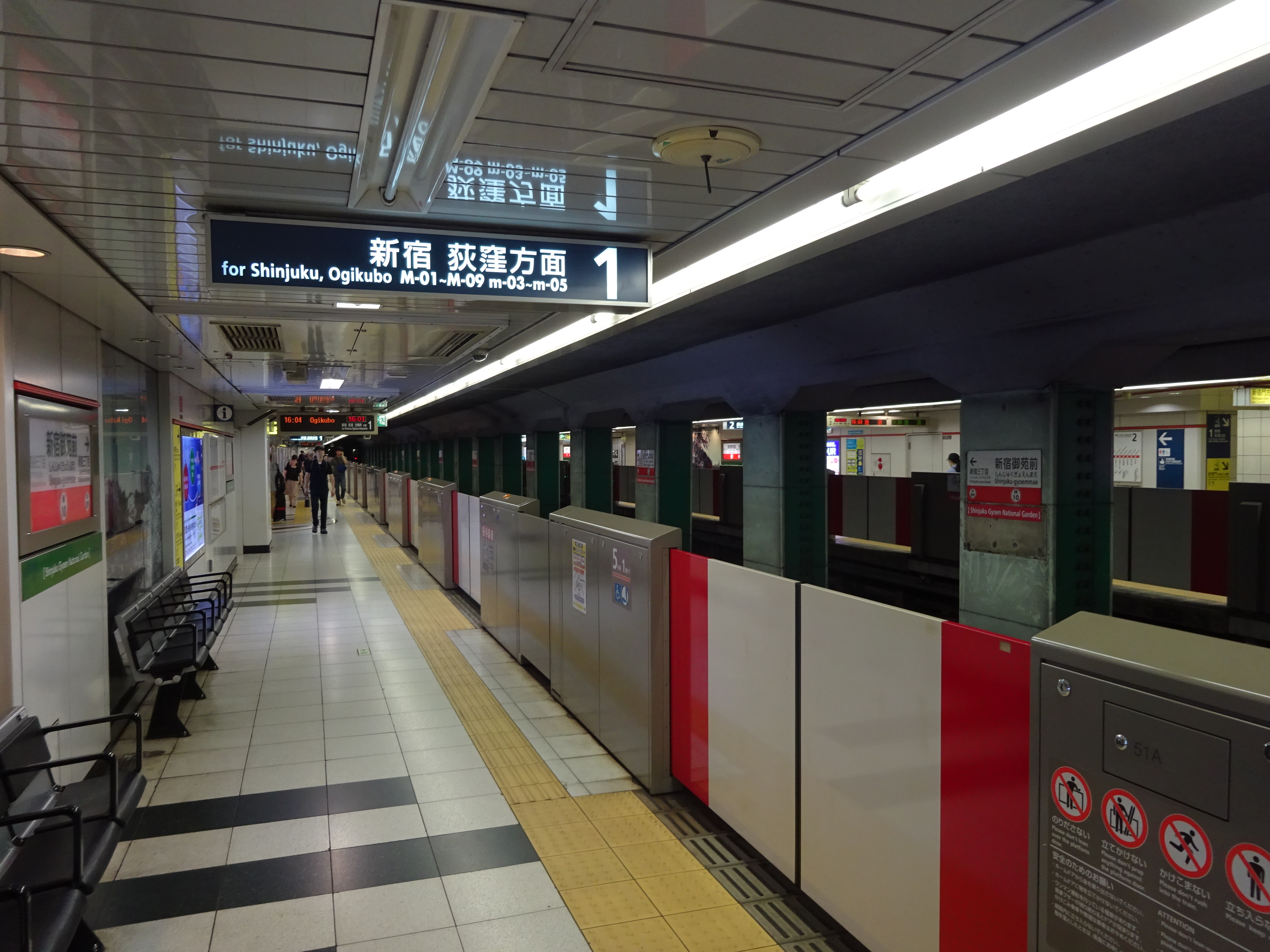
Platform

== History ==
Shinjuku-gyoemmae Station opened on 15 March 1959.

The station facilities were inherited by Tokyo Metro after the privatization of the Teito Rapid Transit Authority (TRTA) in 2004.

== Surrounding area ==
- Shinjuku Gyoen National Garden, which the station is named after
