= Micky Yanai =

Japanese pornographic actor

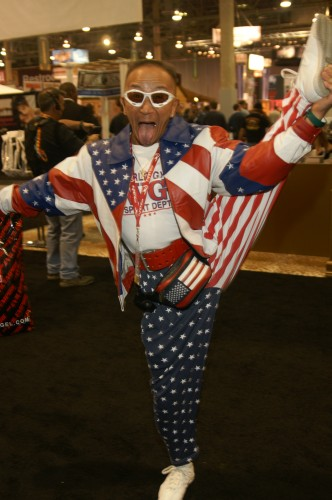
Mick Yanai at 2008 AVN Adult Entertainment Expo

Micky Yanai (Japanese: ミッキー 柳井, b. 1959) is a well-known Japanese male porn actor.

== Life and career ==
Yanai is supposedly the inventor of an acrobatic sexual technique called the "Helicopter Fuck", although it is said such a technique was already seen in the Kama Sutra, or at least in the Cosmopolitan magazine version of it. He demonstrated his proficiency at the technique with a series of videos for the KMP Million label in 2004. (See Filmography)

Yanai has become one of the few Japanese male porn stars known in the West through a group of videos produced by V&R Planning and released internationally in the United States and elsewhere in 2003 and 2004 by V&R International in uncensored form: Paradise of Japan 14: Helicopter Man (with Misuzu Akimoto), Paradise of Japan 22: Helicopterman 2, and Paradise of Japan 28: Helicopterman 3.

== Partial filmography ==
Release date	Video Title	Company & ID	Actresses
2004-01-22	Cosplay 3 - Mio Asakura あゆっちゃおっかな～。3 朝倉海音	KMP Million; MILV-121 (VHS)	Mio Asakura
2004-02-27	8 Hours with Nao Oikawa 及川奈央 8時間いいとこどり	KMP Million; MILV-133 (VHS)	Nao Oikawa & Hitomi Hasegawa
2004-03-19	Let's Watch Kisaragi's Growth 如月カレンの成長を見守ろう！ 完全版	KMP Million; MILV-142 (VHS)	Karen Kisaragi
2004-03-26	How to Perfect 上原深雪 4時間	KMP Million; MILV-144 (VHS)	Miyuki Uehara
2004-04-23	Momo Hoshino Has Come Back 星野桃がミリオンで大復活だー！！	KMP Million; MILV-151 (VHS)	Momo Hoshino
2004-05-28	Implication 完全攻略 中島京子	KMP Million; MILV-170 (VHS)	Kyoko Nakajima
2004-06-18	Double Boin ダブルボインでごはん何杯でも食べられる！	KMP Million; MILV-177 (VHS)	Mai Haruna & Yui Asahina

== Sources ==
- Mickey Yanai at IMDb
- Milton, Bradley (March 2003). "Paradise of Japan 14: Helicopter Man". www.avn.com.
- "Porn star woos thousands of women with his whirlybird whirl". Mainichi Shimbun. December 1, 2004.
