= Tatsuo Kainaka =

Tatsuo Kainaka (甲斐中 辰夫, Kainaka Tatsuo; born January 2, 1940) became an attorney at law after serving as a member of the Supreme Court of Japan, Superintending Prosecutor of Tokyo High Public Prosecutors Office and so on.
