= Hiroshi Yanai (publisher) =

Japanese businessperson (born 1950)

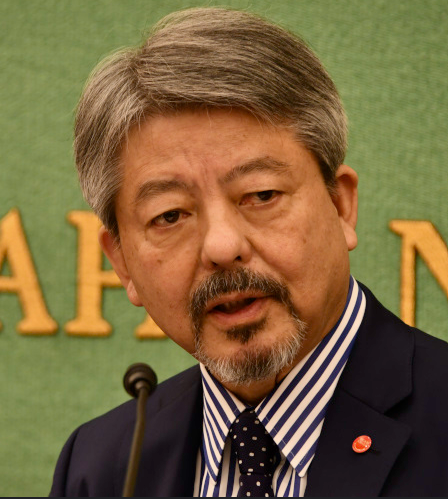
Hiroshi Yanai at Japan National Press Club in 2020

Hiroshi Yanai (矢内 廣; born 7 January 1950 in Iwaki, Fukushima) is a Japanese businessperson. He is the founder and CEO of Pia Corporation, which is known as Japan’s first ticket distribution service.

== Career ==
While he studied law at Chuo University in 1972, Yanai founded the monthly information magazine Pia together with his friends. In 1974, he established Pia Corporation. In 1984, he launched Ticket Pia, Japan’s first computer-based online ticketing service. Pia Corporation was listed on the Second Section of the Tokyo Stock Exchange in 2002 and moved to the First Section (now Prime Market) in 2003. In 2020 it opened the Pia Arena MM, a 10,000-seat concert and sports venue in Yokohama’s Minato Mirai district.

Yanai also oversaw the creation of Pia Film Festival, established to promote young filmmakers and independent cinema in Japan. In 2012, Yanai founded the non-profit organization Team Smile, dedicated to revitalizing communities affected by the 2011 Tōhoku earthquake and tsunami through music and entertainment.

== Public roles ==
In addition to his business activities, Yanai has served in numerous public and cultural positions, including Chairman of Pia Film Festival, Director of the Japan Magazine Publishers Association. In the past, he also served as the General Event Producer for Expo 2005.”

== Awards ==
- 2014 – Kawakita Award (for contributions to film culture)
- 2017 – Watanabe Shin Award for achievements in the entertainment sector
- 2023 – Fukushima Prefecture Governor’s Commendation for distinguished contribution outside the prefecture
- 2026 – Person of Cultural Merit
