= Yotsuya-sanchōme Station =

Metro station in Tokyo, Japan

Coordinates: 35.68796°N 139.720227°E

Yotsuya-sanchōme Station 四谷三丁目駅

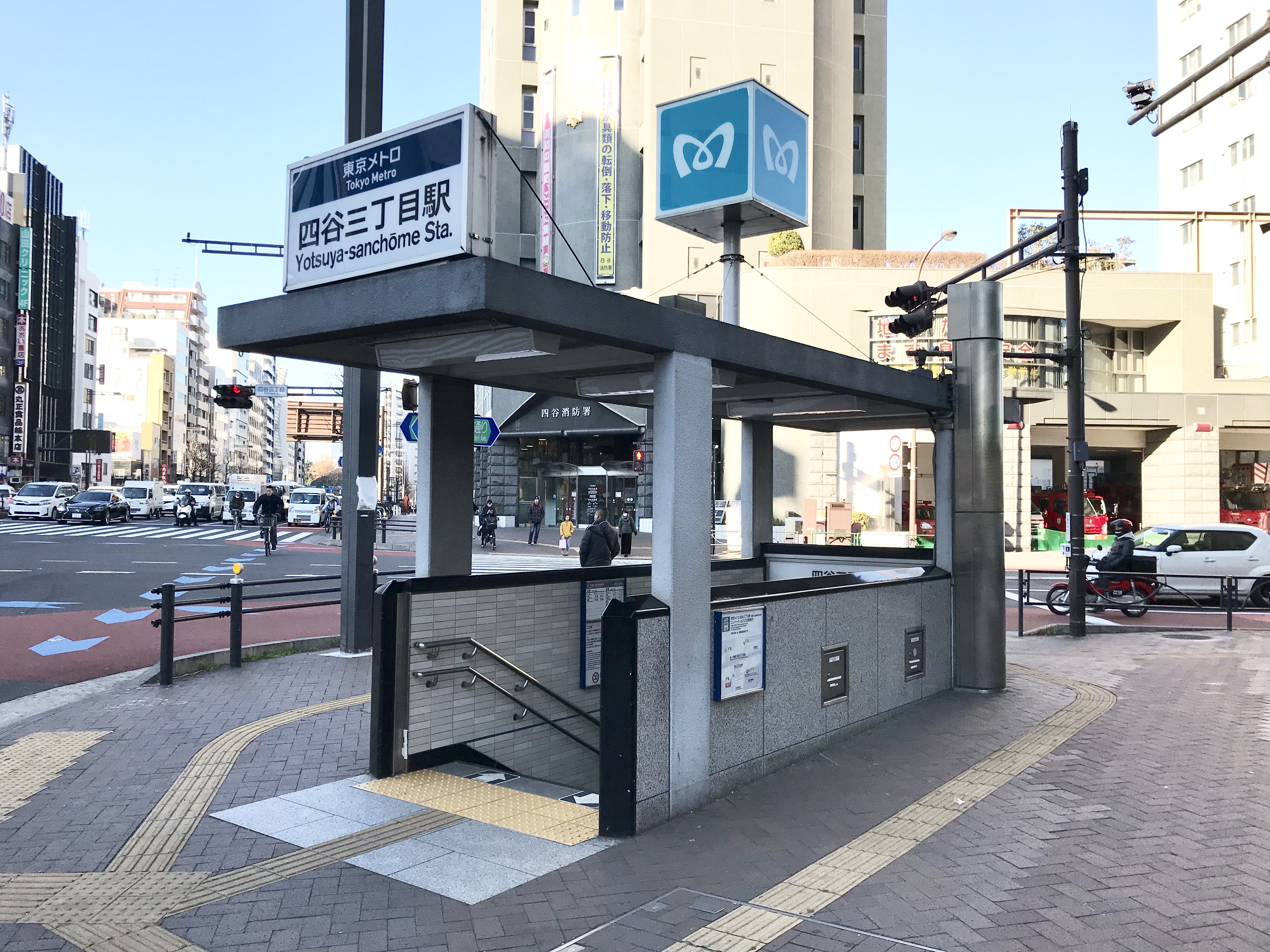
- Exit 4 in January 2019

General information
- Location: Shinjuku, Tokyo; Japan
- Operator: Tokyo Metro
- Line: Marunouchi Line
- Platforms: 2 side platforms
- Tracks: 2

Construction
- Structure type: Underground

Other information
- Station code: M-11

History
- Opened: 15 March 1959; 67 years ago

Services
Preceding station	Tokyo Metro	Following station
Shinjuku-gyoemmae towards Ogikubo or Hōnanchō	Marunouchi Line	Yotsuya towards Ikebukuro
Location
- Location within Tokyo Yamanote Loop Location within Tokyo wards area Location within Japan

Yotsuya-sanchōme Station (四谷三丁目駅, Yotsuya-sanchōme-eki) is a railway station in Shinjuku, Tokyo Prefecture, Japan on the Tokyo Metro Marunouchi Line. Its station number is M-11.

== Station layout ==
Yotsuya-sanchōme Station consists of two side platforms. Platform one is for trains bound for Shinjuku, Ogikubo and Nakano-fujimichō, and platform two is for trains bound for Ginza and Ikebukuro. As of 2011, there is an underground passageway connecting both platforms.

=== Platforms ===
1	Marunouchi Line	for Shinjuku, Nakano-sakaue, and Ogikubo
2	Marunouchi Line	for Ginza, Ōtemachi, and Ikebukuro

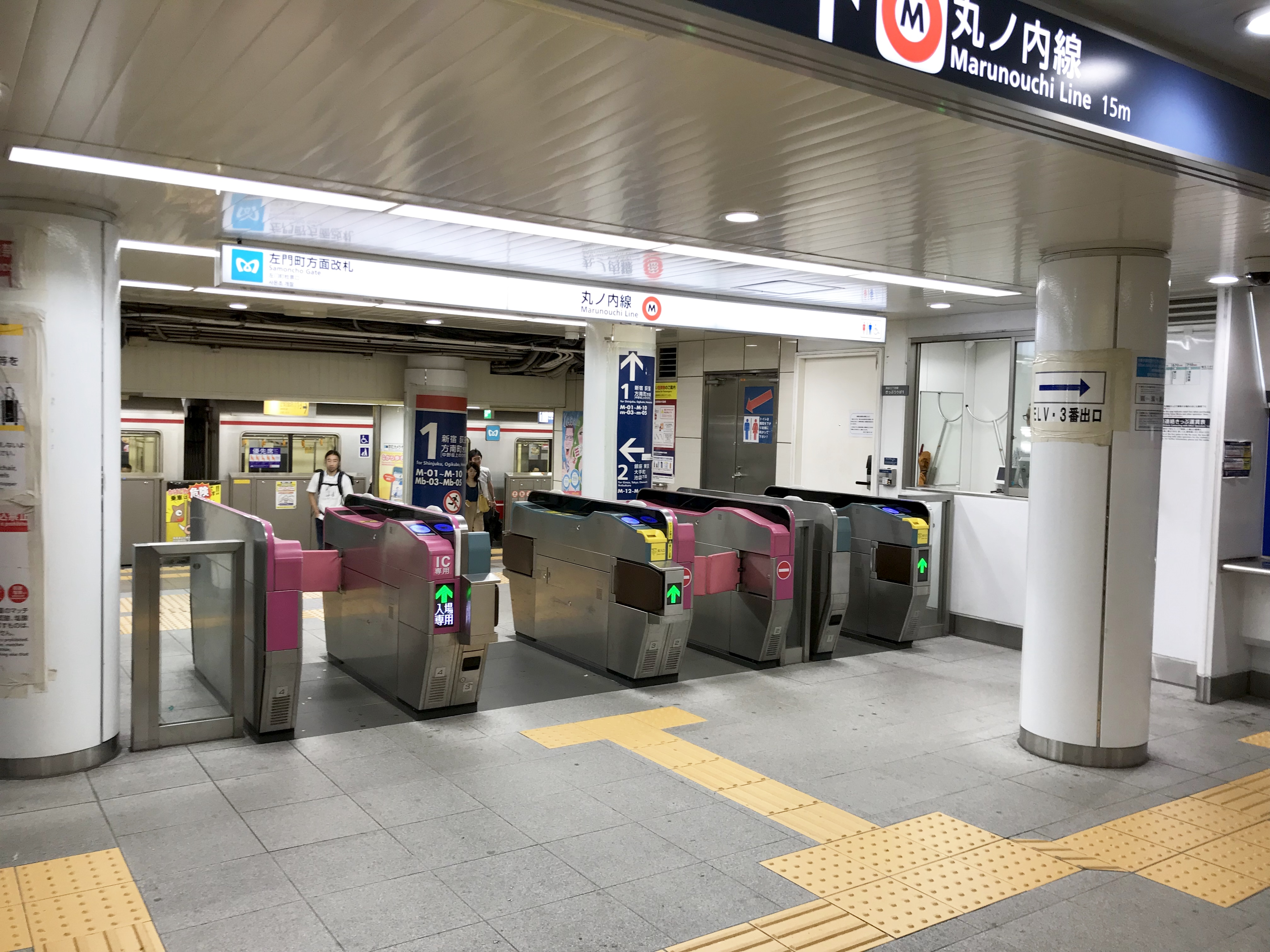
The ticket gates, August 2019

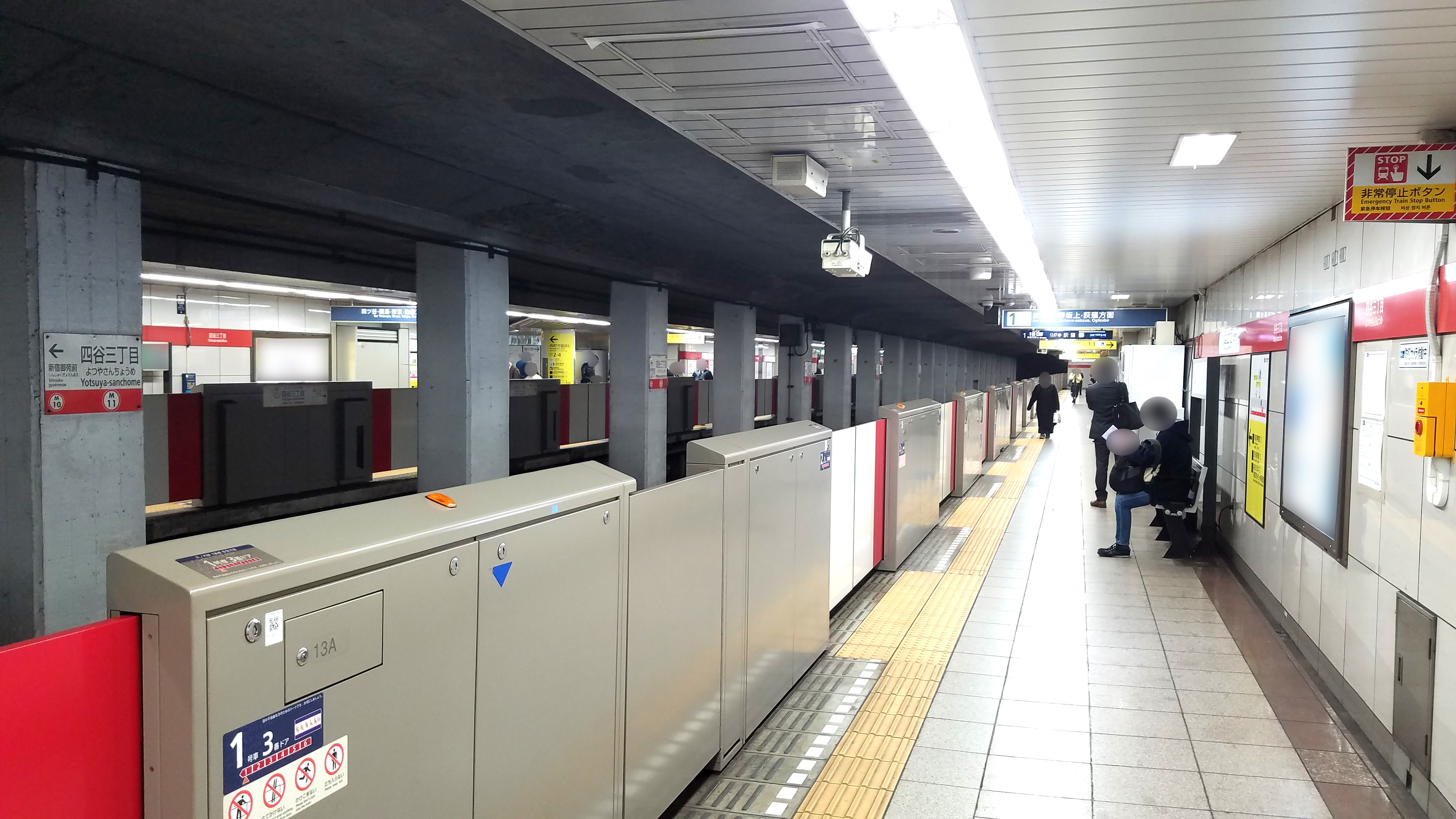
The platform, March 2022

== History ==
Yotsuya-sanchōme Station opened on 15 March 1959.

The station facilities were inherited by Tokyo Metro after the privatization of the Teito Rapid Transit Authority (TRTA) in 2004.

== Surrounding area ==
The station is underneath the intersection of National Route 20 (Kōshū Kaidō / Shinjuku-dōri) and Tokyo Metropolitan Route 319 (Gaien-Higashi-dōri). Other points of interest include:

- Yotsuya Police Station
- Tokyo Fire Museum
- NTT Yotsuya Building
- Sōka Gakkai headquarters
- Toei Shinjuku Line Akebonobashi Station (8 minutes walk north)
- JR East Chūō-Sōbu Line Shinanomachi Station (10 minutes walk south)

== Connecting bus service ==
Stop: Yotsuya-Sanchome

- Shina 97 for Shinagawa Station, Shinjuku Station (west exit)
- Sō 81 for Sōdai-seimon (Waseda University), Shibuya Station (east exit)
- Night express for Mitaka Station (north exit)
