= Akebonobashi Station =

Metro station in Tokyo, Japan

Akebonobashi Station 曙橋駅

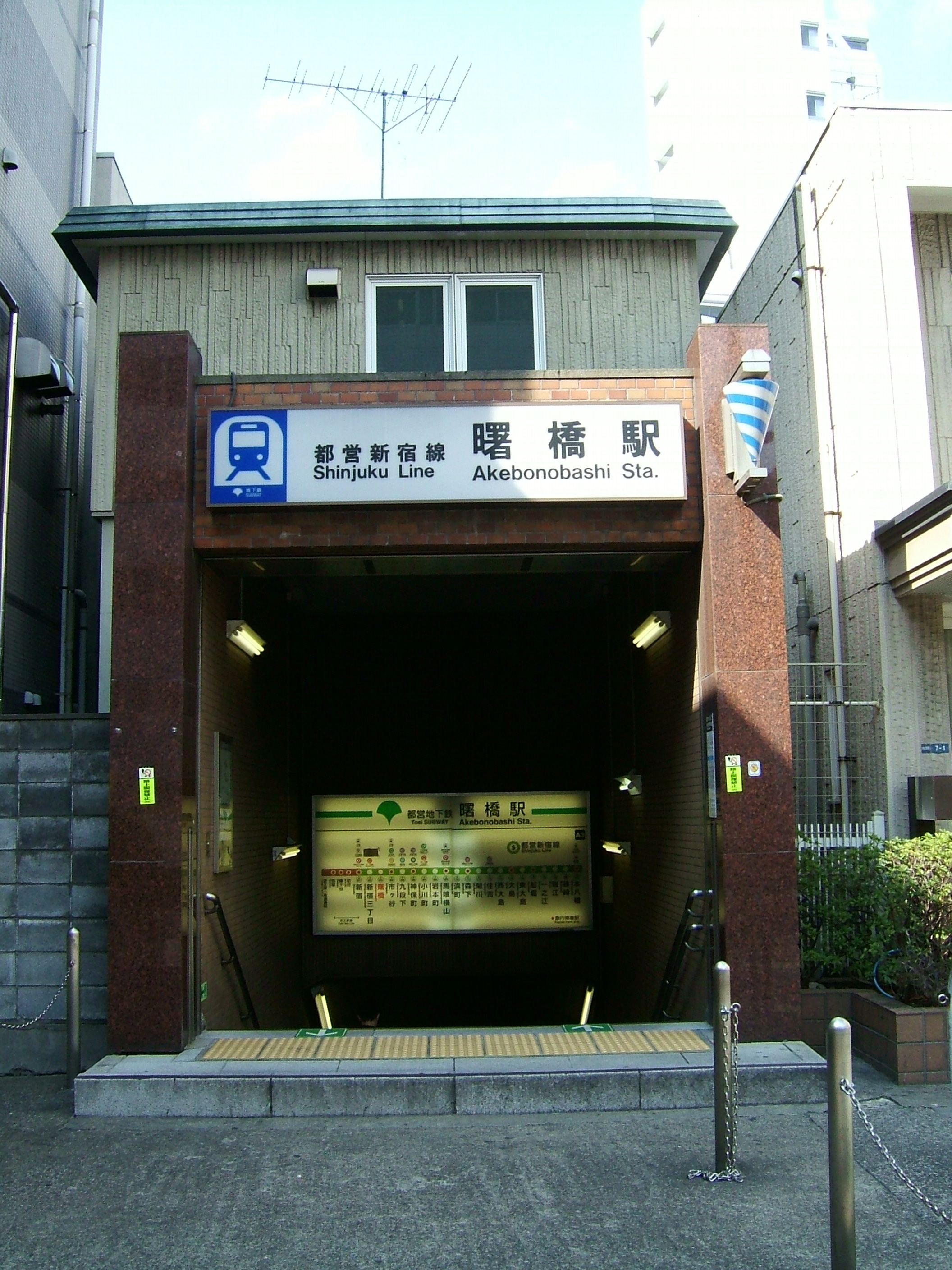
- Entrance to Akebonobashi Station, March 2008

General information
- Location: 7-1 Sumiyoshi-chō, Shinjuku City, Tokyo （東京都新宿区住吉町7-1） Japan
- Coordinates: 35°41′32.6″N 139°43′22″E
- Operator: Toei Subway
- Line: Shinjuku Line
- Platforms: 2 side platforms
- Tracks: 2
- Connections: Bus stop

Construction
- Structure type: Underground

Other information
- Station code: S-03

History
- Opened: 16 March 1980; 46 years ago

Passengers
- 36,738 daily

Services
Preceding station	Toei Subway	Following station
Shinjuku-sanchōme towards Shinjuku	Shinjuku Line Local	Ichigaya towards Motoyawata
Location
- Location within Tokyo Yamanote Loop Location within Tokyo wards area Location within Japan

Akebonobashi Station (曙橋駅, Akebonobashi-eki) is a subway station on the Toei Shinjuku Line in Shinjuku, Tokyo, Japan, operated by Toei Subway. Its station number is S-03.

== Lines ==
Akebonobashi Station is served by the Toei Shinjuku Line.

== Platforms ==
Akebonobashi Station consists of two side platforms. Platform 1 is for trains bound for Shinjuku, Sasazuka and Hashimoto, and Platform 2 is for trains bound for Bakuro-yokoyama and Motoyawata.

1	Shinjuku Line	for Shinjuku; Keiō Line for Hatsudai, Hatagaya, Meidaimae, Chōfu, and Hashimoto
2	Shinjuku Line	for Bakuro-yokoyama and Motoyawata

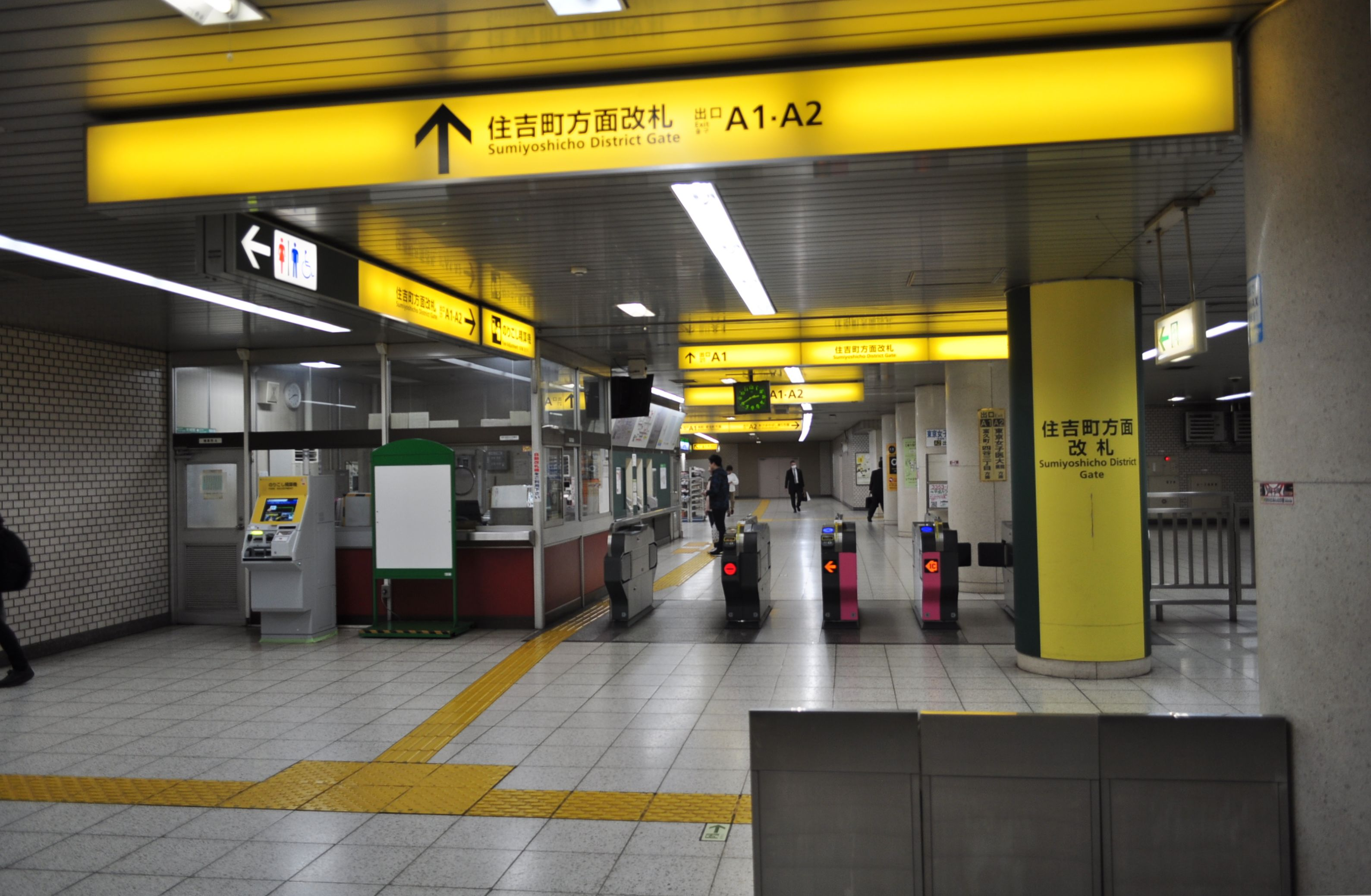
Ticket gates, March 2018

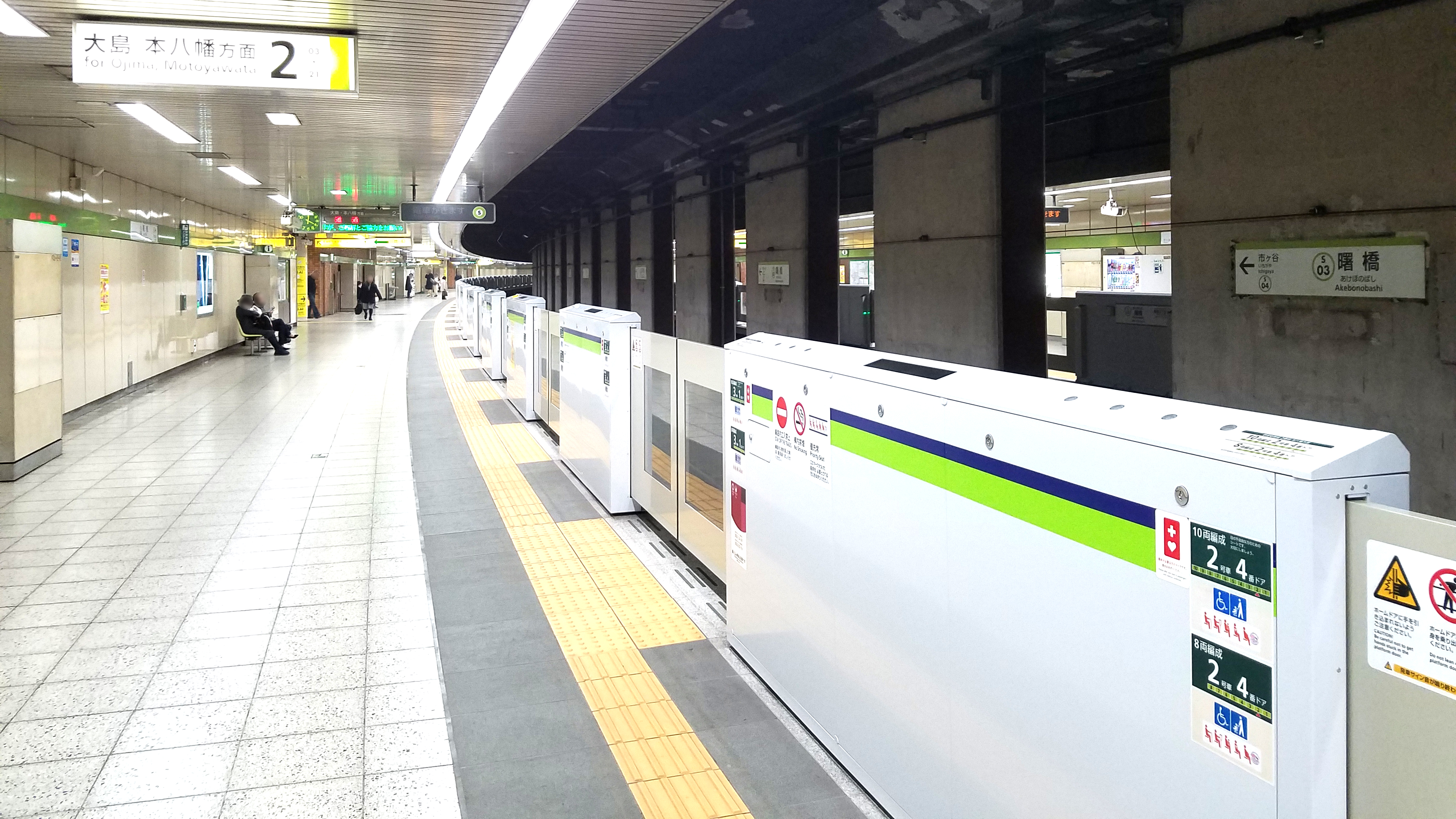
Platforms, December 2019

== History ==
The station opened on March 16, 1980.

== Surrounding area ==
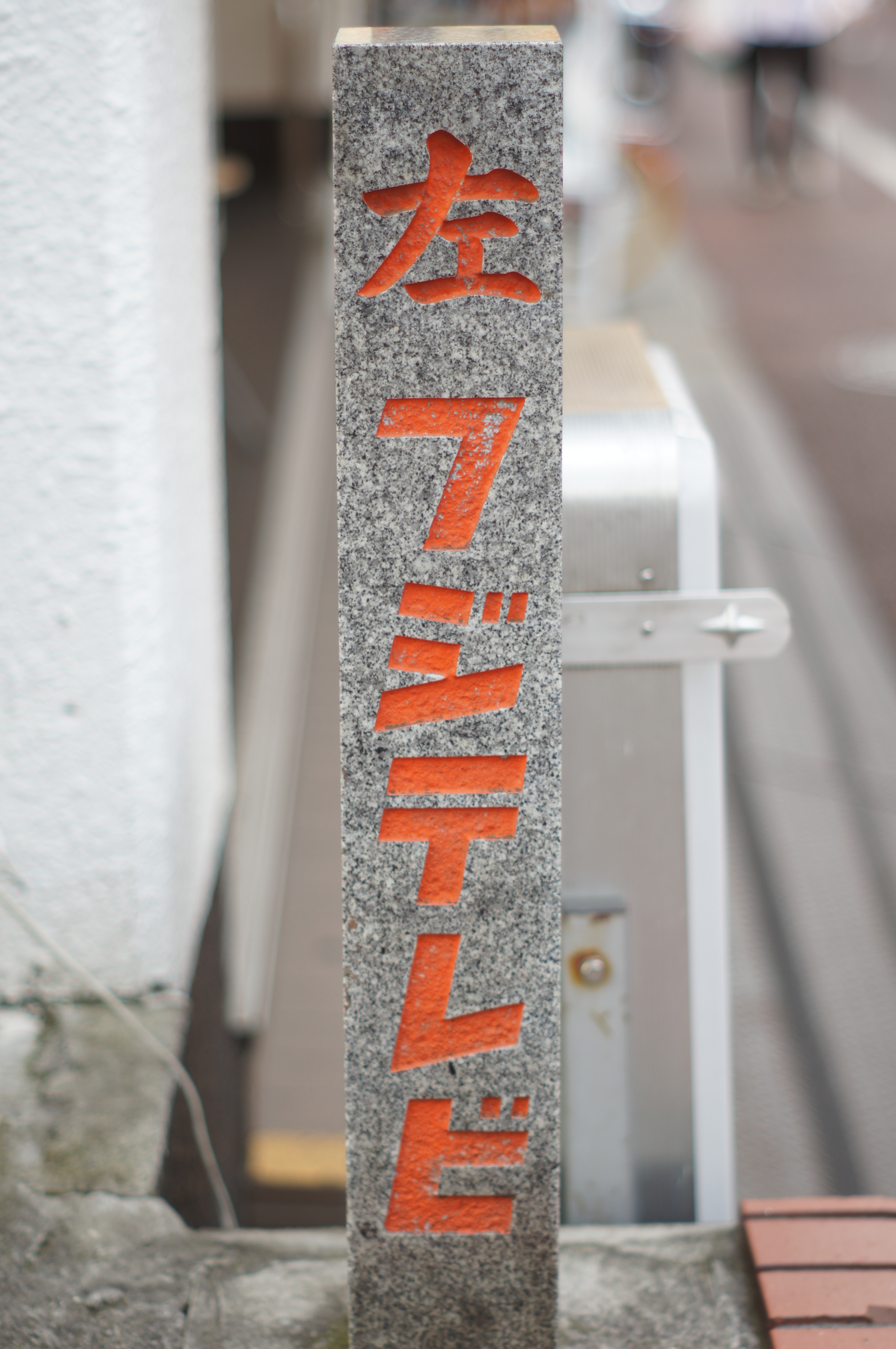
Old signpost remaining for the former headquarters of Fuji Television in the nearby shopping street

The station lies beneath Akebonobashi, a bridge at the intersection of Tokyo Metropolitan Route 319 (Gaien-Higashi-dōri) and Metropolitan Route 302 (Yasukuni-dōri). The former headquarters of Fuji Television were located nearby, but have since been redeveloped into a high-rise apartment complex named Kawadacho Confo Garden. Other points of interest include:

- Ministry of Defense
- Chuo University, Ichigaya Campus
- Tokyo Women's Medical University and Hospital
- Akebonobashi-dōri shopping street (The former name was Fuji Television street)
- Yotsuya-sanchōme Station (Tokyo Metro Marunouchi Line) (8 minutes walk south)
- Ushigome-yanagichō Station (Toei Ōedo Line) (10 minutes walk north)

== Connecting bus services ==
Stop: Akebonobashi

- Shiro 61 for Shinjuku Station (west exit), Nerima Garage

Stop: Arakichō

- Sō 81 for Sōdai-seimon (Waseda University), Shibuya Station (east exit)

Stop: Kappazaka-shita

- Taka 71 for Kudanshita Station, Takadanobaba Station (via Ōkubo-dōri)
- Shuku 75 for Shinjuku Station (west exit), Miyakezaka (via Tokyo Women's Medical University)
