= Tadahiko Fukuhara =

Professor Tadahiko Fukuhara
- Born: 1954 (age 71–72); Shiga Prefecture
- Education: Chuo University
- Occupations: Civil law, Lecturer
- Title: President and chancellor of the Chuo University
- Term: 2011

Tadahiko Fukuhara (born 1954) is a Japanese academics, professor of civil law, member of the board of INES Corp and Japan Payment Service Association. In 2011 he became the president and chancellor of Chuo University, prior to that he was dean of the Chuo Graduate Law School at the Chuo University.

== Education ==
Fukuhara was born in Shiga Prefecture, Japan. He holds a bachelor's degree at Chuo University in Faculty in 1977 and also graduated from Chuo Graduate School of Law in 1984 honored with PhD.

== Academic career ==
Fukuhara began to working as a lecturer II in the faculty of law at Chuo University there in 1995 he became professor in Chuo Law School then in 2007 he was dean at the faculty of law, Chuo Law School to 2008 where he was director of Chuo University Educational Corporation till 2011.

Fukuhara was also member of the Working Committee of the Council for the Institution of Universities under the Ministry of Education as well as ministries of sports, culture science and technology. He held the position of permanent director of the Japan Association of Private Universities and Colleges and chairman of Defense Facilities under Ministry of Defense Central Council.
