= Shimo-Shakujii =

Shimo-Shakujii 下石神井
- Neighborhood (町丁)
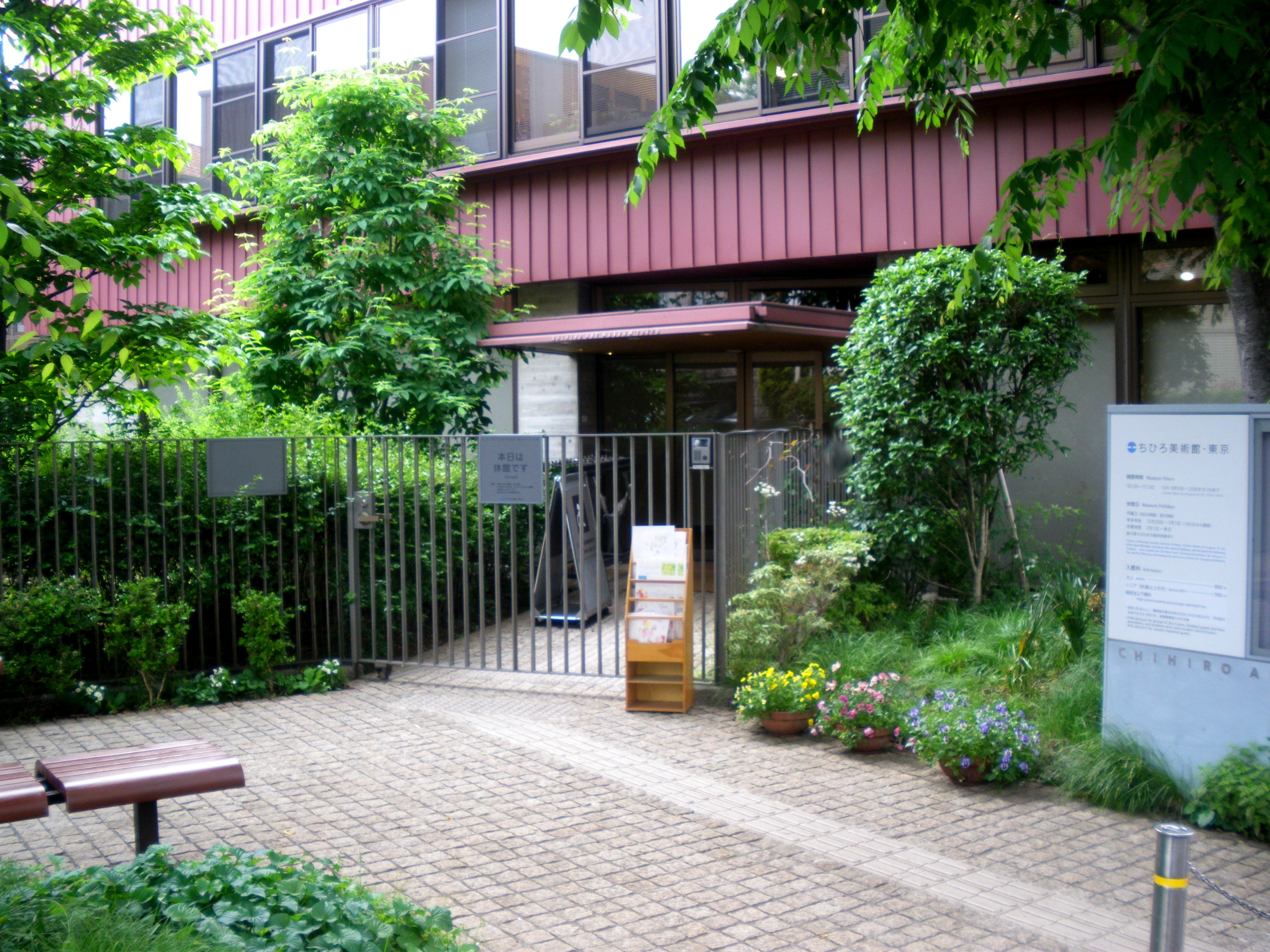
- Chihiro Art Museum Tokyo (2009)

- Location of Shimo-Shakujii within the Wards Area of Tokyo
- Country: Japan
- Region: Kantō
- Metropolis: Tokyo
- Ward: Nerima

Area
  - Total: 1.165 km^{2} (0.450 sq mi)

Population (April 1, 2025)
  - Total: 18,152
- Time zone: UTC+9 (JST)
- Zip code: 177-0042
- Area code: 03

Shimo-Shakujii (下石神井) is a neighborhood of Nerima Ward in Tokyo, Japan. The residential address system has been implemented throughout the area since 1 August 1973. Its current administrative divisions extend from Shimo-Shakujii 1st Street to 6th Street (丁目, chōme).

== Geography ==
Located in the southwestern part of Nerima Ward, Shimo-Shakujii borders the following neighborhoods clockwise starting from the east: Minami-Tanaka (Nerima Ward), Igusa (Suginami Ward), Kami-Igusa (Suginami Ward), Kami-Shakujii-Minamichō (Nerima Ward), Kami-Shakujii (Nerima Ward), and Shakujiimachi (Nerima Ward).

The northern border of the neighborhood aligns with the Shakujii River, the southern border with Senkawa-dōri Avenue, and the western border with Igusa-dōri Avenue.

=== Rivers ===
Shakujii River viewed from Nenehara Bridge (March 2026)

- Shakujii River
- Nukui River (extinct)
- Senkawa Aqueduct

=== Land Values ===
According to official land prices as of January 1, 2025, the residential land value at Shimo-Shakujii 4-34-18 was 603,000 yen per square meter.

== History ==
Shimo-Shakujii originated as Shimo-Shakujii Village in Toshima District, Musashi Province. On May 1, 1889, with the introduction of the municipal system (町村制, chōsonsei), Shimo-Shakujii Village became Ōaza Shimo-Shakujii within Shakujii Village.

On October 1, 1932, upon incorporation into Tokyo City, the area was designated as Shimo-Shakujii 1st and 2nd Streets within Itabashi Ward. At that time, Shimo-Shakujii 1st and 2nd Streets covered a vast area encompassing present-day Shimo-Shakujii 1st to 6th Street, Shakujiimachi 1 to 8th Street, and Kami-Shakujii-Minamichō.

On January 1, 1970, with the implementation of the residential addressing system, the majority of the former Shimo-Shakujii 2nd Street was reclassified as Shakujiimachi 1 to 8th Street. On August 1, 1973, another implementation reorganized most of the former Shimo-Shakujii 1st Street alongside parts of Minamitanakachō, creating the present-day Shimo-Shakujii 1st to 6th Streets. The old and new Shimo-Shakujii 1st Street designations coexisted until June 1, 1984, when the remaining portion of the former Shimo-Shakujii 1st Street was renamed Kami-Shakujii-Minamichō.

== Transportation ==
=== Railways ===
There are no railway stations located directly within the neighborhood.

Adjacent Railway Stations	Accessible Stations (via Bus, etc.)
Seibu Ikebukuro Line: Shakujii-kōen Station (SI 10) (Shakujiimachi 3rd Street, Nerima); Seibu Shinjuku Line: Iogi Station (SS 11) (Shimo-Igusa 5th Street, Suginami); Kami-Igusa Station (SS 12) (Kami-Igusa 3rd Street, Suginami); Kami-Shakujii Station (SS 13) (Kami-Shakujii 1st Street, Nerima)	Seibu Ikebukuro Line: Ōizumi-gakuen Station (SI 11) (Higashi-Ōizumi 1st Street, Nerima); Seibu Shinjuku Line: Shimo-Igusa Station (SS 10) (Shimo-Igusa 2nd Street, Suginami); JRChūō Line (Rapid); JRChūō-Sōbu Line; Tokyo Metro Marunouchi Line: Ogikubo Station (JC 09)(JB 04)(M 01) (Kami-Ogi 1st Street / Ogikubo 5th Street, Suginami); JRChūō Line (Rapid); JRChūō-Sōbu Line: Asagaya Station (JC 08)(JB 05) (Asagaya-Minami 3rd Street, Suginami); Tokyo Metro Marunouchi Line: Minami-Asagaya Station (M 02) (Asagaya-Minami 1st Street, Suginami)

=== Bus ===
- Seibu Bus (Nerima Depot) operates route buses in the surrounding area.
- Seibu Bus (Kami-Shakujii Depot) operates route buses in the surrounding area.
- Kanto Bus (Asagaya Depot) operates route buses in the surrounding area.
- Frequent bus services connect the neighborhood with Shakujii-kōen Station and Ogikubo Station. Bus routes wrap around the district, operating along Igusa-dōri Avenue via Kami-Igusa Station to the west and Waseda-dōri Avenue via Iogi Station to the east.
- When traveling toward Ogikubo Station via Kami-Igusa Station, some commuters walk to the bus stop on the south side of Kami-Igusa Station to avoid railroad crossing traffic delays.
- Bicycle commuting directly to Chūō Line stations such as Ogikubo Station is also common among local residents.

=== Roads ===
- Tokyo Metropolitan Route 439 (Shiinamachi Kami-Shakujii Line, Senkawa-dōri Avenue)
- Tokyo Metropolitan Route 245 (Suginami Tanashi Line, Shin-Ōme Kaidō Avenue)
- Tokyo Metropolitan Route 444 (Shimo-Shakujii Ōizumi Line, Igusa-dōri Avenue)
- Tokyo Metropolitan and Saitama Prefecture Route 25 (Iidabashi Shakujii Niiza Line, Kyū-Waseda-dōri Avenue)
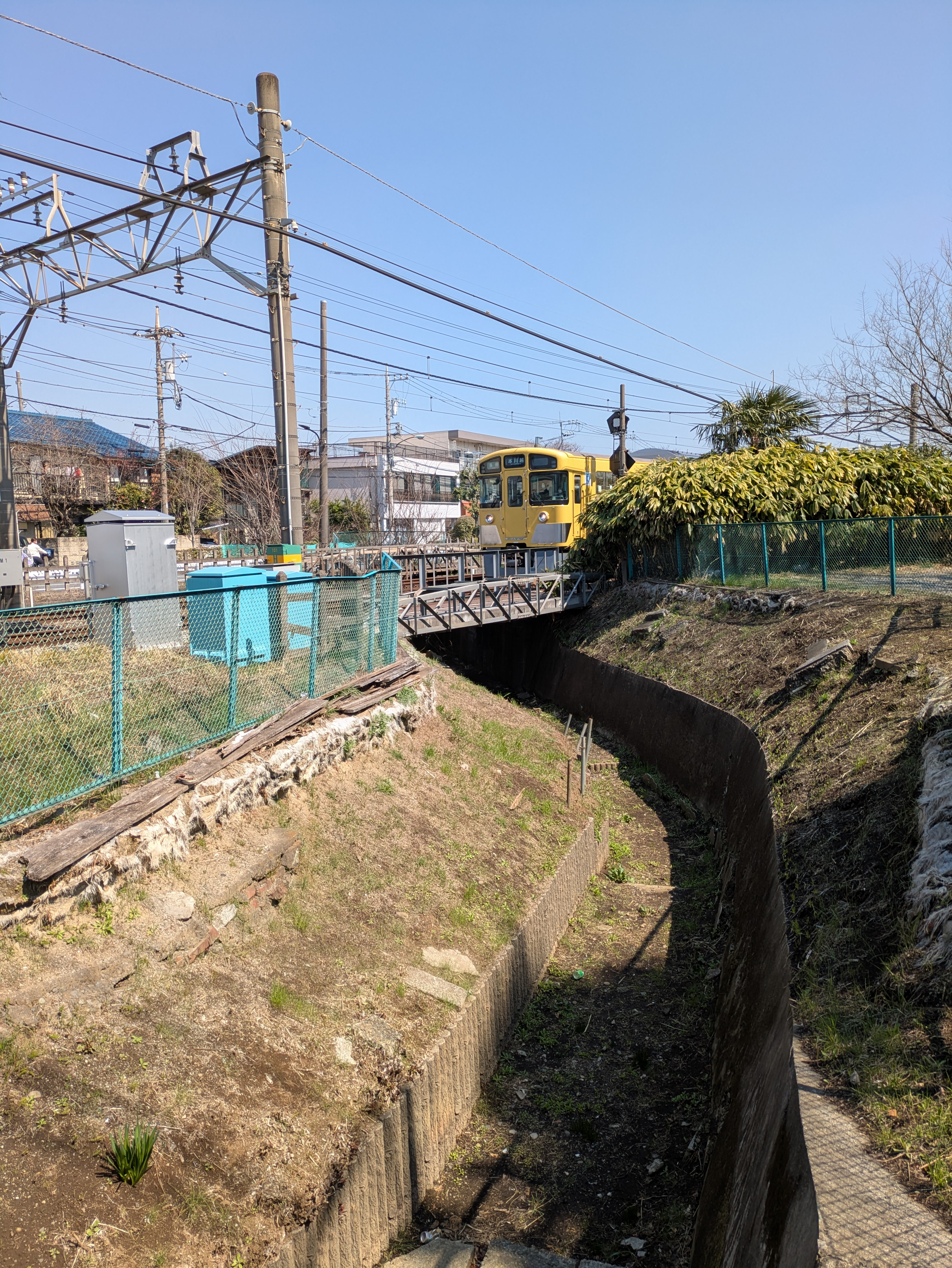
Senkawa Aqueduct at the Seibu Shinjuku Line crossing (March 2025)

Igusa 4th Street traffic light (October 2025)

Igusa-dōri bus stop (August 2025)

== Facilities ==
=== Shimo-Shakujii 4th Street ===
- Chihiro Art Museum Tokyo, established in 1977 at the site of artist Chihiro Iwasaki's former home and studio.
- Shimo-Shakujii Mitake Shrine (下石神井御嶽神社), established during the Bunka–Bunsei eras (1804–1829), dedicated to Mount Kiso-Ontake worship.

=== Shimo-Shakujii 5th Street ===
- Shakujii Fire Station, Tokyo Fire Department
Mitake Shrine (August 2025)

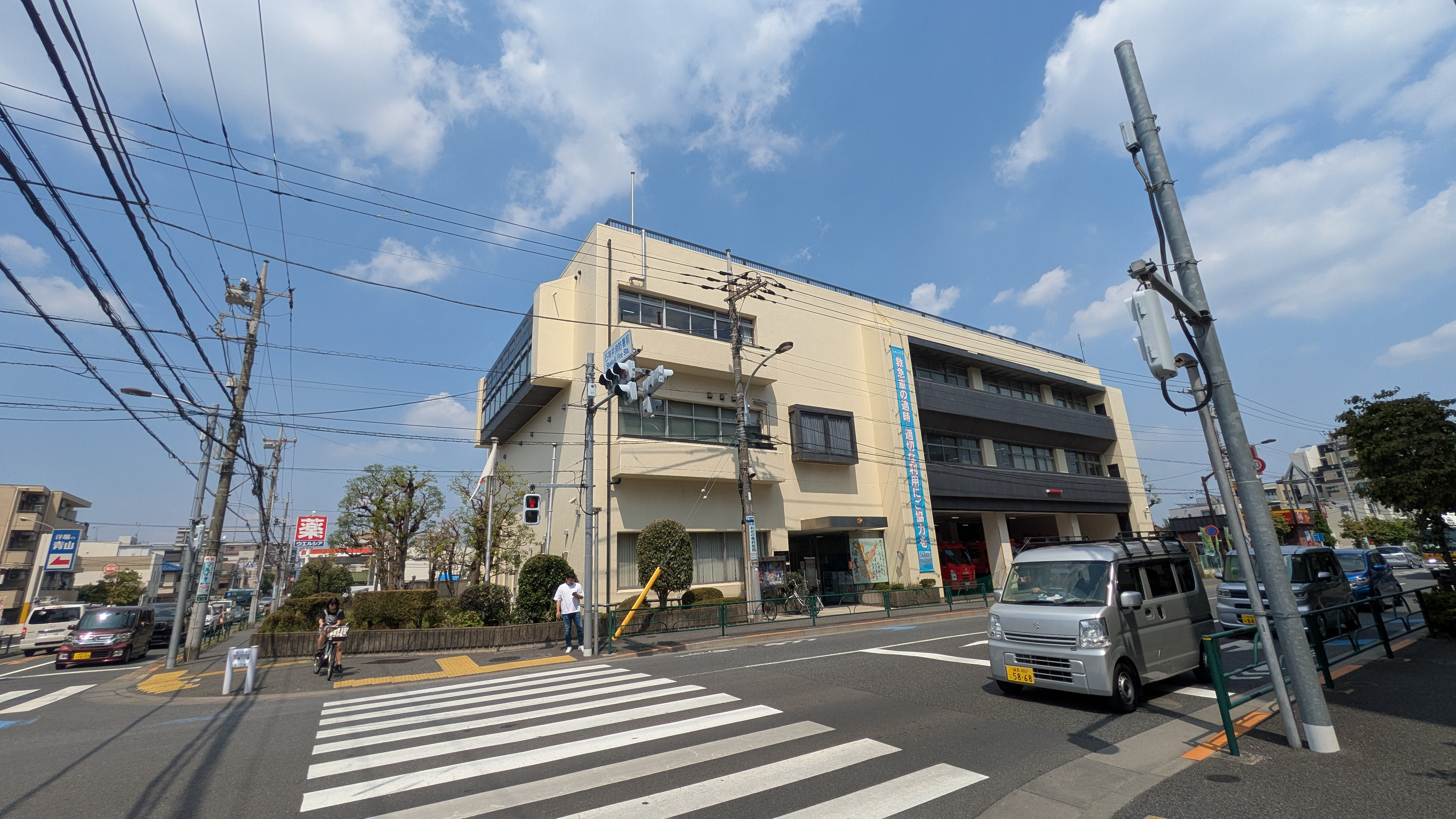
Shakujii Fire Station (August 2025)

== Postal Code ==
The postal code for Shimo-Shakujii is 177-0042 (Served by the Shakujii Post Office).
