= Tokyo Junior College of Nurtures =

Tokyo Junior College of Nurtures (東京保育専門学校, Tōkyō Hoiku Senmon Gakkō) is a private vocational school in the city of Suginami, Tokyo Japan. The school opened in 1924 and has admitted only female students.
