= Ogikubo, Tokyo =

Town in Suginami ward, Tokyo

Coordinates: 35°42′00″N 139°37′20″E

Ogikubo (Japanese: 荻窪) is a suburban, residential area of Tokyo in Suginami ward, approximately 8 km west of Shinjuku. Ogikubo has the Ogikubo Station on the JR Chūō Line (Rapid), the JR Chūō-Sōbu Line, the Tokyo Metro Marunouchi Line (terminus) and the Tokyo Metro Tōzai Line extension (which runs on the Chūō-Sōbu Line tracks). The Japanese headquarters of American Express is located near the station.

== Households and Population ==
The number of households and population as of March 1, 2024 (announced by Suginami Ward) are as follows..

chome	Number of households	Population
Ogikubo 1-chome	2,613 households	5,388 people
Ogikubo 2-chome	2,184 households	4,007 people
Ogikubo 3-chome	3,687 households	7,024 people
Ogikubo 4-chome	2,702 households	4,331 people
Ogikubo 5-chome	3,114 households	4,859 people
total	14,300 households	25,609 people

== Shopping ==
The area's main shopping area mostly consists of three connected department stores; Seiyu, Town Seven and Lumine. Seiyu is a low-price department store owned by Wal-Mart Stores, Inc. selling food, clothes, home goods, etc. There are also various types of stores and restaurants in the area surrounding the train station.

== Relationship with Ramen ==
Ogikubo is commonly referred to as the birthplace of Tokyo ramen. More specifically, Ogikubo ramen is known for ramen cooked with fish bones instead of pork bones. Exiting from the North side of the station (Kitaguchi) and heading towards the Amanuma neighborhood one comes across many of the famous Ogikubo-ramen-tens. Two busy main roads, Kanpachi-dori and Ōme-kaido, run through Ogikubo and cross at four corners called Shimendō (四面道) which is actually where Kamiogi Ichome (上荻一丁目), Kamiogi Nichōme (上荻二丁目), Shimizu Ichōme (清水一丁目), Momoi Ichōme (桃井一丁目) come together. This is to the northwest of Ogikubo and Ogikubo Station.

== Name ==
"Ogi" (荻) is the name of a kind of reed in Japanese, and "kubo" (窪) means "hollow".
