= Satoko Kishimoto =

Japanese politician (born 1974)

- 岸本 聡子
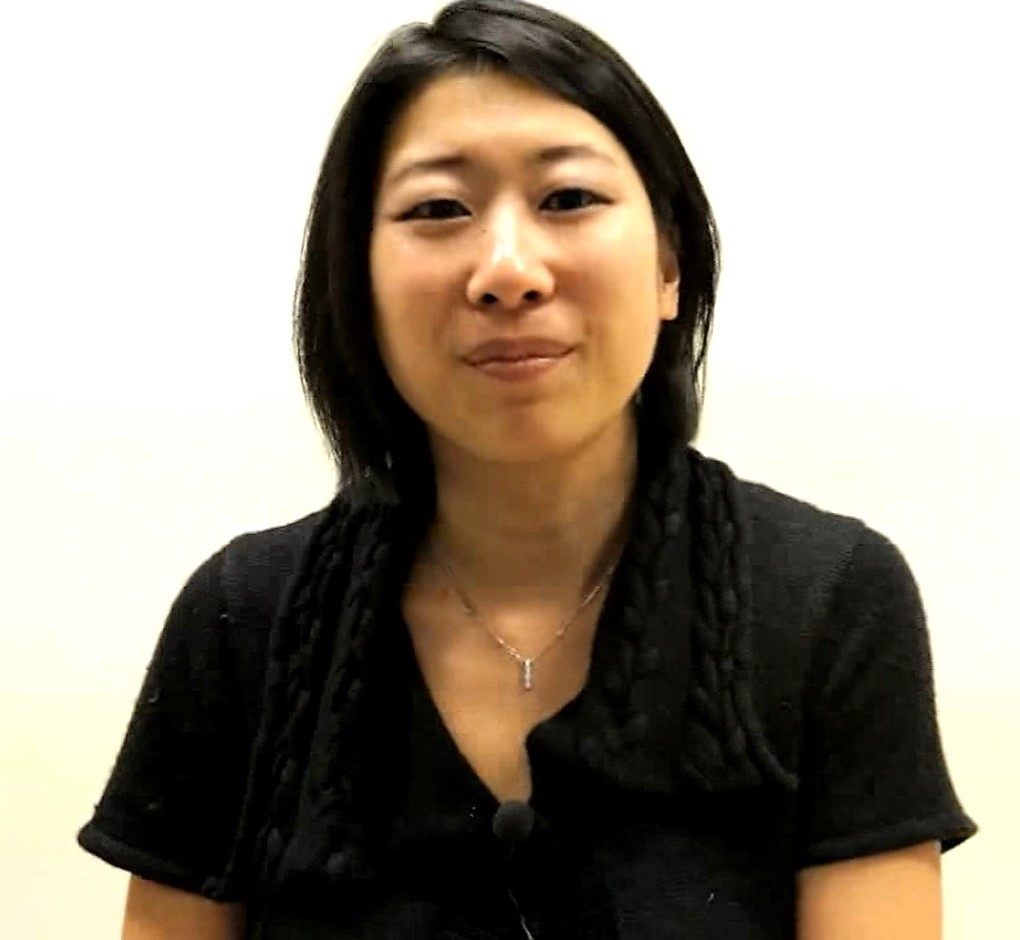
- Kishimoto speaks to the Forum alternatif mondial de l'eau in 2012

Mayor of Suginami
- Incumbent
- Assumed office 11 July 2022
- Preceded by: Ryō Tanaka

Personal details
- Born: 15 July 1974 (age 52) Ōta, Tokyo, Japan
- Party: Independent
- Children: 2
- Education: Nihon University
- Website: www.kishimotosatoko.net/english

Satoko Kishimoto (Japanese: 岸本聡子; born 15 July 1974) is a Japanese politician and book editor. She is the first female mayor of Suginami, Tokyo.

Kishimoto spent some of her adult life in Europe before returning to Japan and entering politics unaffiliated with any political party. She is the editor of an anti-water privatisation book.

== Early life ==
Kishimoto was born on 15 July 1974. She grew up in Japan, before moving to the Netherlands aged 25, then moving to Leuven, Belgium in 2008.

== Career ==
Kishimoto became interested in Japanese politics while working at the Transnational Institute, a non-profit organisation in Amsterdam, and attracted a grass-roots following with online debates during the COVID-19 pandemic. She was unsure of moving back to Japan permanently as she felt it would disrupt her children's schooling, but agreed to do so in April 2022 in order to campaign for mayor.

In May 2022, while campaigning, Kishimoto took part in an anti-gentrification march in Koenji.

Kishimoto was elected in June 2022 as an independent candidate, defeating the incumbent conservative mayor by 187 votes. She became Suginami's first female elected mayor.

== Views ==
Kishimoto has voiced concern about the lack of gender diversity in Japanese politics, believing it to be a serious detriment to the country. Of the 23 elected mayors in Tokyo, only three are women. She has faced criticism from some male subordinates over her gender, her lack of established political experience, and for living outside Japan for several years. She has spoken out against verbal and physical harassment by men. Along with other female Japanese politicians, she started the website Harassment Consultation Centre for Women in Politics.

Kishimoto has opposed roadbuilding projects in Koenji. She is against privatisation and has edited a book outlining alternatives to water privatisation.

== Personal life ==
Kishimoto is married and has two children.
