= Suginami Animation Museum =

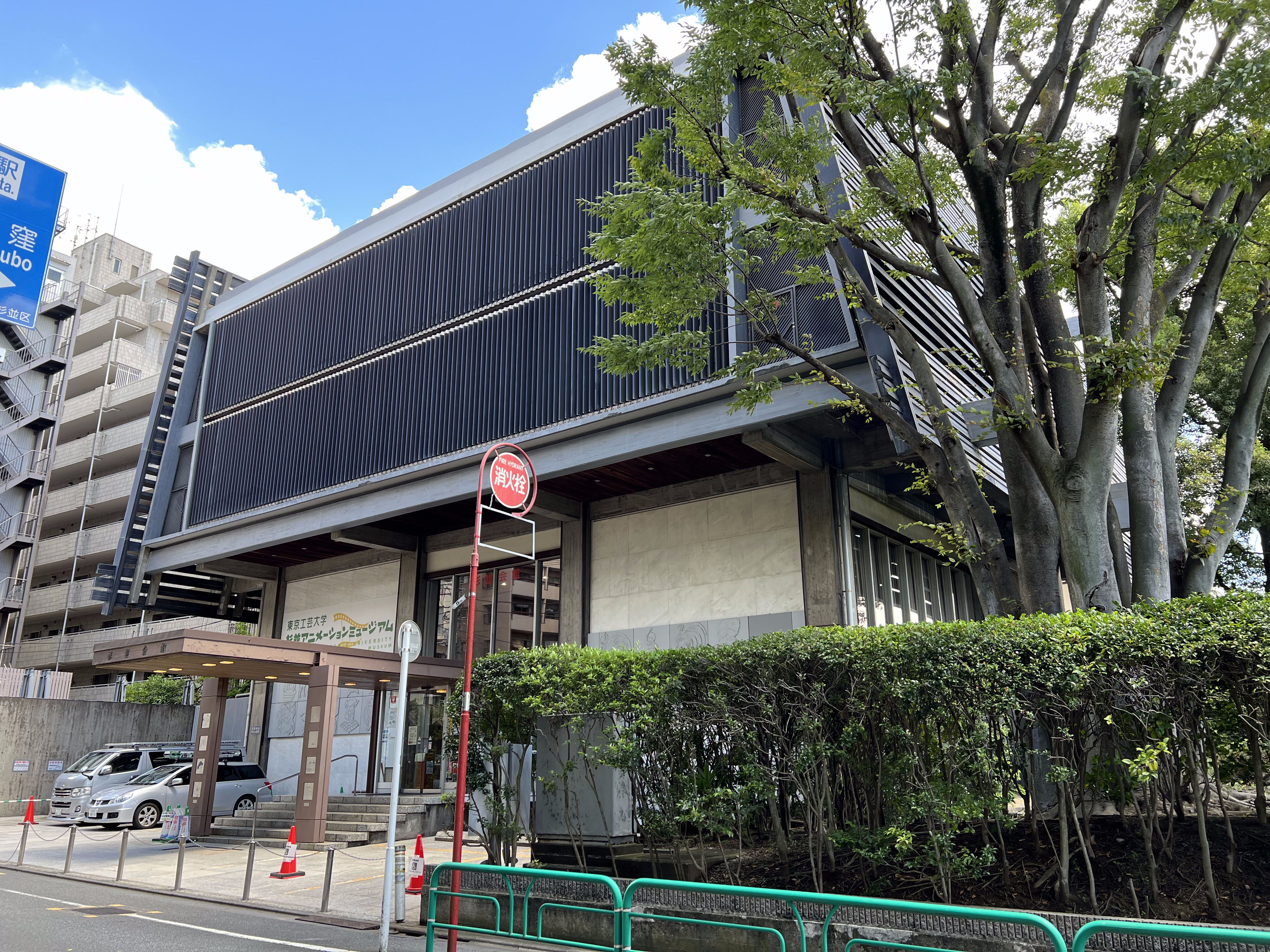

- Location within Special wards of Tokyo
- Established: March 5, 2005
- Location: Suginami Animation Museum, Tokyo, JP
- Coordinates: 35°42′37.6″N 139°36′28″E
- Type: Art museum
- Website: sam.or.jp

Suginami Animation Museum is an animation museum in the Kamiogi, Suginami Ward of Tokyo. Operation is overseen by the general incorporated association, The Association of Japanese Animations. Depending on public naming rights, the museum has been named "Tokyo Polytechnic University Suginami Animation Museum" since September 2018.

== Overview ==
Originally opening as a Suginami Ward facility since May 2003, Suginami Animation Museum expanded, and was renamed and reopened on March 5, 2005. As for the museum, unlike the Ghibli Museum in Mikata, Tokyo, the Suginami Animation Museum is not a specific author's museum, but rather a museum that serves as a target of animation as a whole, the first of its kind in Japan. Suginami Ward founded the museum as a local industry establishment to aid in anime recollection.

Regarding the exhibition of animation's history, production process, and such, the library's possession has performed animated works' screening somewhere else; anime's dubbing, sound effects, and the like.

Likewise, in the event of famous mangaka and animation writers' passing away, mourning exhibits and the like are also held. For example, in the past Toshiko Ueda and Hiroshi Ōsaka's mourning exhibits were held at the museum.

On April 1, 2021, Rikio Kichida assumed the office of superintendent. The former superintendent was animation writer Shinichi Suzuki. As for Suzuki's predecessor, he was introduced in the manga writing duo Fujiko Fujio's famous work, Koike-san. From his experience in the business world, Kichida is involved as a production assistant and producer of Tokyo Movie (afterwards referred to as TMS Entertainment) thanks to numerous acquaintances; he has also worked for the industry group's director.

Admission to the museum is free, but in 2018 the Suginami Ward's naming rights were opened up by looking for previous supporters. The Ward's prospective contract sum was five million yen per year, and the period was three to five years. Around the time that "Suginami Animation Museum" was left behind, the sponsor name and such were included conditions, and anime production companies were not subjected. The consequences of public appeal were that Tokyo Polytechnic University obtained the naming rights contract period, lasting five years (from 2018 to 2023). Expiration happened from August 2023 onwards, and afterwards Tokyo Polytechnic University's name was crowned during business performing; the contract period is believed to be renewing and lengthening.
