= Harassment Consultation Centre for Women in Politics =

Japanese website

- Website type: Not-for-profit
- Available in: Japanese
- Founded: 2023
- Services: Gender equity
- Revenue: 0
- Employees: 0
- Website: soudan-politician.studio.site
- Commercial: No

The Harassment Consultation Centre for Women in Politics (Japanese: 女性議員のハラスメント相談センター) is a Japanese website created to support women politicians running for office.

The website is Japan's first web-based platform that enables aspiring female politicians to collaborate against gender discrimination.

The website is run by volunteers, including politician 濵田真里共同 and Mari Hamada.

== See also ==
- Satoko Kishimoto
