= Shimo-Igusa Station =

Railway station in Tokyo, Japan

Coordinates: 35.7240°N 139.6246°E

SS10 Shimo-Igusa Station 下井草駅
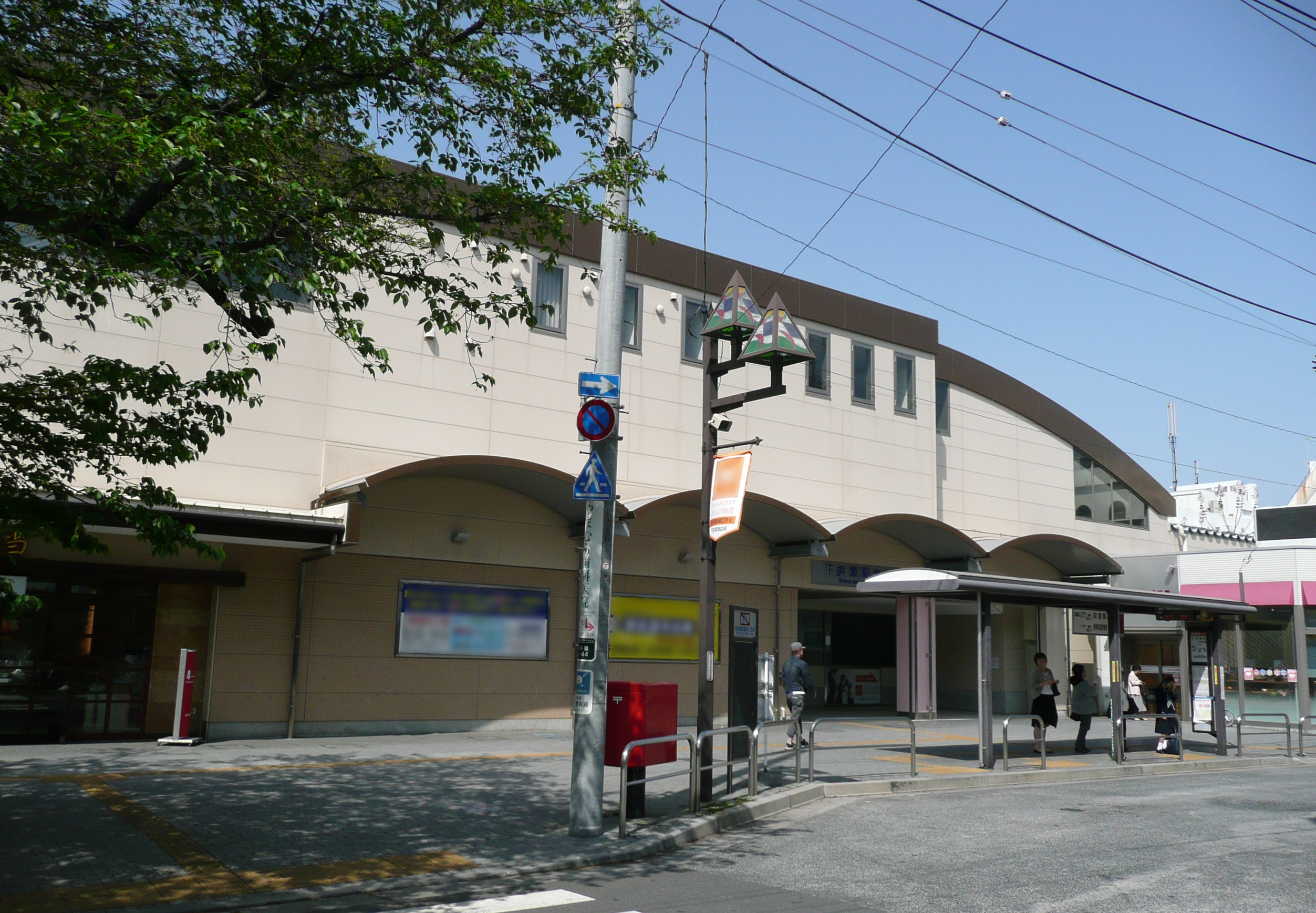
- The south entrance in April 2012

General information
- Location: Suginami, Tokyo; Japan
- Operator: Seibu Railway
- Line: Seibu Shinjuku Line

Other information
- Station code: SS10

History
- Opened: 16 April 1927

Passengers
- FY2013: 23,764 daily

Services
Preceding station	Seibu Railway	Following station
Iogi SS11 towards Hon-Kawagoe	Shinjuku Line Local	Saginomiya SS09 towards Seibu-Shinjuku
Location
- Location within Tokyo Location within Japan

Shimo-Igusa Station (下井草駅, Shimo-Igusa-eki) is a railway station on the Seibu Shinjuku Line in Suginami, Tokyo, Japan, operated by the private railway operator Seibu Railway.

== Lines ==
Shimo-Igusa Station Station is served by the 47.5 km Seibu Shinjuku Line from Seibu-Shinjuku in Tokyo to Hon-Kawagoe in Saitama Prefecture, with some through services to and from Haijima on the Seibu Haijima Line.

== Station layout ==
The station consists of two ground-level side platforms serving two tracks.

=== Platforms ===
1	Seibu Shinjuku Line	for Tanashi, Tokorozawa, Haijima, and Hon-Kawagoe
2	Seibu Shinjuku Line	for Takadanobaba and Seibu-Shinjuku

== History ==
Shimo-Igusa Station opened on 16 April 1927. Station numbering was introduced on all Seibu Railway lines during fiscal 2012, with Shimo-Igusa Station becoming "SS10".

== Passenger statistics ==
In fiscal 2013, the station was the 45th busiest on the Seibu network with an average of 23,764 passengers daily.

The passenger figures for previous years are as shown below.

Fiscal year	Daily average
2009	24,228
2010	23,516
2011	23,039
2012	23,388
2013	23,764
