= Minami-asagaya Station =

Metro station in Tokyo, Japan

Coordinates: 35.699412°N 139.635603°E

Minami-asagaya Station 南阿佐ケ谷駅

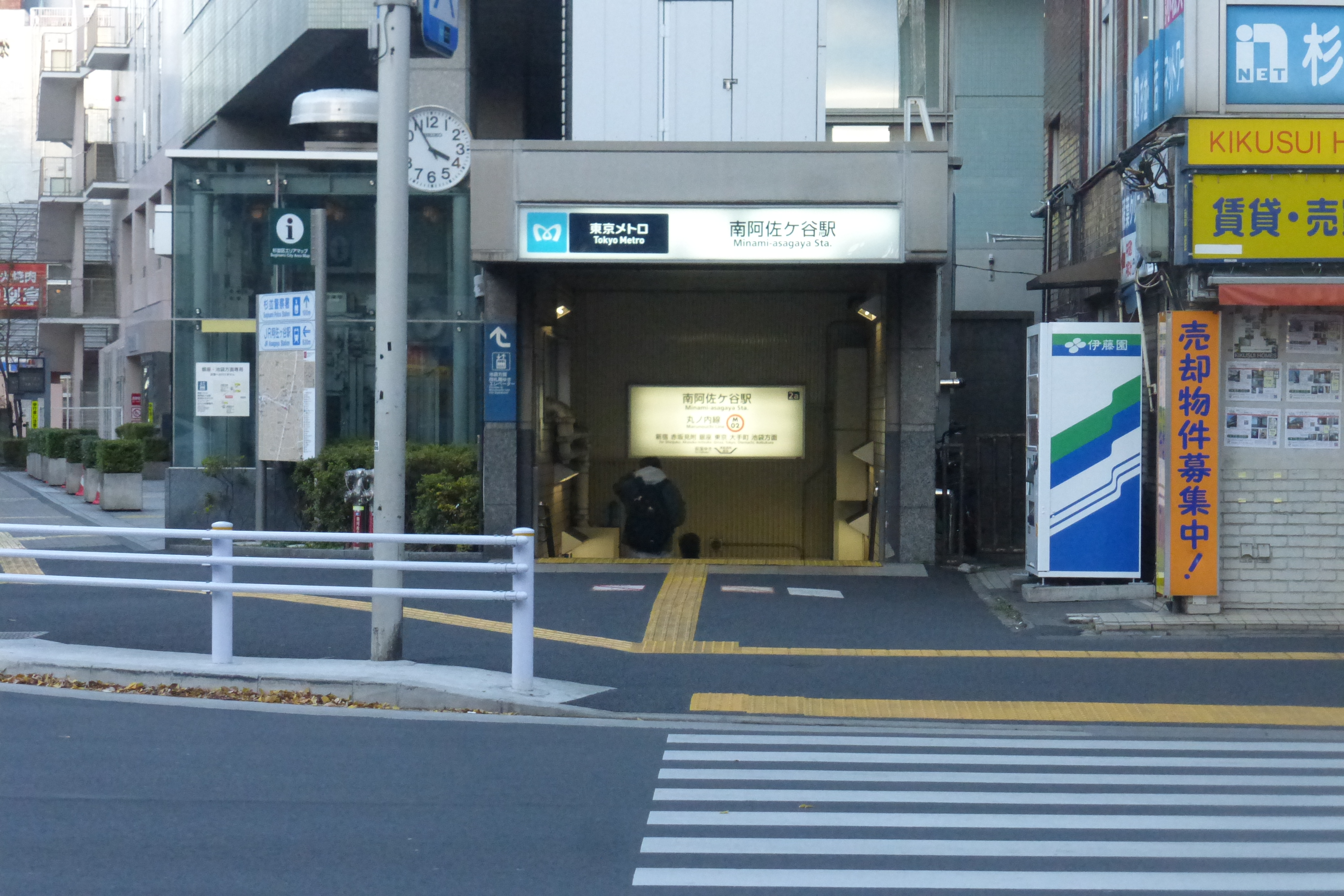
- Entrance 2a, December 2016

General information
- Location: 1-15-7 Asagaya-minami, Suginami, Tokyo （東京都杉並区阿佐谷南1-15-7） Japan
- Operator: Tokyo Metro
- Line: Marunouchi Line
- Platforms: 2 side platforms
- Tracks: 2
- Connections: Bus stop

Construction
- Structure type: Underground

Other information
- Station code: M-02

History
- Opened: 1 November 1961; 65 years ago

Passengers
- FY2011: 21,611 daily

Services
Preceding station	Tokyo Metro	Following station
Ogikubo Terminus	Marunouchi Line	Shin-kōenji towards Ikebukuro
Location
- Location within Special wards of Tokyo Location within Tokyo Bay and Bōsō Peninsula Location within Tokyo Location within Japan

Minami-asagaya Station (南阿佐ケ谷駅, Minami-asagaya-eki) is a subway station on the Tokyo Metro Marunouchi Line in Suginami, Tokyo, Japan, operated by the Tokyo subway operator Tokyo Metro. It is numbered M-02.

== Lines ==
Minami-asagaya Station is served by the Marunouchi Line from Ogikubo to Ikebukuro, and is 22.7 km from the eastern terminus of the Line at Ikebukuro.

== Station layout ==
The station consists of two underground side platforms serving two tracks on the first basement level. The platforms are served by their own sets of ticket barriers, with access to the surface from Exits 1 and 2 (from platforms 1 and 2 respectively). The two platforms are also linked by an underground passageway.

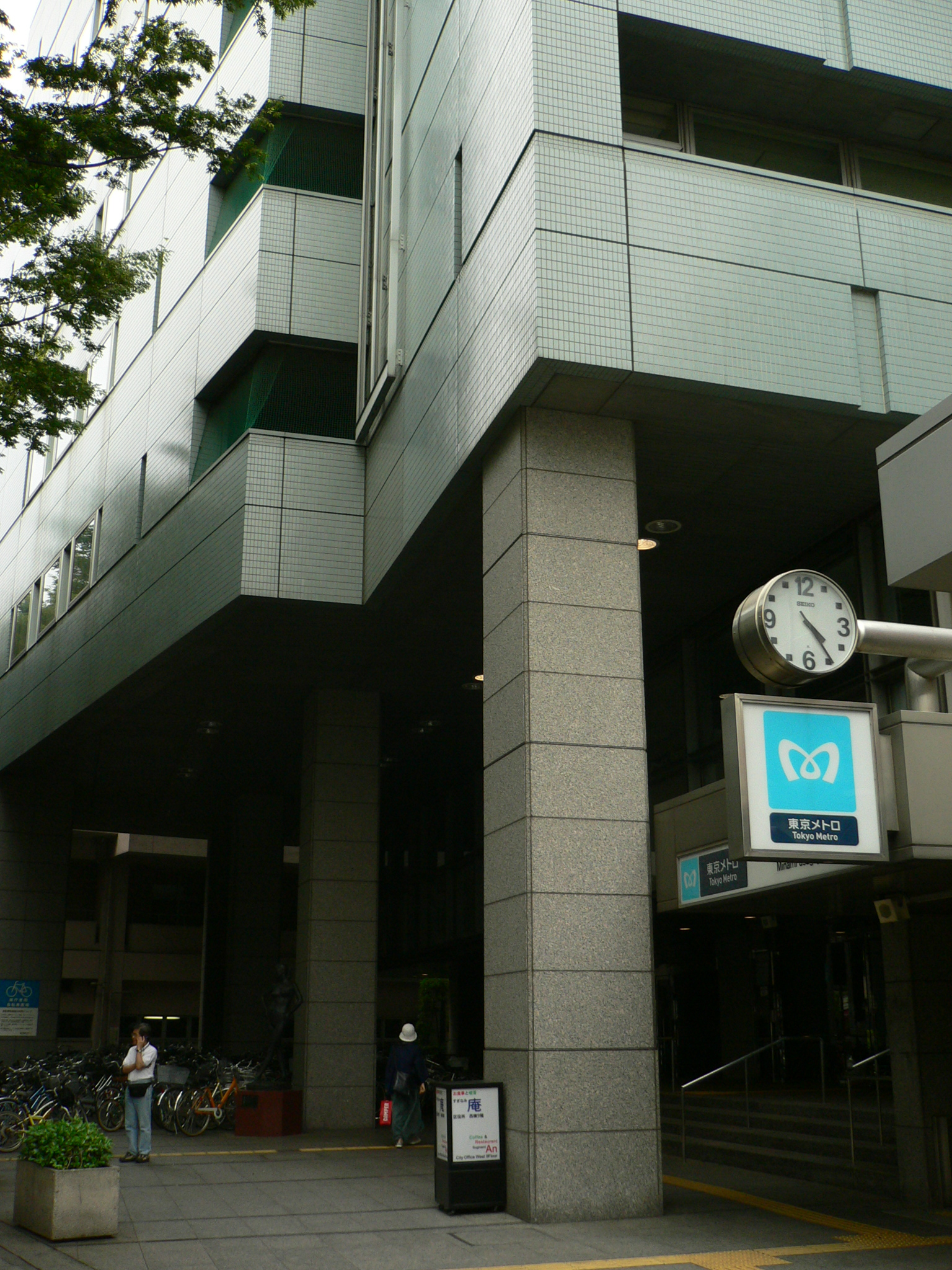
Entrance 2b, June 2005

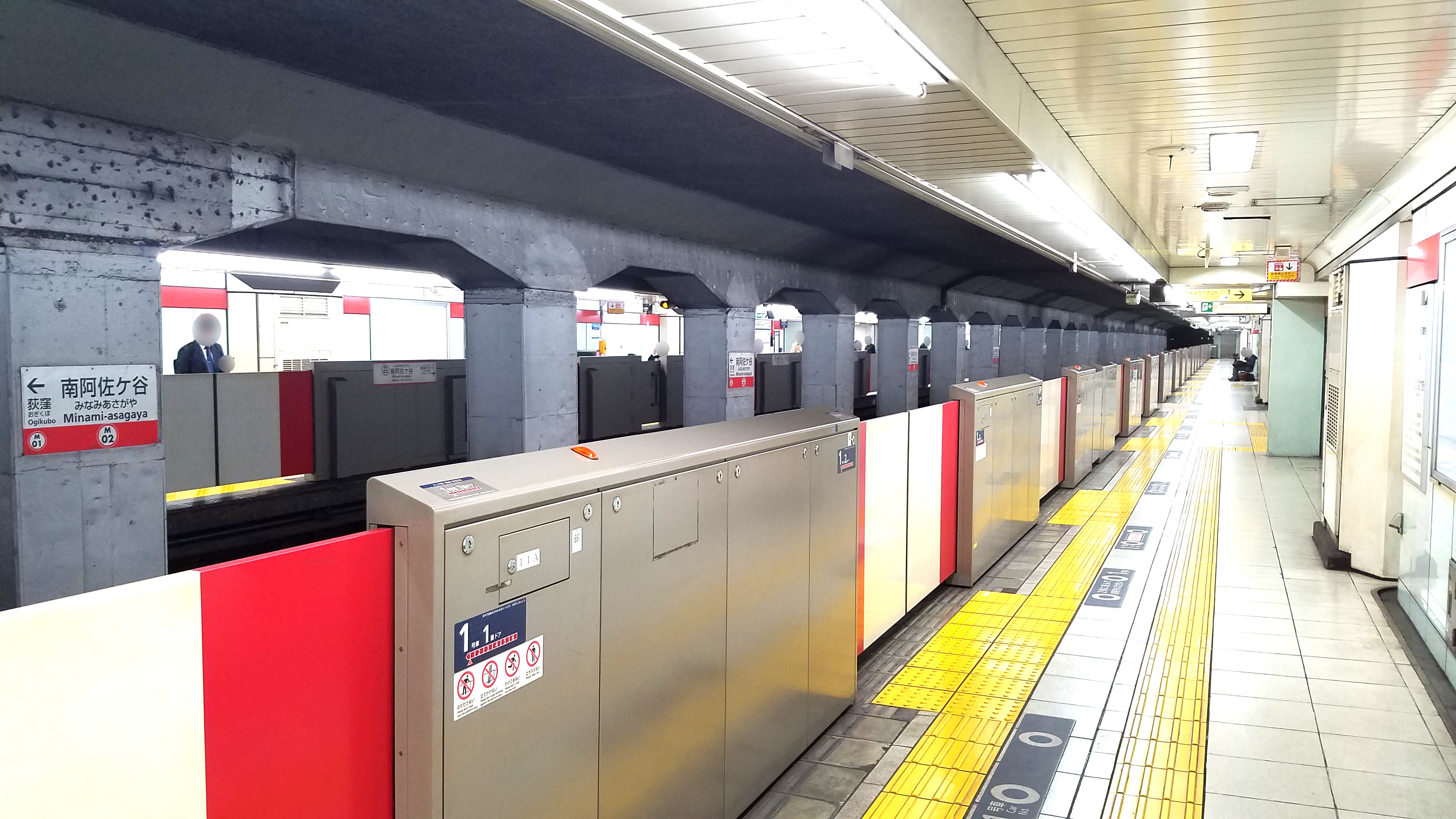
The platforms, March 2022

=== Platforms ===
1	Marunouchi Line	for Ogikubo
2	Marunouchi Line	for Shinjuku, Ginza, and Ikebukuro

== History ==
Minami-asagaya Station opened on 1 November 1961.

The station facilities were inherited by Tokyo Metro after the privatization of the Teito Rapid Transit Authority (TRTA) in 2004.

== Passenger statistics ==
In fiscal 2011, the station was used by an average of 21,611 passengers daily.

== Surrounding area ==
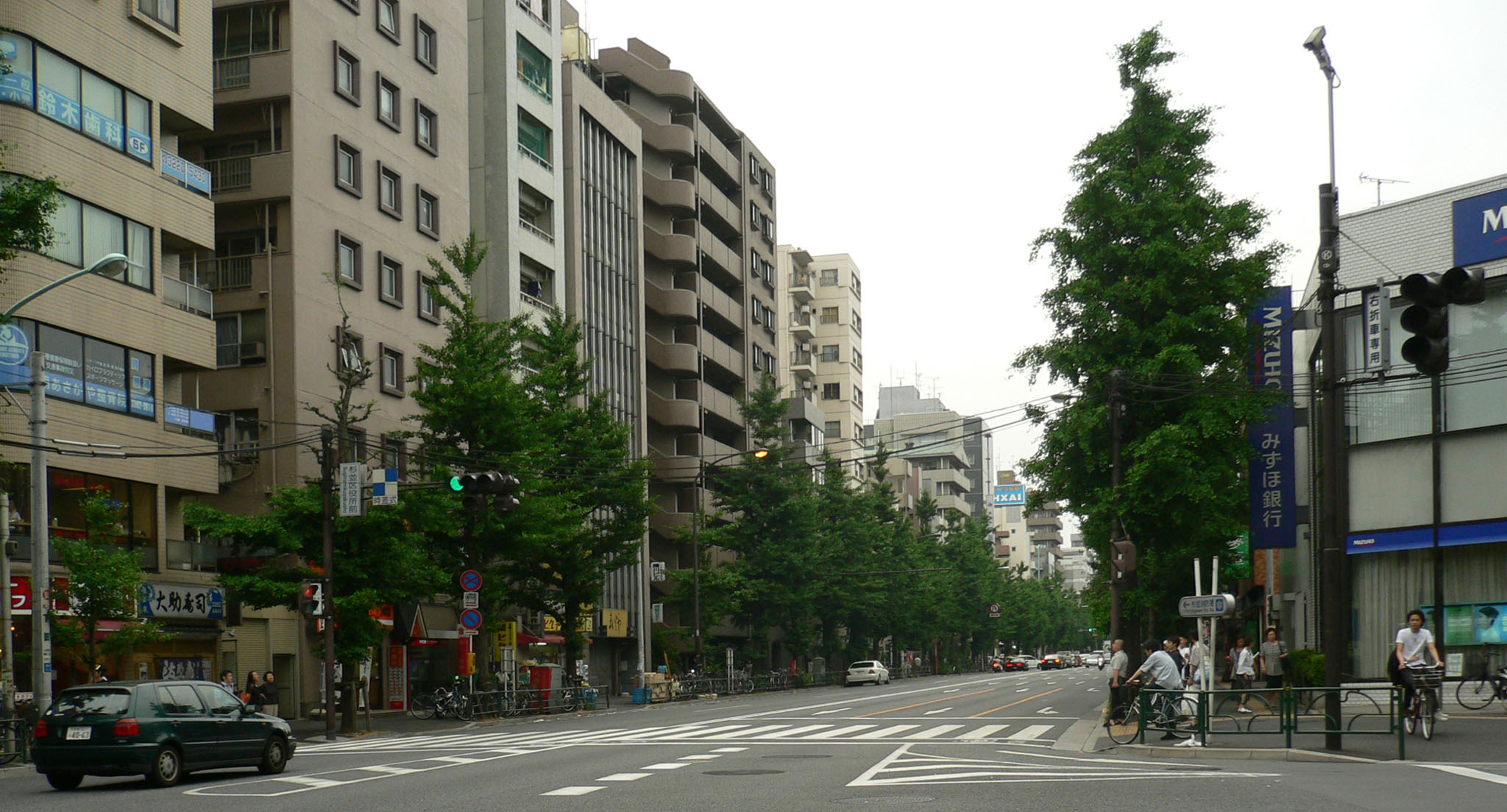
The street above Minami-asagaya Station, June 2005

- Suginami Ward Office
- Suginami Police Station
- Suginami Fire Station
- Suginami Tax Office
- Asagaya Shinmeigu Shrine
- Suginami Higashita Elementary School
