= Iogi Station =

Railway station in Tokyo, Japan

Coordinates: 35.7249°N 139.6152°E

SS11 Iogi Station 井荻駅
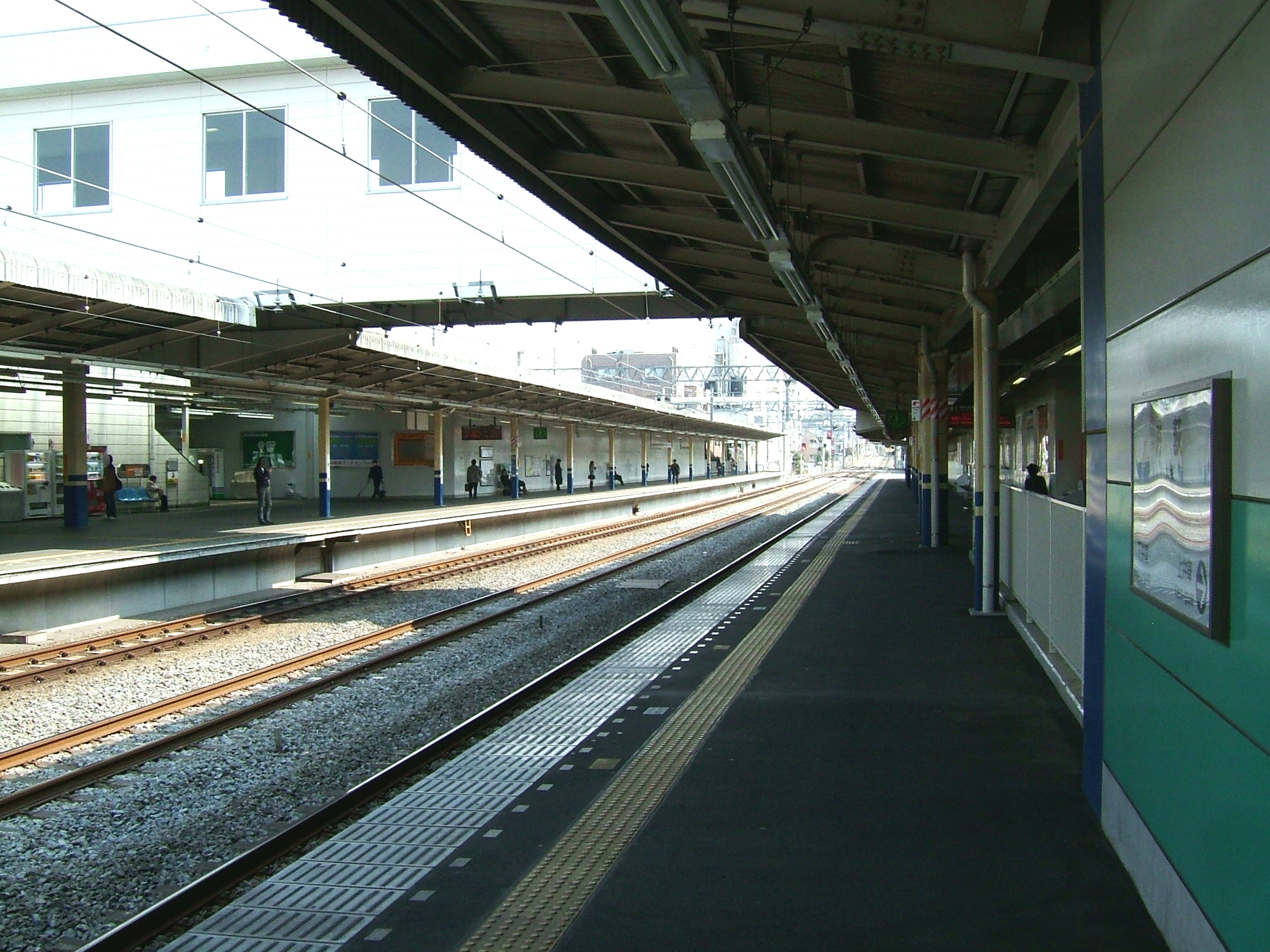
- Platforms, March 2008

General information
- Location: Suginami, Tokyo, Tokyo; Japan
- Operator: Seibu Railway
- Line: Seibu Shinjuku Line
- Platforms: 2 side platforms
- Tracks: 3

Other information
- Station code: SS11

History
- Opened: 16 April 1927

Passengers
- FY2013: 19,863 daily

Services
Preceding station	Seibu Railway	Following station
Kami-Igusa SS12 towards Hon-Kawagoe	Shinjuku Line Local	Shimo-Igusa SS10 towards Seibu-Shinjuku
Location

Iogi Station (井荻駅, Iogi-eki) is a railway station on the Seibu Shinjuku Line in Suginami, Tokyo, Japan, operated by the private railway operator Seibu Railway.

== Lines ==
Iogi Station Station is served by the 47.5 km Seibu Shinjuku Line from Seibu-Shinjuku in Tokyo to Hon-Kawagoe in Saitama Prefecture.

== Station layout ==
The station consists of two ground-level side platforms serving two tracks. A third track sits between the two tracks, allowing express trains to pass stopped local trains.

=== Platforms ===
1	Seibu Shinjuku Line	for Tanashi, Tokorozawa, Haijima, and Hon-Kawagoe
2	Seibu Shinjuku Line	for Takadanobaba and Seibu-Shinjuku

== History ==
Iogi Station opened on 16 April 1927. Station numbering was introduced on all Seibu Railway lines during fiscal 2012, with Iogi Station becoming "SS11".

== Passenger statistics ==
In fiscal 2013, the station was the 52nd busiest on the Seibu network with an average of 19,863 passengers daily.

The passenger figures for previous years are as shown below.

Fiscal year	Daily average
2009	20,080
2010	19,602
2011	19,176
2012	19,456
2013	19,863
