= Kami-Igusa Station =

Railway station in Tokyo, Japan

Coordinates: 35.7251°N 139.6031°E

SS12 Kami-Igusa Station 上井草駅
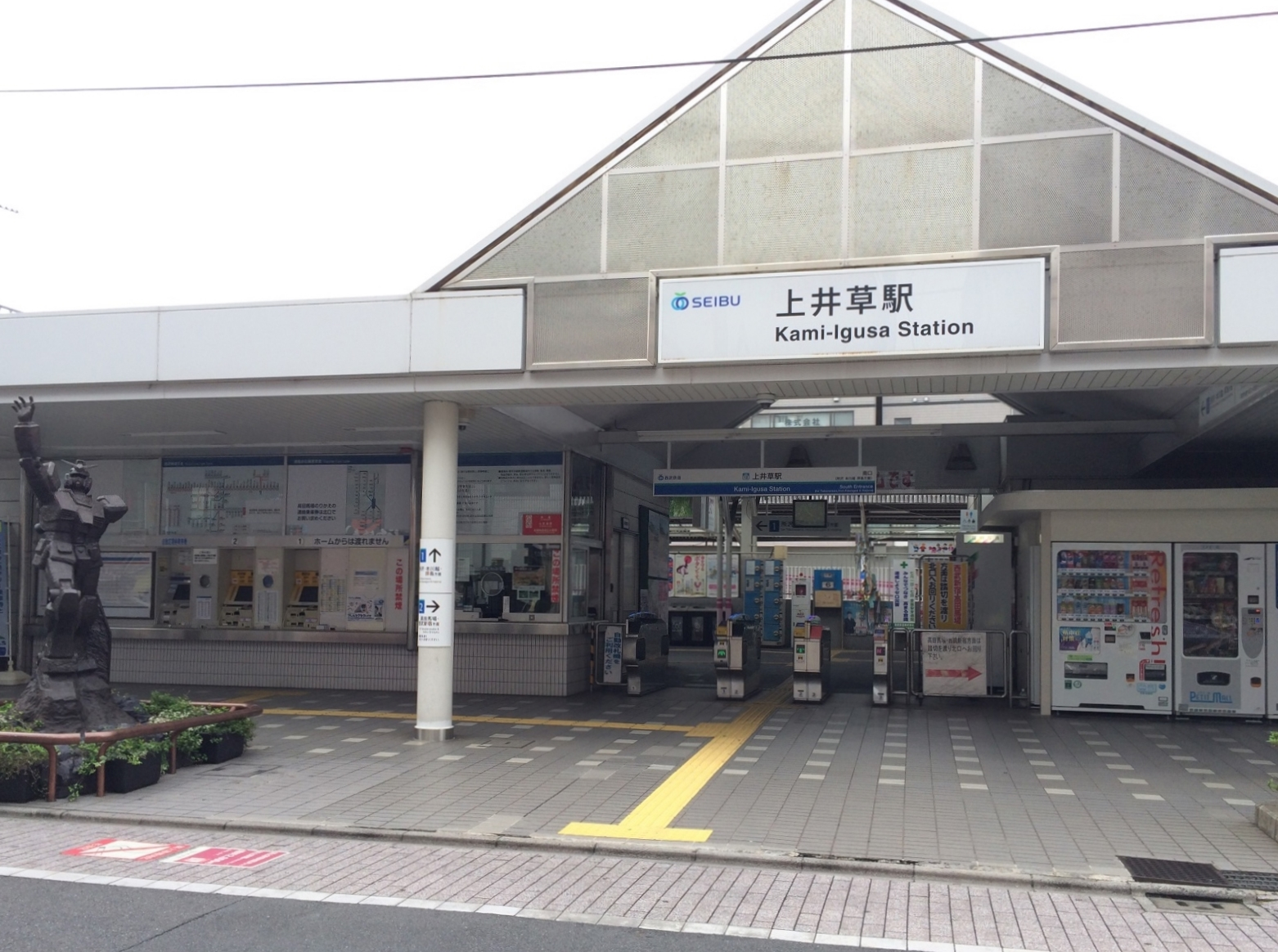
- The south entrance in July 2014

General information
- Location: Suginami, Tokyo; Japan
- Operator: Seibu Railway
- Line: Seibu Shinjuku Line

Other information
- Station code: SS12

History
- Opened: 16 April 1927

Passengers
- FY2013: 20,030 daily

Services
Preceding station	Seibu Railway	Following station
Kami-Shakujii SS13 towards Hon-Kawagoe	Shinjuku Line Local	Iogi SS11 towards Seibu-Shinjuku
Location

Kami-Igusa Station (上井草駅, Kami-Igusa-eki) is a railway station on the Seibu Shinjuku Line in Suginami, Tokyo, Japan, operated by the private railway operator Seibu Railway.

== Lines ==
Kami-Igusa Station is served by the 47.5 km Seibu Shinjuku Line from Seibu-Shinjuku in Tokyo to Hon-Kawagoe in Saitama Prefecture.

== Station layout ==
The station consists of two ground-level side platforms serving two tracks.

=== Platforms ===
1	Seibu Shinjuku Line	for Tanashi, Tokorozawa, Haijima, and Hon-Kawagoe
2	Seibu Shinjuku Line	for Takadanobaba and Seibu-Shinjuku

== History ==
Kami-Igusa Station opened on 16 April 1927. Station numbering was introduced on all Seibu Railway lines during fiscal 2012, with Kami-Igusa Station becoming "SS12".

On 23 March 2008, a bronze statue of the RX-78-2 Gundam was erected at the south entrance of the station to honor the animation studio Sunrise, which is located in Suginami. In addition, the station started using a keyboard rendition of the Mobile Suit Gundam theme song as its train melody.

== Passenger statistics ==
In fiscal 2013, the station was the 51st busiest on the Seibu network with an average of 20,030 passengers daily. The passenger figures for previous years are as shown below.

Fiscal year	Daily average
2009	20,694
2010	19,944
2011	19,740
2012	19,707
2013	20,030

== See also ==
- List of railway stations in Japan
