= Ogikubo Station =

Railway and metro station in Tokyo, Japan

Coordinates: 35°42′17″N 139°37′12″E

Ogikubo Station 荻窪駅
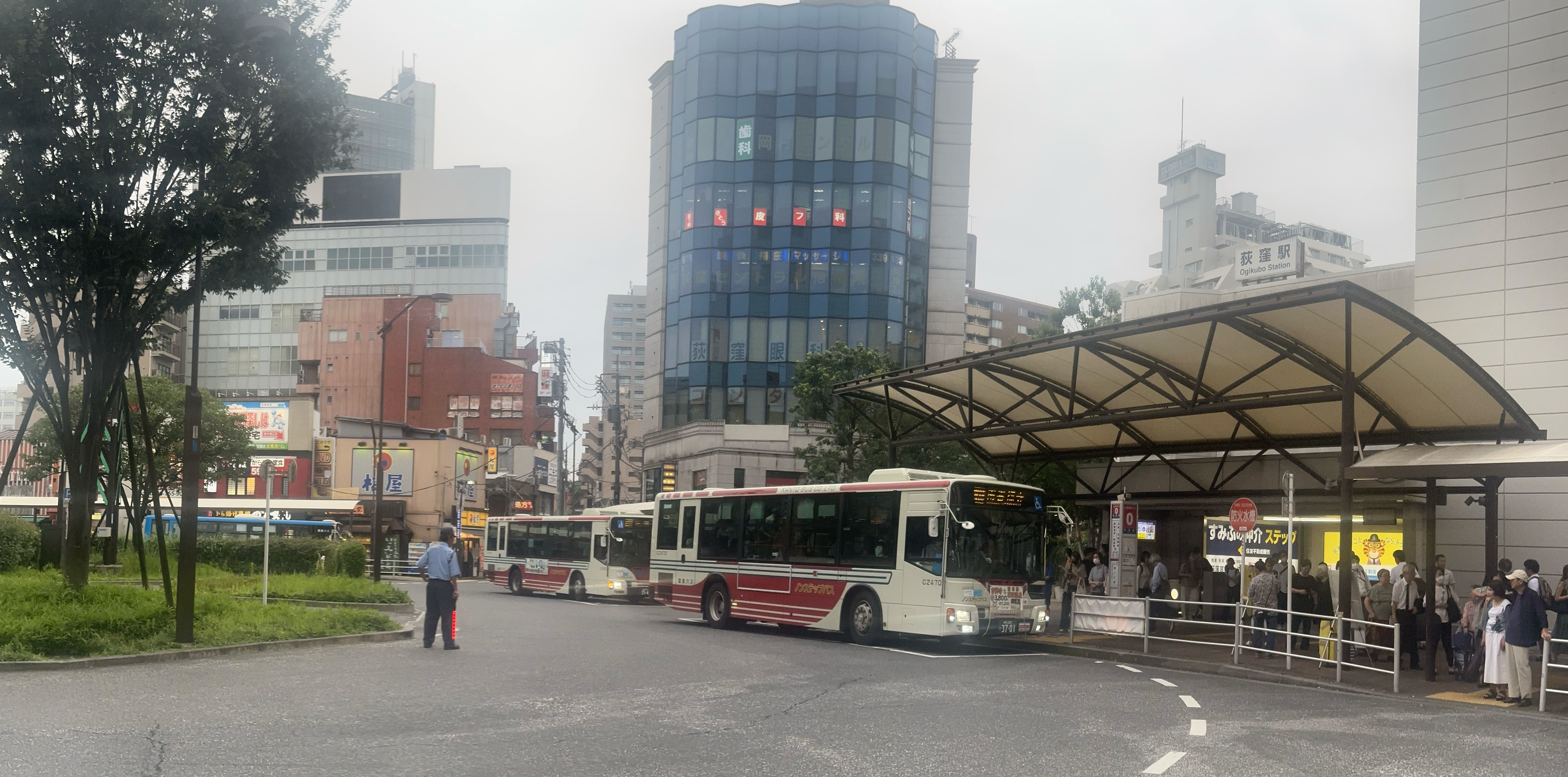
- The north side of Ogikubo Station in July 2024

General information
- Location: Suginami, Tokyo; Japan
- Operator: JR East; Tokyo Metro
- Lines: ■ Chūō Main Line; Marunouchi Line
- Connections: Bus terminal

Other information
- Station code: M-01, JC09, JB04

History
- Opened: 21 December 1891; 134 years ago
Location
- Location within Tokyo wards area Location within Japan

Ogikubo Station (荻窪駅, Ogikubo-eki) is a railway station in Suginami, Tokyo, Japan, jointly operated by the East Japan Railway Company (JR East) and the Tokyo subway operator Tokyo Metro.

== Lines ==
The JR East station is served by the Chūō Main Line (Chūō Line (Rapid) and Chūō-Sōbu Line local services), and is located 18.7 km from the starting point of the Chūō Line at Tokyo Station.

The Tokyo Metro station is served by the Marunouchi Line, and forms the western terminus of the 24.2 km (15.0 mi) line from Ikebukuro. The station is numbered M-01.

== Station layout ==
The JR East station consists of ground-level platforms running east–west, and the underground platforms for the Tokyo Metro station lie parallel to the JR East platforms, slightly to the south. The station has "North" and "South" ("South a" and "South b") entrances at the eastern end of the station and a "West" entrance at the western end.

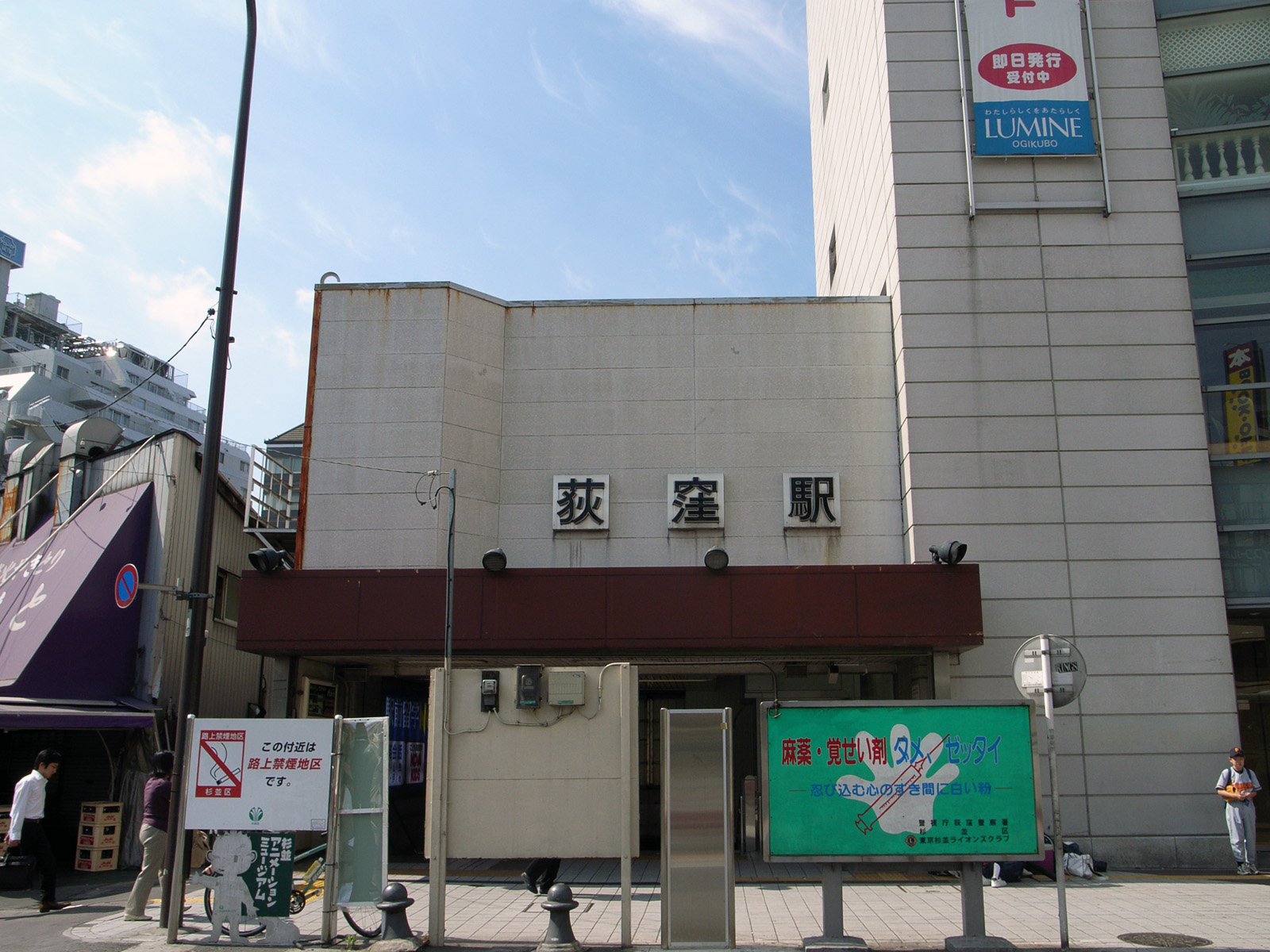
The north entrance in June 2007

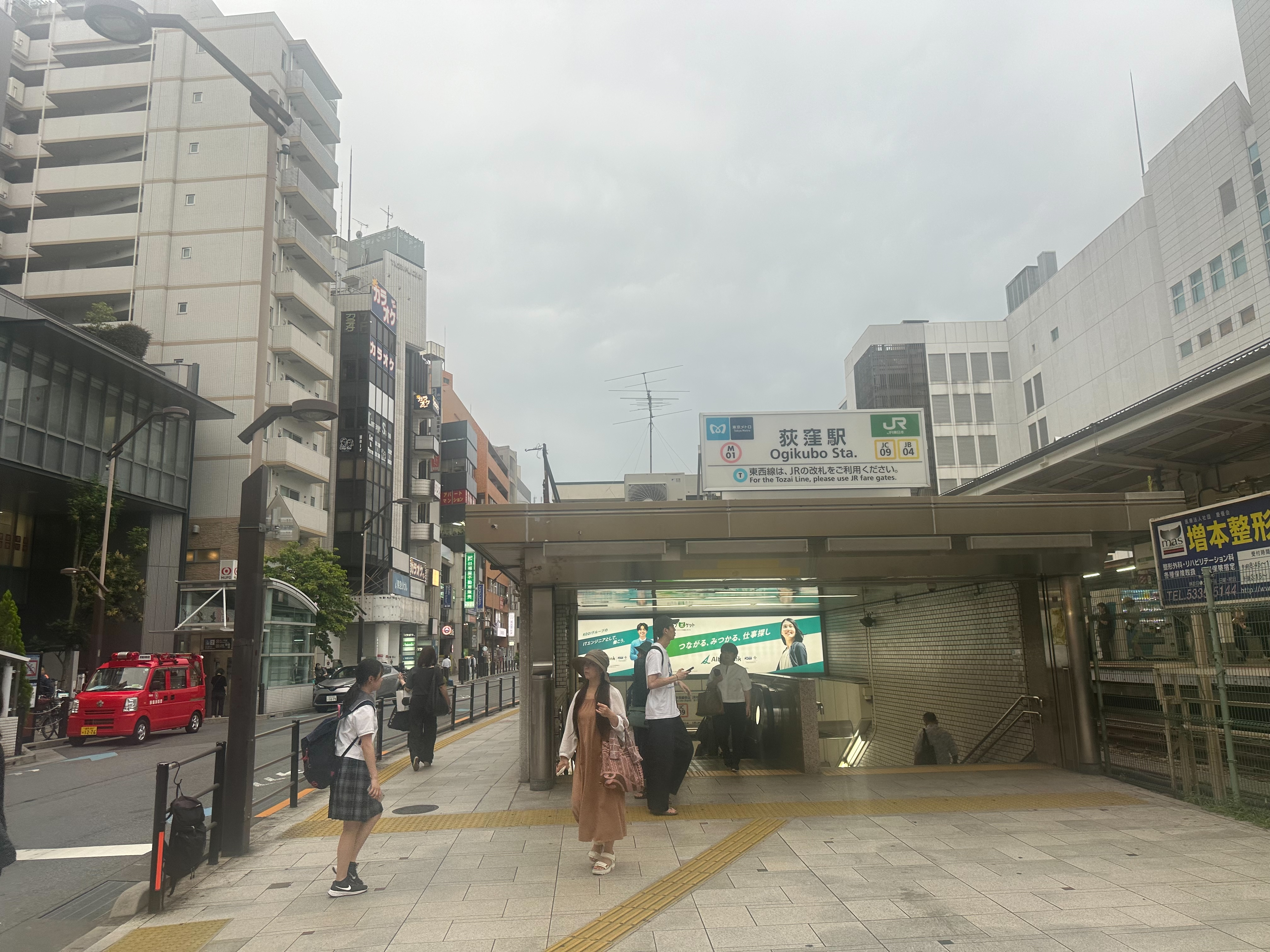
The south b entrance in July 2024

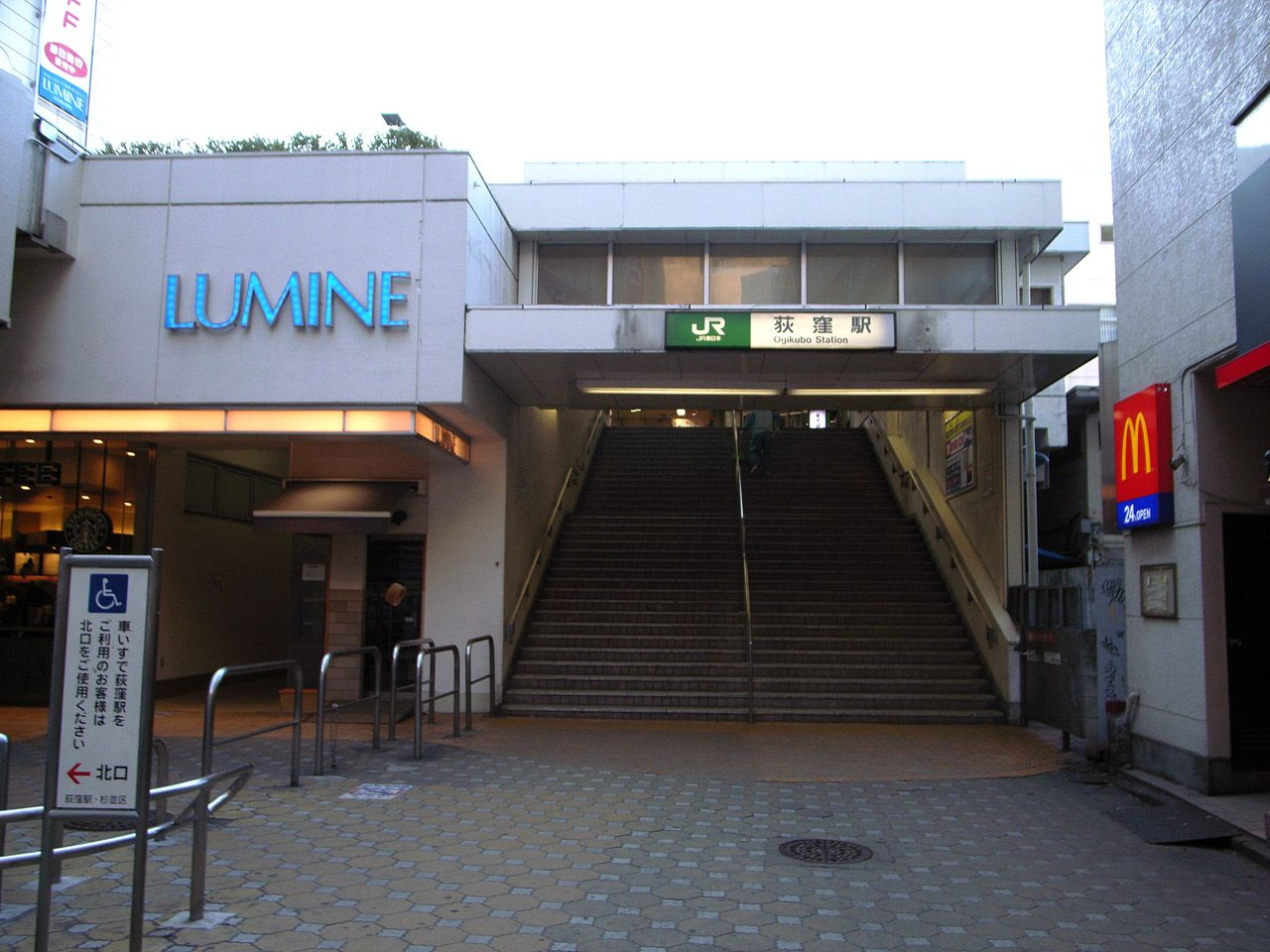
The west (north) entrance in February 2008

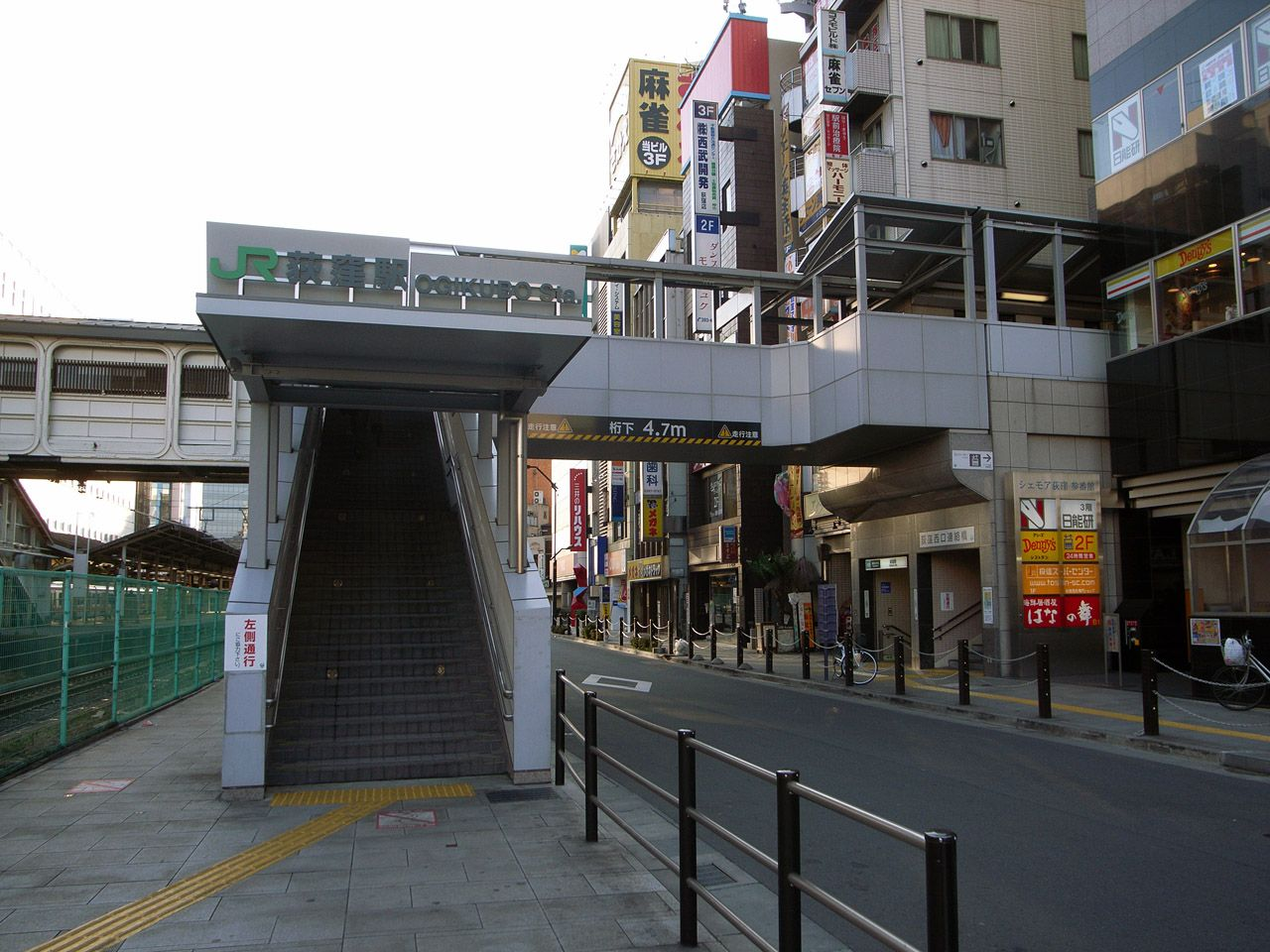
The west (south) entrance in February 2008

== JR East ==
JC09 JB04 Ogikubo Station 荻窪駅
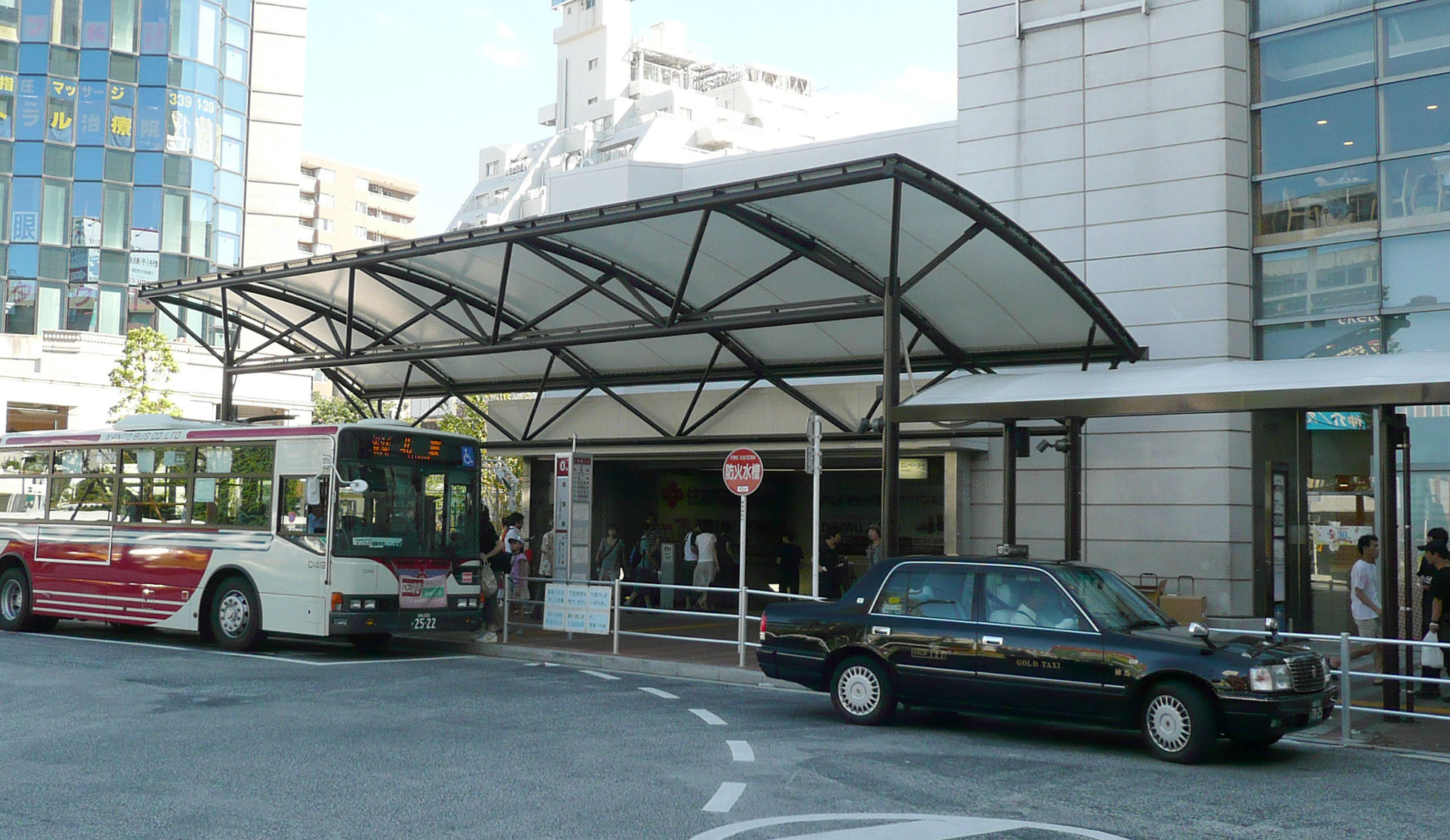
- The north Entrance in September 2011

General information
- Location: 1 Kamiogi, Suginami-ku, Tokyo; Japan
- Operator: JR East
- Lines: Chūō Line (Rapid); Chūō-Sōbu Line
- Platforms: 2 island platforms
- Tracks: 4

Other information
- Station code: JC09, JB04
- Website: Official website

History
- Opened: 21 December 1891; 134 years ago

Passengers
- FY2024: 164,158 (daily)

Services
Preceding station	JR East	Following station
Kichijōji JC11 towards Ōtsuki	Chūō Line Commuter Rapid	Nakano One-way operation
Kichijōji JC11 (weekends) towards Ōtsuki	Chūō Line Rapid	Nakano JC06 (weekends) towards Tokyo
Nishi-Ogikubo JC10 (weekdays) towards Ōtsuki	Chūō Line Rapid	Asagaya JC08 (weekdays) towards Tokyo
Nishi-Ogikubo JB03 towards Mitaka	Chūō–Sōbu Line	Asagaya JB05 towards Chiba
Nishi-Ogikubo JB03 towards Mitaka	Chūō–Sōbu Line via Tōzai Line	Asagaya JB05 towards Tsudanuma
Location

The JR East station has a "Midori no Madoguchi" staffed ticket office and a "View Plaza" travel agent.

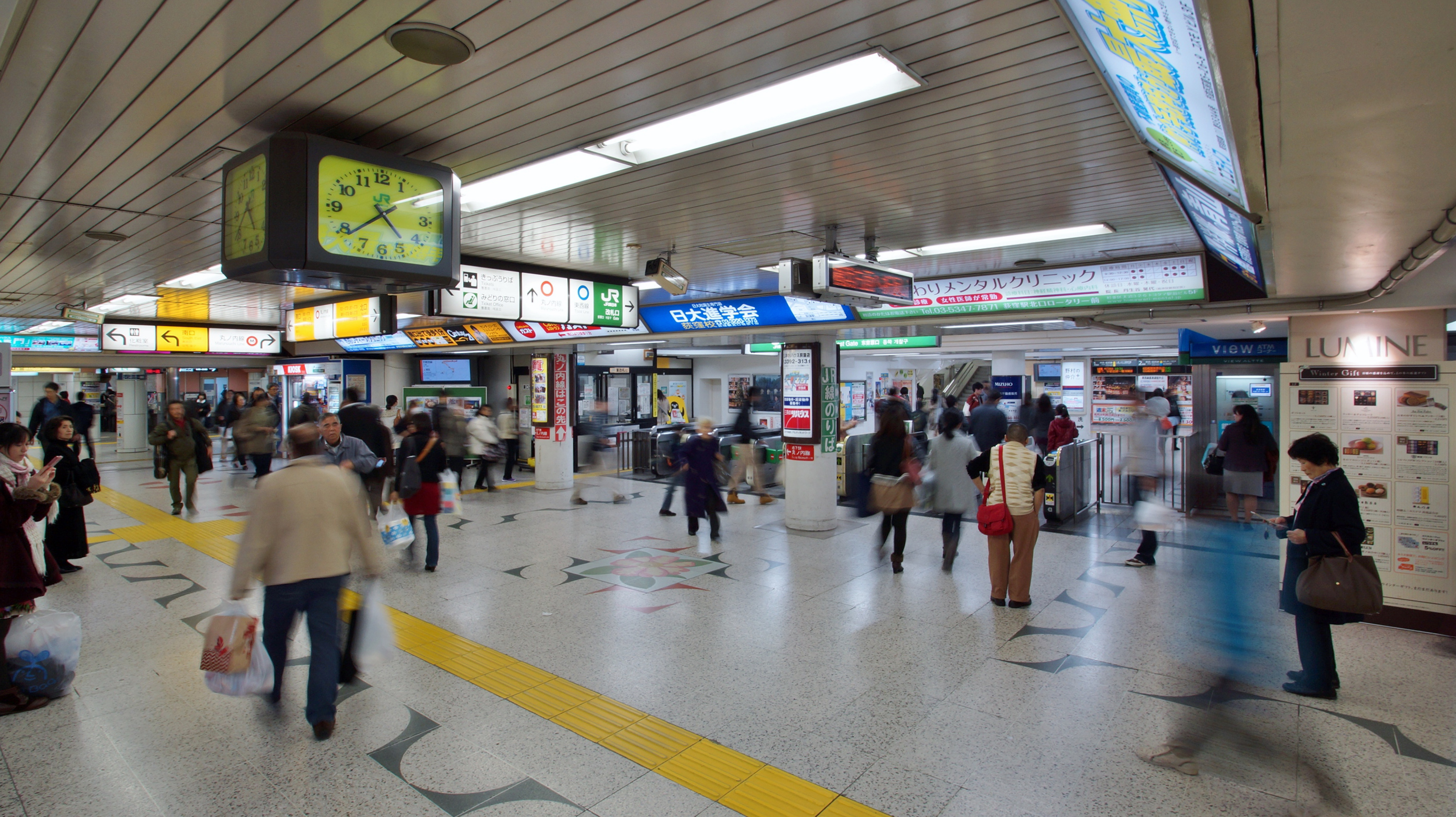
The ticket barriers to the JR platforms at the east end of the station in November 2013

=== Platforms ===
The station consists of two ground-level island platforms serving four tracks.

1	Chūō-Sōbu Line	for Mitaka
2	Chūō-Sōbu Line	for Shinjuku, Akihabara, and Chiba; Tōzai Line for Nakano, Ōtemachi, Nishi-Funabashi
3	Chūō Line (Rapid)	for Tachikawa, Hachiōji, and Takao
4	Chūō Line (Rapid)	for Nakano, Shinjuku, and Tokyo

== Tokyo Metro ==
Ogikubo Station 荻窪駅

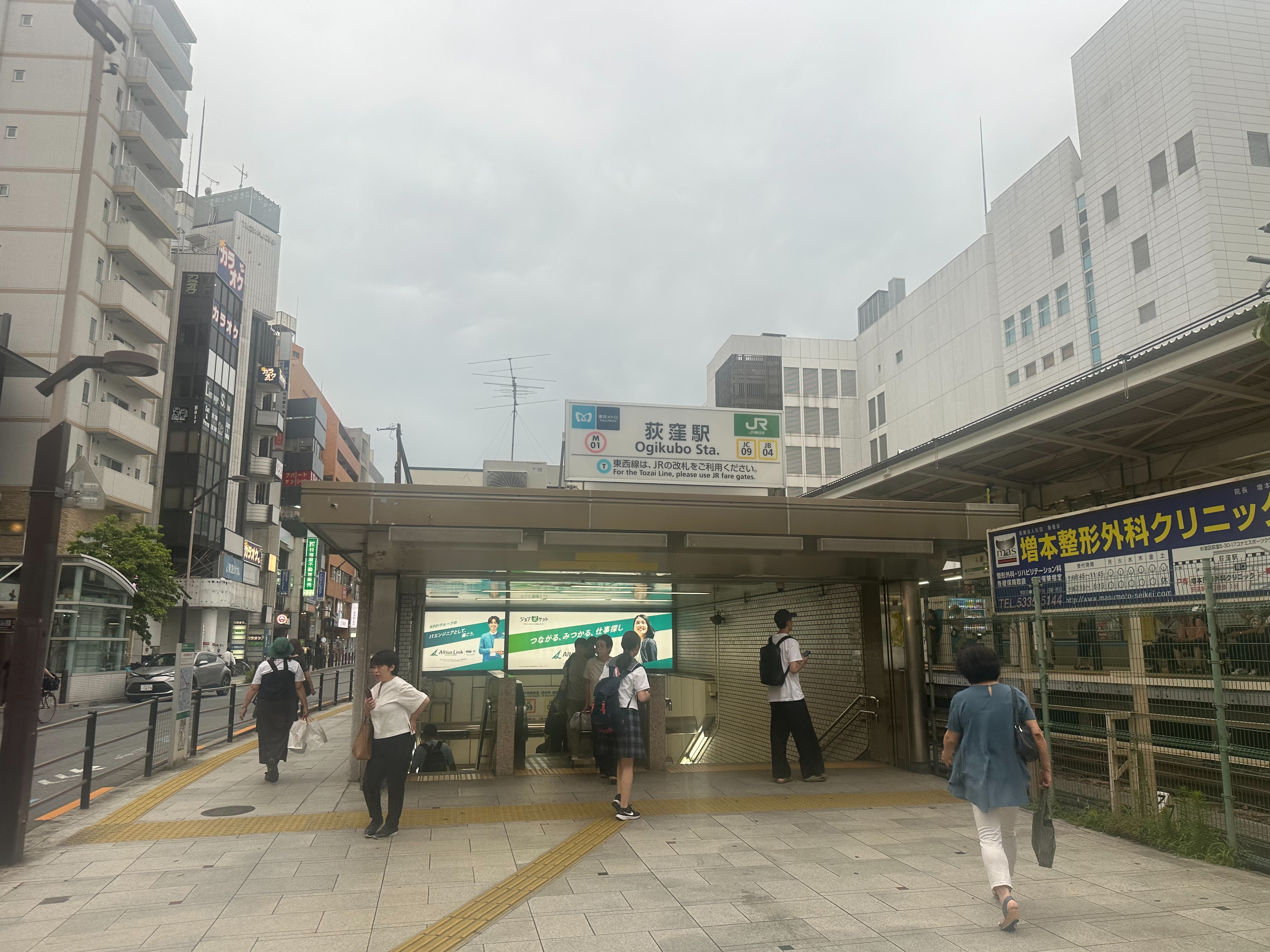
- The south entrance in July 2024

General information
- Location: 5-31-7 Ogikubo, Suginami-ku, Tokyo; Japan
- System: Tokyo Metro station
- Operator: Tokyo Metro
- Line: Marunouchi Line
- Platforms: 1 island platform
- Tracks: 2

Construction
- Structure type: Underground

Other information
- Station code: M-01
- Website: Official website

History
- Opened: 23 January 1962; 64 years ago

Passengers
- FY2024: 85,957 (daily)

Services
Preceding station	Tokyo Metro	Following station
Terminus	Marunouchi Line	Minami-asagaya towards Ikebukuro
Location

The underground Tokyo Metro station consists of an island platform serving two terminating tracks located on the second basement level.

=== Platforms ===
1/2	Marunouchi Line	for Shinjuku, Ginza, and Ikebukuro

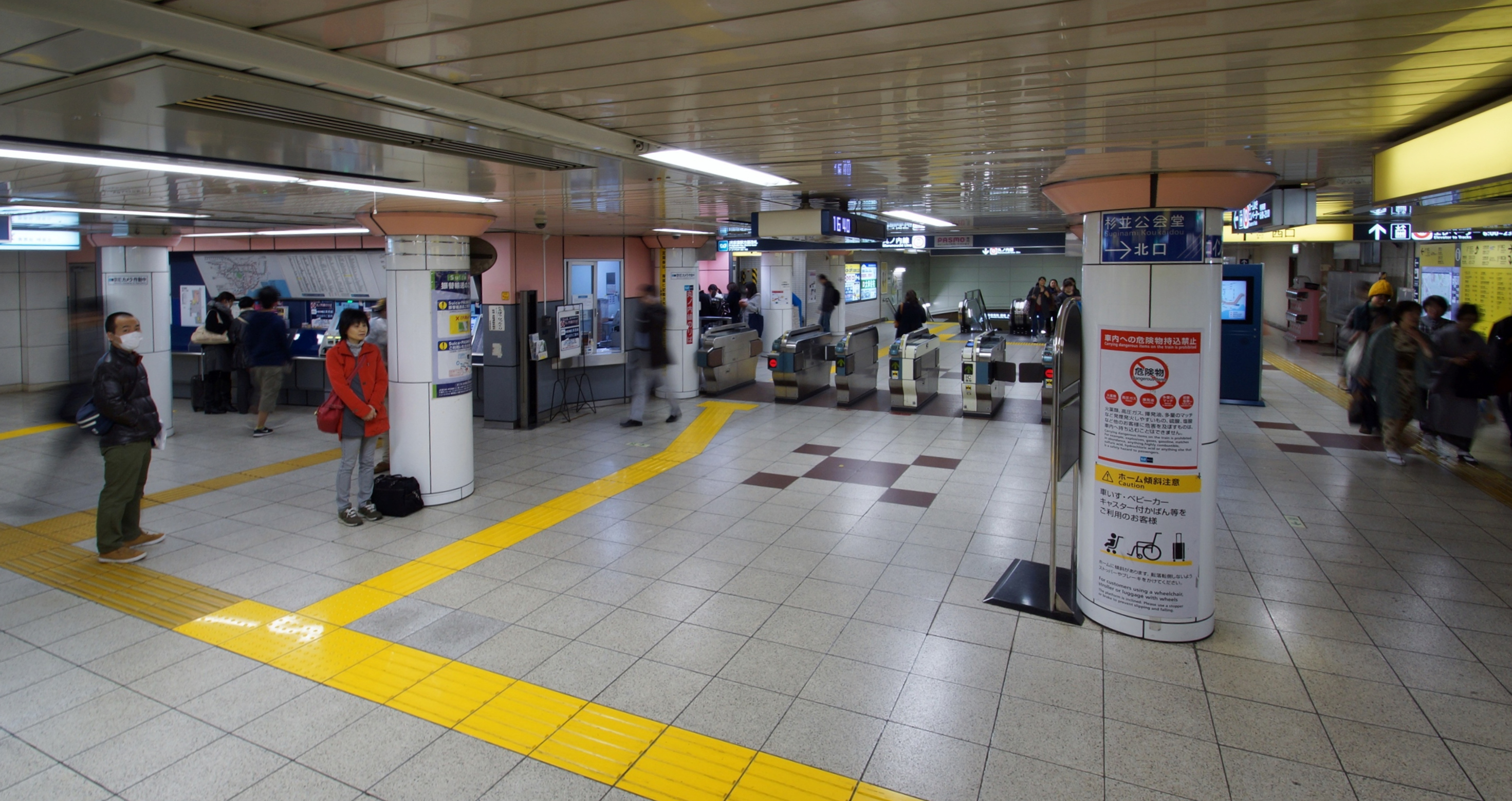
The ticket barriers to the Tokyo Metro platforms at the east end of the station in November 2013

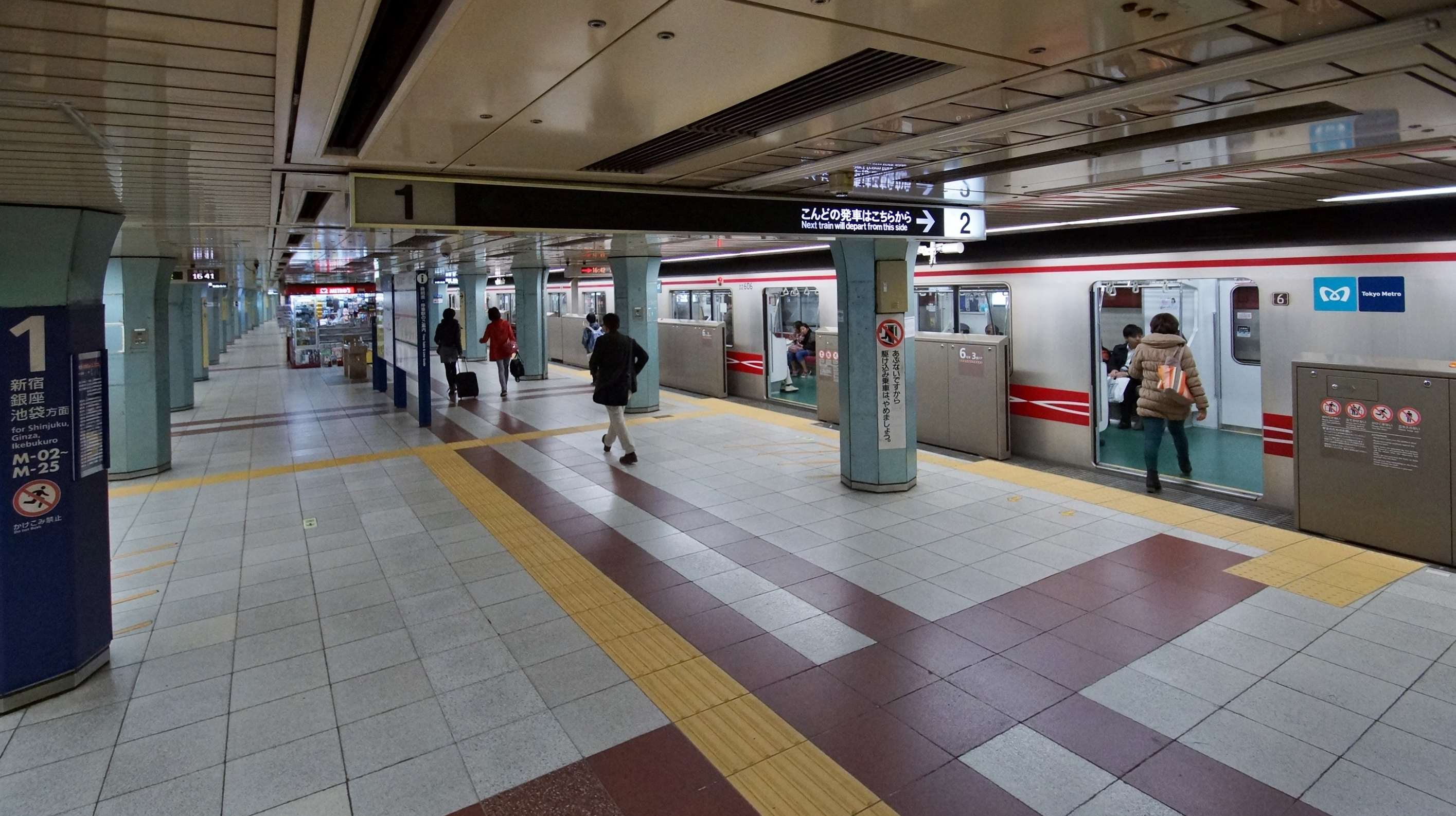
The Tokyo Metro Marunouchi Line platforms in November 2013

== History ==
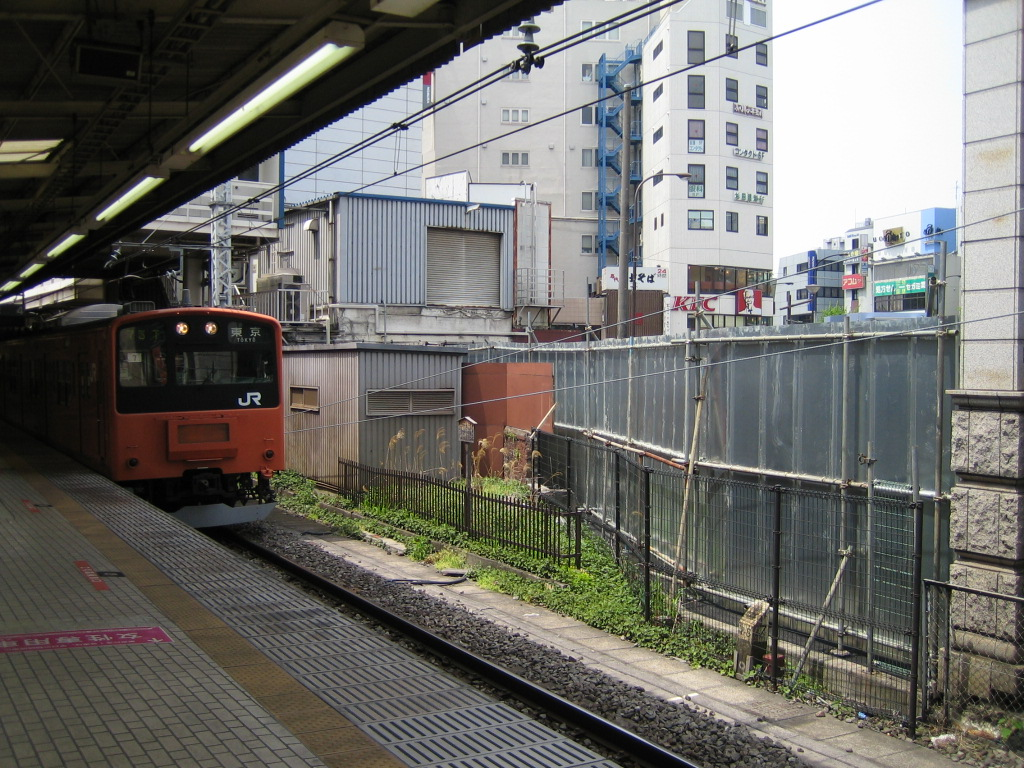
The reed planting that gave the station its name(2010)

The JR East station opened on 21 December 1891. The station for the Marunouchi Line opened on 23 January 1962.

The station facilities of the Marunouchi Line were inherited by Tokyo Metro after the privatization of the Teito Rapid Transit Authority (TRTA) in 2004.

== Passenger statistics ==
In fiscal 2013, the JR East station was used by an average of 86,032 passengers daily (boarding passengers only), making it the 48th-busiest station operated by JR East. In fiscal 2013, the Tokyo Metro station was used by an average of 78,484 passengers per day (exiting and entering passengers), making it the 49th-busiest station operated by Tokyo Metro. The daily average passenger figures for each operator in previous years are as shown below.

Fiscal year	JR East	Tokyo Metro
2000	82,768	
2005	83,095	
2006	84,436	
2007	86,644	
2008	86,838	
2009	85,323	
2010	85,093	
2011	83,299	69,792
2012	85,167	73,576
2013	86,032	78,484

- Note that JR East figures are for boarding passengers only.

The Number of Passengers on Ogikubo as recorded by the East Japan Railway Company Trains in 2017-2022 was 25,684 (（単位 千人）).

== Surrounding area ==
- Suginami Ward Office
- Ogikubo Tax Office
- Tokyo Adventist Hospital
- Tokyo Ogikubo High School
- Ōtaguro Park

== See also ==
- List of railway stations in Japan
