= Suginami =

Special ward of Tokyo

Suginami 杉並区
- Special ward
- Suginami City
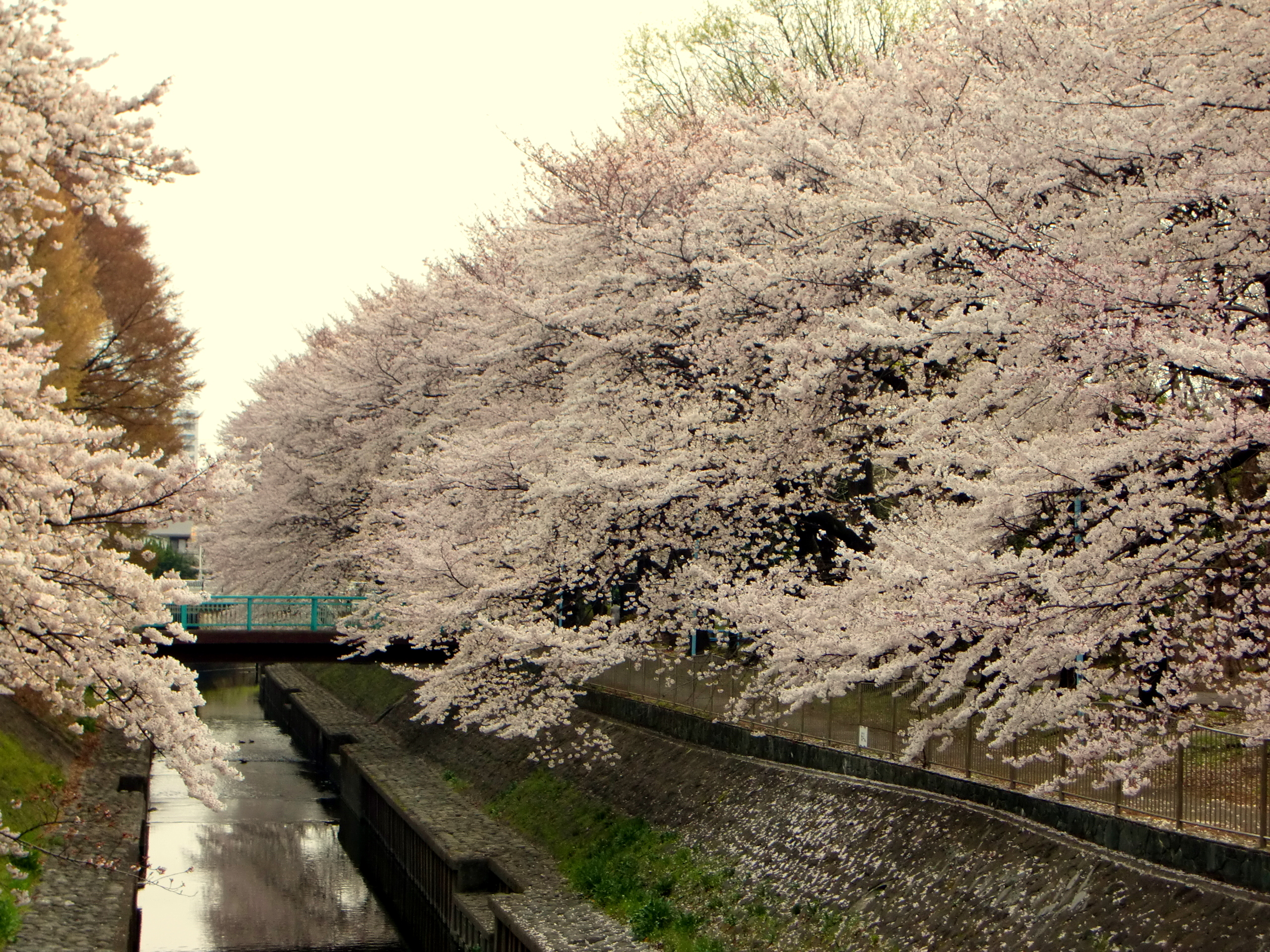
- Spring cherry blossoms in Wadabori Koen Park

- Flag Seal

- Location of Suginami in Tokyo

- Location in Japan
- Coordinates: 35°41′58″N 139°38′11″E
- Country: Japan
- Region: Kantō
- Prefecture: Tokyo
- First official recorded: 4th century
- As Tokyo City: October 1, 1932
- As special ward of Tokyo: July 1, 1943

Government
  - Mayor: Satoko Kishimoto (since July 11, 2022)

Area
  - Total: 34.06 km^{2} (13.15 sq mi)

Population (June 1, 2022)
  - Total: 588,354
  - Density: 17,274/km^{2} (44,740/sq mi)
- Time zone: UTC+09:00 (JST)
- Postal codes: 166-xxxx, 167-xxxx, 168-xxxx
- City hall address: 1-15-1 Asagaya Minami, Suginami-ku, Tokyo; 165-8570
- Website: www.city.suginami.tokyo.jp
- Symbols
- Tree: Pine, Dawn Redwood, Sasanqua

Suginami (杉並区, Suginami-ku; Japanese pronunciation: [sɨ̀.ɡ̟ʲí.nä́.mʲí(.kɯ̈̀), -ŋ̟ʲí-]) is one of the 23 special wards in the Tokyo Metropolis in Japan. The ward refers to itself as Suginami City in English.

The total area is 34.06 km^{2}. As of June 1, 2022, Suginami has an estimated population of 588,354 and a population density of 17,274 persons per km^{2}.

Suginami's mascot is a green little dinosaur called Namisuke.

== Geography ==
Suginami occupies the western part of the ward area of Tokyo. Its neighbors include these special wards: to the east, Shibuya and Nakano; to the north, Nerima; and to the south, Setagaya. Its western neighbors are the cities of Mitaka and Musashino.

The Kanda River passes through Suginami. The Zenpukuji river originates from Zenpukuji Park in western Suginami, and the Myōshōji River originates in Myōshōji Park, to the north of Ogikubo station.

== History ==
The name Suginami dates back to the early Edo period and is a shortened version of Suginamiki ("avenue of cedars"). This name came about when an early land baron, Lord Tadayoshi Okabe, planted a row of cedar trees to mark the bounds of his property.

In 1970, 40 high school students in the area were exposed to photochemical smog and required hospitalization. The incident attracted national attention and increased awareness of the dangers of pollution.

== Demographics ==
Historical population
Year	Pop.	±%
1920	18,099	—
1930	134,529	+643.3%
1940	245,435	+82.4%
1945	211,229	−13.9%
1950	326,610	+54.6%
1960	487,210	+49.2%
1970	553,016	+13.5%
1980	542,449	−1.9%
1990	529,485	−2.4%
2000	522,103	−1.4%
2010	549,569	+5.3%
2020	591,108	+7.6%
Source: Censuses (Note: For years prior to 1930, figures cover the area of present-day Suginami-ku.)

== Districts and neighborhoods ==
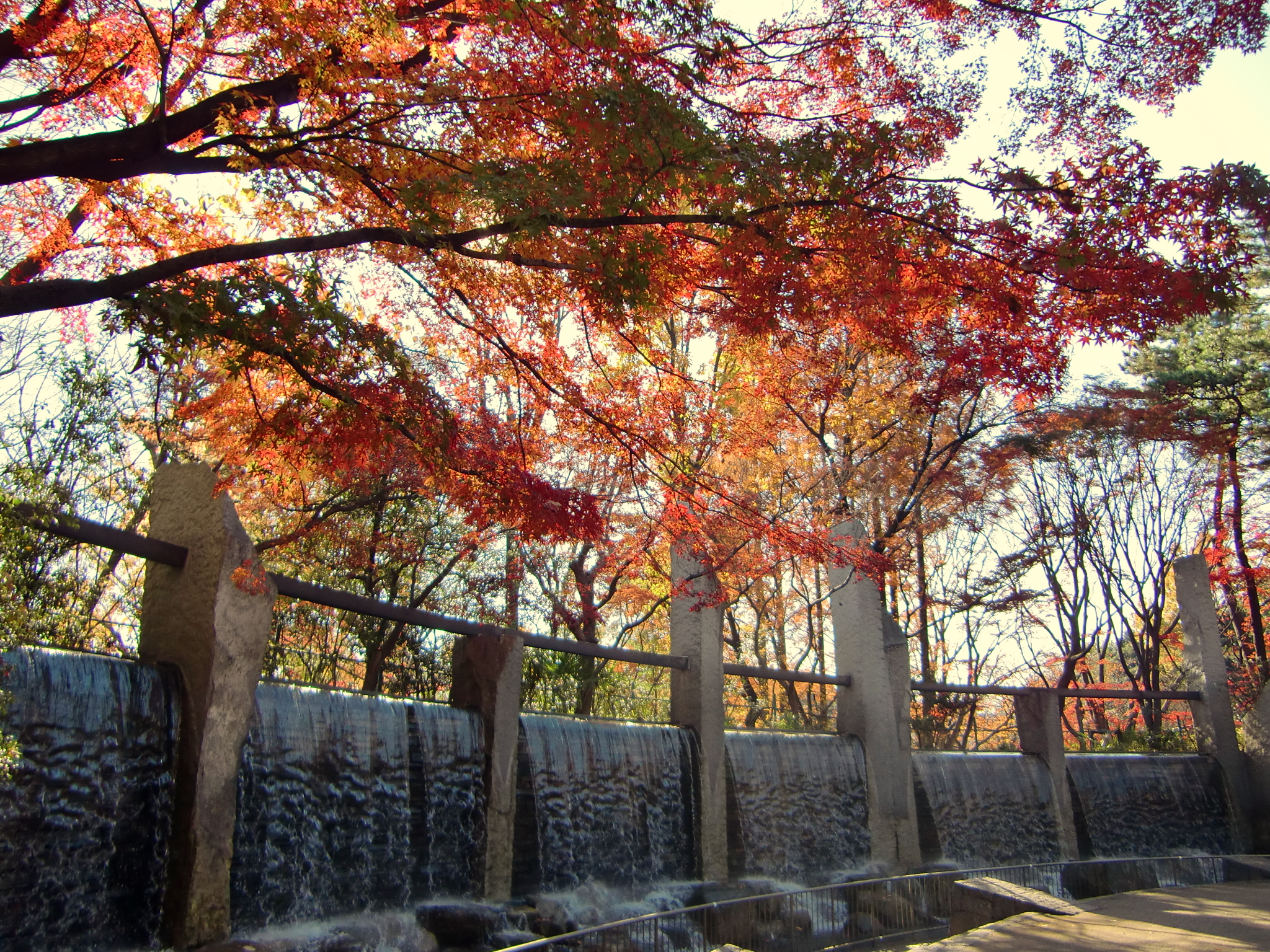
Autumn colors in a park Suginami

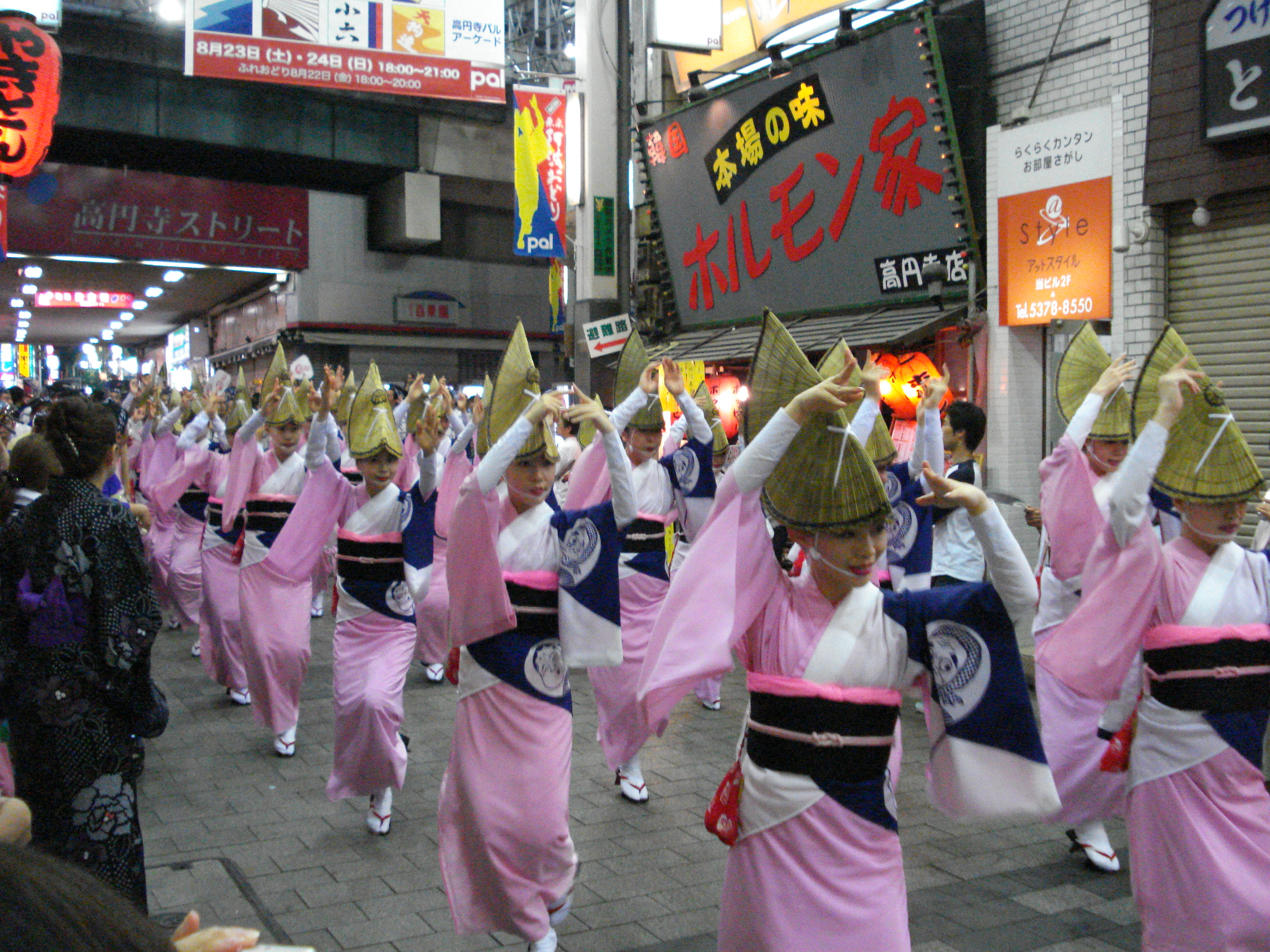
Kōenji Awa Odori

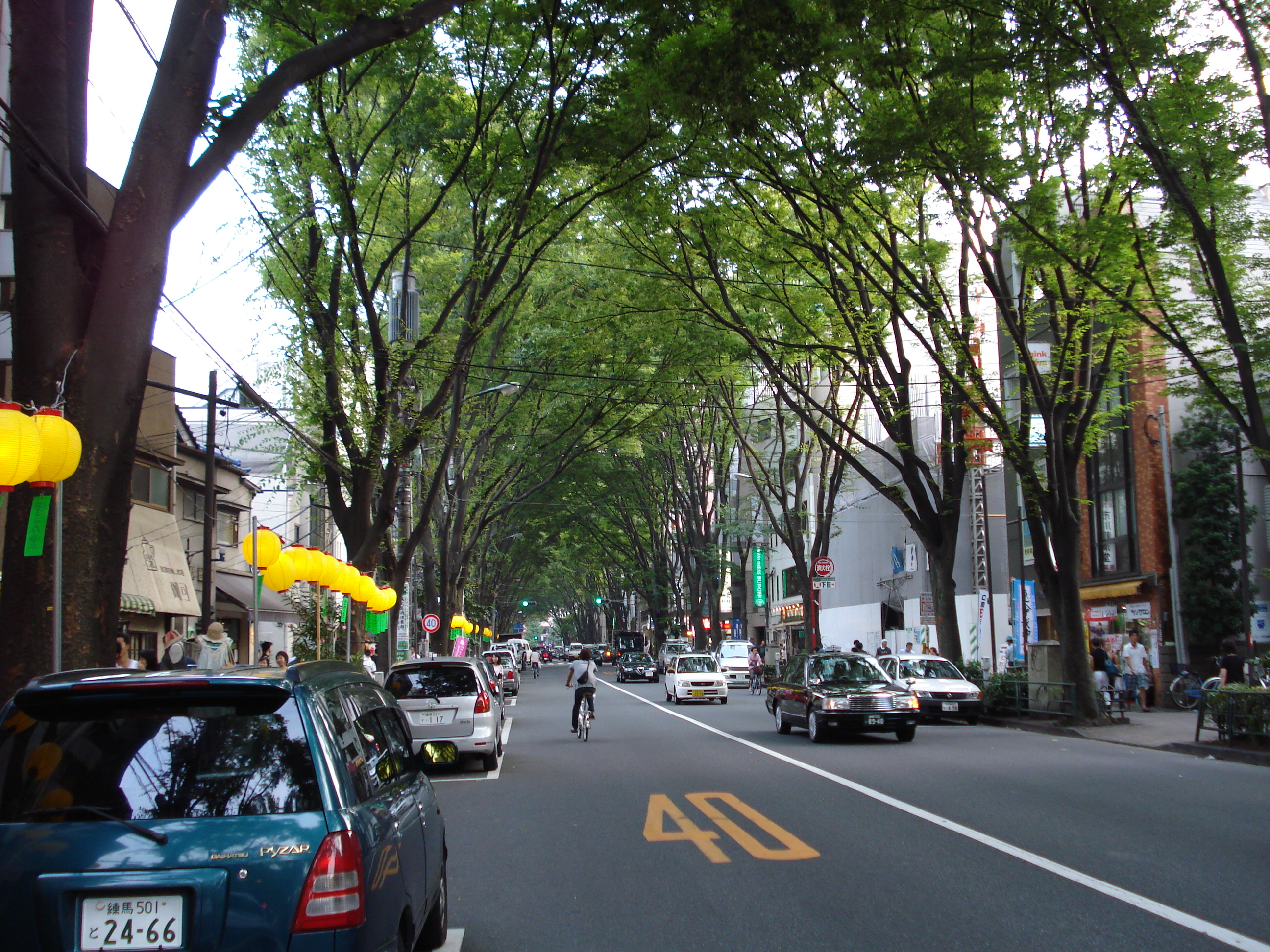
Nakasugidori Avenue near Suginami City Hall and Asagaya Station

The following neighborhoods make up Suginami-ku:

Iogi Area

- Igusa
- Imagawa
- Kamiigusa
- Kamiogi
- Minamiogikubo
- Momoi
- Nishiogikita
- Nishiogiminami
- Ogikubo
- Shimizu
- Shimoigusa
- Zenpukuji

Suginami Area

- Amanuma
- Asagayakita
- Asagayaminami
- Hon'amanuma
- Kōenjikita
- Kōenjiminami
- Naritahigashi
- Naritanishi
- Umezato

Takaido Area

- Hamadayama
- Kamitakaido
- Kugayama
- Miyamae
- Shimotakaido
- Shōan
- Takaido
- Takaidohigashi
- Takaidonishi

Wadabori Area

- Eifuku
- Hōnan
- Horinouchi
- Izumi
- Matsunoki
- Ōmiya
- Wada

== Politics ==
Historically, Suginami has leaned toward liberal activism. In 1954, local housewives launched the "Suginami Appeal" against nuclear weapons, a petition that spread nationwide and ultimately collected 20 million signatures. More recently in 2005, Suginami became part of Japan's fight against nationalist textbook revisionism when residents petitioned Tokyo's courts to prevent the adoption of a controversial textbook published by Fusosha Publishing which claimed to justify Japanese actions during World War II. The ward has also passed an ordinance placing limits on the installation of security cameras.

To combat burglaries, which reached a record number of 1,710 in 2002, the ward created an unconventional anti-crime program called Operation Flower. The ward urged residents to plant flowers facing the street, with the long-term goal of increasing neighborhood watchfulness (necessitated by watering and otherwise attending to the plants). In addition, 9,600 volunteers were recruited for neighborhood safety patrols, 200 security cameras were placed at crime-vulnerable areas, and a daily email update was created for residents. Subsequent to the start of the program, burglaries were down 80% to 390 in 2008.

Suginami refused to connect to Japan's Residents Basic Registry Network. As of 2005, it is implementing a measure to make registry optional.

On June 19, 2022, Satoko Kishimoto was elected mayor despite being a long-time resident of Belgium and not having any connections to the ward. She narrowly defeated 3-term incumbent Ryō Tanaka by less than 200 votes. Kishimoto had come to prominence through online political debates during the COVID-19 pandemic. Kishimoto has opposed building new road extensions through Kōenji district and the privatization of public facilities. Kishimoto was the ward's first female leader, and at the time, one of only 3 female mayors of Tokyo's 23 special wards.

== Transportation ==
=== Rail ===
- JR East
  - Chūō Main Line (Chūō-Sobu Line): Koenji, Asagaya, Ogikubo, Nishi-Ogikubo Stations
- Keio Corporation
  - Keio Line: Hachiman-yama Station, Roka-kōen Station
  - Keio Inokashira Line: Eifuku-cho, Nishi Eifuku, Hamada-yama, Takaido, Fujimi-ga-oka, Kuga-yama Stations
- Seibu Railway
  - Seibu Shinjuku Line: Shimo-Igusa, Iogi, Kami-Igusa Stations
- Tokyo Metro
  - Tokyo Metro Marunouchi Line: Honancho (branch line); Higashi Koenji, Shin-Koenji, Minami Asagaya, Ogikubo Stations

=== Road ===
- National highways: Route 20, the Kōshū Kaidō
- Kan-nana Dori (Number 7 Ring Road)
- Kan-pachi Dori (Number 8 Ring Road)
- Itsukaichi Kaidō (Suginami Akiruno Line, Tokyo Metropolitan Road Route 7)
- Ōme Kaidō

== Shopping streets and commercial facilities ==
- Koenji Station Plaza
- Koenji Junjo Shopping Street - Koenji Station. This is also the title of the novel of the same name by Shoichi Nishime.
- Asagaya Pearl Center - It is also famous as the venue for the Asagaya Tanabata Festival every summer.
- Ogikubo Lumine - JR Ogikubo Station
- City Seven - Ogikubo Ekimae

== Education ==
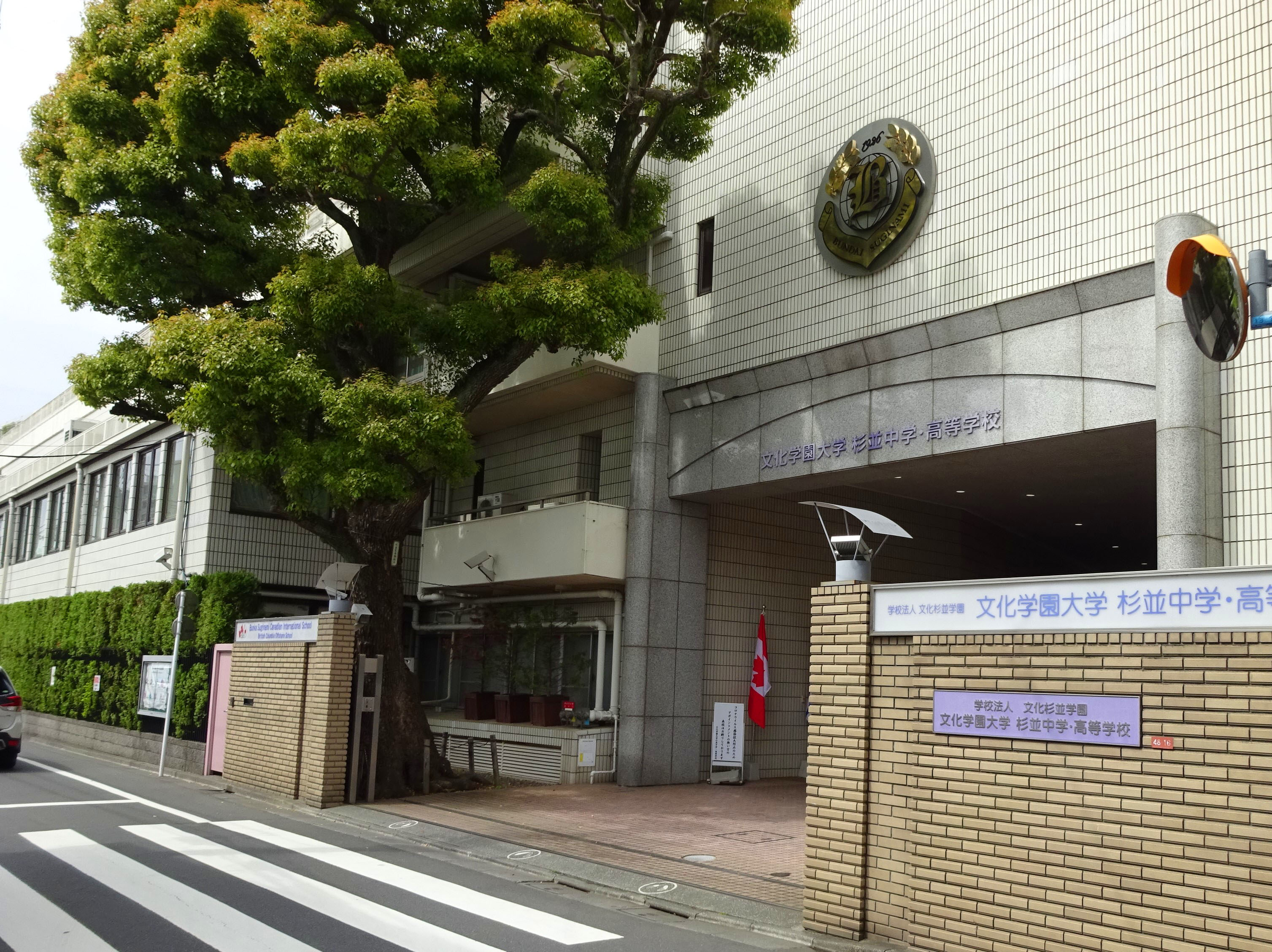
Bunka Suginami Canadian International School and Bunka Gakuen Junior and Senior High Schools

Public high schools are operated by the Tokyo Metropolitan Government Board of Education.

- Nishi High School
- Nogei High School
- Ogikubo High School
- Suginami High School
- Suginami Sogo High School
- Suginami Technical High School
- Toyotama High School

Suginami City operates public elementary and junior high schools.

Municipal combined elementary and junior high schools:

- Koenji Gakuen (高円寺学園)
- Suginami Izumi Gakuen (杉並和泉学園)

Municipal junior high schools:

- Amanuma Junior High School (天沼中学校)
- Asagaya Junior High School (阿佐ヶ谷中学校)
- Fujimigaoka Junior High School (富士見丘中学校)
- Higashida Junior High School (東田中学校)
- Higashihara Junior High School (東原中学校)
- Igusa Junior High School (井草中学校)
- Iogi Junior High School (井荻中学校)
- Konan Junior High School (高南中学校)
- Koyo Junior High School (向陽中学校)
- Matsunoki Junior High School (松ノ木中学校)
- Miyamae Junior High School (宮前中学校)
- Nakase Junior High School (中瀬中学校)
- Nishimiya Junior High School (西宮中学校)
- Ogikubo Junior High School (荻窪中学校)
- Omiya Junior High School (大宮中学校)
- Sen-nan Junior High School (泉南中学校)
- Shinmei Junior High School (神明中学校)
- Shokei Junior High School (松溪中学校)
- Sugimori Junior High School (杉森中学校)
- Takaido Junior High School (高井戸中学校)
- Wada Junior High School (和田中学校)

Municipal elementary schools:

- Amanuma (天沼小学校)
- Eifuku (永福小学校)
- Fujimigaoka (富士見丘小学校)
- Hachinari (八成小学校)
- Hamadayama (浜田山小学校)
- Higashita (東田小学校)
- Honan (方南小学校)
- Horinouchi (堀之内小学校)
- Iogi (井荻小学校)
- Kugayama (久我山小学校)
- Kutsukake (沓掛小学校)
- Mabashi (馬橋小学校)
- Matsunoki (松ノ木小学校)
- Momoi No. 1 (桃井第一小学校)
- Momoi No. 2 (桃井第二小学校)
- Momoi No. 3 (桃井第三小学校)
- Momoi No. 4 (桃井第四小学校)
- Momoi No. 5 (桃井第五小学校)
- Nishita (西田小学校)
- Ogikubo (荻窪小学校)
- Omiya (大宮小学校)
- Sanya (三谷小学校)
- Seibi (済美小学校)
- Shinomiya (四宮小学校)
- Shoan (松庵小学校)
- Suginami No. 1 (杉並第一小学校)
- Suginami No. 2 (杉並第ニ小学校)
- Suginami No. 3 (杉並第三小学校)
- Suginami No. 6 (杉並第六小学校)
- Suginami No. 7 (杉並第七小学校)
- Suginami No. 9 (杉並第九小学校)
- Suginami No. 10 (杉並第十小学校)
- Takaido (高井戸小学校)
- Takaido No. 2 (高井戸第二小学校)
- Takaido No. 3 (高井戸第三小学校)
- Takaido No. 4 (高井戸第四小学校)
- Takaido Higashi (高井戸東小学校)
- Wada (和田小学校)

International schools:

- Bunka Suginami Canadian International School
- Tokyo Korean 9th Elementary School (東京朝鮮第九初級学校) - North Korean school

Higher Education:

- Meiji University, Izumi Campus

== Economy ==
=== Agriculture ===
There are approximately 46 hectares of farmland and nearly two hundred farmers in the hall, and vegetables, flowers, plants and fruits are produced.

=== Animation ===
Several animation studios are located in Suginami. Bones is headquartered in Igusa, while Sunrise has its headquarters near the Kami-Igusa Station on the Seibu Shinjuku Line. Bones was founded by former members of Sunrise, and staff at each company often help each other on projects. The Satelight studio, founded in Sapporo, relocated to the Asagaya neighborhood in 2006 (an earlier Tokyo office, at a different location in Suginami, had been in existence since 2003). In addition, many smaller studios are based here; as of 2006, over 70 studios (of 400 throughout Japan) were located in Suginami.

=== Japanese operations ===
The communications and electronics giant Iwatsu Electric is headquartered in Kugayama.

=== Foreign operations ===
American Express used to have its Japanese headquarters south of Ogikubo station, but it moved to Toranomon in central Tokyo in 2020.

Microsoft has a branch office in the Daitabashi Asahi Seimei Building in Izumi.

=== Former economic operations ===
Prior to its disestablishment, Data East had its headquarters in Suginami.

== Culture ==
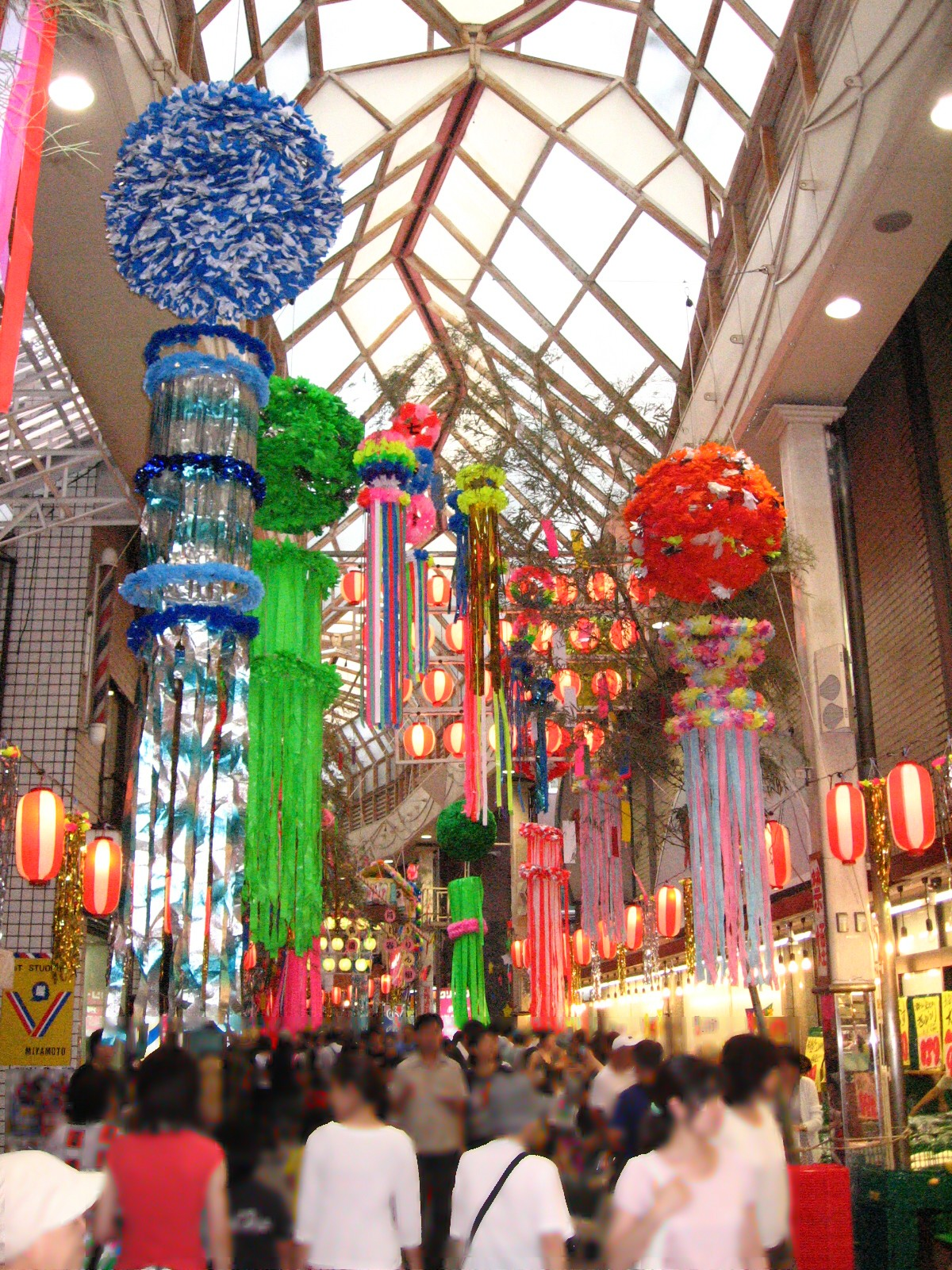
Asagaya Tanabata Festival, held in August

- Ōmiya Hachiman Shrine
- Suginami Kokaido: a concert hall and the home of the Japan Philharmonic Orchestra. It is also the same place where Birth of Ultraman (ウルトラマン誕生, Urutoraman Tanjō), the pre-premiere special of Ultraman was held which recorded on July 9, 1966 and later aired on Tokyo Broadcasting System (the Ultra Series' original network before TV Tokyo) the next day in 7:00 pm. In fact, as a tribute to the 50th anniversary of the Ultra Series, "Ultraman Day" (ウルトラマンの日, Urutoraman no Hi) was held in Suginami Kokaido on July 10, 2016.
- Suginami Animation Museum: a small museum which includes a screening theater, library, and historical overview of Japanese animation, with English language explanations.
- Za Koenji Theater

Suginami has attracted artists for a long time. Among those living there are: Hayao Miyazaki, writer and radio anchor Shoichi Ozawa, or painter Hiroshi Senju.

=== Annual events ===
==== February ====
- Koenji Engei Festival

==== April ====
- Koenji Surprise Street Performance

==== June ====
- Kogayama Bullring Festival - 1st Saturday and Sunday of June

==== August ====
- Asatani Tanabata Festival - August 5th, 9th, Asatani Pearl Center
- Tokyo Koenji Awa Odori - Around Koenji Station on the last Saturday and Sunday of August

==== October ====
- Asagaya Jazz Street - October 3rd or 4th, Friday and Saturday
- Koenji Festival - Adult Cultural Festival

==== November ====
- Suginami Local Performing Arts Competition
- Ogikubo Music Festival
- Troll Forest - Outdoor Art Exhibition (Nishi-Ogikubo, Zenpukuji Pond)
- Suvarami Festa - Kumin Matsuri (festival) held in Momoiharabana Park
