= Takanodai Station =

Railway station in Kodaira, Tokyo, Japan

SK03 Takanodai Station 鷹の台駅
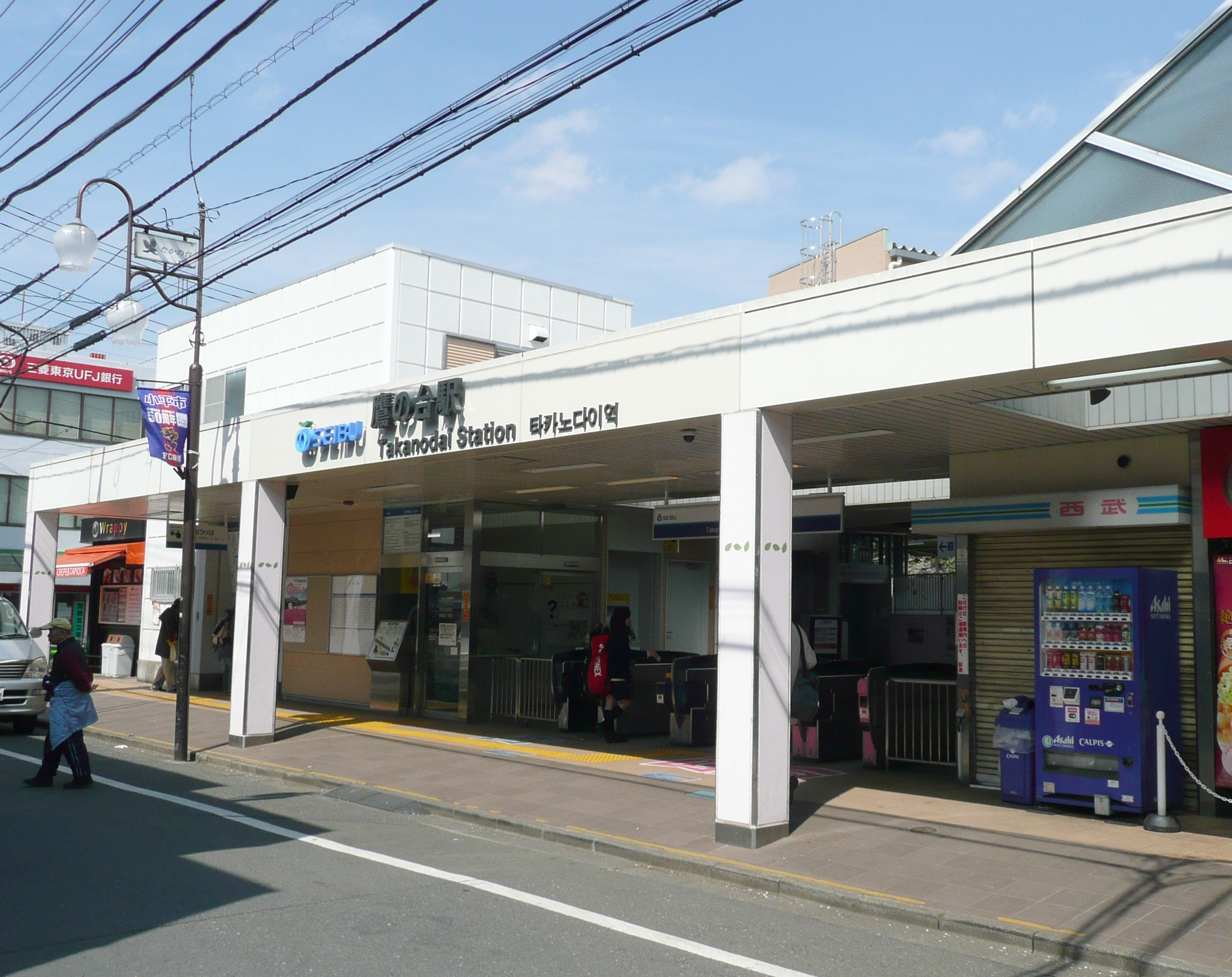
- The station entrance, April 2012

General information
- Location: 45–4 Takanodai, Kodaira-shi, Tokyo 187-0024; Japan
- Coordinates: 35°43′24″N 139°27′39″E
- Operator: Seibu Railway
- Line: Seibu Kokubunji Line
- Distance: 3.6 km from Kokubunji
- Platforms: 2 side platforms
- Connections

Other information
- Station code: SK03
- Website: Official website

History
- Opened: 21 October 1948

Passengers
- FY 2019: 25,914 daily

Services
| Preceding station | Seibu Railway | Following station |
|---|---|---|
| Ogawa SK04 towards Higashi-Murayama | Kokubunji Line | Koigakubo SK02 towards Kokubunji |
Location
- Location within Tokyo Location within Japan

Takanodai Station (鷹の台駅, Takanodai-eki) is a passenger railway station located in the city of Kodaira, Tokyo, Japan, operated by the private railway operator Seibu Railway.

== Lines ==
Takanodai Station is served by the Seibu Kokubunji Line from Higashi-Murayama to Kokubunji, and is located 4.2 km from the starting point of the line at Higashi-Murayama.

== Station layout ==
The station has two ground-level side platforms serving two tracks. The station building and entrance is located on the west side of the station, and the platforms are connected by an underpass.

=== Platforms ===
| 1 | Seibu Kokubunji Line | for Higashi-Murayama |
| 2 | Seibu Kokubunji Line | for Kokubunji |

== History ==
Takanodai Station opened on 21 October 1948.

Station numbering was introduced on all Seibu Railway lines during fiscal 2012, with Takanodai Station becoming "SK03".

== Passenger statistics ==
In fiscal 2019, the station was the 39th busiest on the Seibu network with an average of 25,914 passengers daily.

The passenger figures for previous years are as shown below.

| Fiscal year | Daily average |
|---|---|
| 2005 | 26,657 |
| 2010 | 26,389 |
| 2015 | 26,642 |

== Surrounding area ==
- Musashino Art University
- Korea University
- Tsuda College

== See also ==
- List of railway stations in Japan
