= Koigakubo Station =

Railway station in Kokubunji, Tokyo, Japan

SK02 Koigakubo Station 恋ヶ窪駅
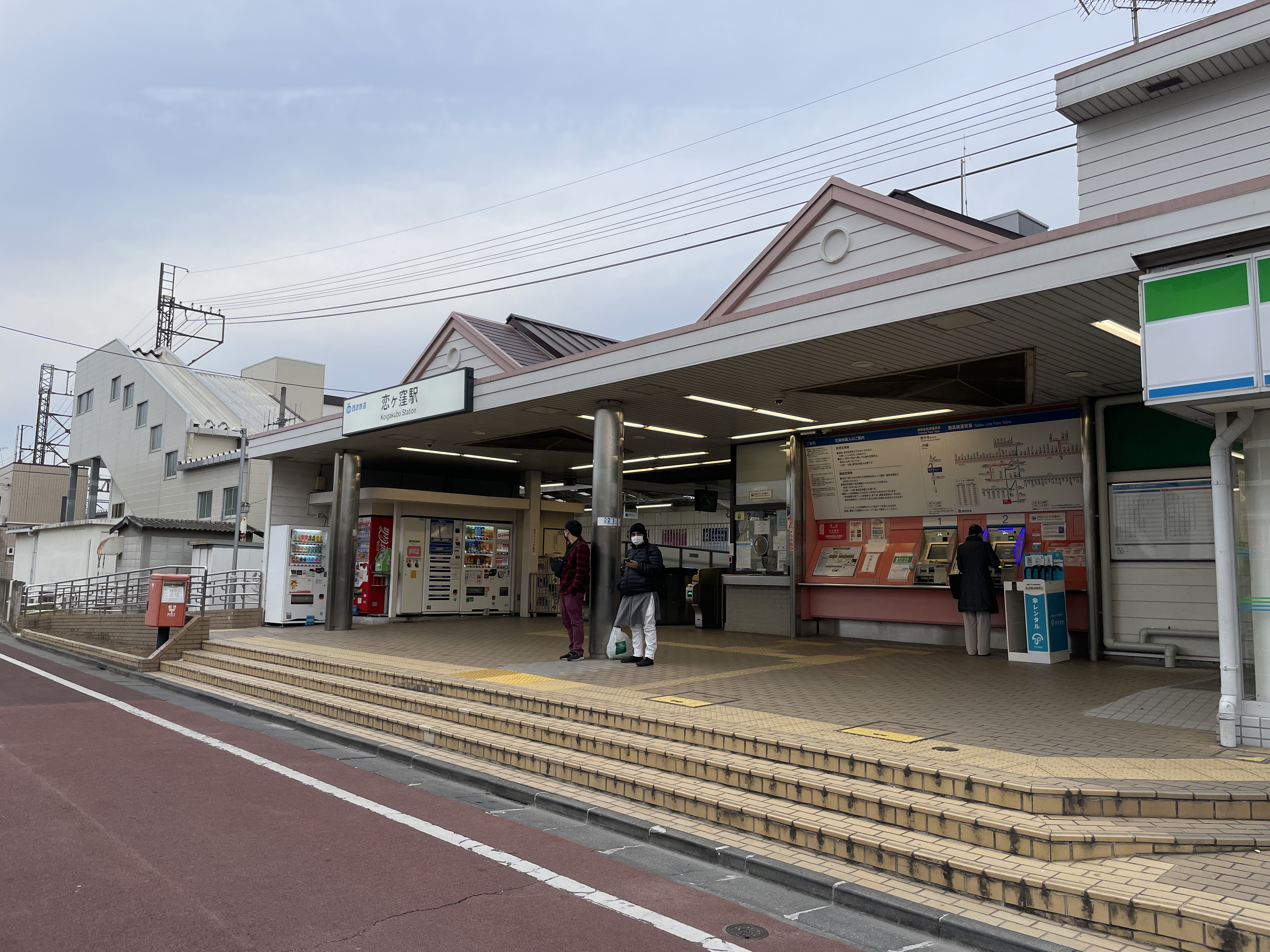
- Koigakubo Station entrance in January 2023

General information
- Location: 1 Chome-1-4 Tokura, Kokubunji, Tokyo 185-0003, Japan; Japan
- Coordinates: 35°42′40″N 139°27′51″E
- Operator: Seibu Railway
- Line: Seibu Kokubunji Line
- Platforms: 2 side platforms
- Connections: Bus stop

Other information
- Station code: SK02
- Website: Official website

History
- Opened: 10 February 1955

Passengers
- FY2019: 12,851 daily

Services
Preceding station	Seibu Railway	Following station
Takanodai SK03 towards Higashi-Murayama	Kokubunji Line	Kokubunji SK01 Terminus
Location
- Location within Tokyo Location within Japan

Koigakubo Station (恋ヶ窪駅, Koigakubo-eki) is a passenger railway station located in the city of Kokubunji, Tokyo, Japan, operated by the private railway operator Seibu Railway.

== Lines ==
Koigakubo Station is served by the Seibu Kokubunji Line from Higashi-Murayama to Kokubunji, and is located 5.7 km from the starting point of the line at Higashi-Murayama.

== Station layout ==
The station has two ground-level side platforms serving two tracks. The station building and entrance is located on the south side of the station, and the platforms are connected by a footbridge.

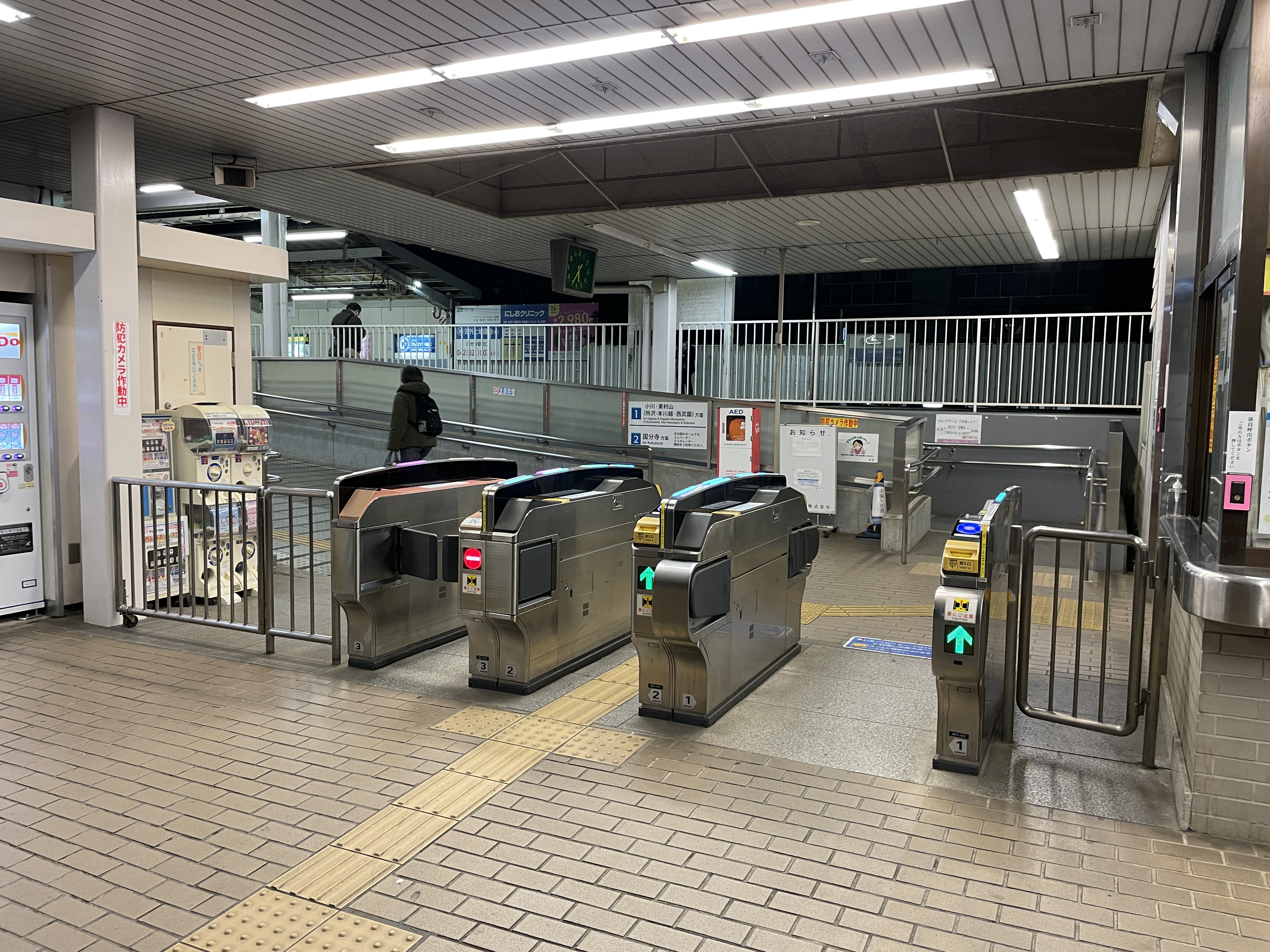
Ticket gates in January 2023

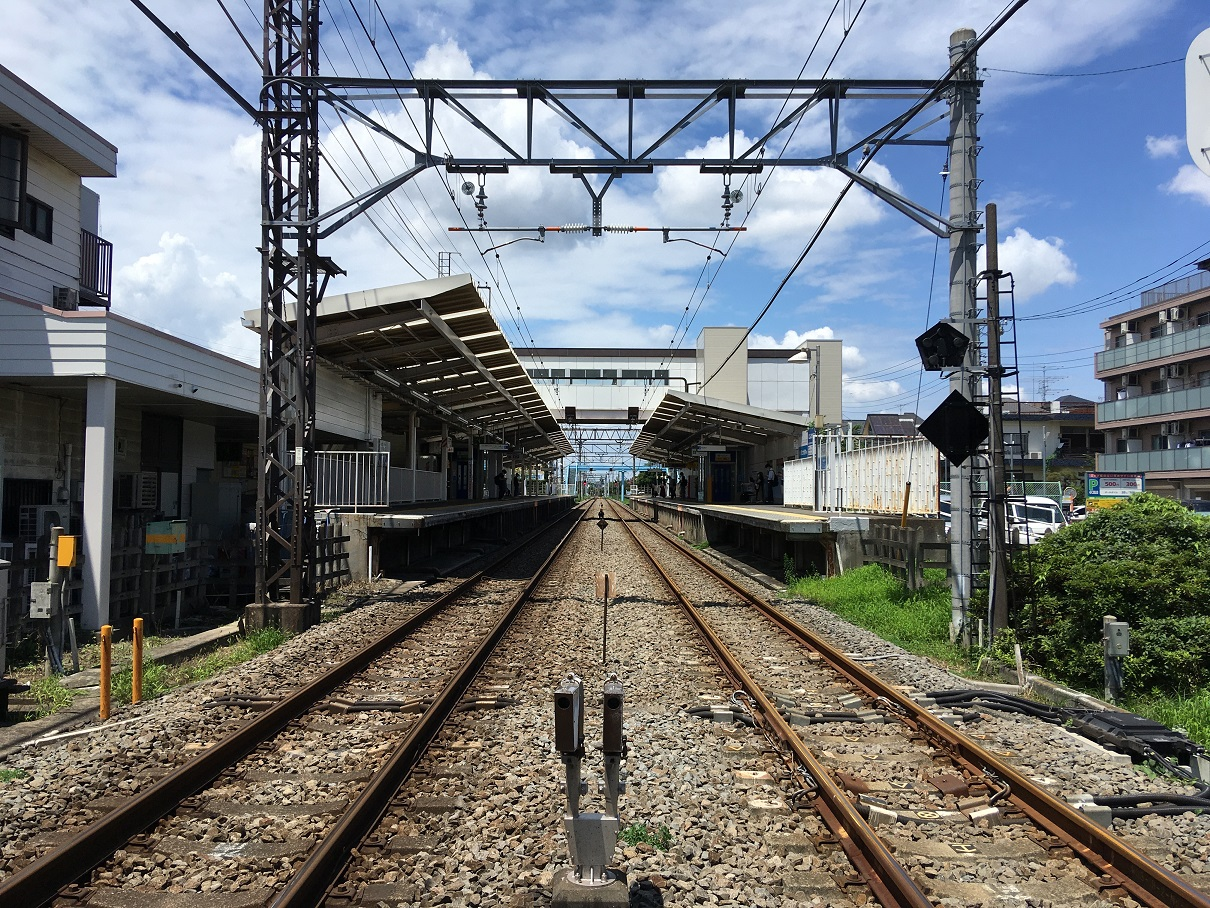
Platform in August 2020 (Taken from the railroad crossing side)

=== Platforms ===
1	Seibu Kokubunji Line	for Higashi-Murayama
2	Seibu Kokubunji Line	for Kokubunji

== History ==
Koigakubo Station opened on 10 February 1955. Access between the platforms was originally via a level crossing for passengers, but this was replaced by a footbridge in 1986. Wheelchair access in the form of ramps and lifts was added in 2006.

Station numbering was introduced on all Seibu Railway lines during fiscal 2012, with Koigakubo Station becoming "SK02".

== Passenger statistics ==
In fiscal 2019, the station was the 63rd busiest on the Seibu network with an average of 12,851 passengers daily.

The passenger figures for previous years are as shown below.

Fiscal year	Daily average
2000	10,828
2005	11,044
2010	11,009
2015	12,243

== Surrounding area ==
- Kokubunji City Hall
