= Seibu 8000 series =

Japanese electric multiple unit train type

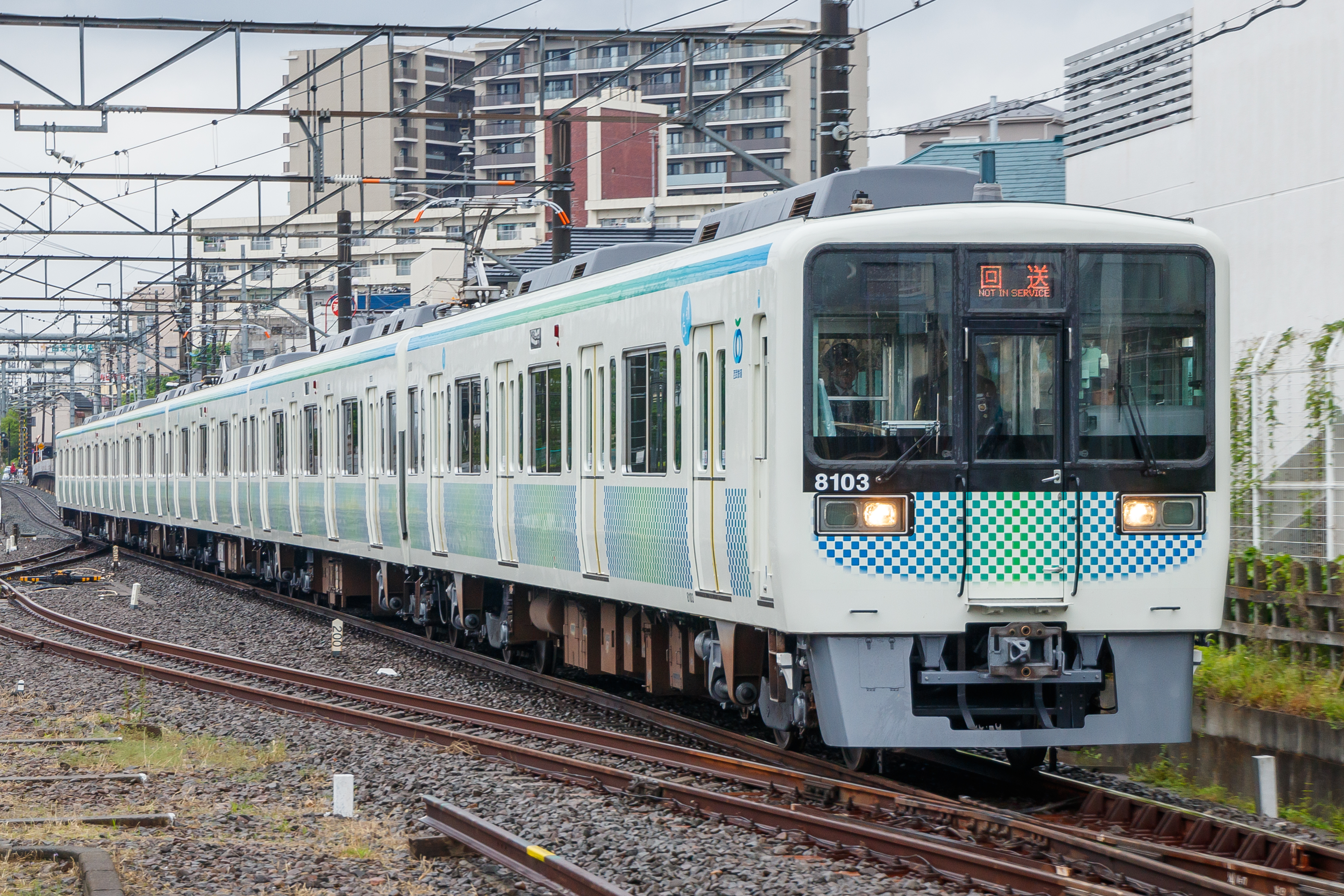
- An 8000 series set in May 2025
- In service: 31 May 2025-
- Manufacturer: Nippon Sharyo, Kawasaki Heavy Industries, Tokyu Car Corporation (as Odakyu 8000 series); Odakyu Engineering (conversion)
- Replaced: Seibu 2000 series
- Constructed: 1985 (as Odakyu 8000 series); 2024– (conversion)
- Number under construction: 42 vehicles (7 sets)
- Formation: 6 cars per trainset
- Capacity: 922 passengers
- Operators: Seibu
- Lines served: Seibu Kokubunji Line

Specifications
- Car body construction: Steel
- Car length: 20,000 mm (65 ft 7 in)
- Width: 2,900 mm (9 ft 6 in)
- Height: 4,145 mm (13 ft 7 in)
- Doors: 4 pairs per side
- Traction system: Variable frequency (IGBT)
- Power output: 190 kW x4 per motored car
- Electric system(s): 1,500 V DC (overhead)
- Current collection: Pantograph
- Braking system(s): Regenerative braking
- Track gauge: 1,067 mm (3 ft 6 in)

The Seibu 8000 series (西武8000系) is a commuter electric multiple unit (EMU) train type operated by the private railway operator Seibu Railway in Japan since end of May 2025.

== History ==
=== Background ===
On 26 September 2023, Seibu Railway announced that, to replace ageing railcars with DC traction equipment, it would be inheriting approximately 100 variable-frequency-controlled railcars from Tokyu Railways and Odakyu Electric Railway between 2024 and 2029. These cars are according referred to by Seibu as "sustainable trains". Seibu estimated that operating the reused railcars would reduce carbon dioxide (CO_{2}) emissions by 5,700 tonnes per year.

=== Inheritance by Seibu Railway ===
One Odakyu 8000 series 6-car set was transferred to Seibu in May 2024. On 26 September of that year, Seibu announced the ex-Odakyu fleet would receive the designation "8000 series" (8000系), inheriting the type's original designation (8000形).

Seibu originally intended for the 8000 series to enter service at the end of fiscal 2024; however, their introduction was deferred to 31 May 2025.

The 8000 series received the 2025 Good Design Award.

== Operations ==
The 8000 series is used on Kokubunji Line services. A total of seven sets are planned for introduction to replace the 2000 series sets used on the Kokubunji Line.

== Formation ==
Sets are formed as shown below:

	← Seibu-Shinjuku, Kokubunji					
Car No.	1	2	3	4	5	6
Designation	Tc1	M1	T1	M3	M4	Tc2
Numbering	8100	8200	8300	8800	8900	8000
Capacity (total/seated)	147/45	157/54	157/54	157/54	157/54	147/45
Weight (t)	31.0	39.8	33.6	40.3	39.3	31.2

- Cars 2 and 4 have a pantograph.
- Cars 1 and 6 have a wheelchair space.
