= Seibu Kokubunji Line =

Railway line in Tokyo, Japan

Kokubunji Line
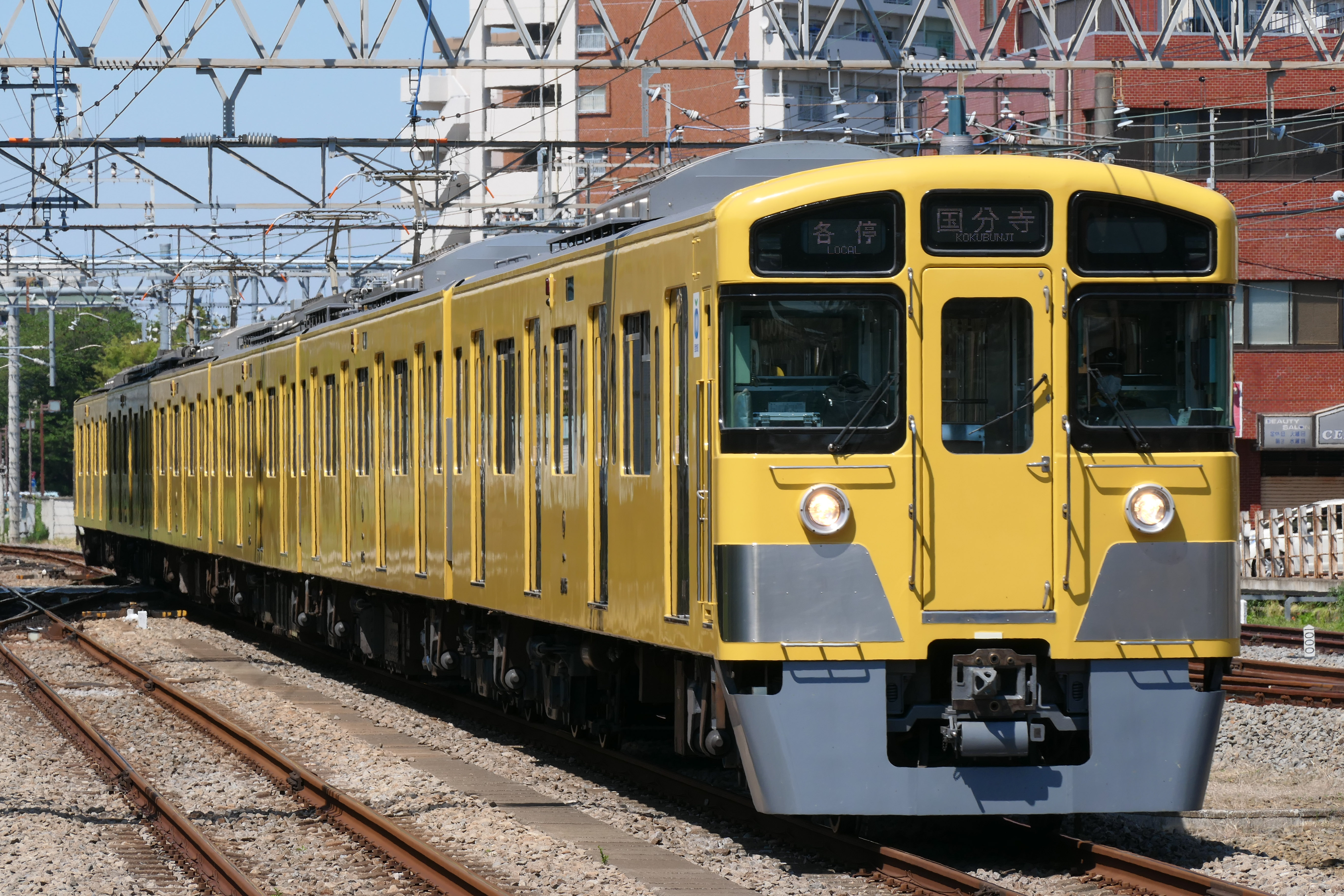
- A 2000 series train on the Kokubunji Line in April 2021

Overview
- Native name: 国分寺線
- Owner: Seibu Railway
- Locale: Kanto region
- Termini: Kokubunji; Higashi-Murayama
- Stations: 5

Service
- Type: Commuter rail
- System: Seibu Shinjuku
- Services: 1
- Rolling stock: Seibu 2000 series, Seibu 8000 series

History
- Opened: 21 December 1894; 131 years ago

Technical
- Line length: 7.8 km (4.8 mi)
- Number of tracks: 1 (1.2 km double-tracked)
- Track gauge: 1,067 mm (3 ft 6 in)
- Electrification: 1,500 V DC (overhead catenary)
- Operating speed: 85 km/h (53 mph)
- Highest elevation: 300 m (980 ft)

The Kokubunji Line (国分寺線, Seibu Kokubunji-sen) is a railway line in Tokyo, Japan, operated by the private railway operator Seibu Railway.

The line is part of the Seibu Shinjuku group of railway lines and connects suburban areas of western Tokyo to Seibu and JR main lines that run to central Tokyo. The line passes through the cities of Higashimurayama, Kodaira, and Kokubunji.

== History ==
The line was opened in 1894 as part of the Kawagoe Railway linking Kokubunji and Hon-Kawagoe. At this time, Ogawa was the only intermediate station on the Higashi-Murayama to Kokubunji section. In 1927, the Kawagoe railway was diverted at Higashi-Murayama to a new section of track to Takadanobaba and so the Kokubunji line was formed from the orphaned section. The line was electrified in 1948. Two additional intermediate stations were later opened between Ogawa and Kokubunji: Takanodai opened in 1948, and Koigakubo opened in 1955. Setting up of Hanesawa and track doubling from Koigakubo to Hanesawa was carried out in 1968. Since July 2008, recorded announcements on trains have been provided in English in addition to Japanese.

Through service onto the Seibu Shinjuku Line has been suspended since 19 March 2019 because of the reconstruction of Higashi-Murayama Station into an elevated station.

On 31 May 2025, Seibu 8000 series trains entered service on the Kokubunji Line to replace the Seibu 2000 series. They are converted from Odakyu 8000 series trains.

== Stations ==
No.	Station		Distance (km)	Connections	Location	
	Kokubunji	国分寺	0.0	Tamako Line; Chūō Line	Kokubunji	Tokyo
	Koigakubo	恋ヶ窪	2.1		Kokubunji	Tokyo
	Takanodai	鷹の台	3.6		Kodaira	Tokyo
	Ogawa	小川	5.1	Haijima Line	Kodaira	Tokyo
	Higashi-Murayama	東村山	7.8	Shinjuku Line; Seibuen Line	Higashimurayama	Tokyo

== Operations ==
2000 series EMUs are used on this line. These trains are painted in Seibu Railway's distinctive yellow livery. All trains are local services and stop at all stations. Trains take 12 minutes to complete the 7.8 km (4.8 mi) journey. The line is mostly single track between Higashi-Murayama and Koigakubo, but with double track sections at each station. Track between Koigakubo and Kokubunji is double track for the first 1.2 km (0.75 mi) and single track the last 0.9 km (0.6 mi) before Kokubunji station. The track changes from double to single at Hanesawa (羽根沢信号場, Hanesawa shingōjō). The 1.2 km (0.75 mi) double-track section allows 8 trains per hour to operate in each direction during peak. At Kokubunji Station, trains use only a single platform (platform 5) at the terminus.
