= Shiraume Gakuen University =

University in Tokyo, Japan

Coordinates: 35°43′31.2″N 139°27′3.4″E

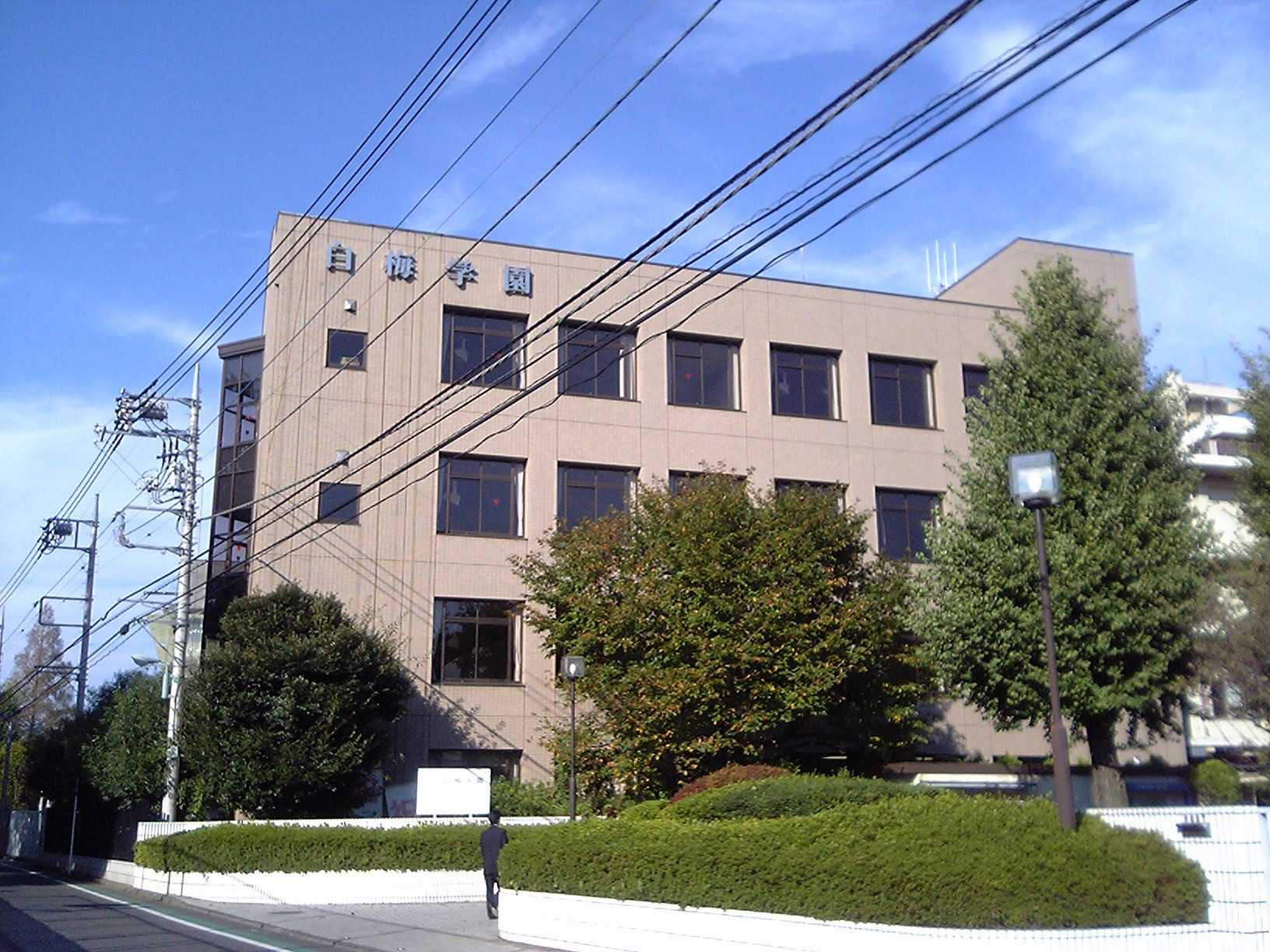
Shiraume Gakuen University

Shiraume Gakuen University (白梅学園大学, Siraume gakuen daigaku) is a private university in Kodaira, Tokyo, Japan, established in 2005. The predecessor of the school was founded in 1942. The foundation that operates the school also operates a separate institution called Shiraume Gakuen Junior College.
