= Seibuen Station =

Railway station in Higashimurayama, Tokyo, Japan

SK06 Seibuen Station 西武園駅
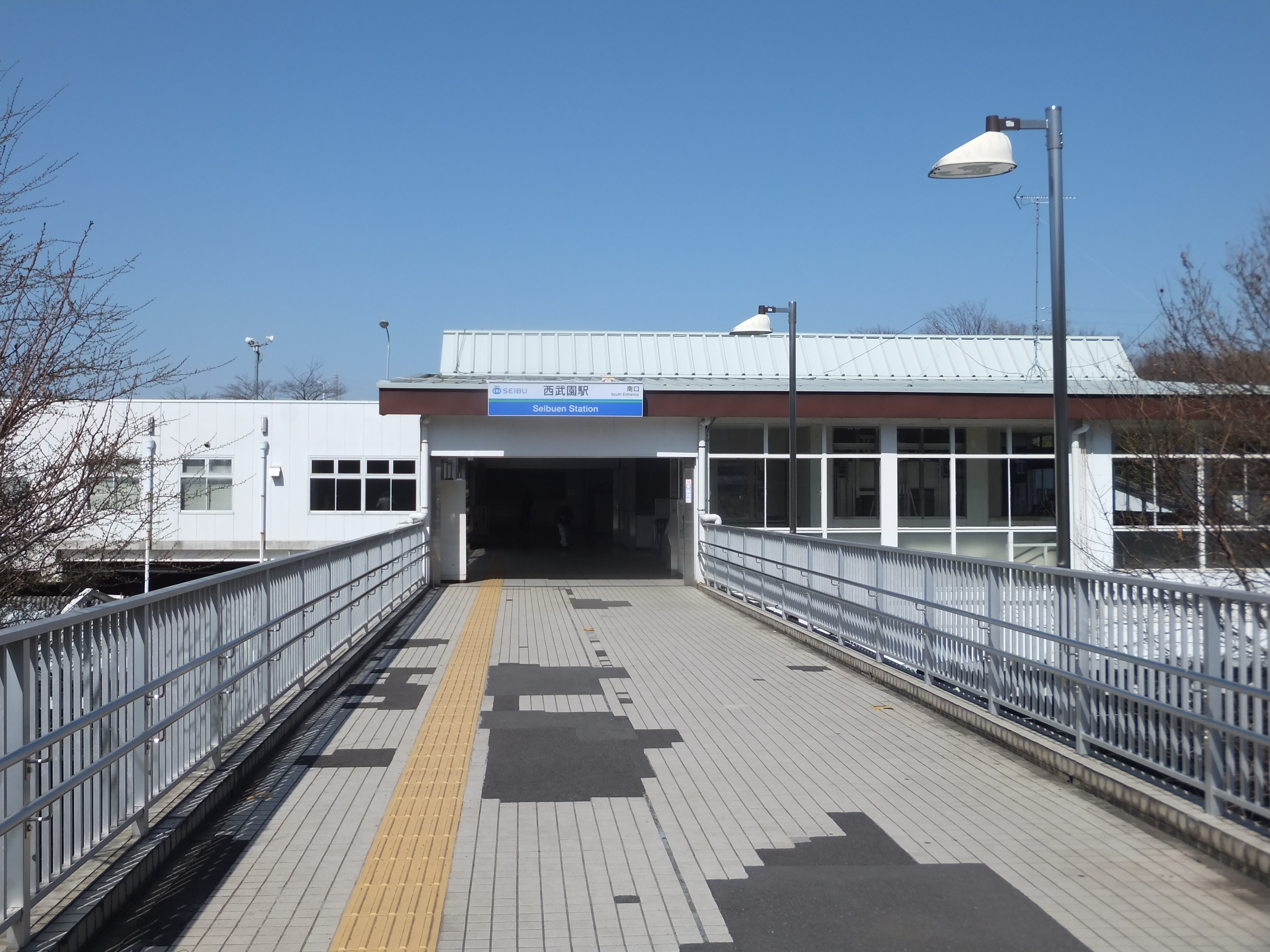
- Seibuen Station south exit (March 2016)

General information
- Location: 4-29-1 Tamako-cho, Higashimurayama-shi, Tokyo 189-0026; Japan
- Coordinates: 35.7674°N 139.4490°E
- Operator: Seibu Railway
- Line: Seibuen Line
- Distance: 2.4 km from Higashi-Murayama
- Platforms: 1 side + 1 island platform
- Connections: Bus stop

Other information
- Station code: SK06
- Website: Official website

History
- Opened: 5 April 1930
- Former names: Murayama Chosuichi-mae Station (to 1941); Sayama Kōen Station (to 1944); Murayama Chosuichi Station (to 1950)

Passengers
- FY2019: 3591

Services
Preceding station	Seibu Railway	Following station
Terminus	Seibuen Line	Higashi-Murayama SK05 Terminus
Location
- Location within Tokyo Location within Japan

Seibuen Station (西武園駅, Seibuen-eki) is a passenger railway station located in the city of Higashimurayama, Tokyo, Japan, operated by the private railway operator Seibu Railway. The station provides direct access to Seibu Yuenchi Amusement Park and Seibu-en Velodrome.

== Lines ==
Seibuen Station is the terminus of the Seibuen Line, a 2.4 kilometer spur line from Higashi-Murayama Station.

== Station layout ==
The station has one terminating side platform and one terminating island platform. Both platforms are ground-level and are connected by a footbridge.

=== Platforms ===
1-3	Seibu Seibuen Line	for Higashi-Murayama

== History ==
The station opened on 5 April 1930 as Murayama Chosuichi-mae Station (村山貯水池前駅). It was renamed Sayama Kōen Station (狭山公園駅) on 1 March 1941. The station was closed on 10 May 1944, reopening on 1 April 1948 as Murayama Chosuichi Station (村山貯水池駅). It was renamed to its present name on 23 May 1950. The station was relocated 400 meters north to its present location on 20 September 1961, and was renamed to its present name on 25 March 1975. A new station building was completed in July 1990.

Station numbering was introduced on all Seibu Railway lines during fiscal 2012, with Seibuen Station becoming "SK06".

== Passenger statistics ==
In fiscal 2019, the station was the 81st busiest on the Seibu network with an average of 3,591 passengers daily.

The passenger figures for previous years are as shown below.

Fiscal year	Daily average
2005	4,095
2010	4,053
2015	3,863

== Surrounding area ==
- Seibu-en Velodrome
- Seibu-en

== See also ==
- List of railway stations in Japan
