= Kodaira, Tokyo =

Kodaira 小平市
- City
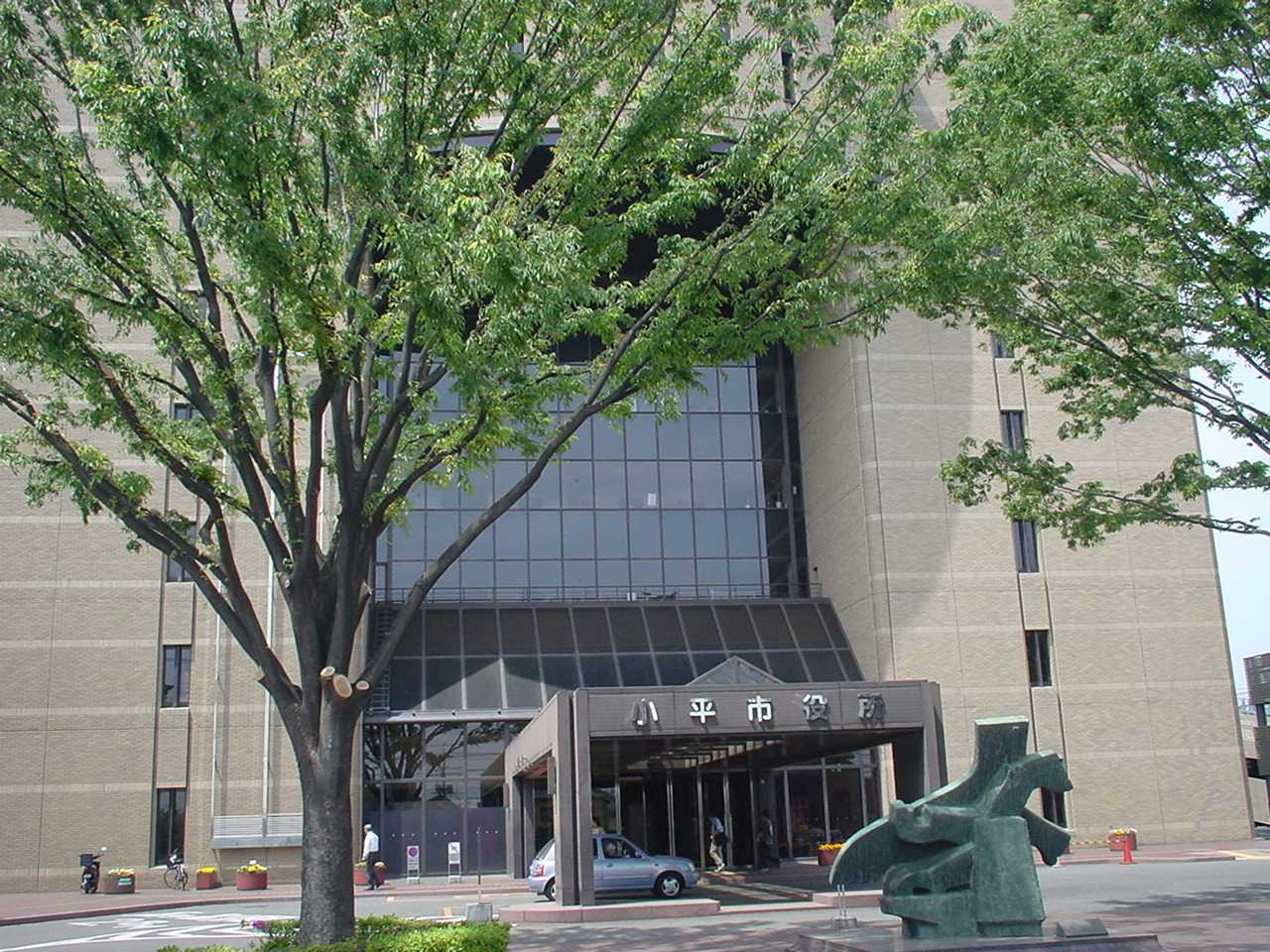
- Kodaira City Hall

- Flag Seal

- Location of Kodaira in Tokyo

- Coordinates: 35°43′42.6″N 139°28′38.8″E
- Country: Japan
- Region: Kantō
- Prefecture: Tokyo

Government
  - Mayor: Yōko Kobayashi (since April 2021)

Area
  - Total: 20.51 km^{2} (7.92 sq mi)

Population (April 2021)
  - Total: 195,207
  - Density: 9,518/km^{2} (24,650/sq mi)
- Time zone: UTC+9 (Japan Standard Time)
- Symbols
  - Tree: Zelkova serrata
  - Flower: Azalea
  - Bird: Japanese pygmy woodpecker
- Phone number: 042-341-1211
- Address: 2-1333 Ogawa, Kodaira-shi, Tokyo 187-8701
- Website: Official website

Kodaira (小平市, Kodaira-shi) is a city located in the western portion of the Tokyo Metropolis, Japan. As of 1 April 2021, the city had an estimated population of 195,207 in 93,654 households, and a population density of 9500 persons per km^{2}. The total area of the city was 20.51 square kilometres (7.92 sq mi).

== Geography ==
Kodaira is located in the Musashino Terrace near the geographic centre of Tokyo Metropolis.

=== Surrounding municipalities ===
Tokyo Metropolis

- Higashiyamato
- Higashimurayama
- Higashikurume
- Koganei
- Kokubunji
- Nishitokyo
- Tachikawa

=== Climate ===
Kodaira has a humid subtropical climate (Köppen Cfa) characterized by warm summers and cool winters with light to no snowfall. The average annual temperature in Kodaira is 14.0 °C. The average annual rainfall is 1647 mm with September as the wettest month. The temperatures are highest on average in August, at around 25.5 °C, and lowest in January, at around 2.6 °C.

== Demographics ==
Per Japanese census data, the population of Kodaira increased rapidly in the 1950s and 1960s and has continued to grow at a slower rate in the decades since.

Historical population
Year	Pop.	±%
1920	6,068	—
1930	6,558	+8.1%
1940	8,674	+32.3%
1950	21,659	+149.7%
1960	52,923	+144.3%
1970	137,373	+159.6%
1980	154,610	+12.5%
1990	164,013	+6.1%
2000	178,623	+8.9%
2010	187,035	+4.7%
2020	198,739	+6.3%

== History ==
The area of present-day Kodaira was part of ancient Musashi Province, but was a largely unpopulated area under the opening of the Tamagawa Aqueduct in the Edo period made agriculture possible. In the post-Meiji Restoration cadastral reform of July 22, 1878, the area became part of Kitatama District in Kanagawa Prefecture. The village of Kodaira was created on April 1, 1889, with the establishment of the modern municipalities system. Kitatama District was transferred to the administrative control of Tokyo Metropolis on April 1, 1893. The population of the area expanded after the 1923 Great Kantō earthquake with the relocation of universities and housing areas from central Tokyo. Kodaira was elevated to town status in 1944 and to city status on October 1, 1962.

== Government ==
Kodaira has a mayor-council form of government with a directly elected mayor and a unicameral city council of 28 members. Kodaira contributes two members to the Tokyo Metropolitan Assembly. In terms of national politics, the city is part of Tokyo 18th district of the lower house of the Diet of Japan. The current mayor is Yoko Kobayashi(ja:小林洋子)(since April 11, 2021).

== Education ==
=== Universities ===
- Tsuda College
- Kaetsu University
- Musashino Art University
- Hitotsubashi University (Kodaira campus)
- Shiraume Gakuen College
- Shiraume Gakuen Junior College

=== Primary and secondary schools ===
The Tokyo Metropolitan Government Board of Education operates three public high schools. There is also one special education school for the handicapped.

- Kodaira High School
- Kodaira Minami High School
- Kodaira Nishi High School

Kodaira has 19 public elementary school and eight public junior high schools.

Public junior high schools:

- Hana Koganei Minami (花小金井南中学校)
- Josui (上水中学校)
- Kodaira No. 1 (小平第一中学校)
- Kodaira No. 2 (小平第二中学校)
- Kodaira No. 3 (小平第三中学校)
- Kodaira No. 4 (小平第四中学校)
- Kodaira No. 5 (小平第五中学校)
- Kodaira No. 6 (小平第六中学校)

Public elementary schools:

- Gakuen Higashi (学園東小学校)
- Hana Koganei (花小金井小学校)
- Kamijuku (上宿小学校)
- Kodaira No. 1 (小平第一小学校)
- Kodaira No. 2 (小平第二小学校)
- Kodaira No. 3 (小平第三小学校)
- Kodaira No. 4 (小平第四小学校)
- Kodaira No. 5 (小平第五小学校)
- Kodaira No. 6 (小平第六小学校)
- Kodaira No. 7 (小平第七小学校)
- Kodaira No. 8 (小平第八小学校)
- Kodaira No. 9 (小平第九小学校)
- Kodaira No. 10 (小平第十小学校)
- Kodaira No. 11 (小平第十一小学校)
- Kodaira No. 12 (小平第十二小学校)
- Kodaira No. 13 (小平第十三小学校)
- Kodaira No. 14 (小平第十四小学校)
- Kodaira No. 15 (小平第十五小学校)
- Suzuki (鈴木小学校)

There are two private elementary schools, three private junior high schools, and three private high schools.

- Soka Junior and Senior High School
- Kinjo High School
- Shiraume Gakuen High School
- Salesians of Don Bosco Salesian Primary and Junior High School (サレジオ小学校・中学校)
- Tokyo Soka Elementary School

=== Miscellaneous school ===
- Korea University

== Transportation ==
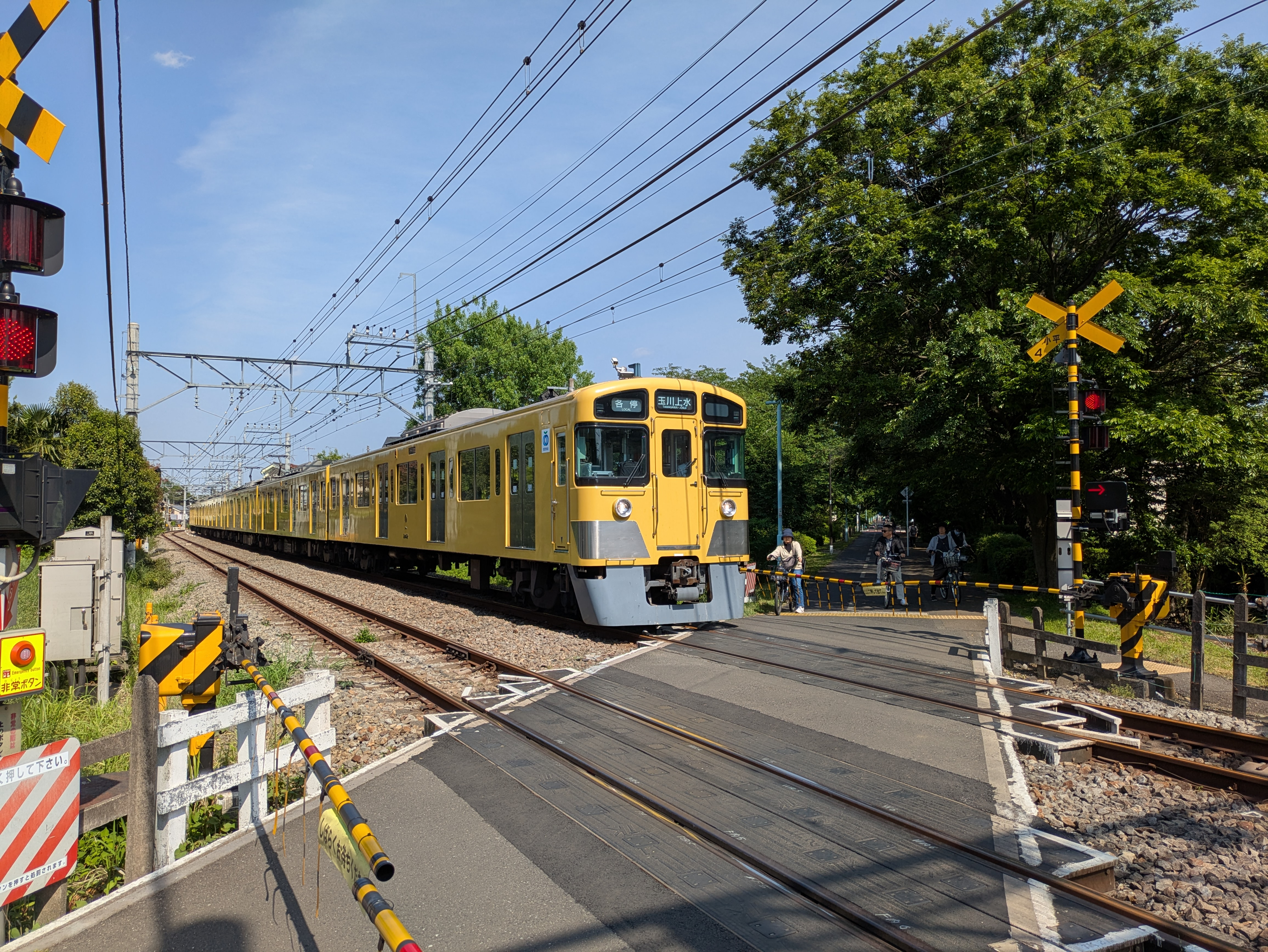
Tama Lake Cycling Road crossing and Seibu Haijima Line（2025）

=== Railway ===
JR East – Musashino Line

- Shin-Kodaira

Seibu Railway - Seibu Shinjuku Line

- Hana-Koganei - Kodaira

Seibu Railway - Seibu Tamako Line

- Hitotsubashi-Gakuen - Ōmekaidō

Seibu Railway - Seibu Kokubunji Line

- Takanodai - Ogawa

Seibu Railway - Seibu Haijima Line

- Kodaira - <Hagiyama> - Ogawa

=== Highway ===
Kodaira is not served by any national highways or expressways.

== Local attractions ==
- Koganei Park
- Edo-Tokyo Open Air Architectural Museum
- Kodaira Municipal Cemetery
- Kodaiara Hirakushi Denchu Art Museum
- Gas Museum
- Mayoi no Sakura, a cherry tree

== Notable people from Kodaira ==
- Ryuhei Kawada, politician
- Nobuaki Kojima, contemporary sculptor
- Shun Oguri, actor
- Kōji Tsujitani, voice actor
