= Seibu Seibuen Line =

Railway line in Japan operated by Seibu railway

Seibuen Line
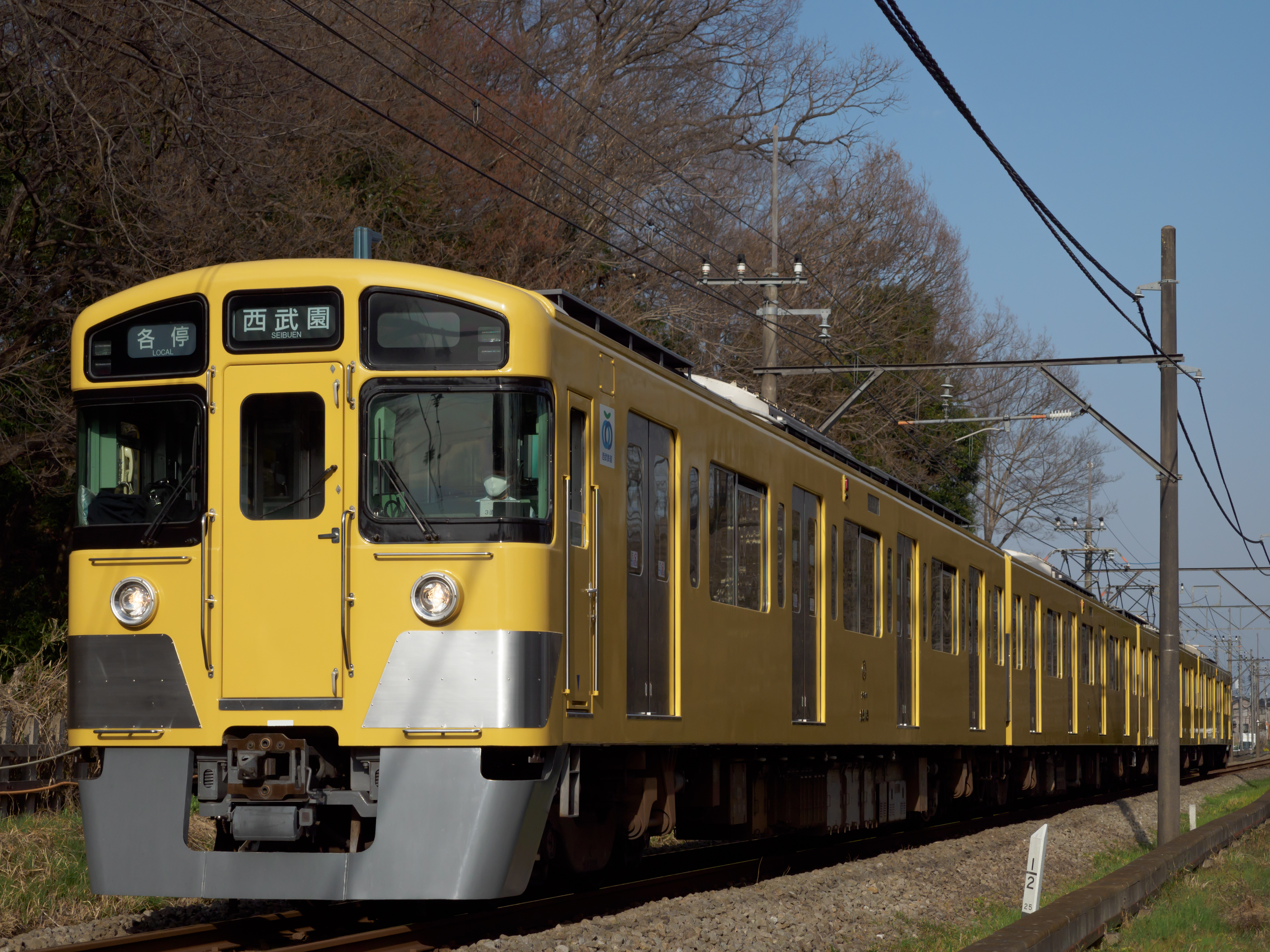
- A 2000 series EMU on the Seibuen Line

Overview
- Native name: 西武園線
- Owner: Seibu Railway
- Locale: Tokyo
- Termini: Higashi-Murayama; Seibuen
- Stations: 2

Service
- Type: Commuter rail
- Operator(s): Seibu Railway

History
- Opened: 5 April 1930; 96 years ago

Technical
- Line length: 2.4 km (1.5 mi)
- Number of tracks: 1
- Track gauge: 1,067 mm (3 ft 6 in)
- Minimum radius: 300 m
- Electrification: 1,500 V DC, overhead catenary
- Operating speed: 90 km/h (55 mph)
- Highest elevation: 16.7‰

The Seibuen Line (西武園線, Seibuen-sen) is a Japanese commuter railway line operated by the Seibu Railway, a major private railroad in Tokyo. The single-track line connects Higashi-Murayama Station and Seibuen Station, both located in Higashimurayama, Tokyo.

== Stations ==
Both stations are located in Higashimurayama, Tokyo.

No.	Station name	Japanese	Distance (km)	Transfers
	Higashi-Murayama	東村山	0.0	Shinjuku Line; Kokubunji Line
	Seibuen	西武園	2.4	

== History ==
The line was opened on 5 April 1930.
