= Kokubunji, Tokyo =

Kokubunji 国分寺市
- City
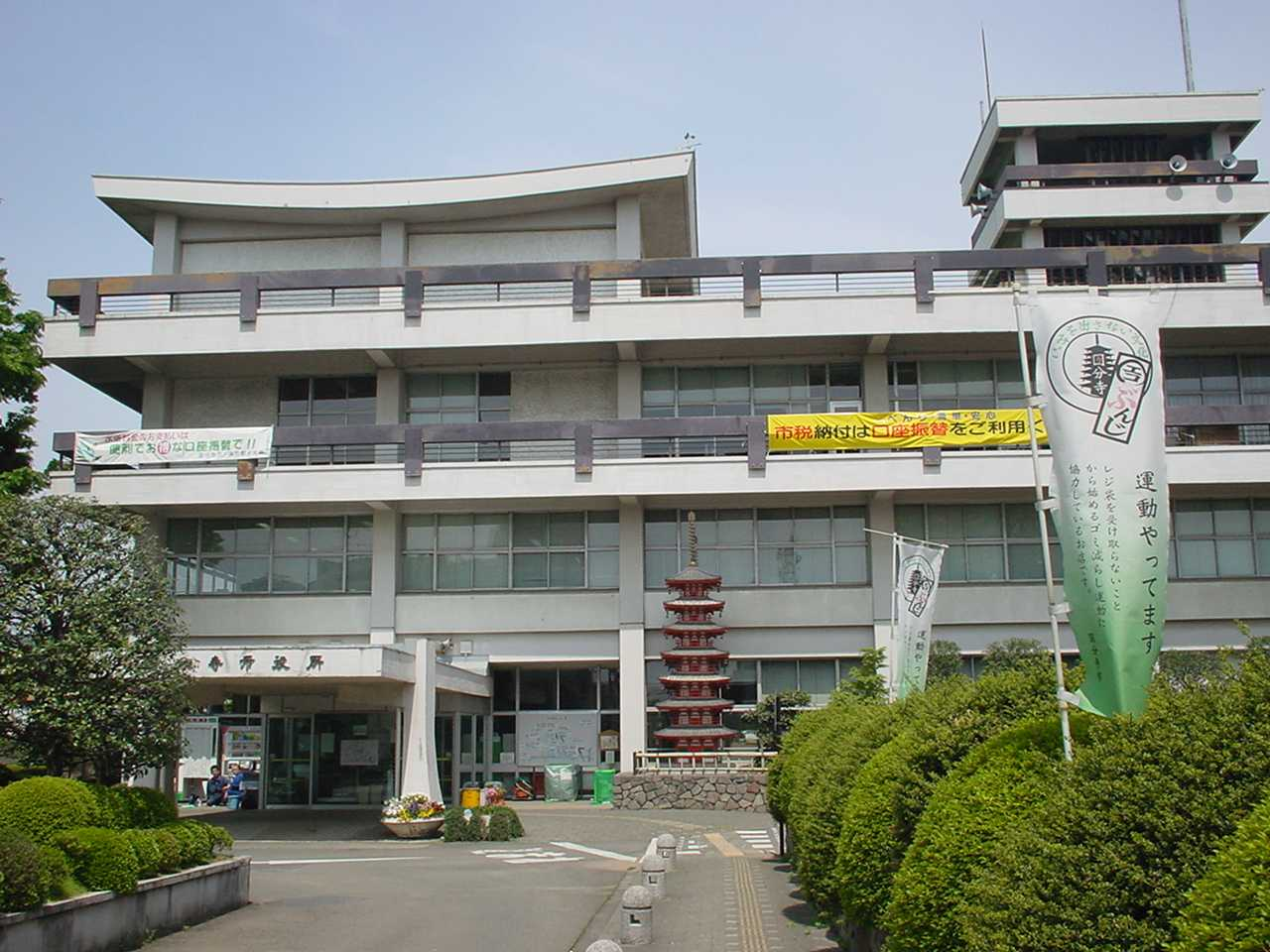
- Kokubunji City Hall

- Flag Seal

- Location of Kokubunji in Tokyo

- Coordinates: 35°42′39.4″N 139°27′43.8″E
- Country: Japan
- Region: Kantō
- Prefecture: Tokyo
- First official record: 741 AD (official)
- Town settled: December 11, 1940
- City settled: November 3, 1964

Government
  - Mayor: Teppei Maruyama (since July 2025)

Area
  - Total: 11.46 km^{2} (4.42 sq mi)

Population (March 2021)
  - Total: 126,791
  - Density: 11,060/km^{2} (28,660/sq mi)
- Time zone: UTC+9 (Japan Standard Time)
- Symbols
  - Tree: Zelkova serrata
  - Flower: Satsuki azalea
- Phone number: 042-325-0111
- Address: 1-6-1 Tokura, Kokubunji-shi, Tokyo 185-8501
- Website: Official website

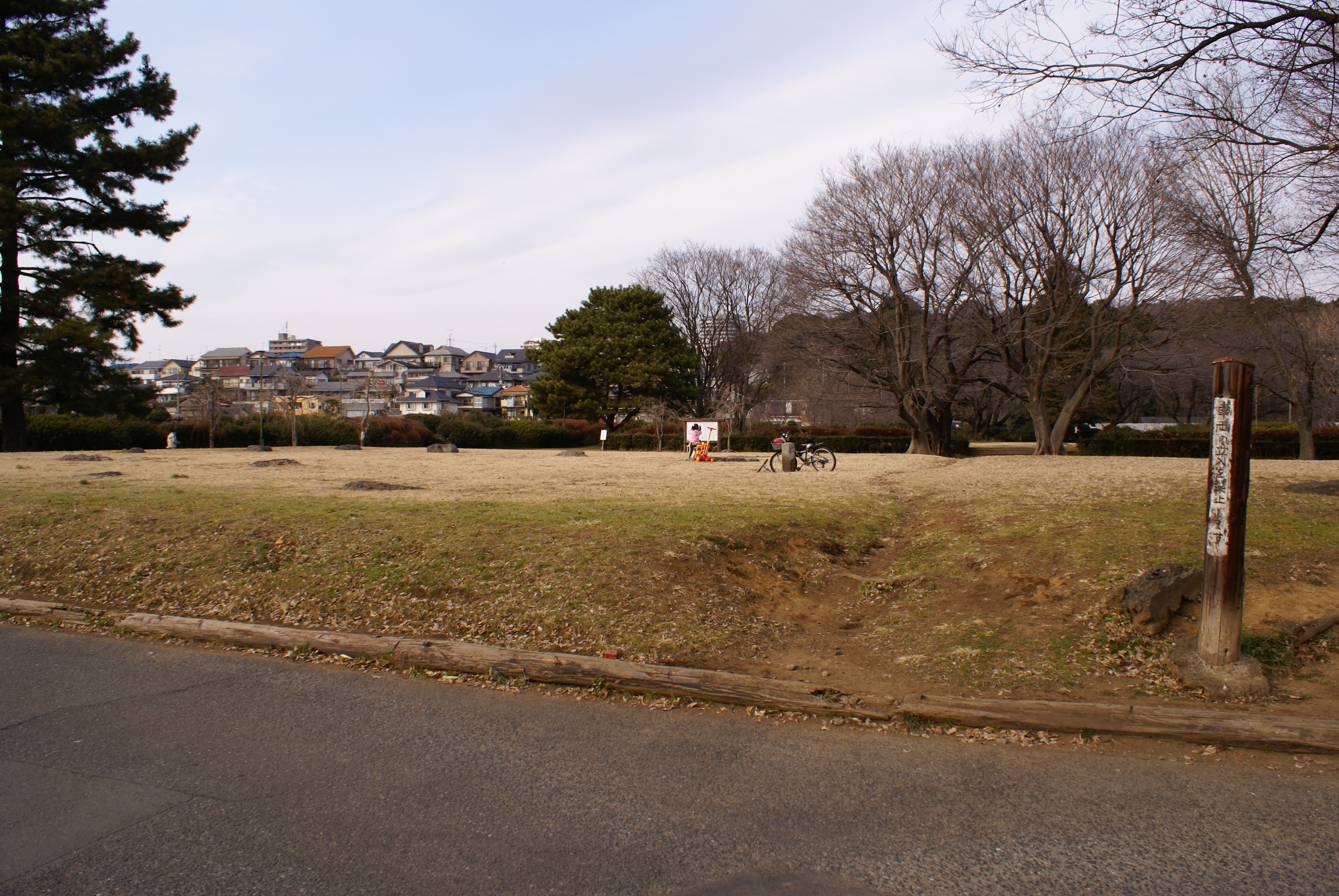
Ruins of Musashi Kokubun-ji temple

Kokubunji (国分寺市, Kokubunji-shi; Japanese pronunciation: [kò̞.kɯ̈́.bɯ̈́ɲ̟́.ɟ̟͡ʑí(.ɕì)]) is a city located in the western portion of the Tokyo Metropolis, Japan. As of 1 March 2021, the city had an estimated population of 126,791, and a population density of 11,000 persons per km^{2}. The total area of the city was 11.46 square kilometres (4.42 sq mi).

== Geography ==
Kokubunji is located on the Musashino Terrace of western Tokyo, approximately in the geographic center of the Tokyo Metropolis. The city extends for about 5.68 kilometers east-to-west by about 3.86 kilometers north-to-south.

=== Surrounding municipalities ===
Tokyo Metropolis

- Fuchū
- Kodaira
- Koganei
- Kunitachi
- Tachikawa

=== Climate ===
Kokubunji has a humid subtropical climate (Köppen Cfa) characterized by warm summers and cool winters with light to no snowfall. The average annual temperature in Kokubunji is 14.0 °C. The average annual rainfall is 1647 mm, with September as the wettest month. The temperatures are highest on average in August (at around 25.5 °C) and lowest in January (at around 2.6 °C).

== Demographics ==
Per Japanese census data, the population of Kokubunji increased rapidly in the 1950s and 1960s and has continued to grow at a slower rate since then.

Historical population
Year	Pop.	±%
1920	4,618	—
1930	6,454	+39.8%
1940	9,324	+44.5%
1950	19,125	+105.1%
1960	39,098	+104.4%
1970	81,259	+107.8%
1980	91,010	+12.0%
1990	100,982	+11.0%
2000	111,404	+10.3%
2010	120,650	+8.3%
2020	129,242	+7.1%

== History ==
The area of present-day Kokubunji was part of ancient Musashi Province, and was the site of the Nara period Provincial temple of that province. In the post-Meiji Restoration cadastral reform of 1878, the area became part of Kitatama District in Kanagawa Prefecture. The village of Kokubunji was created on April 1, 1889, with the establishment of the modern municipalities system. Kitatama District was transferred to the administrative control of Tokyo Metropolis on April 1, 1893. Kokubunji was elevated to town status in 1940, and to city status on November 3, 1964.

== Government ==
Kokubunji has a mayor-council form of government with a directly elected mayor and a unicameral city council of 22 members. Kokubunji, together with the city of Kunitachi, contributes two members to the Tokyo Metropolitan Assembly. In terms of national politics, the city is part of Tokyo 19th district of the lower house of the Diet of Japan.

== Economy ==
Kokubunji is the home of the Hitachi Central Research Laboratory, which contains one of the largest natural preserves in the area surrounding Tokyo. The Railway Technical Research Institute, the technical research company under the Japan Railways group of companies is also located in Kokubunji.

== Education ==
The city has one public high school, Kokubunji High School, which is operated by the Tokyo Metropolitan Government Board of Education.

Kokubunji has ten public elementary schools and five public middle schools.

Municipal junior high schools:

- No. 1 (第一中学校)
- No. 2 (第二中学校)
- No. 3 (第三中学校)
- No. 4 (第四中学校)
- No. 5 (第五中学校)

Municipal elementary schools:

- No. 1 (第一小学校)
- No. 2 (第二小学校)
- No. 3 (第三小学校)
- No. 4 (第四小学校)
- No. 5 (第五小学校)
- No. 6 (第六小学校)
- No. 7 (第七小学校)
- No. 8 (第八小学校)
- No. 9 (第九小学校)
- No. 10 (第十小学校)

There is also one private K-12 school, affiliated with Waseda University: Waseda Jitsugyo Primary, Junior High, and Senior High School.

Tokyo Keizai University has a campus at Kokubunji.

== Transportation ==
=== Railway ===
JR East – Chūō Main Line

- Kokubunji - Nishi-Kokubunji

JR East – Musashino Line

- Nishi-Kokubunji

Seibu Railway - Seibu Kokubunji Line

- Kokubunji - Koigakubo

Seibu Railway - Seibu Tamako Line

- Kokubunji

=== Highway ===
- Kokubunji is not served by any national highways or expressways.

== Sister cities ==
- Marion, South Australia, Australia

== Local attractions ==
- Site of Musashi kokubunji
- Tonogayato Garden
