= Mayoi no Sakura =

Japanese cherry tree in Kodaira, Tokyo

Coordinates: 35°44′38″N 139°28′01″E

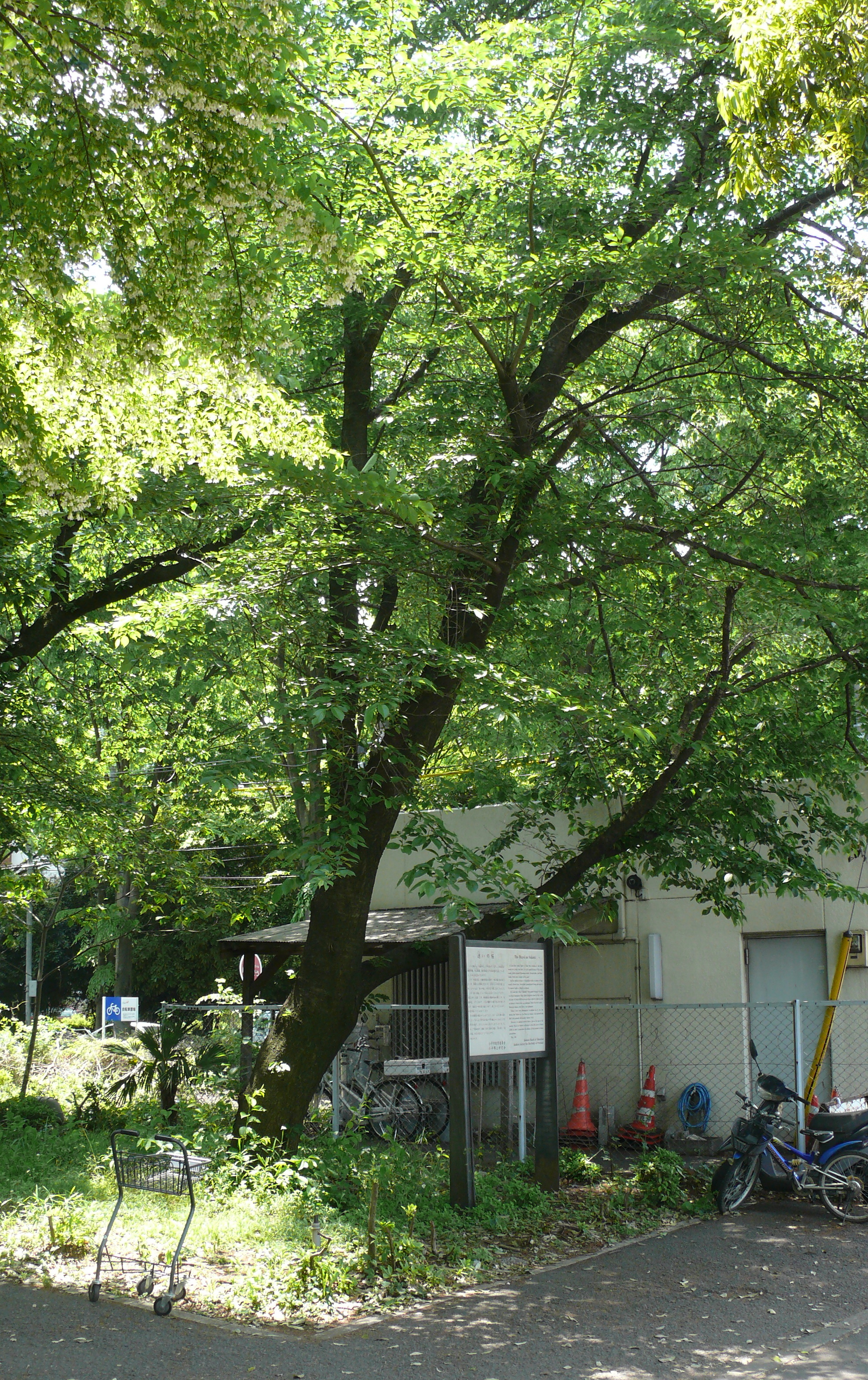
The Mayoi no Sakura tree, May 2010

The Guidepost Cherry Tree (迷いの桜, Mayoi no Sakura) is a Japanese cherry tree in Kodaira, Tokyo, Japan originally planted by Nitta Yoshisada in the year 1333.

== History ==
Tradition has it that in the year 1333 when Nitta Yoshisada was conducting the Kōzuke-Musashi Campaign and on his way to conquer Kamakura, he was leading his army south on the Kamakura Kaido. He came to a Nine Road Crossing (九道の辻, Kudo no Tsuji) and was confused as to which road to take. He is said to have planted a cherry tree to act as a guidepost. Cherry trees were subsequently replanted over the years, the most recent being planted in 1980.
