= Ogawa Station (Tokyo) =

Railway station in Kodaira, Tokyo, Japan

SS31 SK04 Ogawa Station 小川駅
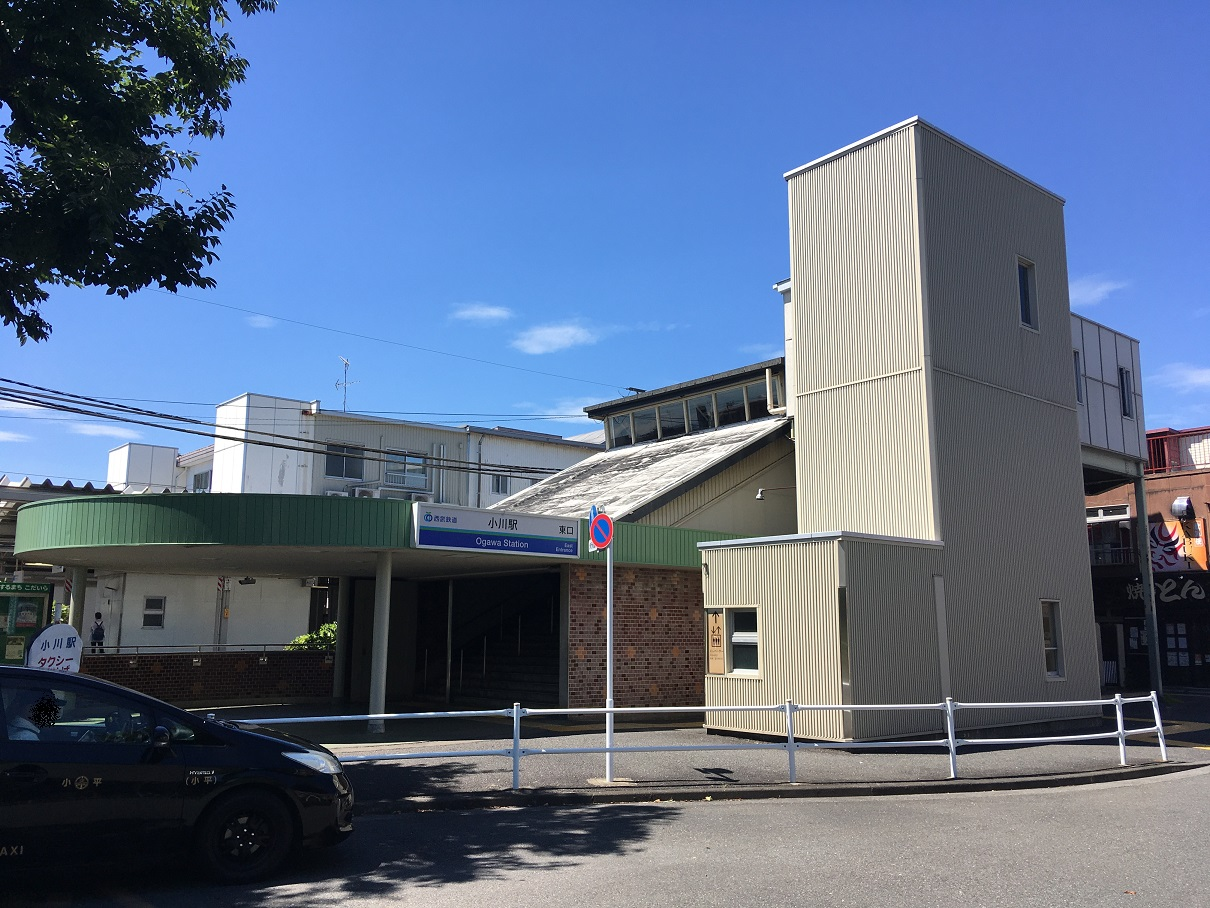
- Ogawa Station East entrance, August 2020

General information
- Location: 1-20-1 Ogawahigashi-chō, Kodaira-shi, Tokyo 187-0031; Japan
- Coordinates: 35°44′15″N 139°27′49″E
- Operator: Seibu Railway
- Lines: Seibu Haijima Line; Seibu Kokubunji Line
- Distance: 25.3 km from Seibu-Shinjuku
- Platforms: 2 island platforms
- Connections: Bus stop

Other information
- Station code: SS31/SK04
- Website: Official website

History
- Opened: 21 December 1894

Passengers
- FY 2019: 29,859 daily

Services
Preceding station	Seibu Railway	Following station
Higashi-Yamatoshi SS32 towards Haijima	Haijima Liner	Hagiyama SS30 towards Seibu-Shinjuku
Higashi-Yamatoshi SS32 towards Haijima	Haijima Line Express Semi Express Local	Hagiyama SS30 towards Kodaira
Higashi-Murayama SK05 Terminus	Kokubunji Line	Takanodai SK03 towards Kokubunji
Location
- Location within Tokyo Location within Japan

Ogawa Station (小川駅, Ogawa-eki) is a junction passenger railway station located in the city of Kodaira, Tokyo, Japan, operated by the private railway operator Seibu Railway.

== Lines ==
Ogawa Station is served by the Seibu Kokubunji Line from Higashi-Murayama to Kokubunji, and by the Seibu Haijima Line from Kodaira to Haijima. It is located 2.7 km from the starting point of the Kokubunji Line at Higashi-Murayama, and 2.8 km from the start of the Haijima Line at Kodaira.

== Station layout ==
The station consists of two ground-level island platforms serving four tracks. The station building is located above the platforms, with entrances on the east and west sides.

=== Platforms ===
1	Seibu Haijima Line	for Kodaira, Takadanobaba, and Seibu-Shinjuku
2	Seibu Kokubunji Line	for Higashi-Murayama
3	Seibu Kokubunji Line	for Kokubunji
4	Seibu Haijima Line	for Haijima

== History ==
Ogawa Station opened on 21 December 1894.

Station numbering was introduced on all Seibu Railway lines during fiscal 2012, with Ogawa Station becoming "SS31" on the Haijima Line and "SK04" on the Kokubunji Line.

== Passenger statistics ==
In fiscal 2019, the station was the 34th busiest on the Seibu network with an average of 29,859 passengers daily.

The passenger figures for previous years are as shown below.

Fiscal year	Daily average
2005	26,950
2010	28,377
2015	28,676

== Surrounding area ==
- Polytechnic University
