= Shiraume Gakuen Junior College =

Coordinates: 35°43′30.9″N 139°27′5.5″E

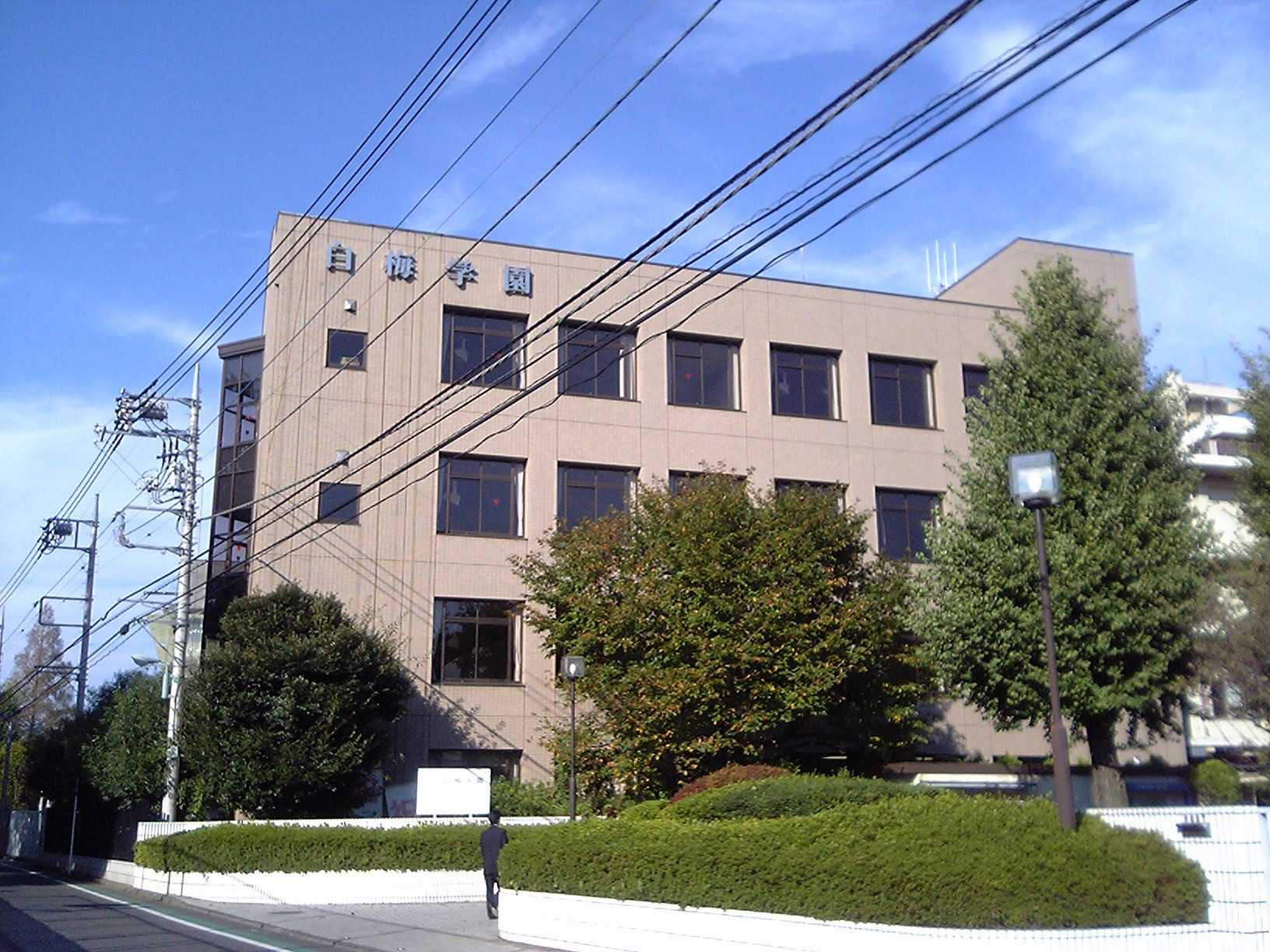
Shiraume Gakuen Junior College in November 2007

Shiraume Gakuen Junior College (白梅学園短期大学, Siraume gakuen tanki daigaku) is a private university in Kodaira, Tokyo, Japan, established in 1957. The predecessor of the school was founded in 1942. The foundation that operates the school also operates a separate four-year college called Shiraume Gakuen College.
