= Kokubunji Station =

Railway station in Kokubunji, Tokyo, Japan

Kokubunji Station 国分寺駅
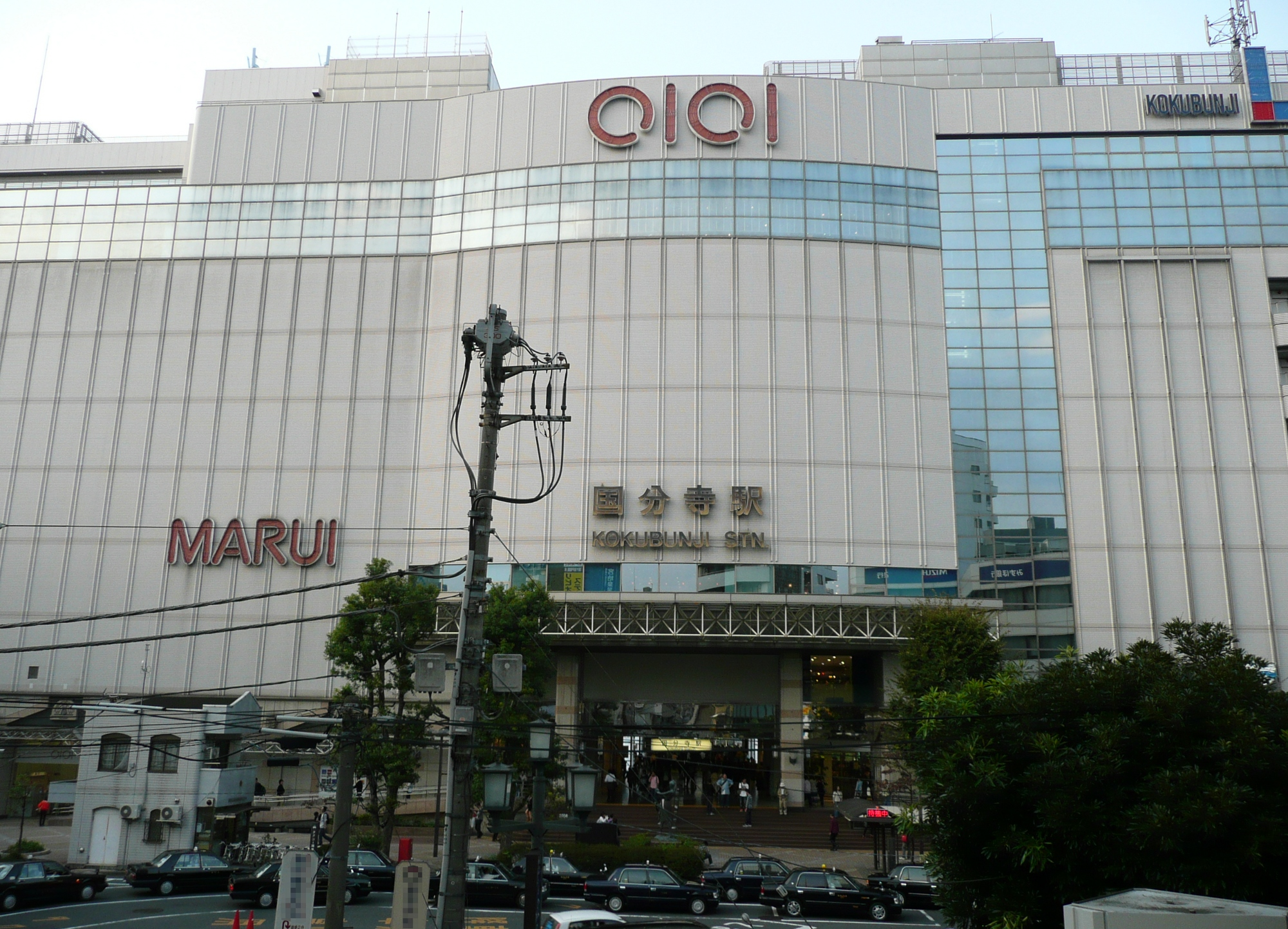
- Kokubunji Station station building, October 2011

Japanese name
- Shinjitai: 国分寺駅
- Kyūjitai: 國分寺驛
- Hiragana: こくぶんじえき

General information
- Location: 2-chome Honmachi, Kokubunji City, Tokyo; Japan
- Coordinates: 35°42′01″N 139°28′49″E
- Operator: JR East; Seibu Railway
- Lines: Chūō Line (Rapid); Seibu Kokubunji Line; Seibu Tamako Line
- Connections: Bus terminal

Construction
- Structure type: At grade

Other information
- Station code: JC16; SK01; ST01

History
- Opened: 11 April 1889; 137 years ago
Location
- Location within Tokyo Location within Kanto Area Location within Japan

Kokubunji Station (国分寺駅, Kokubunji-eki) is an interchange railway station located in the city of Kokubunji, Tokyo, Japan, operated by East Japan Railway Company (JR East) and private railway operator Seibu Railway.

== Lines ==
Kokubunji Station is served by the Chūō Line (Rapid) and is 31.4 kilometers from the terminus of the line at Tokyo. It also forms a terminus for both the Seibu Kokubunji and Seibu Tamako lines.

== Station layout ==
The JR East side of the station consists of two island platforms serving four tracks. The station has a "Midori no Madoguchi" staffed ticket office. The Seibu portion of the station has one side of a former island platform (Platform 5) parallel to and north of the JR platforms. Platform 6 is now closed. Platform 7 is further north again but is above and perpendicular to the other platforms.

=== JR East ===
JC16 Kokubunji Station 国分寺駅
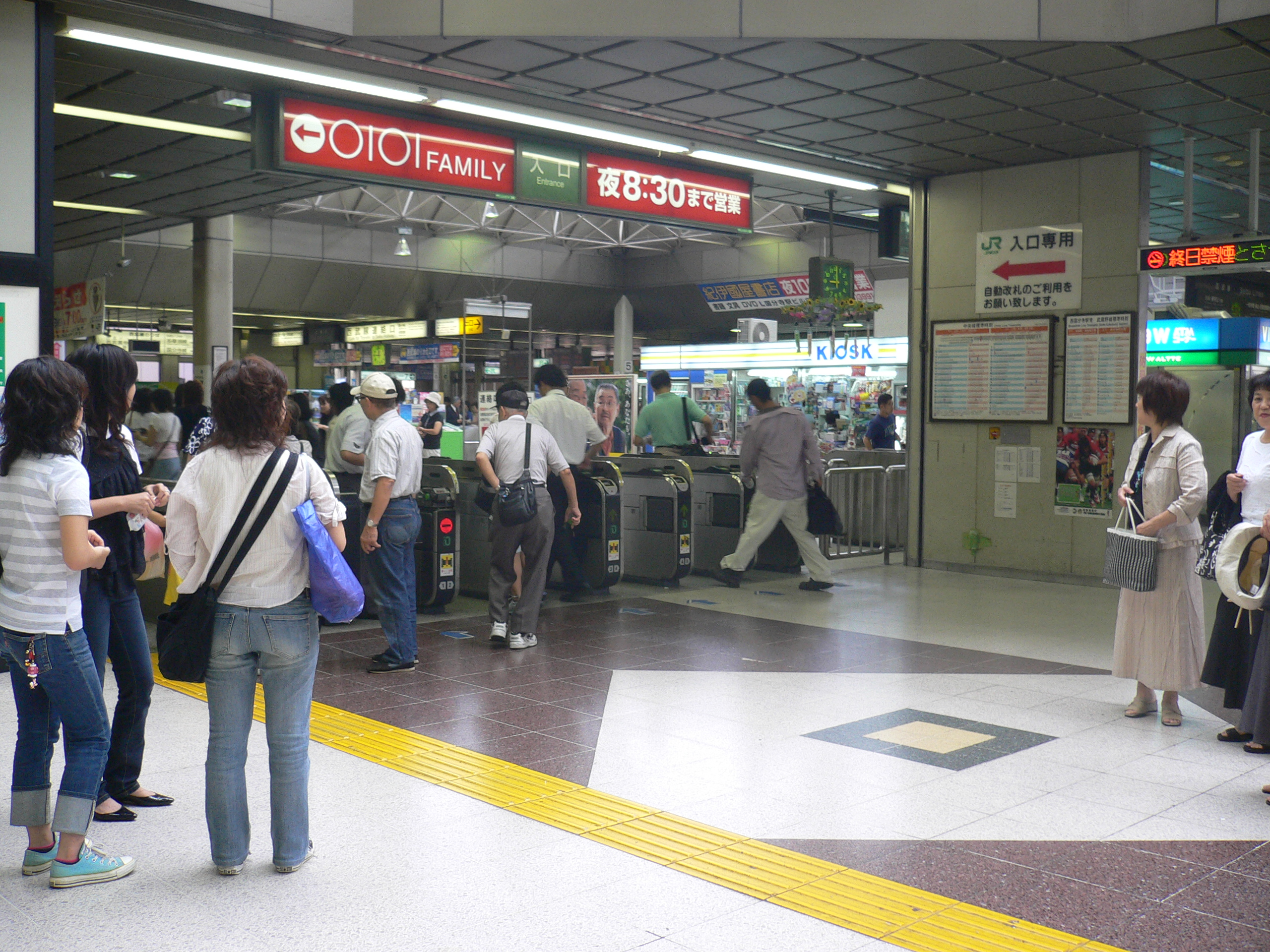
- JR East exit, July 2015

General information
- Location: 2-1-23 Honchō, Kokubunji-shi, Tokyo 185-0021; Japan
- Operator: JR East
- Line: ■ Chūō Line (Rapid)
- Distance: 21.1 km (13.1 mi) from Shinjuku
- Platforms: 2 island platforms
- Tracks: 4

Construction
- Structure type: At grade

Other information
- Status: Staffed ( "Midori no Madoguchi" )
- Station code: JC16

History
- Opened: 11 April 1889; 137 years ago

Passengers
- FY2024: 202,312 (daily) ▲2.18%

Services
Preceding station	JR East	Following station
Tachikawa One-way operation	Chūō Line Commuter Special Rapid	Shinjuku towards Tokyo
Tachikawa JC19 towards Ōtsuki	Chūō Line Chūō Special Rapid	Mitaka JC12 towards Tokyo
Tachikawa JC19 Terminus	Chūō Line Ōme Special Rapid	Mitaka JC12 towards Tokyo
Tachikawa JC19 towards Ōtsuki	Chūō Line Commuter Rapid	Mitaka One-way operation
Nishi-Kokubunji JC17 towards Ōtsuki	Chūō Line Rapid	Musashi-Koganei JC15 towards Tokyo
Location

=== JR Platforms ===
1/2	Chūō Line (Rapid)	for Tachikawa and Hachiōji
3/4	Chūō Line (Rapid)	for Nakano, Shinjuku, and Tokyo

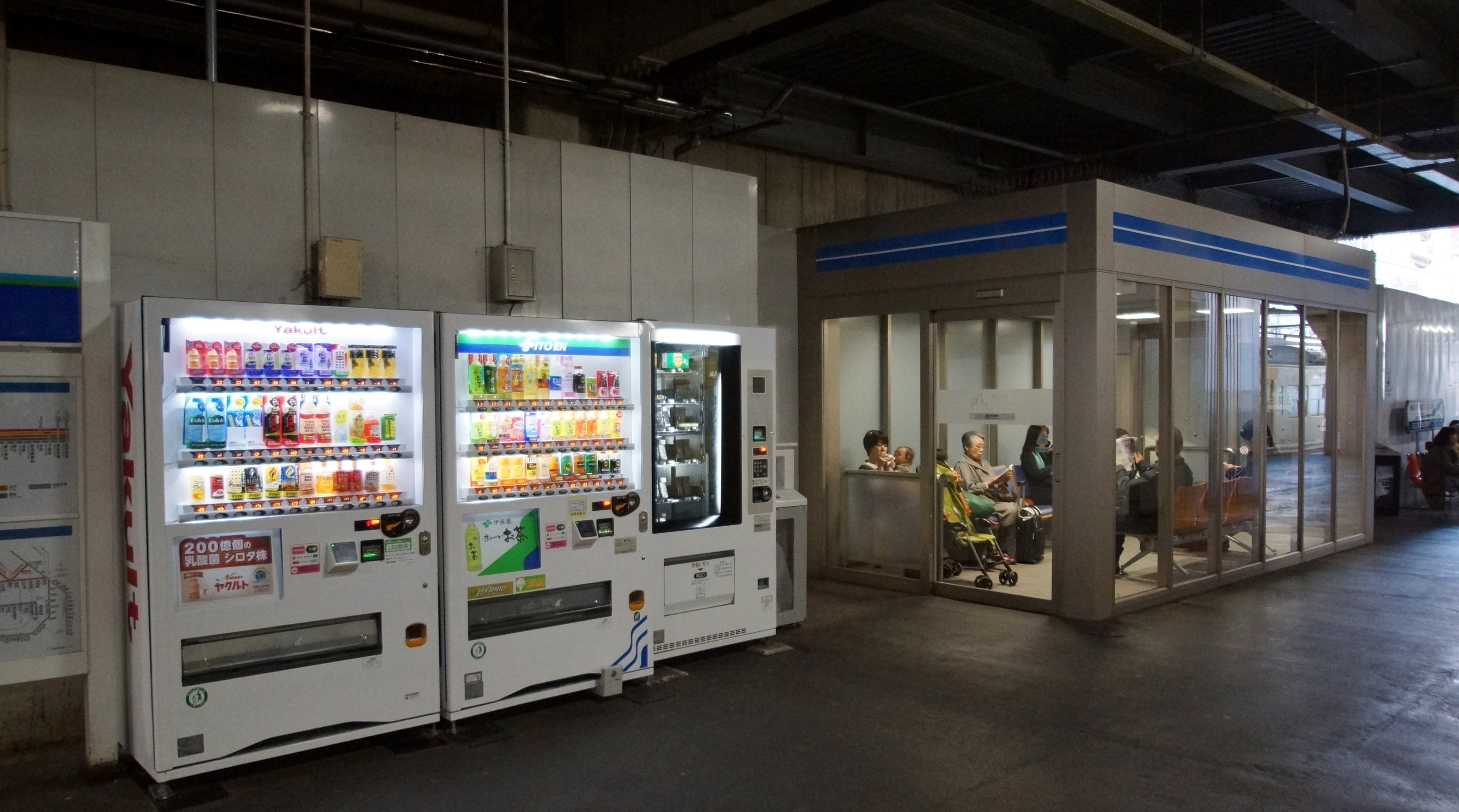
The passenger waiting room on platform 5, November 2013

=== Seibu Railway ===
SK01 ST01 Kokubunji Station 国分寺駅
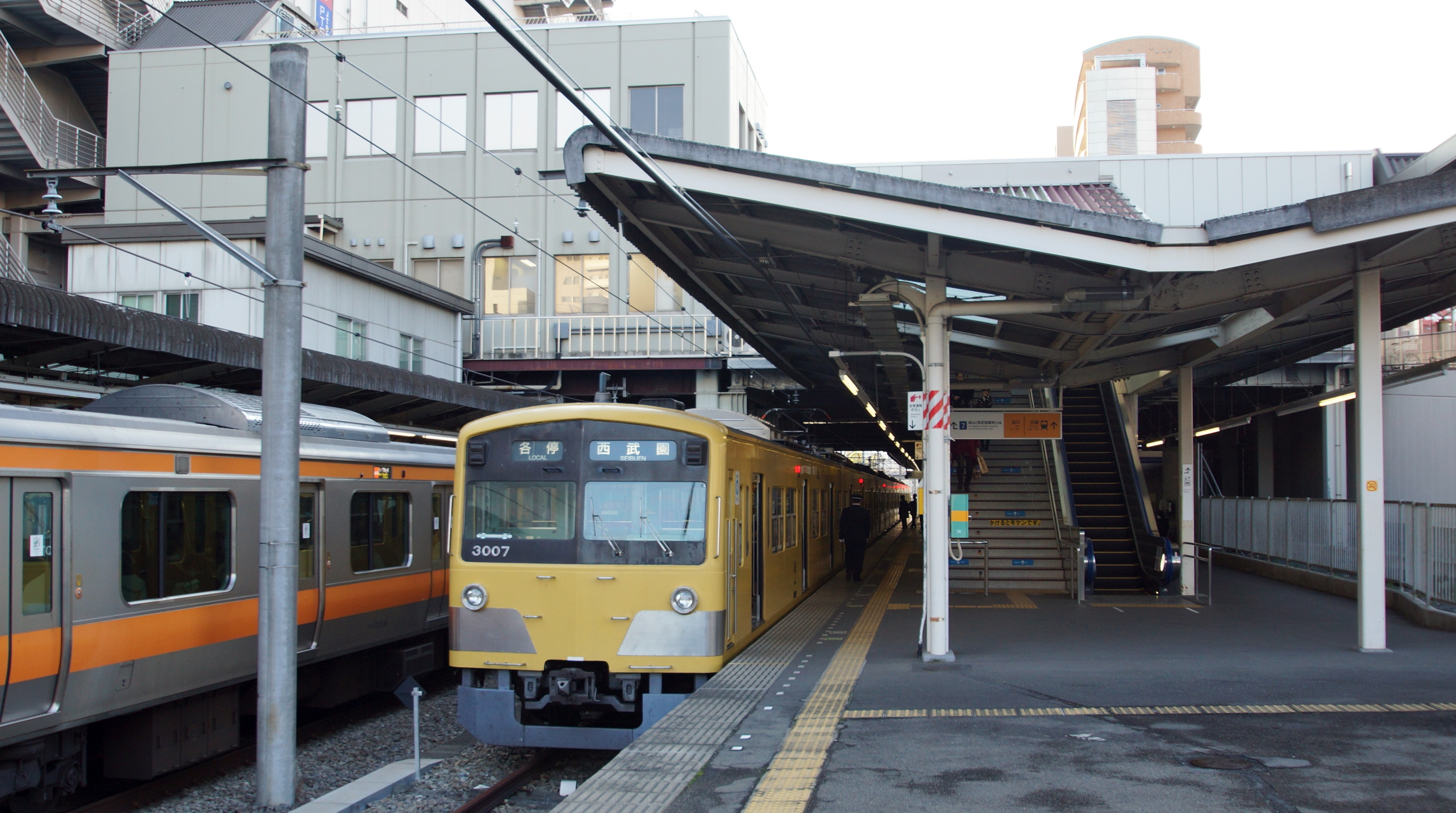
- Seibu Kokubunji Line train at platform 5, November 2013

General information
- Location: 2-1-23 Honchō, Kokubunji-shi, Tokyo 185-0021; Japan
- System: Seibu station
- Operator: Seibu Railway
- Lines: Seibu Kokubunji Line; Seibu Tamako Line
- Platforms: 2 side platforms

Other information
- Station code: SK01, ST01

History
- Opened: 21 December 1894; 131 years ago

Passengers
- FY2024: 111,199 (daily) ▲2.7%

Services
Preceding station	Seibu Railway	Following station
Koigakubo SK02 towards Higashi-Murayama	Kokubunji Line	Terminus
Hitotsubashi-Gakuen ST02 towards Tamako	Tamako Line	Terminus
Location

=== Seibu Platforms ===
5	Seibu Kokubunji Line	for Ogawa and Higashi-Murayama
7	Seibu Tamako Line	for Hagiyama and Tamako

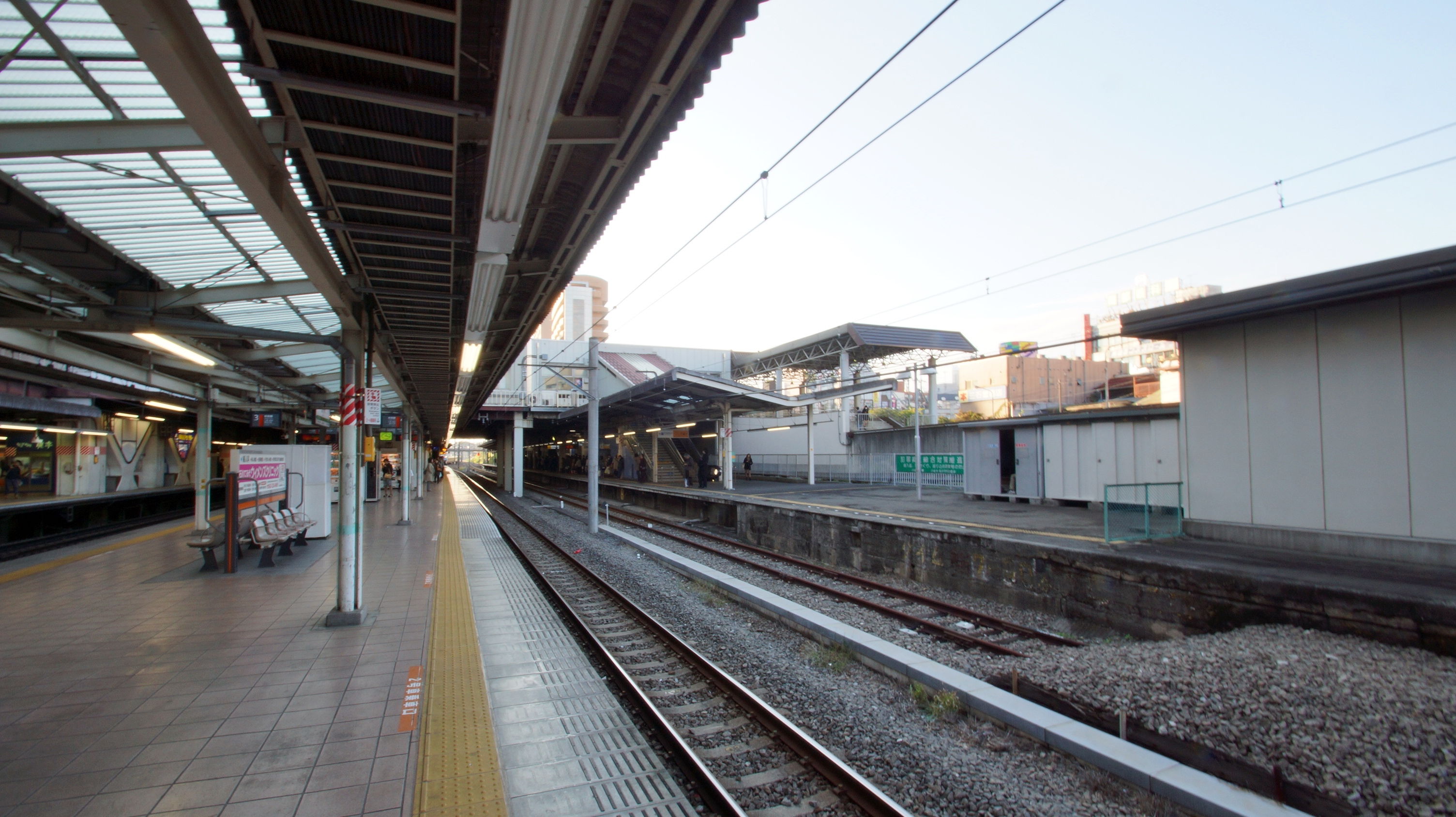
The east end of platform 5 viewed from the JR East platforms, November 2013

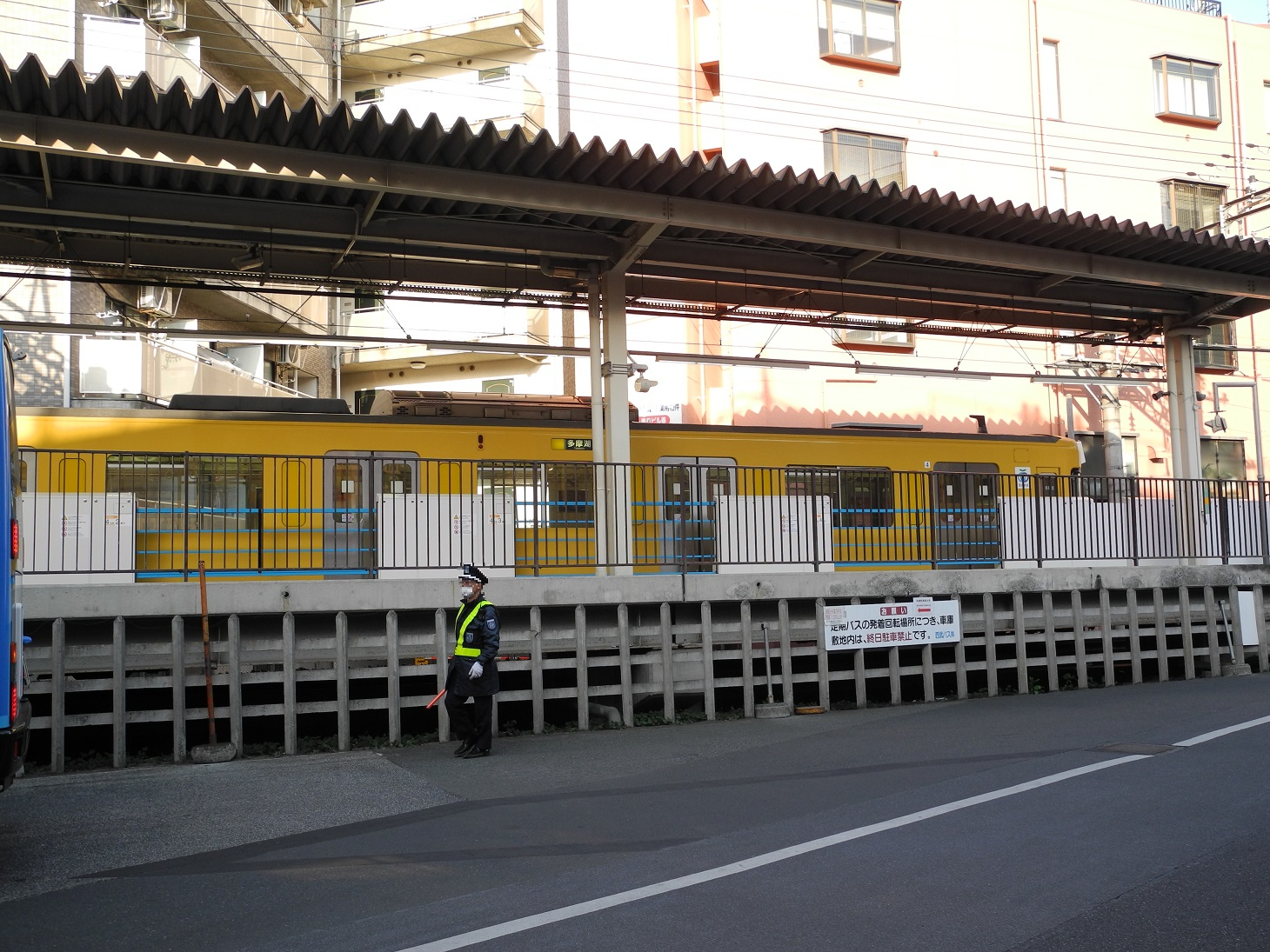
Seibu Kokubunji Station Platform 7, April 2021

== History ==
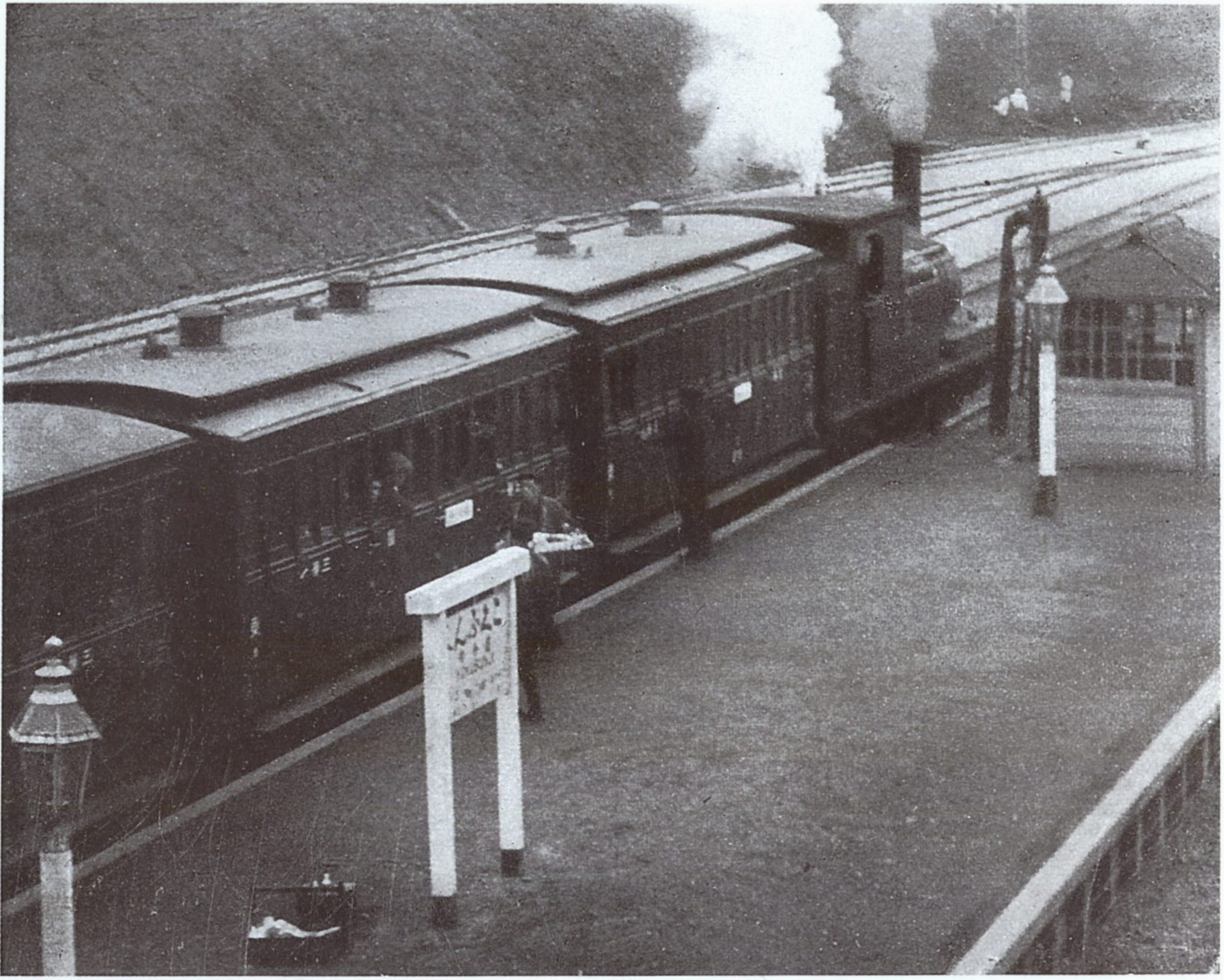
A steam-hauled Chuo Line train at Kokubunji Station in 1915

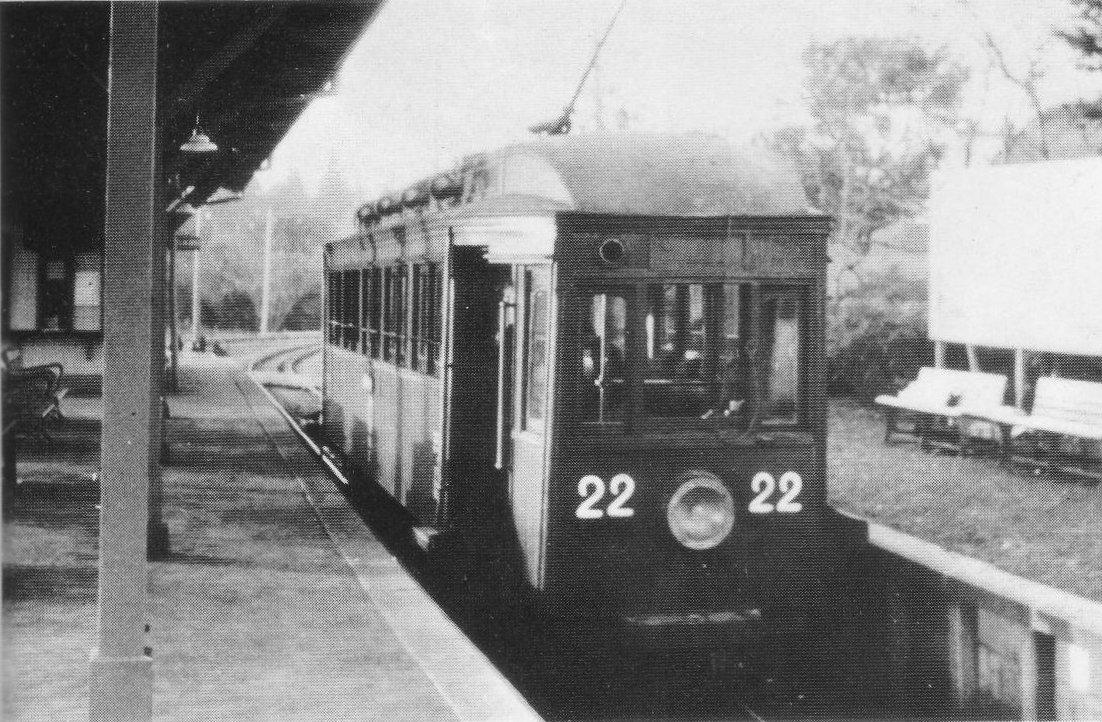
A Tamako Railway train at Kokubunji Station in 1937

What is now the JR East station opened on 11 April 1889. The Seibu Kokubunji Line platforms opened on 21 December 1894, and the Tamako Railway (present-day Seibu Tamako Line) platforms opened on 6 April 1928.

Station numbering was introduced on all Seibu Railway lines during fiscal 2012, with Kokubunji Station becoming "SK01" on the Seibu Kokubunji Line and "ST01" on the Seibu Tamako Line.

== Passenger statistics ==
In fiscal 2019, the station was used by an average of 112,090 passengers daily (boarding passengers only), making it the 31st busiest in the JR East network. The Seibu station was used by an average of 117,796 passengers daily making it the sixth busiest station served by Seibu. The passenger figures for previous years are as shown below. Note that JR East figures consider only boarding passengers whereas Seibu figures consider both entering and exiting passengers.

Fiscal year	JR East	Seibu
2000	100,815	
2005	103,862	116,629
2010	105,883	114,779
2015	111,325	118,392

== Surrounding area ==
=== North side ===
- Tokyo Gakugei University
- Bunka Gakuen University

=== South side ===
- Tonogayato Garden
- Hotel Mets Kokubunji
- Tokyo Keizai University
- Tokyo University of Agriculture and Technology

== See also ==
- List of railway stations in Japan
