= Tokyo Keizai University =

Private university in Japan

Coordinates: 35°41′58″N 139°29′26″E

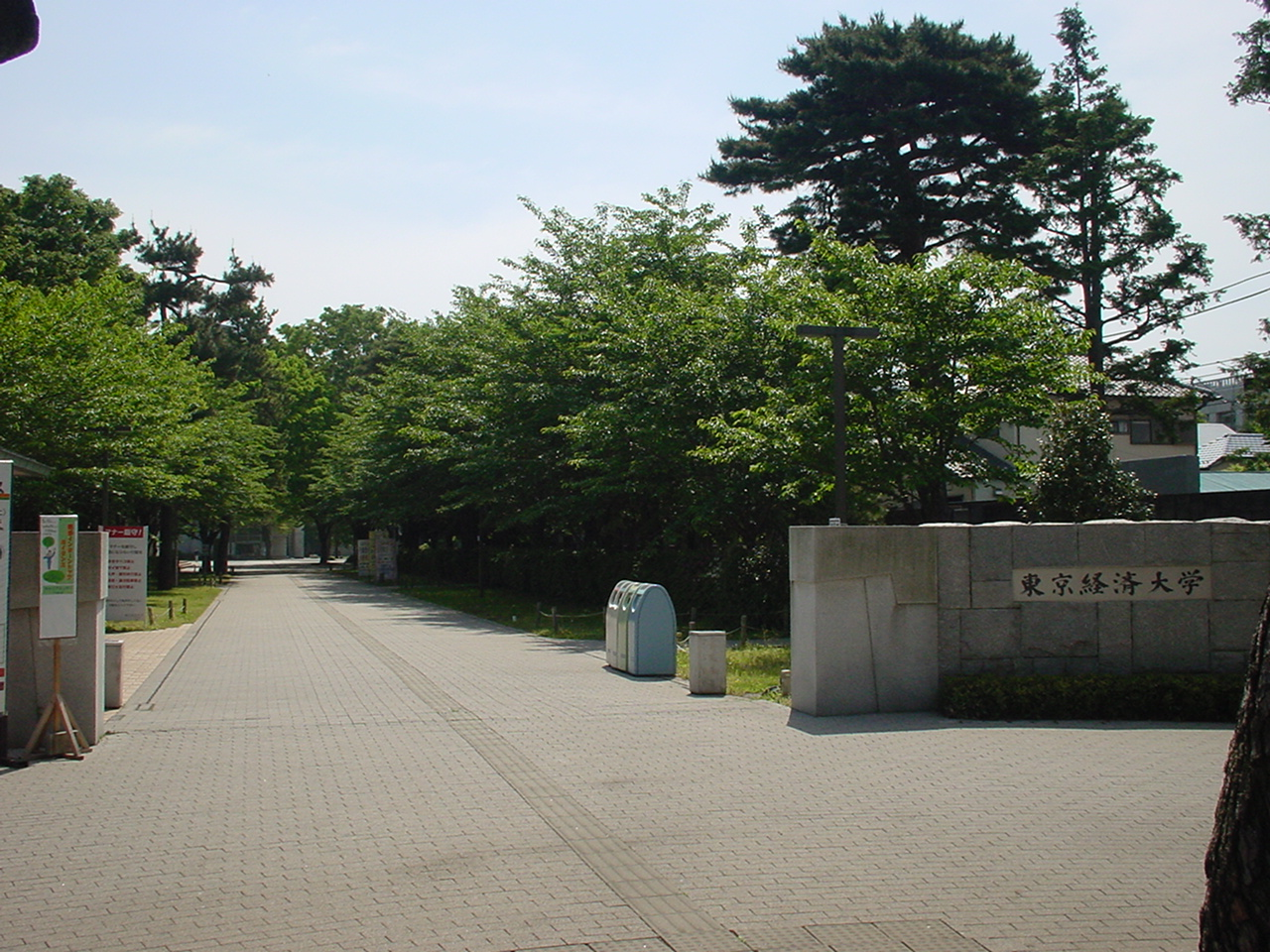
Tokyo Keizai University. Kokubunji campus

Tokyo Keizai University (東京経済大学, Tōkyō keizai daigaku) (Tokyo University of Economics) is a private university in Kokubunji, Tokyo, Japan.

== Overview ==
It has campuses at the cities of Kokubunji and Musashimurayama. The predecessor of the school (Ōkura Shōgyō Gakkō) was founded in 1900 by the entrepreneur Okura Kihachiro, and it was chartered as a university in 1949.

== Academic Rankings ==
THE JAPAN RANKING 150

The Best Listing Officer Ranking 40
