= Higashi-Murayama Station =

Railway station in Higashimurayama, Tokyo, Japan

SS21 SK05 Higashi-Murayama Station 東村山駅
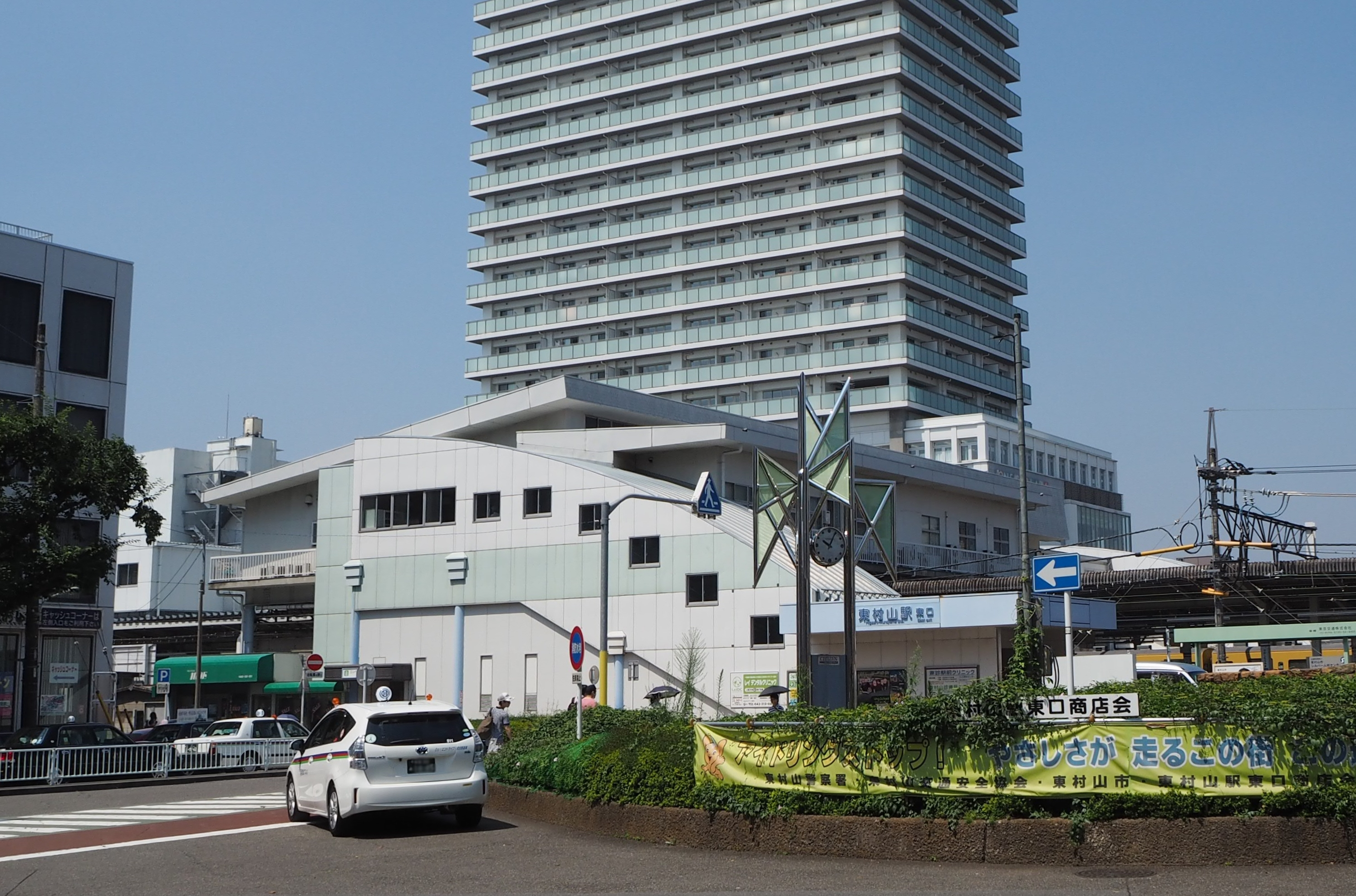
- The east entrance, July 2015

General information
- Location: 2-3-32 Honchō, Higashimurayama-shi, Tokyo 189-0014; Japan
- Coordinates: 35°45′37.76″N 139°27′57.11″E
- Operator: Seibu Railway
- Lines: Seibu Shinjuku Line; Seibu Kokubunji Line; Seibu Seibuen Line
- Distance: 26.0 km from Seibu-Shinjuku
- Platforms: 3 island platforms
- Connections: Bus terminal

Other information
- Station code: SS21, SK05
- Website: Official website

History
- Opened: 21 December 1894

Passengers
- FY2019: 48,934 daily

Services
Preceding station	Seibu Railway	Following station
Tokorozawa SS22 towards Hon-Kawagoe	Koedo	Takadanobaba SS02 towards Seibu-Shinjuku
Tokorozawa SS22 towards Hon-Kawagoe	Shinjuku Line Rapid Express	Tanashi One-way operation
Tokorozawa One-way operation	Shinjuku Line Commuter Express	Tanashi SS17 towards Seibu-Shinjuku
Tokorozawa SS22 towards Hon-Kawagoe	Shinjuku Line Express Semi Express Local	Kumegawa SS20 towards Seibu-Shinjuku
Terminus	Kokubunji Line	Ogawa SK04 towards Kokubunji
Seibuen SK06 Terminus	Seibuen Line	Terminus
Location
- Location within Tokyo Location within Japan

Higashi-Murayama Station (東村山駅, Higashi-Murayama-eki) is a junction passenger railway station located in the city of Higashimurayama, Tokyo, Japan, operated by the private railway operator Seibu Railway.

== Lines ==
Higashi-Murayama Station is served by the Seibu Shinjuku Line, the Seibu Kokubunji Line, and the Seibuen Line. It is 26.0 km from the Tokyo terminus of the Seibu Shinjuku Line at Seibu Shinjuku Station and 7.8 kilometers from the terminus of the Seibu Kokubunji Line at Kokubunji Station. All trains (including limited express services) stop at this station. It is also the terminus station of the Seibuen Line.

== Station layout ==
Higashi-Murayama Station has two entrances, east and west, with one set of ticket barriers located centrally above the tracks. The platforms are connected by three overhead passageways. The station has one island platform and three side platforms serving five tracks.

=== Platforms ===
1/2	Seibu Kokubunji Line	for Ogawa and Kokubunji
3	Seibu Seibuen Line	for Seibuen
4/5	Seibu Shinjuku Line	for Tokorozawa and Hon-Kawagoe
6	Seibu Shinjuku Line	for Tanashi, Takadanobaba, and Seibu-Shinjuku

Platforms 2 and 3 share the same track. Limited express trains towards Hon-Kawagoe stop at platform 5.

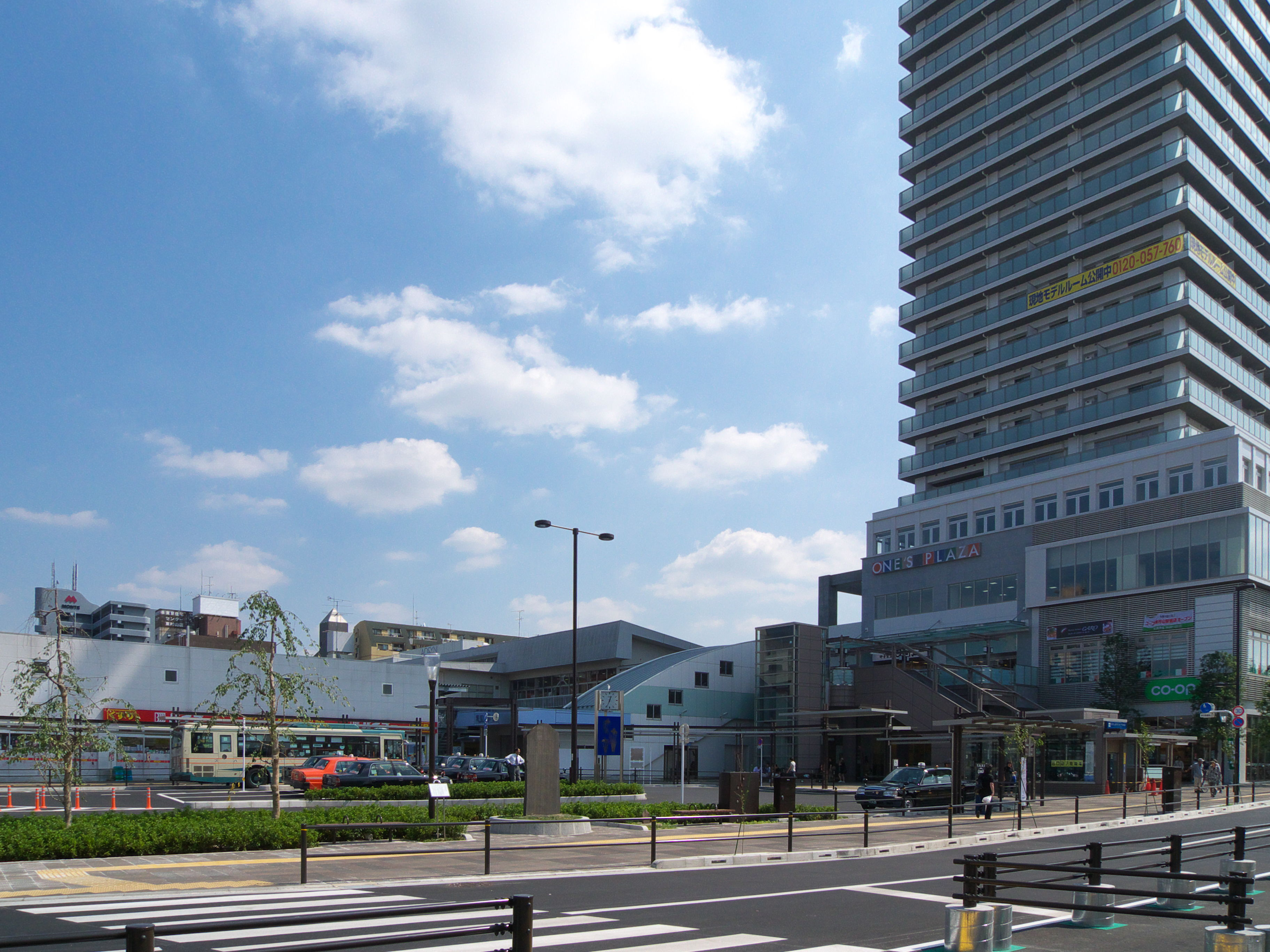
The west side of the station, September 2009

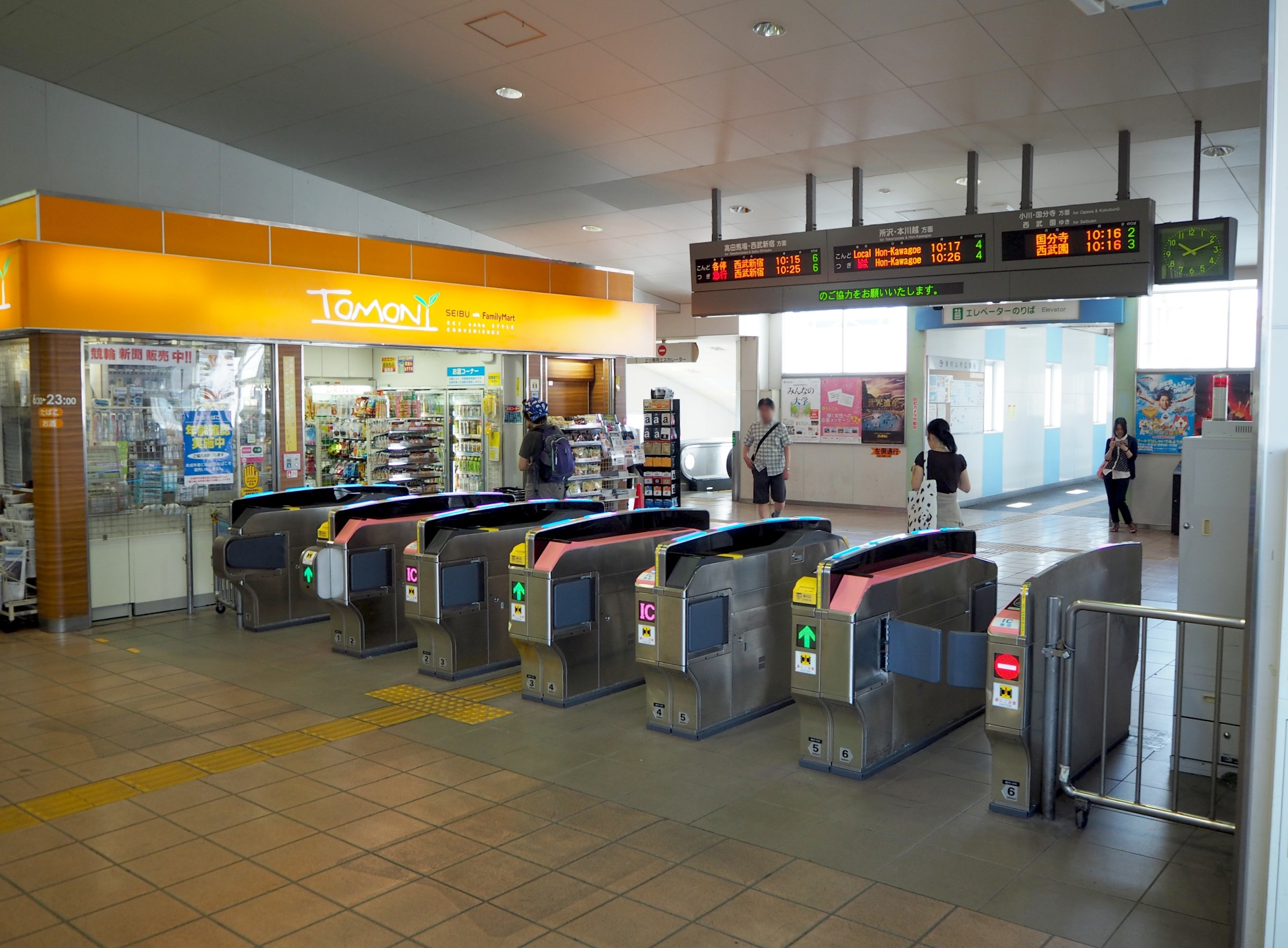
The ticket barriers, July 2015

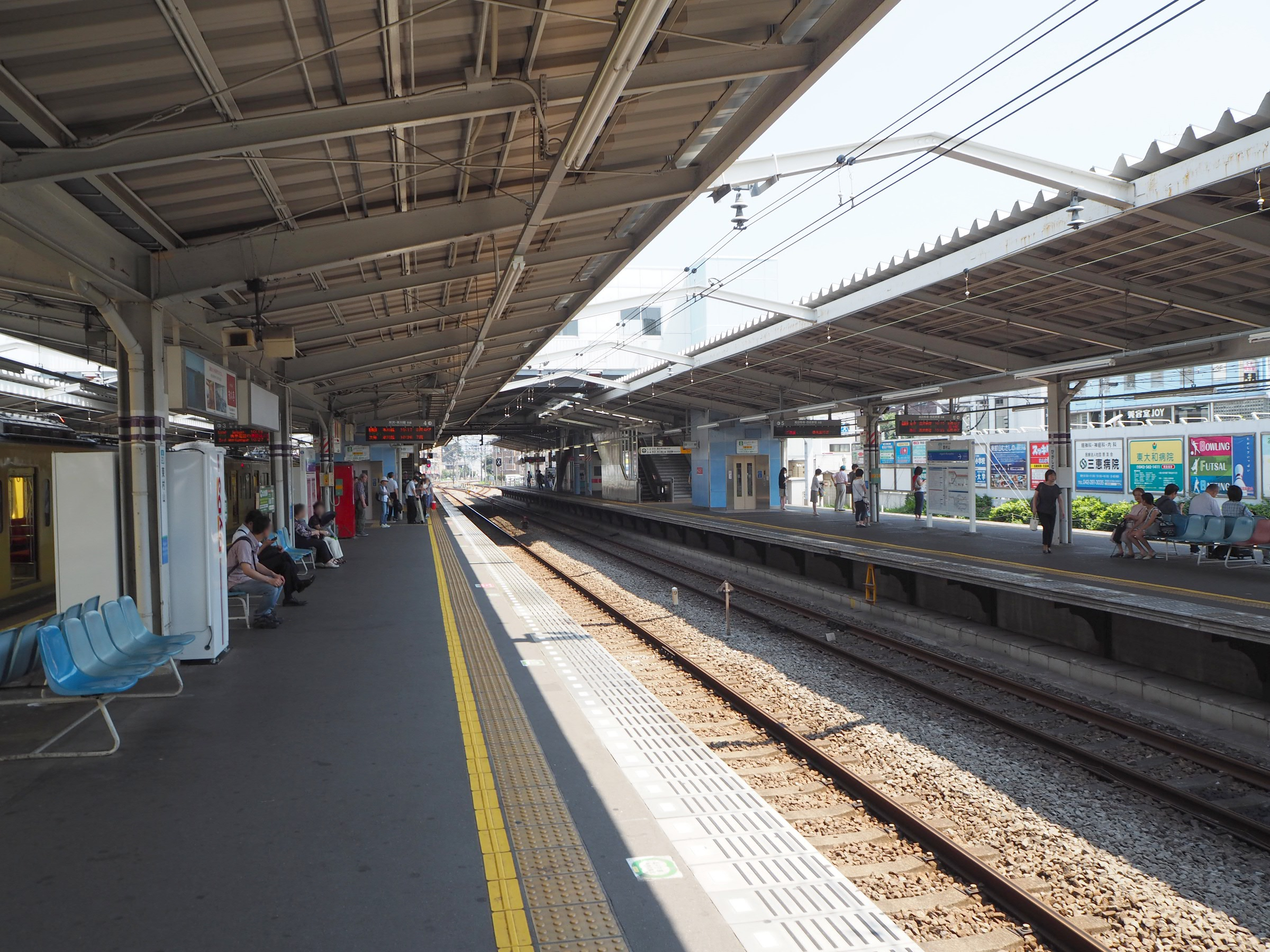
The platforms, July 2015

== History ==
The station opened on 21 December 1894.

Station numbering was introduced on all Seibu Railway lines during fiscal 2012, with Higashi-Murayama Station becoming "SS21" for the Shinjuku Line and "SK05" for the Kokubunji and Seibuen Lines.

In 2015, construction began on a new elevated station facility for all lines. The relocation of all services into the new elevated structure was originally scheduled to take place in 2024, but delays pushed the completion of relocation until at least 2027, with other access projects continuing until 2030. On 29 June 2025, the outbound Shinjuku Line tracks of the station were shifted onto new elevated platforms as part of the Tokyo Resilience Project.

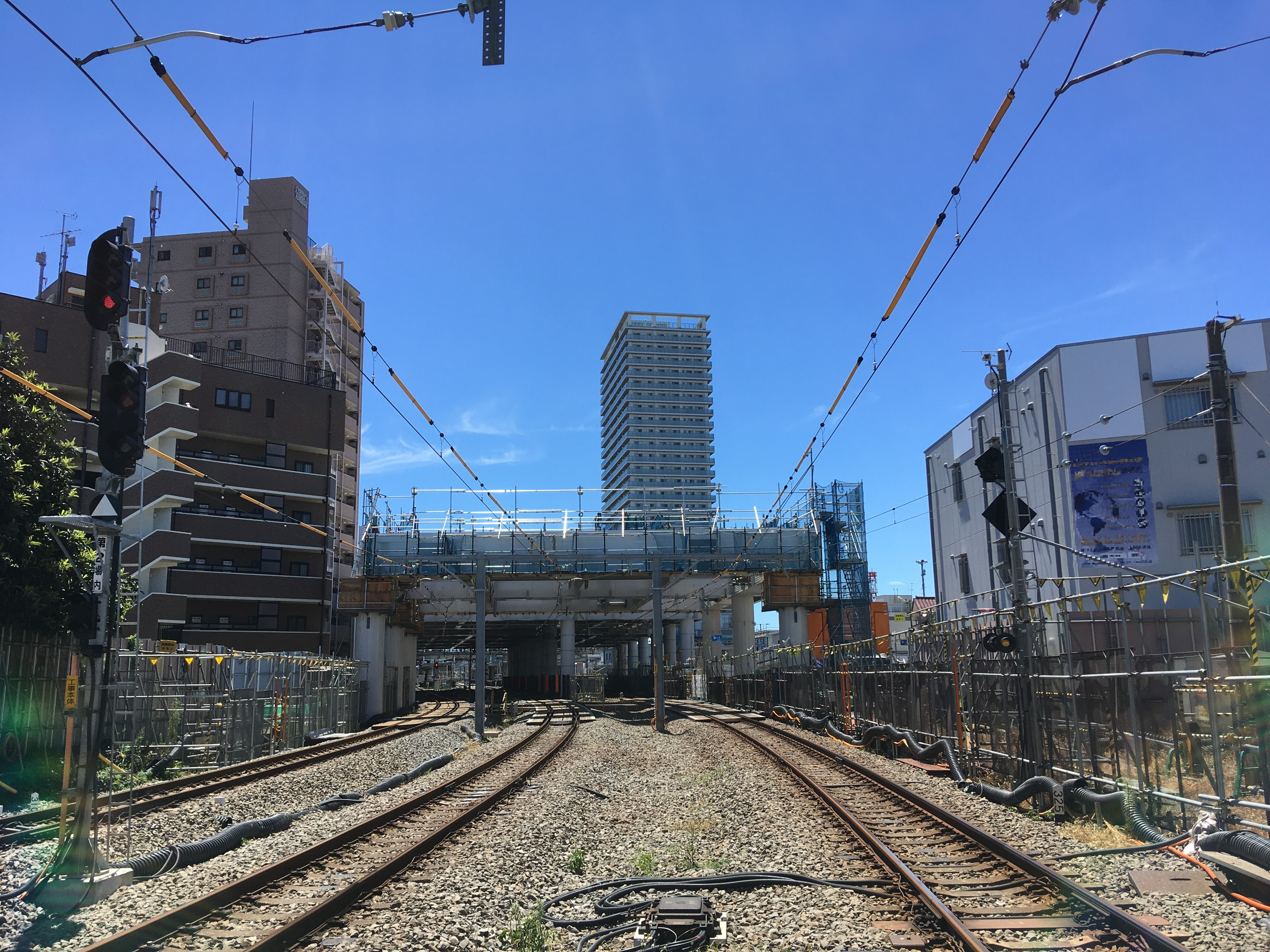
Construction of the new elevated station as seen in August 2020

== Accidents ==
On 24 December 2011, at 16:40, the seventh car of an 8-car train forming a service from Seibuen to Seibu-Shinjuku derailed as the train approached the station, blocking the line for the rest of the day. None of the approximately 450 passengers on board were injured in the accident.

== Passenger statistics ==
In fiscal 2019, the station was the 19th busiest on the Seibu network with an average of 48,934 passengers daily.

The passenger figures for previous years are as shown below.

Fiscal year	Daily average
2005	30,684
2010	32,675
2015	33,991

== Surrounding area ==
To the east of the station is an Ito-Yokado department store, the Central Public Civic Hall, and Higashimurayama Central Post Office as well as Higashimurayama City Hall.

Buses for Tachikawa Station depart from the west side of the station. A bus departs from the east side to make a loop within Higashimurayama. Taxis depart from both sides, also.

== See also ==
- List of railway stations in Japan
