= Leoliner =

Leoliner may refer to:

- Leo Liner, the official nickname of Seibu Yamaguchi Line, a people mover in Japan
- Leoliner (tramcar), a tramcar made for Leipziger Verkehrsbetriebe in Germany, also used in Halberstadt
