= Shimo-Yamaguchi Station =

Railway station in Tokorozawa, Saitama Prefecture, Japan

SI40 Shimo-Yamaguchi Station 下山口駅
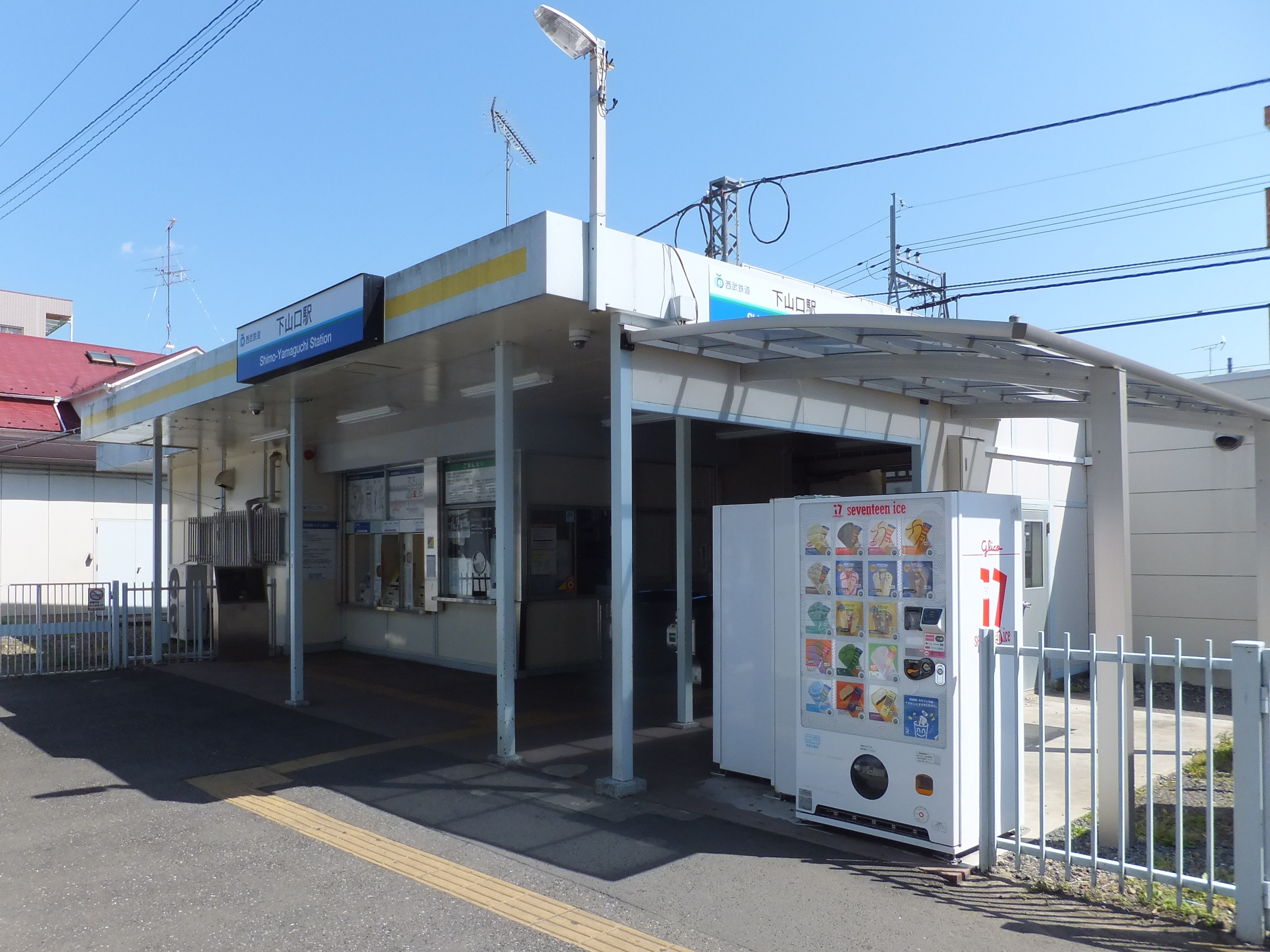
- Shimo-Yamaguchi Station entrance, March 2016

General information
- Location: 1254-3 Yamaguchi, Tokorozawa-shi, Saitama-ken 359-1145; Japan
- Coordinates: 35.7794°N 139.4411°E
- Operator: Seibu Railway
- Line: Seibu Sayama Line
- Distance: 29.0 km from Ikebukuro
- Platforms: 1 island platform

Other information
- Station code: SI40
- Website: Official website

History
- Opened: 1 May 1929
- Closed: 10 October 1954 to 4 June 1976

Passengers
- FY2019: 8,012 daily

Services
Preceding station	Seibu Railway	Following station
Seibukyūjō-mae SI41 Terminus	Sayama Line	Nishi-Tokorozawa SI18 Terminus
Location
- Location within Saitama Prefecture Location within Japan

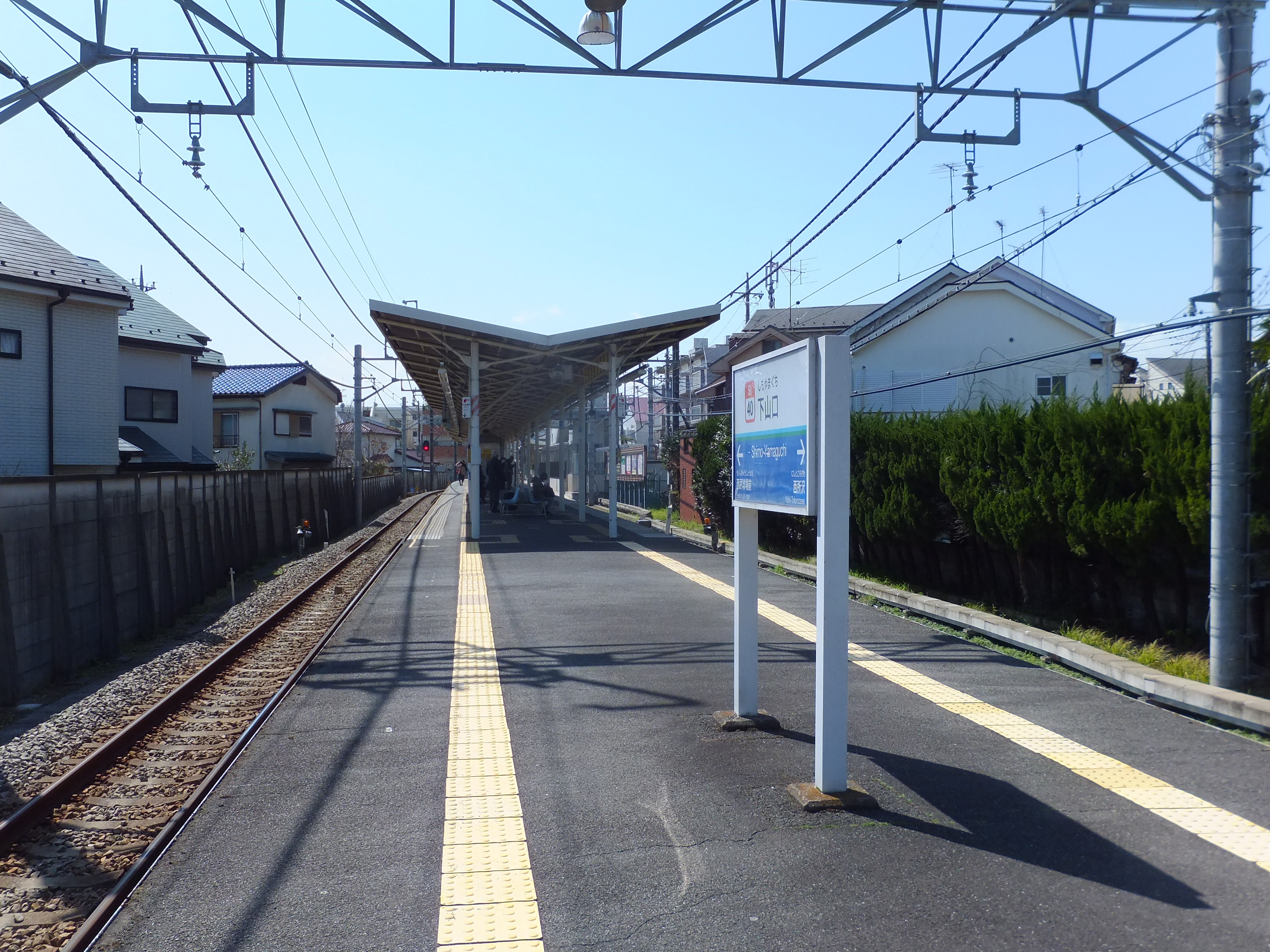
View of the platforms, March 2016

Shimo-Yamaguchi Station (下山口駅, Shimo-Yamaguchi eki) is a passenger railway station located in the city of Tokorozawa, Saitama, Japan, operated by the private railway operator Seibu Railway.

== Lines ==
Shimo-Yamaguchi Station is served by the 4.2 km Seibu Sayama Line from Nishi-Tokorozawa to Seibukyūjō-mae, and is located 1.8 km from the starting point of the Sayama Line at Nishi-Tokorozawa. Some through services operate to and from Ikebukuro via the Seibu Ikebukuro Line.

== Station layout ==
The station consists of a ground-level island platform serving two tracks, connected to the station building by a footbridge.

=== Platforms ===
1	Seibu Sayama Line	for Seibukyūjō-mae
2	Seibu Sayama Line	for Nishi-Tokorozawa, Tokorozawa, and Ikebukuro

== History ==
The station opened on 1 May 1929. It closed on 10 October 1954, but reopened on 4 June 1976.

Station numbering was introduced on all Seibu Railway lines during fiscal 2012, with Shimo-Yamaguchi Station becoming "SI40".

== Passenger statistics ==
In fiscal 2019, the station was the 72nd busiest on the Seibu network with an average of 8,012 passengers daily. The passenger figures for previous years are as shown below.

Fiscal year	Daily average
2000	9,804
2009	8,902
2010	8,668
2011	8,632
2012	8,517
2013	8,423

== Surrounding area ==
- Tokorozawa Yamaguchi Junior High School
