= Seibu L00 series =

Japanese train type

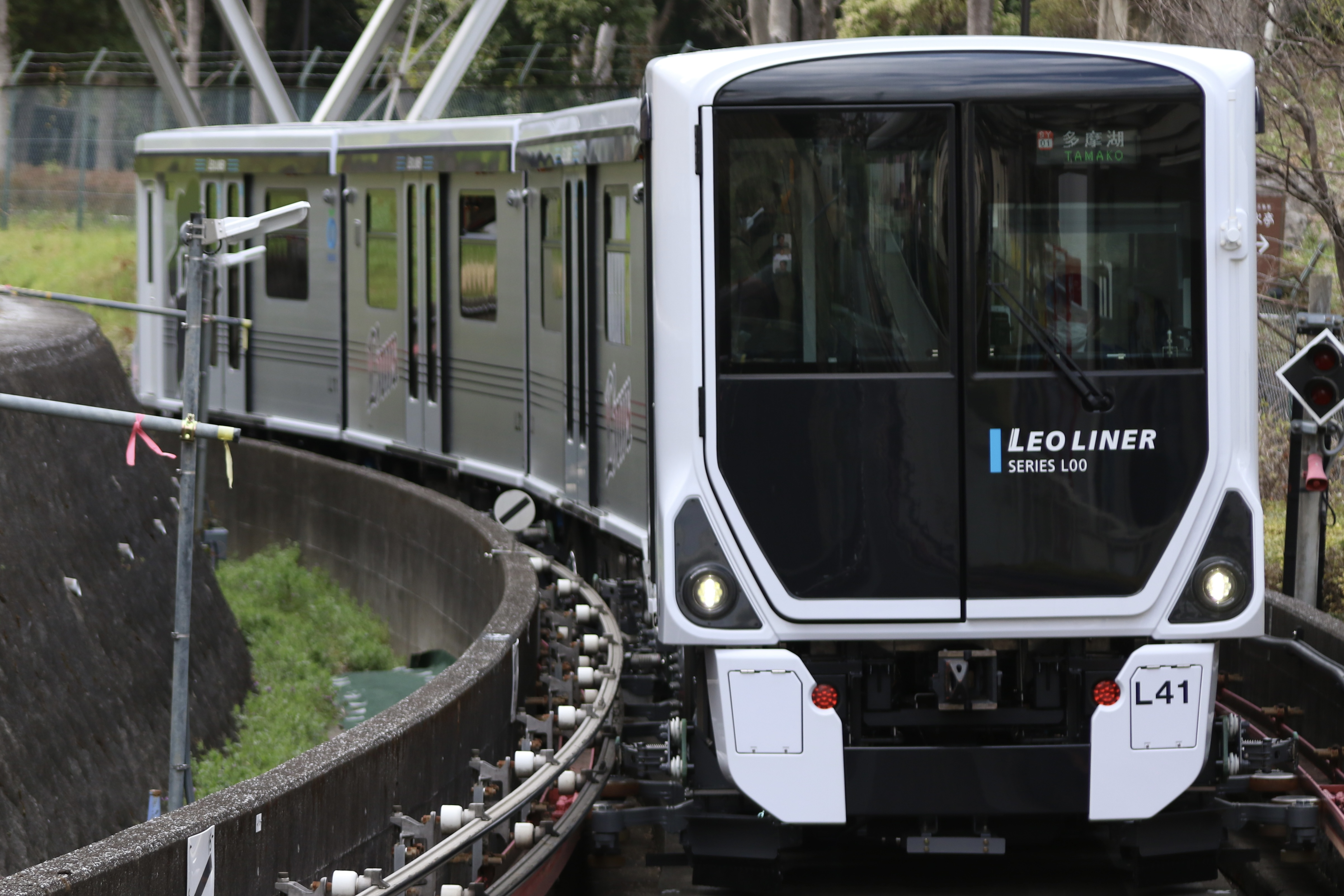
- L00 series set in March 2026
- In service: 2026–present
- Manufacturer: Mitsubishi Heavy Industries
- Built at: Mihara, Hiroshima
- Family name: Leo Liner
- Replaced: 8500 series
- Constructed: 2025–present
- Entered service: 27 March 2026
- Number under construction: 8 vehicles (2 sets)
- Number built: 4 vehicles (1 set)
- Formation: 4 cars per trainset
- Capacity: 144 (56 seated) per set
- Operator: Seibu Railway
- Line served: Yamaguchi Line

Specifications
- Car body construction: Aluminum alloy
- Train length: 34,000 mm (111 ft 7 in)
- Car length: 8,500 mm (27 ft 11 in)
- Width: 2,420 mm (7 ft 11 in)
- Height: 3,340 mm (10 ft 11 in)
- Doors: 1 per side
- Maximum speed: 60 km/h (37 mph) (design)
- Traction system: 2-level VVVF
- Traction motors: Three-phase induction motor
- Acceleration: 3.5 km/(h⋅s) (2.2 mph/s)
- Deceleration: 3.5 km/(h⋅s) (2.2 mph/s); 5 km/(h⋅s) (3.1 mph/s) (emergency)
- Electric systems: 750 V DC (Third rail)

Notes/references
- Specifications

The Seibu L00 series (西武L00系, Seibu Reo-kei) is a people mover train type operated by the private railway operator Seibu Railway on Yamaguchi Line services since 2026. Three four-car sets are to be built by Mitsubishi Heavy Industries by fiscal 2027 to replace the ageing 8500 series fleet.

== Exterior ==
The first set features a livery that is based on the Saitama Seibu Lions. The second set is expected to receive a navy blue livery with decorations inspired by the fireworks and illuminations at the Seibu-en amusement park.

== Interior ==
Passenger accommodation consists of mostly longitudinal seating throughout with a bench seat for one child and one adult that faces the front end of each lead car. All cars have an accessible "free space". The intermediate cars feature showcase displays. LCD displays are installed above the doorways.

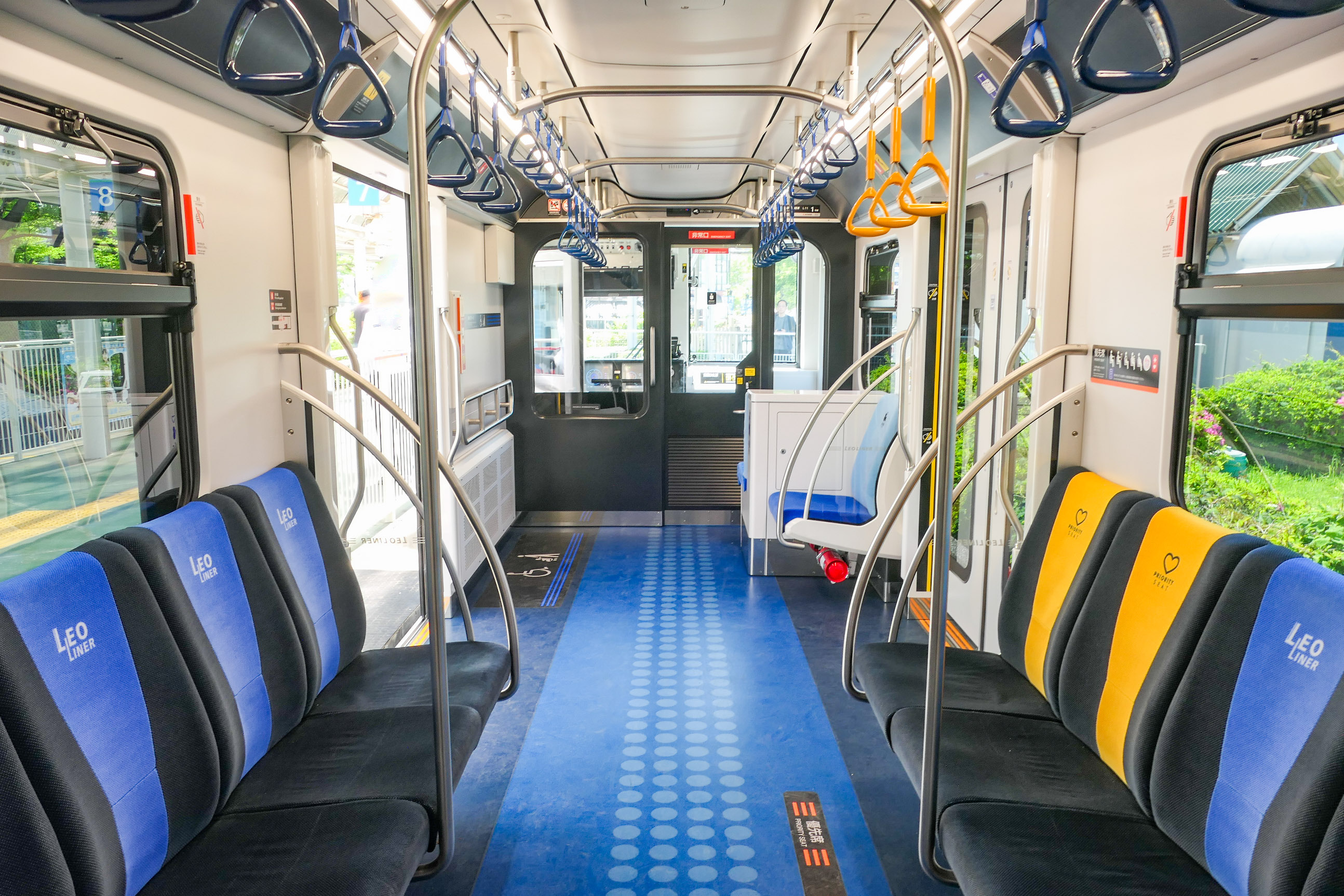
Interior

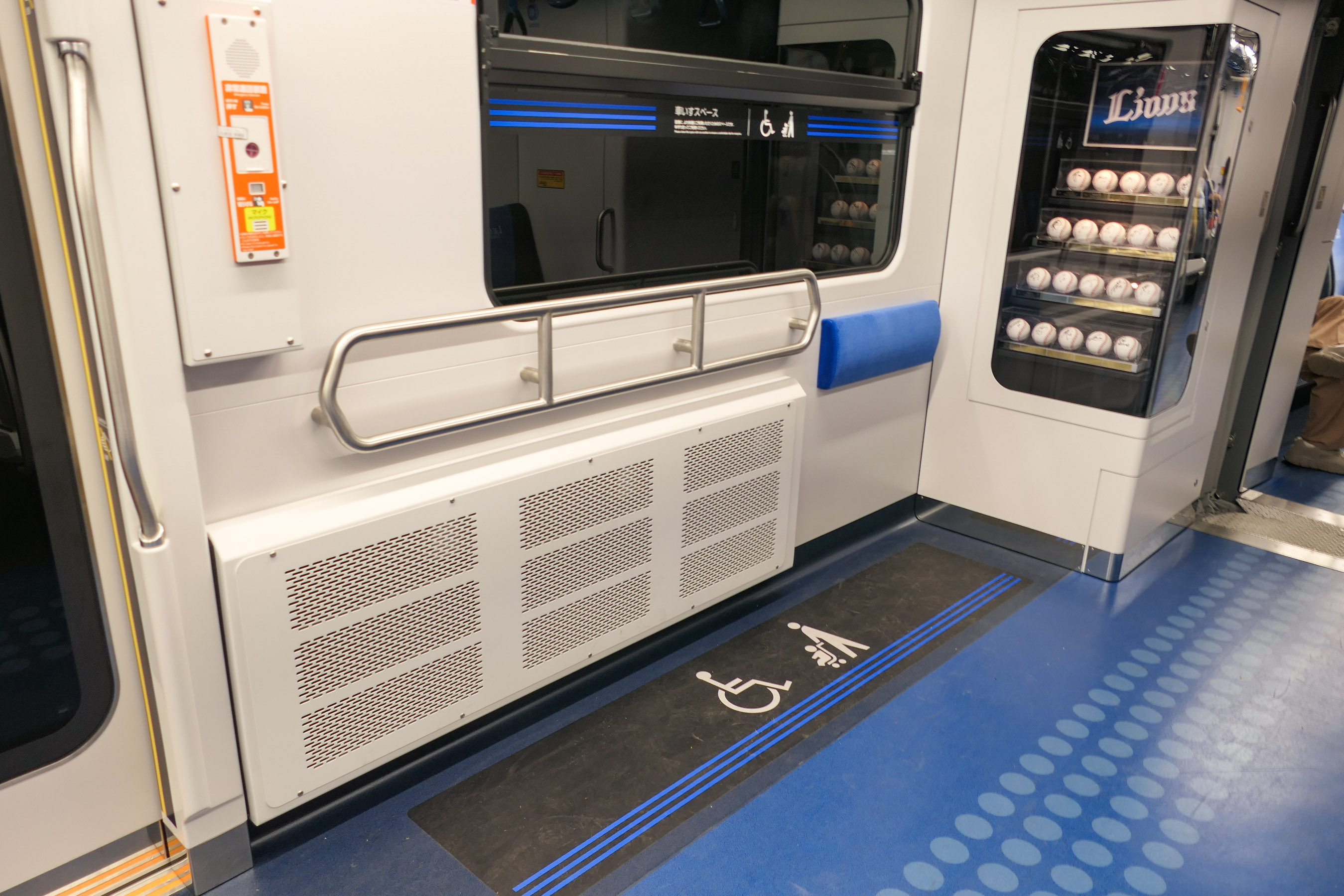
Free space

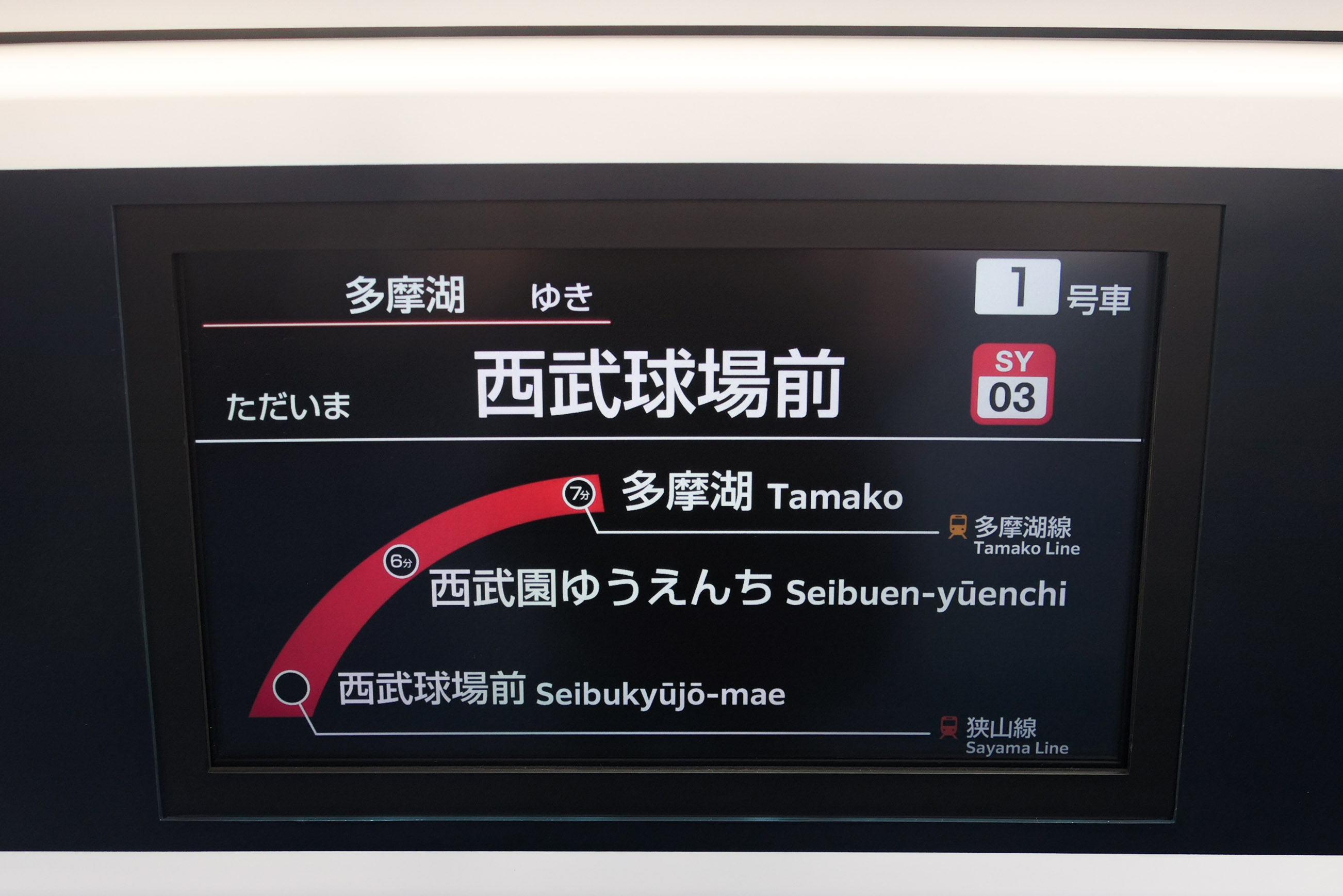
Information display

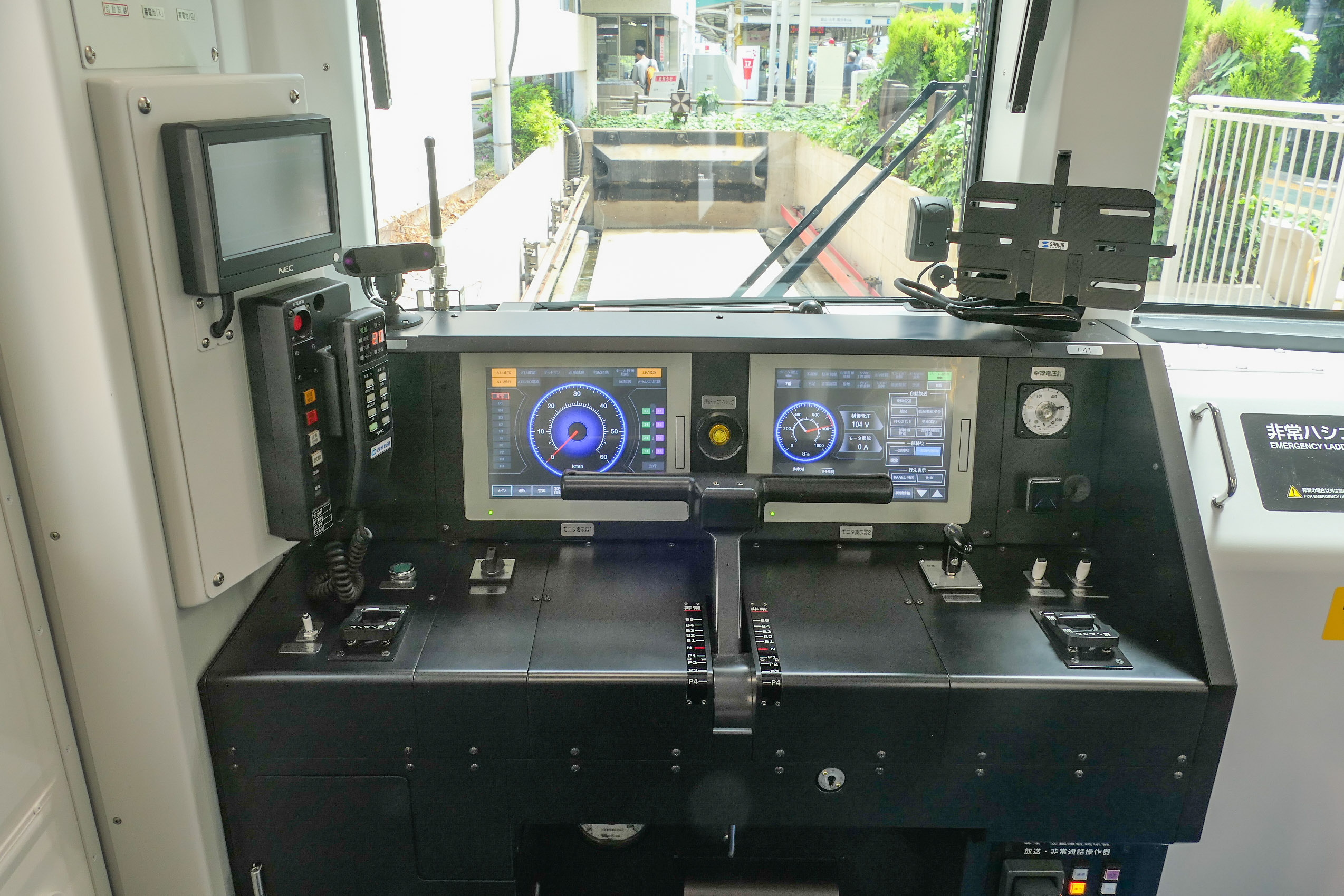
Driver's cab

== Formation ==
Sets are formed as shown below.

| Designation | Tc1 | M1 | M2 | Tc2 |
| Weight (t) | 10.2 | 10.5 | 10.4 | 10.2 |
| Capacity (total/seated) | 32/12 | 40/16 | 40/16 | 32/12 |

== History ==
Details of the new Leo Liner train type on order were first announced on 22 January 2025.

On 18 November 2025, Seibu announced that the new Leo Liner train type would be classified as the L00 series. The first set was unveiled at the Mitsubishi Heavy Industries Mihara works on that same day and delivered later in that month.

The L00 series entered revenue service on 27 March 2026. Following that, one set is scheduled to be introduced every year until fiscal 2027.
