= Belluna Dome =

Baseball stadium in Saitama, Japan

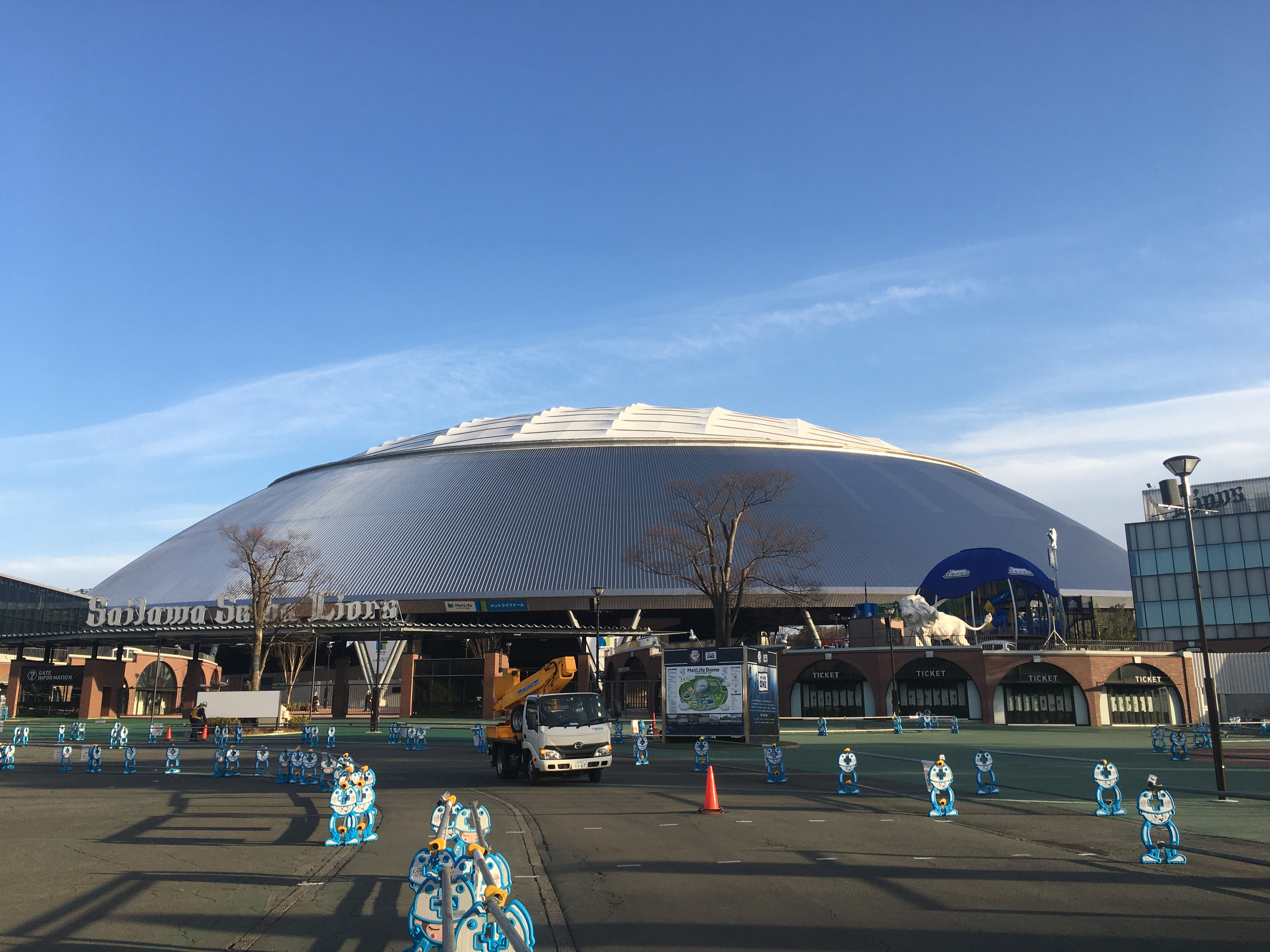
- Interactive map of Belluna Dome
- Full name: Belluna Dome
- Former names: Seibu Lions Stadium (1979–1997); Seibu Dome (1998–2004, 2008–2015); Invoice Seibu Dome (2005–2006); Goodwill Dome (2007); Seibu Prince Dome (2015–2017); MetLife Dome (2017–2022)
- Location: 2135 Kami-Yamaguchi, Tokorozawa City, Saitama, Japan
- Coordinates: 35°46′6.6″N 139°25′13.80″E
- Owner: Seibu Railway Company, Ltd
- Operator: Saitama Seibu Lions
- Capacity: 31,552
- Surface: Artificial
- Field size: Left field: 100 m (328.1 ft); Center field: 122 m (400.3 ft); Right field: 100 m (328.1 ft); Outfield fence height: 3.2 m (10.5 ft) – 4.37 m (14.3 ft)
- Public transit: Seibu Railway: Sayama Line and Yamaguchi Line at Seibukyūjō-mae

Construction
- Groundbreaking: July 1, 1978
- Built: March 31, 1979
- Opened: April 14, 1979
- Renovated: 2007–2008
- Expanded: July 7, 1997–March 18, 1999 (roof construction)
- Architects: Yoshiro Ikehara (Stadium); Kajima Construction Corporation, Ltd. (roof construction)
- General contractors: Seibu Constructions (Stadium); Kajima Construction Corporation, Ltd. (roof construction)

Tenant
- Saitama Seibu Lions (1979–present)

Website
- https://bellunadome.seibulions.co.jp/

Belluna Dome (ベルーナドーム, Berūna Dōmu) (also named Seibu Dome (西武ドーム, Seibu Dōmu)) is a baseball stadium located in Tokorozawa, Saitama, Japan. It is home to the Saitama Seibu Lions, a professional baseball team.

The stadium has a roof over the field and the stands, like other indoor ballparks. However, it lacks a wall behind the stands so that natural air comes into the field. This makes it possible for home runs to leave the stadium, something not possible in typical domed stadiums.

The stadium was built in 1979 without the roof and named Seibu Lions Stadium (西武ライオンズ球場, Seibu Raionzu Kyūjō) as the new home field of the Lions that moved from Fukuoka to Tokorozawa that year. Initially an open-air stadium, the installation of its roof took place in two phases: the first phase after the 1997 season, and the second phase after the 1998 seasons. At the beginning of the 1998 season, the stadium was renamed Seibu Dome although the domed roof had not been completed.

Originally, the Lions had planned to build a new stadium in Odaiba, but due to requiring to get approval from the three other Tokyo-based teams at the time (the Nippon-Ham Fighters, the Yomiuri Giants, and the Yakult Swallows), opposition from local fans, and the cost to build a new stadium, they decided to just add a roof to the stadium.

On March 1, 2005, the stadium was named Invoice Seibu Dome (インボイスSEIBUドーム, Inboisu Seibu Dōmu) as Invoice Inc. bought the naming rights of the stadium for the next two seasons. Upon expiration of the previous contract, on January 1, 2007, the name was changed again to Goodwill Dome (グッドウィルドーム, Guddowiru Dōmu) to reflect the sponsorship of Goodwill Group, Inc. The naming rights contract with Goodwill was intended to remain in effect for five years.

Although Seibu Dome was still the official name of the stadium, the stadium and media used the sponsored name almost exclusively during this period. However, at the end of 2007, Goodwill's naming rights for both the stadium and team were seized due to Goodwill's illegal business movements. The dome's name was restored to Seibu Dome in 2008. On January 16, 2017, MetLife, a New York City-based financial institution, purchased naming rights for five years. On March 1, 2022, Belluna, a mail order company out of Ageo City, Saitama Prefecture, bought the naming rights to the stadium after MetLife's naming right deal expired.

The stadium is located in front of Seibukyūjō-mae Station, the terminal station of the Seibu Sayama Line railway (a branch of the Seibu Ikebukuro Line connecting Tokorozawa with Tokyo) and the Seibu Yamaguchi Line people mover. Both lines are operated by Seibu Railway, the owner of the stadium and the Lions.

Queen performed at the stadium for their last show of the Hot Space Tour in 1982. New Japan Pro-Wrestling held the finals of the 2014 G1 Climax on August 10, 2014, at the arena. Lady Gaga performed two sold-out shows at the stadium for her Chromatica Ball tour on September 3–4, 2022. Aqours, the main group in the Love Live! Sunshine!! anime, held their final concert at Belluna Dome on June 21–22, 2025. Travis Scott held a concert at the stadium for his Circus Maximus Tour on November 8, 2025, bringing out a surprise guest, Kanye West.

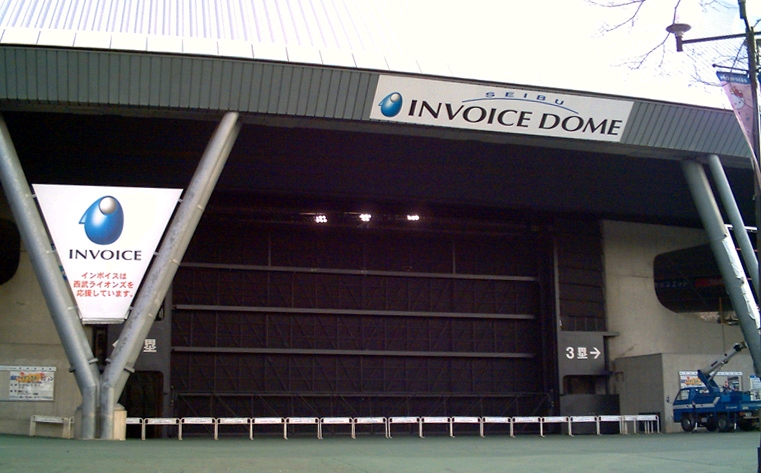
Invoice Seibu Dome (2006)

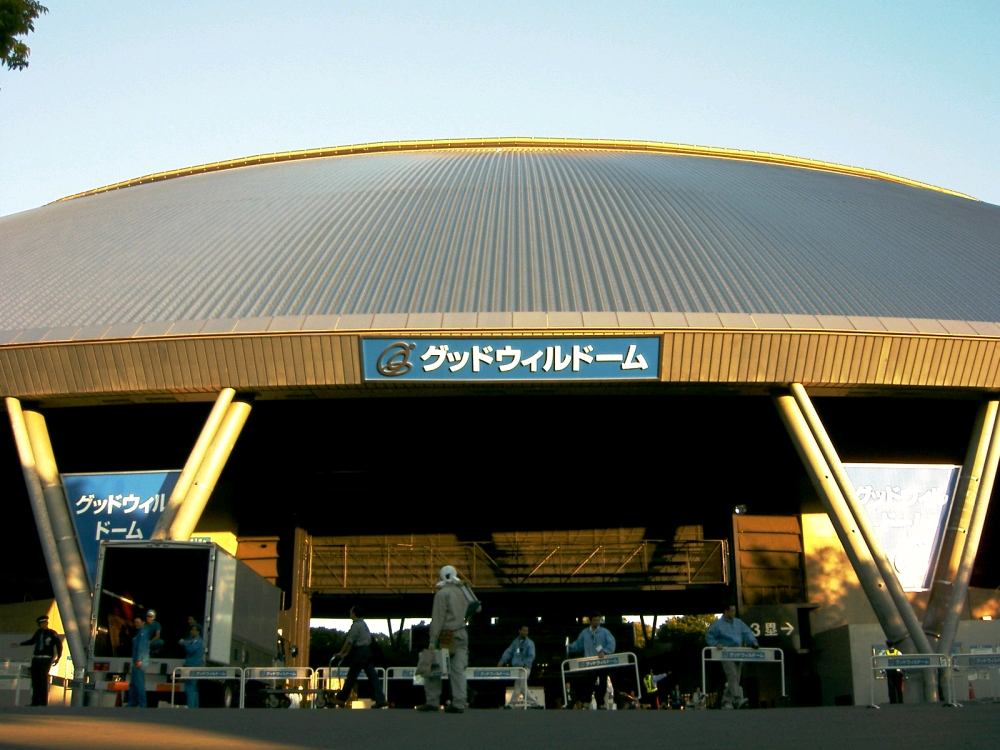
Goodwill Dome (2007)

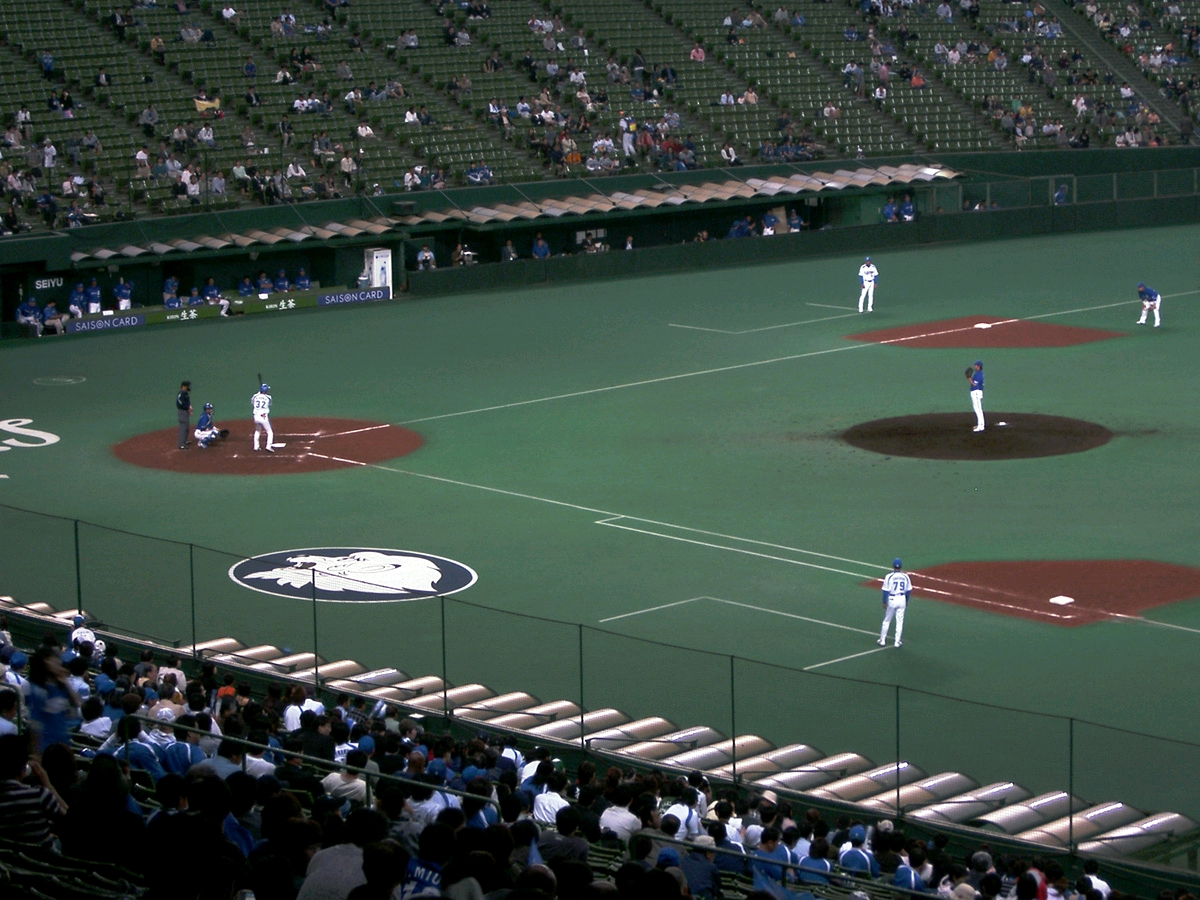
Seibu Lions baseball game (2007)

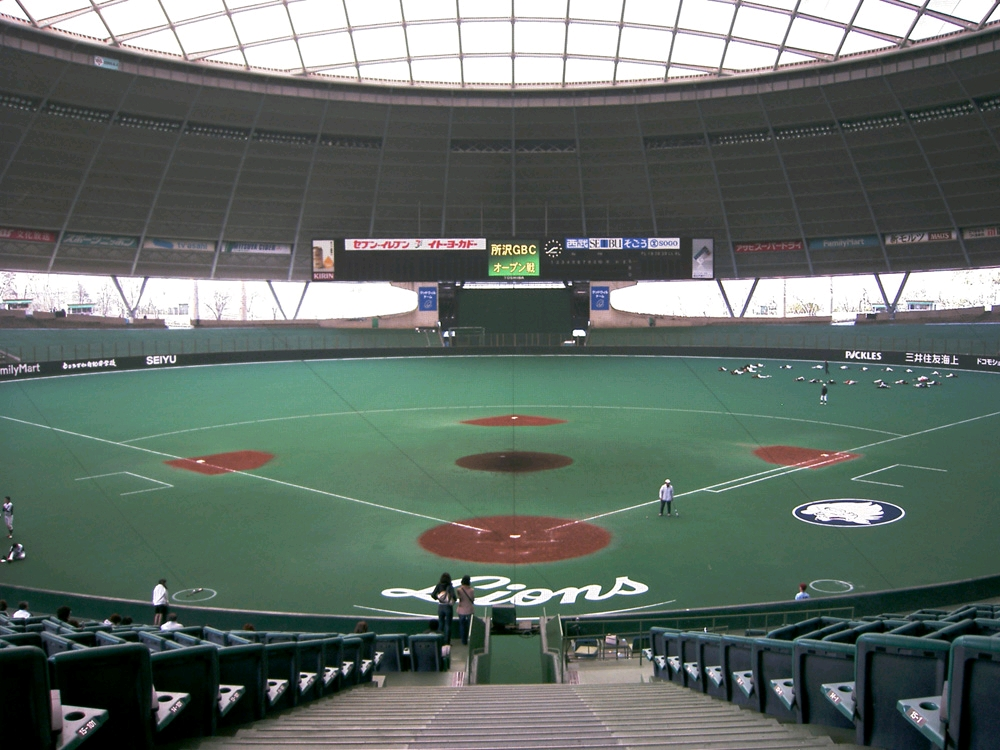
Seibu Dome artificial turf field (2007)

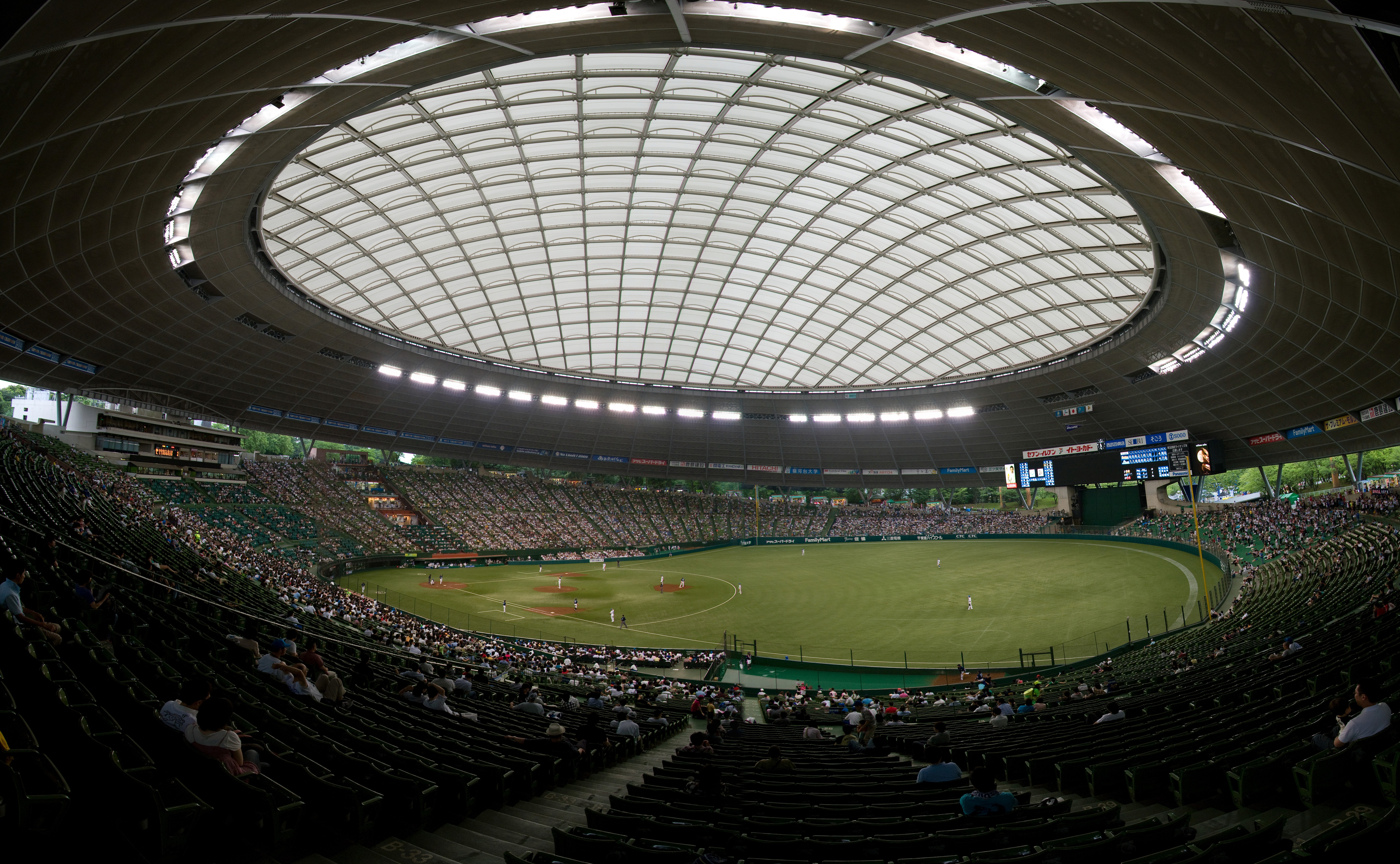
Seibu Dome panorama (2009)

== Attendances ==
The home attendances of the Saitama Seibu Lions at the Belluna Dome:

Season	Games	Total attendance	Average attendance
2025	71	1,732,073	24,395

== See also ==
- Lists of stadiums
- List of stadiums in Japan
