= Seibukyūjō-mae Station =

Railway station in Tokorozawa, Saitama Prefecture, Japan

SI41 SY03 Seibukyūjō-mae Station 西武球場前駅
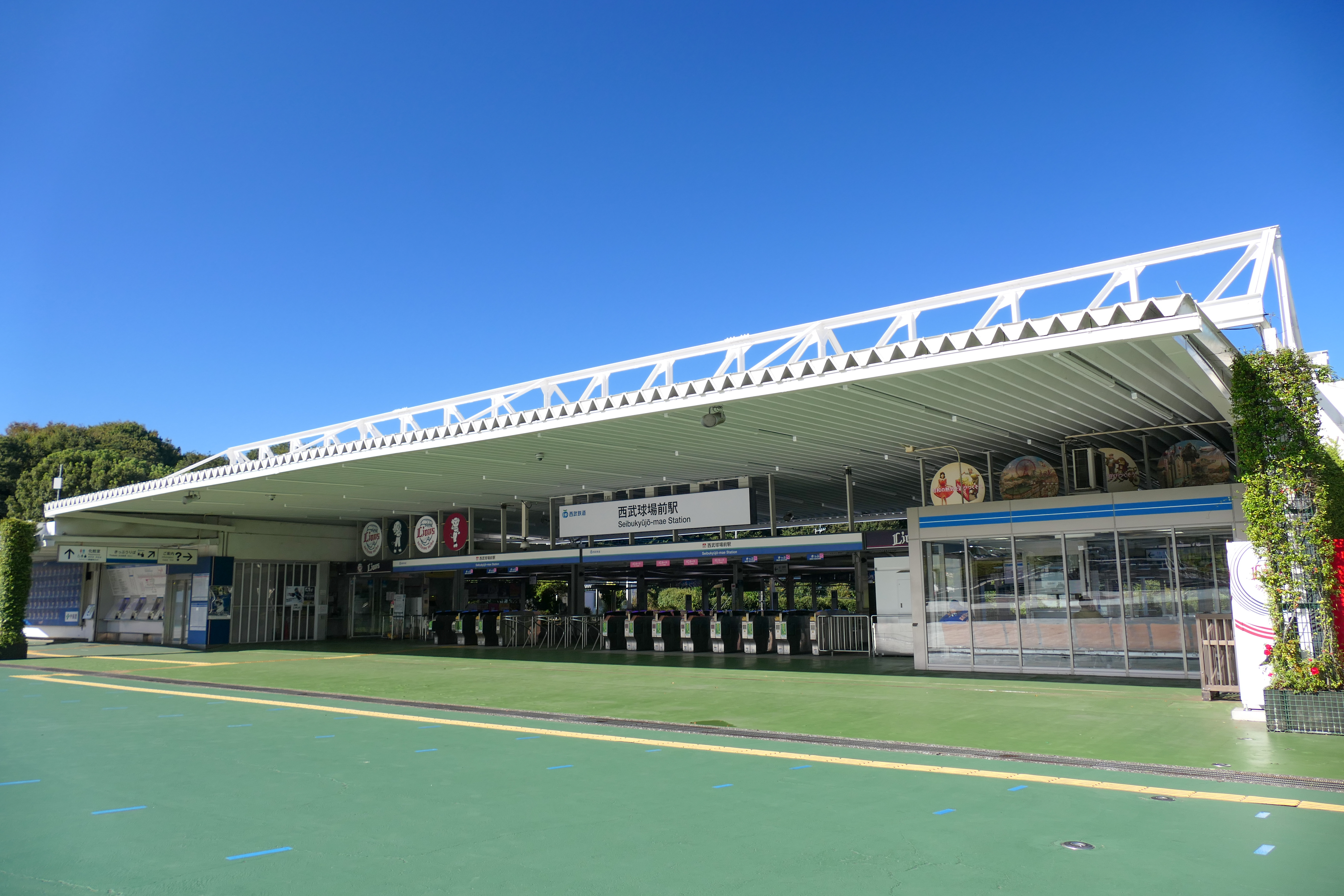
- Station entrance, October 2021

General information
- Location: 2090-3 Kamiyamaguchi, Tokorozawa-shi, Saitama-ken 359-1153; Japan
- Coordinates: 35.7707°N 139.4198°E
- Operator: Seibu Railway
- Lines: Seibu Sayama Line; Seibu Yamaguchi Line
- Platforms: 4 bay platforms
- Connections: Bus stop

Other information
- Station code: SI41, SY03
- Website: Official website

History
- Opened: 1 May 1929
- Former names: Sayamako Station (1951-1979); closed (1944-1951); Murayama Station (1941-1944); Murayama Chosuichi-giwa Station (1933-1941); Murayama-kōen Station (1929-1933)

Passengers
- FY2019: 13,830 daily

Services
Preceding station	Seibu Railway	Following station
Terminus	Sayama Line	Shimo-Yamaguchi SI40 towards Nishi-Tokorozawa
Terminus	Yamaguchi Line	Seibuen-yūenchi SY02 towards Tamako
Location
- Location within Saitama Prefecture Location within Japan

Seibukyūjō-mae Station (西武球場前駅, Seibu-Kyūjō-mae-eki) is a junction passenger railway station located in the city of Tokorozawa, Saitama, Japan, operated by the private railway operator Seibu Railway. It is located in front of the Seibu Dome, the home field of the Saitama Seibu Lions baseball team owned by Seibu Railway.

== Lines ==
Seibukyūjō-mae Station is the terminus of the 4.2 km Seibu Sayama Line from Nishi-Tokorozawa. Some through services operate to and from Ikebukuro via the Seibu Ikebukuro Line. It is also the terminus of the 2.8 km Seibu Yamaguchi Line "Leo Liner" people mover which runs from Tamako.

== Station layout ==
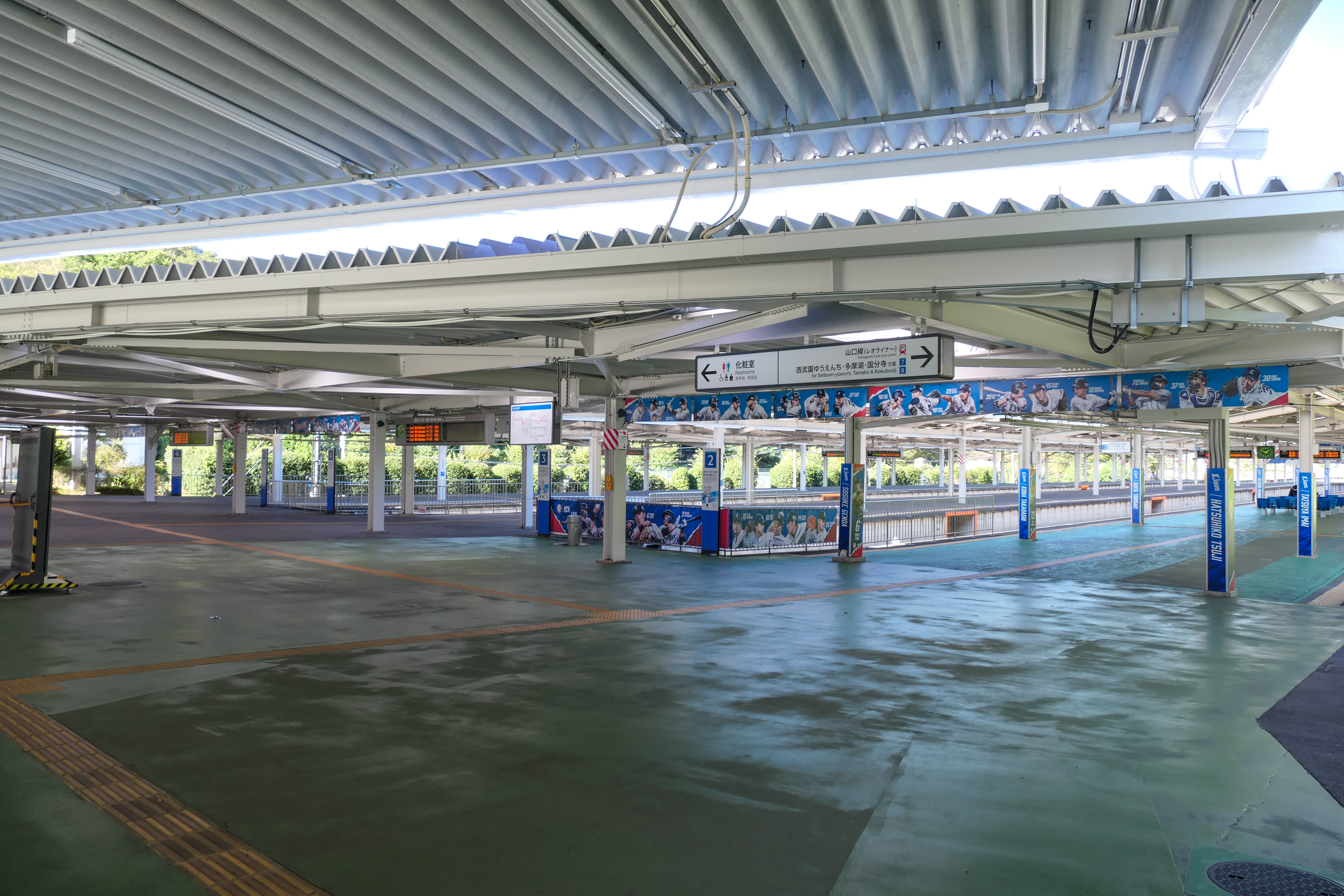
The station platforms, October 2021

The station consists of a three ground-level terminating platforms serving six tracks for the Sayama Line, and two more platforms for the Yamaguchi Line. Platforms 3 to 6 are normally used only for additional services.

=== Platforms ===
1-6	Seibu Sayama Line	for Nishi-Tokorozawa, Tokorozawa, and Ikebukuro
7-8	Seibu Yamaguchi Line	for Tamako

== History ==
The station opened on 1 May 1929 as Murayama-kōen Station (村山公園駅). This was renamed Murayama Chosuichi-giwa Station (村山貯水池際駅) on 1 March 1933, and Murayama Station (村山駅) on 1 April 1941. Service was suspended from 28 February 1944, and the station reopened on 7 October 1951 as Sayamako Station (狭山湖駅). It was renamed Seibukyūjō-mae on 25 March 1979, following the opening of the Seibu baseball stadium nearby.

Station numbering was introduced on all Seibu Railway lines during fiscal 2012, with this station becoming "SI41" on the Seibu Sayama Line and "SY03" on the Seibu Yamaguchi Line.

== Passenger statistics ==
In fiscal 2019, the station was the 62nd busiest on the Seibu network with an average of 13,830 passengers daily. The passenger figures for previous years are as shown below.

The passenger figures for the station in previous years are as shown below.

Fiscal year	Daily average
2000	8,500
2009	8,565
2010	8,723
2011	9,356

== Surrounding area ==
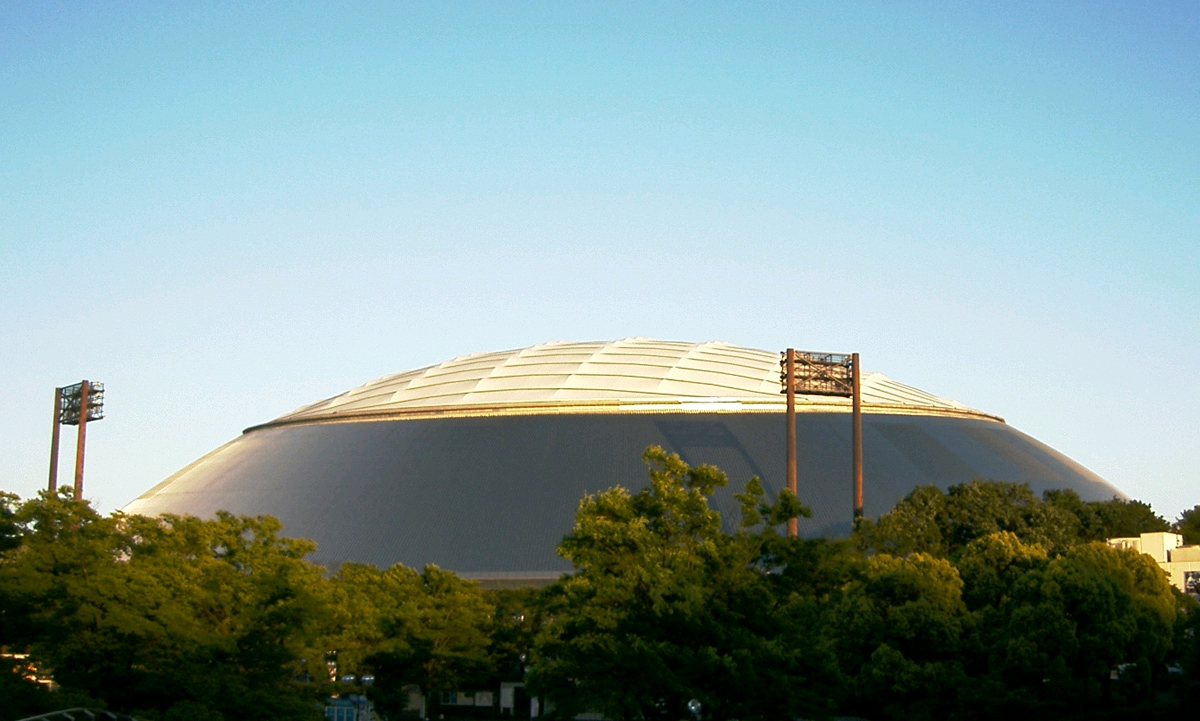
Seibu Dome baseball stadium

- Seibu Dome
- Sayama Ski Slope
- Murayama Reservoir
