= Invoice (company) =

Invoice Inc. (株式会社インボイス, Inboisu Kabushiki-gaisha) is a Japanese company. It provides consolidated invoicing for communication services to companies.

During the 2005 and 2006 baseball seasons, Invoice owned the naming rights to the Seibu Dome, which was the home stadium of the Seibu Lions baseball team and named it Invoice Seibu Dome. The company also held naming rights for the farm team.
