= Nishi-Tokorozawa Station =

Railway station in Tokorozawa, Saitama Prefecture, Japan

SI18 Nishi-Tokorozawa Station 西所沢駅
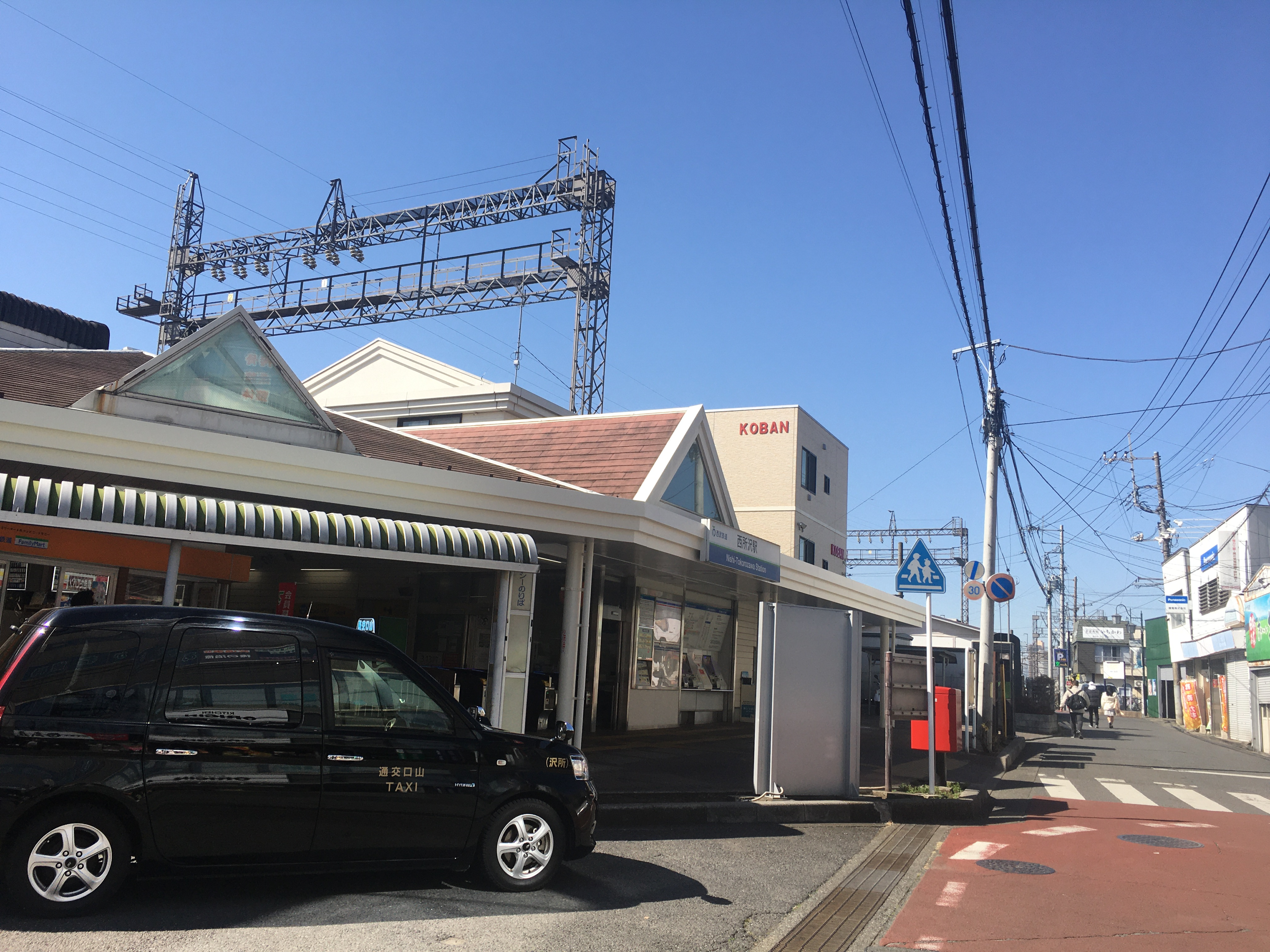
- Nishi-Tokorozawa Station, February 2021

General information
- Location: 1-11-9 Nishi-Tokorozawa, Tokorozawa-shi, Saitama-ken 359–1144; Japan
- Coordinates: 35°47′22″N 139°27′24″E
- Operator: Seibu Railway
- Lines: Seibu Ikebukuro Line; Seibu Sayama Line
- Platforms: 1 island and 1 side platform
- Connections: Bus stop

Other information
- Station code: SI18
- Website: Official website

History
- Opened: 15 April 1915
- Former names: Kotesashi (until 1915)

Passengers
- FY2019: 25,720 daily

Services
Preceding station	Seibu Railway	Following station
Kotesashi SI19 towards Hannō	Ikebukuro Line Express	Tokorozawa SI17 towards Ikebukuro
Kotesashi One-way operation	Ikebukuro Line Commuter Express	Tokorozawa SI17 towards Ikebukuro
Kotesashi SI19 towards Hannō	Ikebukuro Line Rapid	Tokorozawa SI17 towards Ikebukuro
Kotesashi One-way operation	Ikebukuro Line Commuter Semi Express	Tokorozawa SI17 towards Ikebukuro
Kotesashi SI19 towards Hannō	Ikebukuro Line Semi Express	Tokorozawa SI17 towards Ikebukuro
Kotesashi SI19 towards Agano	Ikebukuro Line Local	Tokorozawa SI17 towards Ikebukuro
Shimo-Yamaguchi SI40 towards Seibukyūjō-mae	Sayama Line	Terminus
Location
- Location within Saitama Prefecture Location within Japan

Nishi-Tokorozawa Station (西所沢駅, Nishi-Tokorozawa-eki) is a junction passenger railway station located in the city of Tokorozawa, Saitama, Japan, operated by the private railway operator Seibu Railway.

== Lines ==
Nishi-Tokorozawa Station is served by the Seibu Ikebukuro Line from Ikebukuro in Tokyo to Hannō, and by its branch, the 4.2 km Seibu Sayama Line to Seibukyūjō-mae. Nishi-Tokorozawa is located 27.2 km from the terminus of the Seibu Ikebukuro Line at Ikebukuro Station.

== Station layout ==
The station consists of two ground-level side platforms and one island platform, serving four tracks.

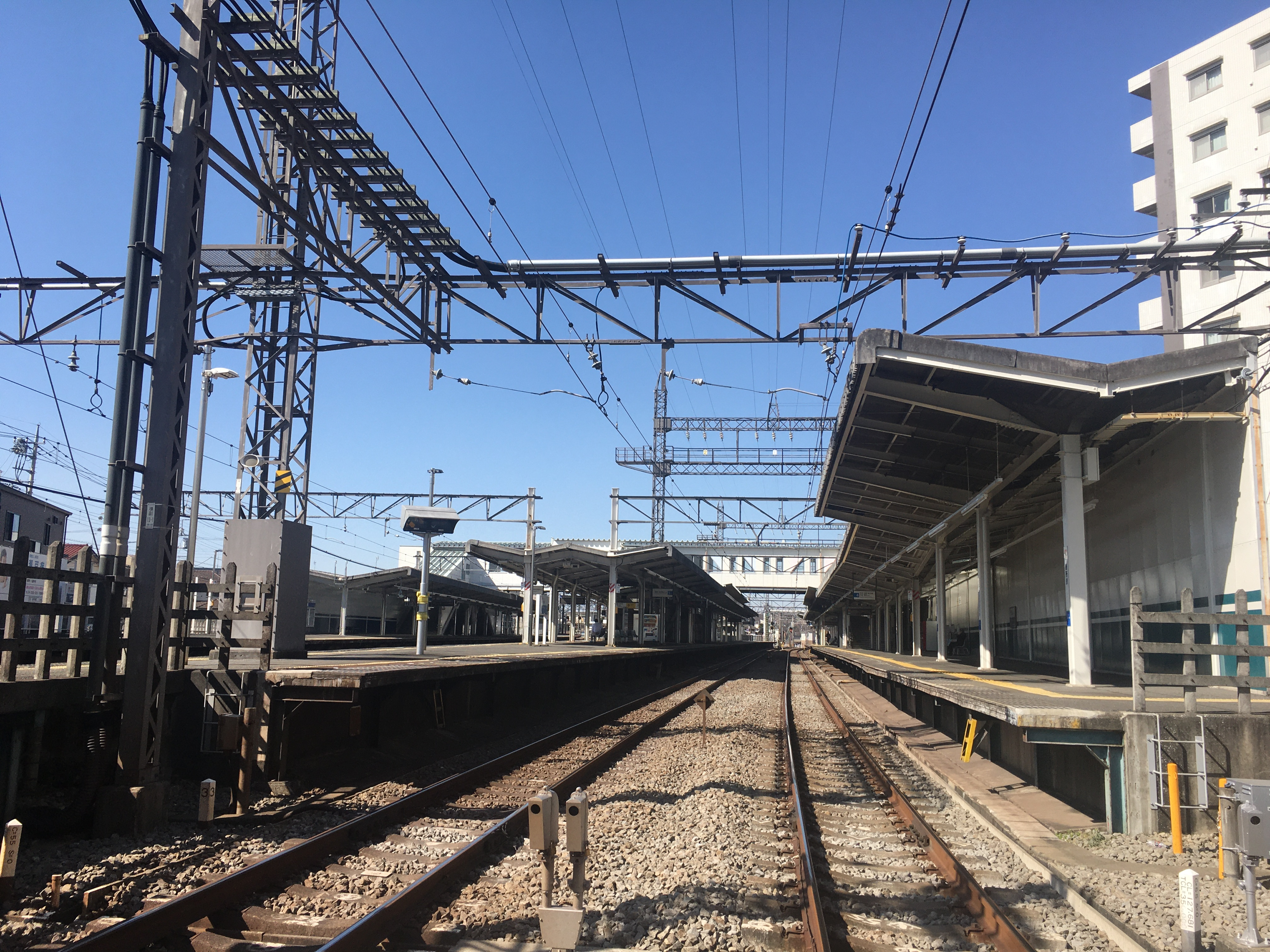
Station platforms, 2021

=== Platforms ===
Platforms 1 and 2 are bidirectional platforms used by Sayama Line services, and platforms 3 and 4 are used by Seibu Ikebukuro Line services. Through trains in the up direction from the Sayama Line to Ikebukuro normally use platform 1.

1	Seibu Sayama Line	for Seibukyūjō-mae
1	Seibu Ikebukuro Line	for Tokorozawa and Ikebukuro
2	Seibu Sayama Line	for Seibukyūjō-mae
3	Seibu Ikebukuro Line	for Hannō
4	Seibu Ikebukuro Line	for Tokorozawa, Nerima, and Ikebukuro; Tokyo Metro Yurakucho Line for Shin-Kiba; Tokyo Metro Fukutoshin Line for Shibuya; Tōkyū Tōyoko Line for Yokohama; Minatomirai Line for Motomachi-Chukagai

== History ==
The station opened on 15 April 1915 as Kotesashi Station (小手指駅). It was renamed Nishi-Tokorozawa on 1 September 1915.

Station numbering was introduced on all Seibu Railway lines during fiscal 2012, with Nishi-Tokorozawa Station becoming "SI18".

Through-running to and from Yokohama and Motomachi-Chukagai via the Tokyu Toyoko Line and Minatomirai Line commenced on 16 March 2013.

== Passenger statistics ==
In fiscal 2019, the station was the 40th busiest on the Seibu network with an average of 25,720 passengers daily.

The passenger figures for the station in previous years are as shown below.

Fiscal year	Daily average
2000	24,154
2009	24,393
2010	23,904
2011	23,863
2012	24,112
2013	24,473

== Surrounding area ==
- Saitama Prefectural Tokorozawa High School
- National Route 463
