= Seibu Sayama Line =

Railway line in Saitama Prefecture, Japan

Sayama Line
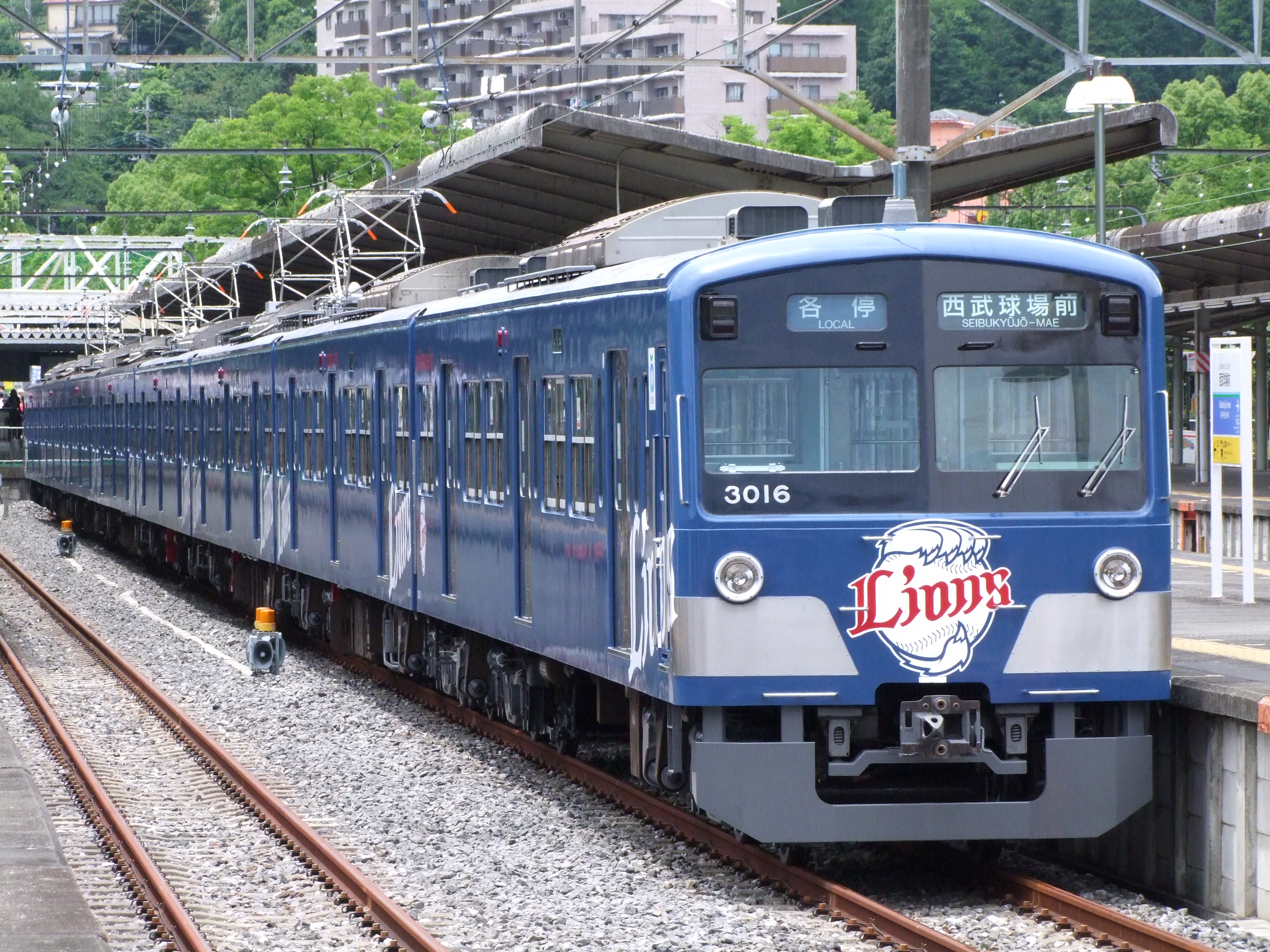
- Decorated 3000 series EMU at Seibukyūjō-mae Station, July 2010

Overview
- Native name: 狭山線
- Owner: Seibu Railway
- Locale: Saitama Prefecture
- Termini: Nishi-Tokorozawa; Seibukyūjō-mae
- Stations: 3

Service
- Type: Commuter rail

History
- Opened: 1 May 1929; 96 years ago

Technical
- Line length: 4.2 km (2.6 mi)
- Track gauge: 1,067 mm (3 ft 6 in)
- Electrification: 1,500 V DC, overhead catenary
- Operating speed: 95 km/h (60 mph)

The Sayama Line (狭山線, Seibu Sayama-sen) is a commuter railway line in Saitama Prefecture, Japan, operated by the private railway operator Seibu Railway. The 4.2 km (2.6 mi) line extends from Nishi-Tokorozawa Station on the Seibu Ikebukuro Line to Seibukyūjō-mae Station in Tokorozawa, Saitama.

== Stations and service pattern ==
All stations are located in Tokorozawa, Saitama. Abbreviations here are for the table below, not formally used.

Local (各停, Kakutei) Stops at all stations.

Semi-Express (準急, Junkyū) (SE)

Rapid (快速, Kaisoku) (Ra)

Express (急行, Kyūkō) (Ex)

Limited Express (特急, Tokkyū) (LE) :Ikebukuro to Seibu Chichibu, trains named Chichibu (ちちぶ), Musashi (むさし), with supplementary limited express charge.

| No. | Station | Japanese | Distance (km) | | SE | Ra | Ex | LE | Transfers |
| No. | Station | Japanese | to Nishi-Tokorozawa | to Ikebukuro | SE | Ra | Ex | LE | Transfers |
|---|---|---|---|---|---|---|---|---|---|
| | Nishi-Tokorozawa | 西所沢 | 0.0 | 27.2 | O | O | O | | | Ikebukuro Line |
| | Shimo-Yamaguchi | 下山口 | 1.8 | 29.0 | O | O | O | | | |
| | Seibukyūjō-mae | 西武球場前 | 4.2 | 31.4 | O | O | O | O | Yamaguchi Line (Leo Liner) |

== History ==
The line and its two stations opened on 1 May 1929, initially electrified at 1,200 V DC. This was raised to 1,500 V DC in 1952.

Station numbering was introduced on all Seibu Railway lines during fiscal 2012, with Seibu Sayama Line stations numbered prefixed with the letters "SI" (part of the Seibu Ikebukuro group of lines).
