= Seibu Yamaguchi Line =

Rubber-tyred people mover in Saitama, Japan

Yamaguchi Line

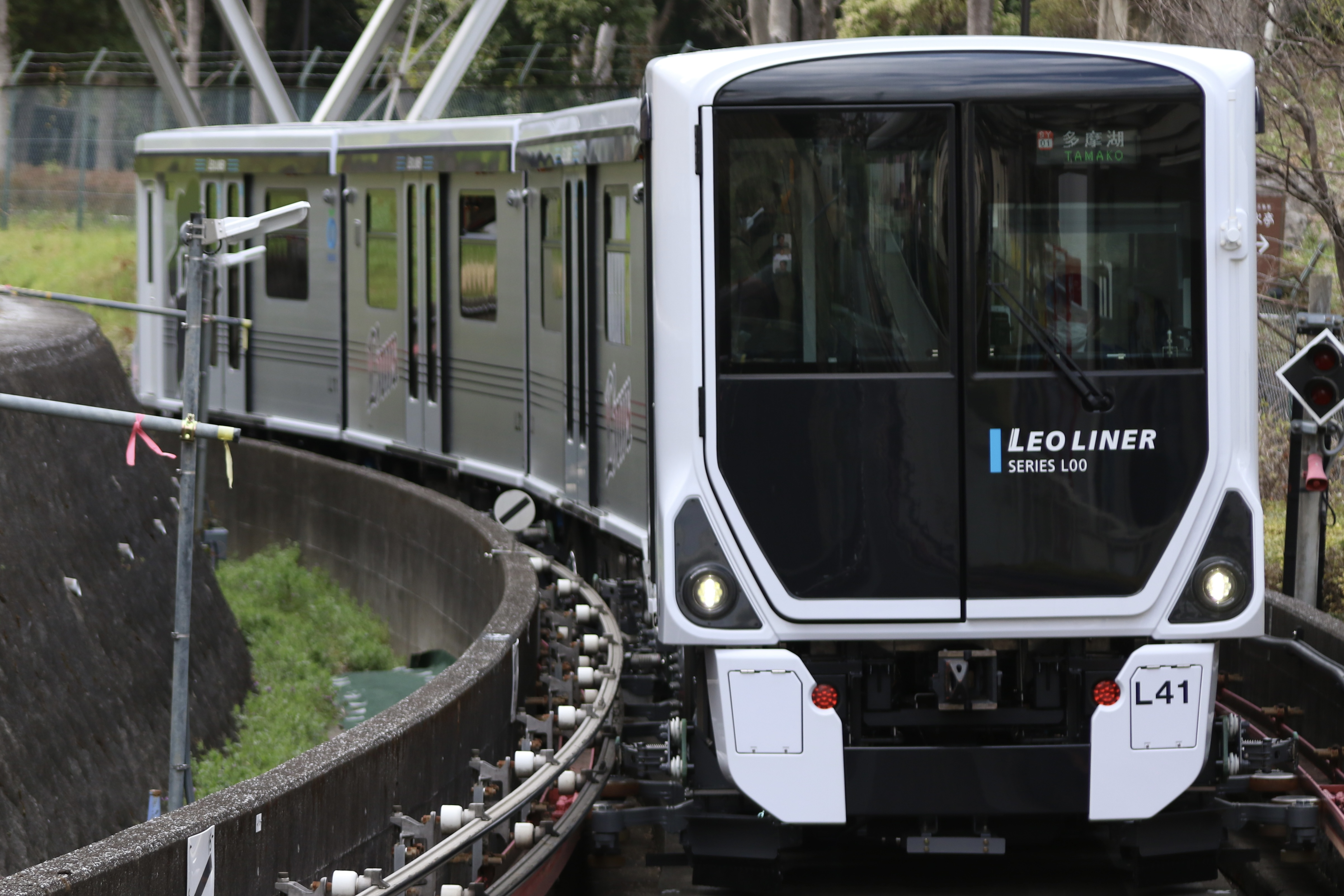
- L00 series of Yamaguchi Line

Overview
- Other name: Leo Liner
- Native name: 山口線
- Status: In service
- Owner: Seibu Railway Co., Ltd.
- Locale: Tokyo, Saitama Prefecture
- Termini: Seibukyūjō-mae; Tamako
- Stations: 3

Service
- Type: People mover
- System: Seibu Railway
- Rolling stock: 3 Seibu 8500 series EMUs

History
- Opened: 1950
- Reopened: 1985-04-25 (as People Mover)

Technical
- Line length: 2.8 km (1.7 mi)
- Number of tracks: 1
- Track gauge: 1,700 mm (5 ft 7 in)
- Electrification: Conductor rail, 750 V DC
- Operating speed: 50 km/h (31 mph)

The Yamaguchi Line (Japanese: 山口線, Hepburn: Yamaguchi-sen) of Seibu Railway is a 2.8-kilometre (1.7 mi) manually operated, rubber-tyred people mover that runs between Tamako in Higashimurayama, Tokyo and Seibukyūjō-mae in Tokorozawa, Saitama in Japan. The line has an official nickname Leo Liner, after 'Leo', the hero of Kimba the White Lion, who is also the mascot of Saitama Seibu Lions baseball team. The line is the only people mover that is operated by one of Japan's major private railway companies.

== History ==
In 1950, the predecessor of the line opened as an attraction ride called Fantasy Train (おとぎ列車, Otogi Ressha), running through the amusement area developed by Seibu Railway and its allies. Battery-powered locomotives were used at the time, running on 762 mm (2 ft 6 in) gauge track. In 1952, it legally became a train line, with the official name Seibu Yamaguchi Line. In 1984, the steam and battery powered railway closed for the line to be converted to a people mover. The next year, the new people mover line opened, mostly along the same route.

To reduce costs, the line was built to be manually operated.

== Rolling stock ==
=== Current ===
From the opening of the people mover line in 1985, the line has operated 3 four-car Seibu 8500 series trains.

=== Future ===
On January 22, 2025, Seibu Railway and Mitsubishi Heavy Industries both announced a new order for 3 four-car trains to replace the 8500 series. Designated as the L00 series, the first of these sets is expected to enter service in March 2026.

The trains, to be built between and 2025 and 2027, will "boost capacity and improve passenger convenience" and "respond to diverse passenger needs through the addition of wheelchair spaces, children's seats, and information displays". The trains will consist mostly of longitudinal seats (referred to in Japan as "long seats"), instead of the transverse seats ("cross seats") fitted to the 8500 series, to maximise capacity during baseball games and concerts at Belluna Dome. The first trainset will represent the Saitama Seibu Lions baseball team, with the interior featuring the team's colours and the exterior of the first car will have a large image of the line's mascot Leo.

== Services ==
All services on the Seibu Yamaguchi Line are Local trains, stopping at all stations.

As of January 2025, services run every 20-30 minutes. The line operates between approximately 7am and 10:30pm every day, with a running time of 7-8 minutes.

During major sporting events and concerts at venues along the line, trains operate every 10 minutes with trains passing on the single-track line at Higashi-Nakamine signal station where a passing loop is installed.

== Stations ==
No.	Station name	Transfers	Nearest facilities	Location
SY01	Tamako 多摩湖	Tamako Line	Seibuen Golf Course, (Note: Seibuen Station on Seibu Seibuen Line is closer.) Seibuen Keirin Course, Tama Lake (Murayama Reservoir)	Higashimurayama, Tokyo
SY02	Seibuen-yūenchi 西武園ゆうえんち		Seibuen Amusement Park	Tokorozawa, Saitama
SY03	Seibukyūjō-mae 西武球場前	Sayama Line	Seibu Dome, Sayama Lakeside Cemetery, Sayama Ski Resort, Seibu Dome Tennis Court, "Unesco Village" (Lily Park)	Tokorozawa, Saitama
