= Seibu Railway =

Japanese railway company

Seibu Railway Co., Ltd.
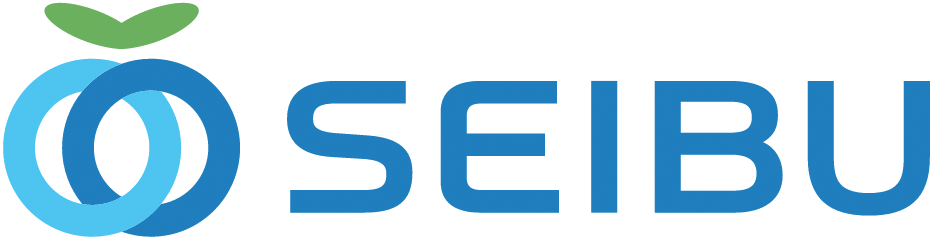
- Native name: 西武鉄道株式会社
- Romanized name: Seibu Tetsudō Kabushiki-gaisha
- Type: Private KK
- Industry: Private railroad
- Founded: December 21, 1894; 131 years ago
- Headquarters: 1-1-1 Kusunokidai, Tokorozawa, Saitama, Saitama Prefecture, Japan
- Area served: Tokyo; Saitama Prefecture
- Key people: Takashi Goto (president and CEO)
- Services: passenger railways other related services
- Owner: Seibu Holdings (100%)
- Number of employees: 3,289 (as of the end of 2004)
- Website: www.seiburailway.jp

Seibu Railway Company, Ltd. (西武鉄道株式会社, Seibu Tetsudō Kabushiki-gaisha) is a conglomerate based in Tokorozawa, Saitama, Japan, with principal business areas in railways, tourism, and real estate. Seibu Railway's operations are concentrated in northwest Tokyo and Saitama Prefecture; the name "Seibu" is an abbreviation of "west Musashi", referring to the historic name for this area. It and its holding company hold shares of numerous bus, hotel and tourism operations nationwide.

== History ==
"Seibu Railway" was originally the name of a tram service between Shinjuku and Ogikubo, which was transferred to the Tokyo metropolitan government in 1951 and eventually closed in 1962. The Seibu Railway was acquired in 1921 by the Kawagoe Railway, which had operated a train service between Kokubunji and Kawagoe since 1894; the merged company kept the "Seibu" name and expanded its main line to Takadanobaba, forming what is now known as the Seibu Shinjuku Line.

The current Seibu Railway is a product of a 1945 merger between the former Seibu Railway and the Musashino Railway, which was founded in 1912 to operate what is now known as the Seibu Ikebukuro Line. The merger was largely orchestrated by Yasujirō Tsutsumi, a real estate developer who opened the Tamako Railway (now the Seibu Tamako Line) in 1928, became a major shareholder in the Musashino Railway and merged the two in 1940.

In 1944, the Tokyo metropolitan government, under the administration of Shigeo Ōdachi, hired the Seibu Railway and the Musashino Railway to provide a coordinated service to transport night soil from central Tokyo to outlying disposal areas. At the time, night soil was generally transported by truck to Tokyo Bay and disposed of by dumping there, but the progress of World War II led to gasoline and personnel shortages which made this system unsustainable. The sewage service continued through the American occupation until 1951. As a result of this service cooperation, Seibu Railway merged with Musashino Railway to form the current Seibu Railway, effective in September 1945. Tokyu Group president Keita Goto had an intense personal rivalry with Tsutsumi, and unsuccessfully attempted to block both Tsutsumi's takeover of the Musashino Railway and its merger with the Seibu Railway.

The former Seibu network based around Shinjuku and the former Musashino network based around Ikebukuro remain operationally separated today. In 1986, Seibu Railway moved its headquarters from the Ikebukuro area to Tokorozawa, Saitama, where the two main Seibu lines intersect.

Tsutsumi became the controlling shareholder in Seibu Railway following the merger through his holding company Kokudo Corporation. After gaining control of Seibu, Kokudo developed the Prince Hotels chain, acquired the baseball team now known as the Saitama Seibu Lions, in addition to continuing its core real estate business throughout the Tokyo area. Seibu Railway had its initial public offering on the Tokyo Stock Exchange in 1949 but remained under the control of Tsutsumi through Kokudo.

Station numbering was introduced on all Seibu Railway lines during fiscal 2012.

=== Delisting and takeover struggle ===
Tsutsumi registered Seibu Railway shares owned by Kokudo in the names of various affiliated individuals, often without their permission, so that the true ownership of the company was not readily apparent. Following the death of Tsutsumi in 1964, his third son Yoshiaki Tsutsumi inherited control of Kokudo and continued the practice of falsifying shareholder records. His holdings in Kokudo and Seibu led to his being deemed the "world's richest man" by Forbes magazine for four consecutive years from 1987 to 1990, with estimated net worth of $15–20 billion during the height of the Japanese asset bubble. He was arrested on securities fraud charges in March 2005.

On December 21, 2005, Seibu Railway was delisted from the Tokyo Stock Exchange. A reorganization of the group, completed in February 2006, created Seibu Holdings to act as a holding company for both the railway and Prince Hotels. Cerberus Capital Management, an American investment fund, became the largest shareholder in Seibu Holdings with a 29.9% share of the new company.

In late 2012 and early 2013, Cerberus proposed that Seibu Railway abolish five non-core lines, along with other restructuring measures throughout the Seibu Holdings group, but management refused to implement these changes. Cerberus then executed a tender offer to increase its stake to 35% as of June 2013, giving Cerberus the power to veto shareholder resolutions. Cerberus had aimed to raise its stake to 44%, bringing it closer to an outright majority, but Seibu management engaged in a massive campaign to thwart the tender offer, including advertising within Seibu trains to passengers who owned stock. The East Japan Railway Company and several financial institutions also planned a support scheme to keep Cerberus from acquiring control of Seibu, but it was ultimately not implemented due to a lack of potential financial benefit for the investors. At the June 2013 shareholder meeting, several proposals by Cerberus were voted down, including the election of outside directors and the abolition of non-core lines.

As of June 2013, Yoshiaki Tsutsumi remains a major investor in Seibu Holdings through his 36% investment in NW Corporation, the second-largest shareholder in the company with a share of around 15%. Tsutsumi refused to respond to the Cerberus tender offer at the urging of Seibu management.

== Railway operations ==
Map of Seibu network

As of June 2017, Seibu's routes total 176.6 km (109.7 mi). They fall into two separate groups. Tokorozawa Station is the crossing point of Ikebukuro Line and Shinjuku Line.

Seibu Railway is well known for its bright yellow colored trains. However, more recent trains have a blue colored line on unpainted stainless steel or aluminium bodies.

=== Ikebukuro Line Group ===
The Ikebukuro Line group includes the Ikebukuro Line and its branches.

Line	Code	Route	Length	Stops
Ikebukuro Line		Ikebukuro — Tokorozawa — Hannō — Agano Provides direct through service via the Seibu Yūrakuchō Line to: Motomachi-Chūkagai on the Minatomirai Line via the Tokyo Metro Fukutoshin Line and the Tōkyū Tōyoko Line; Shin-Kiba on the Tokyo Metro Yūrakuchō Line	57.8 km (35.9 mi)	31
Seibu Chichibu Line		Agano — Seibu-Chichibu	19.0 km (11.8 mi)	6
Seibu Yūrakuchō Line		Nerima — Kotake-mukaihara Connects the Ikebukuro Line and the Tokyo Metro system	2.6 km (1.6 mi)	3
Toshima Line		Nerima — Toshimaen	1.0 km (0.62 mi)	2
Sayama Line		Nishi-Tokorozawa — Seibukyūjō-mae	4.2 km (2.6 mi)	3

=== Shinjuku Line Group ===
The Shinjuku Line group includes the Shinjuku Line and its branches, as well as the Tamagawa Line, which is not a branch of the Shinjuku Line but had been owned by the Shinjuku Line's operator before its merger with the Ikebukuro Line operator.

Line	Code	Route	Length	Stops
Shinjuku Line		Seibu-Shinjuku — Tokorozawa — Hon-Kawagoe	47.5 km (29.5 mi)	29
Haijima Line		Kodaira — Haijima	14.3 km (8.9 mi)	8
Seibuen Line		Higashi-Murayama — Seibuen	2.4 km (1.5 mi)	2
Kokubunji Line		Kokubunji — Ogawa — Higashi-Murayama	7.8 km (4.8 mi)	5
Tamako Line		Kokubunji — Hagiyama — Tamako	9.2 km (5.7 mi)	7
Tamagawa Line		Musashi-Sakai — Koremasa	8.0 km (5.0 mi)	6

Until May 31, 2017, this list included the Seibu Ahina Line. Prior to the formal closure, the 3.2 km (2.0 mi) freight line between Minami-Ōtsuka Station and Ahina Station had suspended operation since 1963.

=== People mover (rubber-tyred, manually driven) ===
Line	Code	Route	Length	Stops
Yamaguchi Line "Leo Liner"		Tamako — Seibukyūjō-mae Connects the Seibu Tamako Line with the Seibu Sayama Line	2.8 km (1.7 mi)	3

== Rolling stock ==
As of 1 April 2015, Seibu operates a fleet of 1,274 electric multiple unit (EMU) vehicles.

=== Limited Express EMUs ===
- Seibu 001 series (since 2019)
- Seibu 10000 series (since 1993)

=== Commuter EMUs ===
- Seibu 101 series (since 1969)
- Seibu 2000 series (since 1977)
- Seibu 4000 series (since 1988)
- Seibu 6000 series (since 1992)
- Seibu 8000 series (formerly Odakyu 8000 series) (since May 2025)
- Seibu 9000 series (since 1993)
- Seibu 20000 series (since 2000)
- Seibu 30000 series (since 2008)
- Seibu 40000 series (since March 2017)
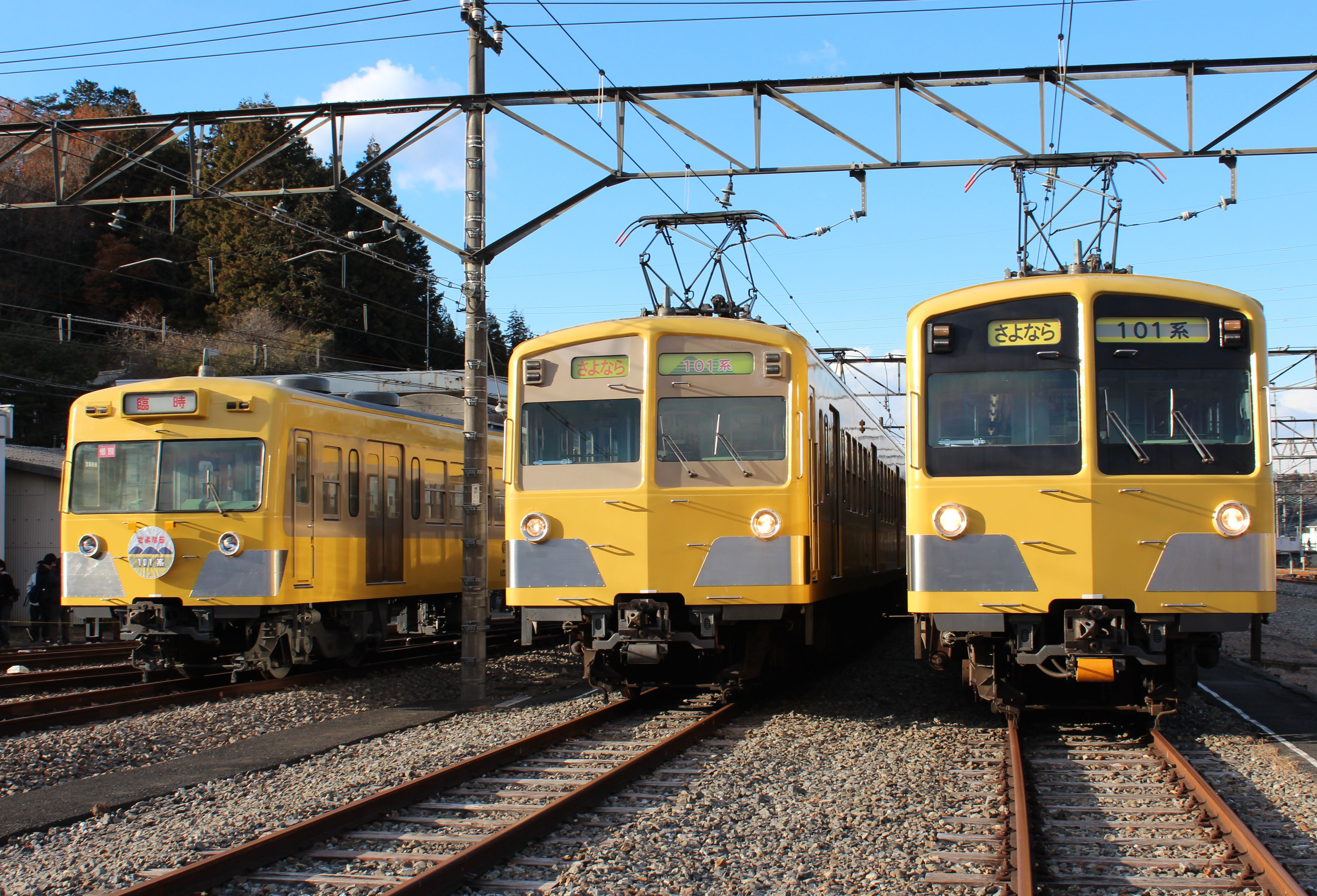
101 series

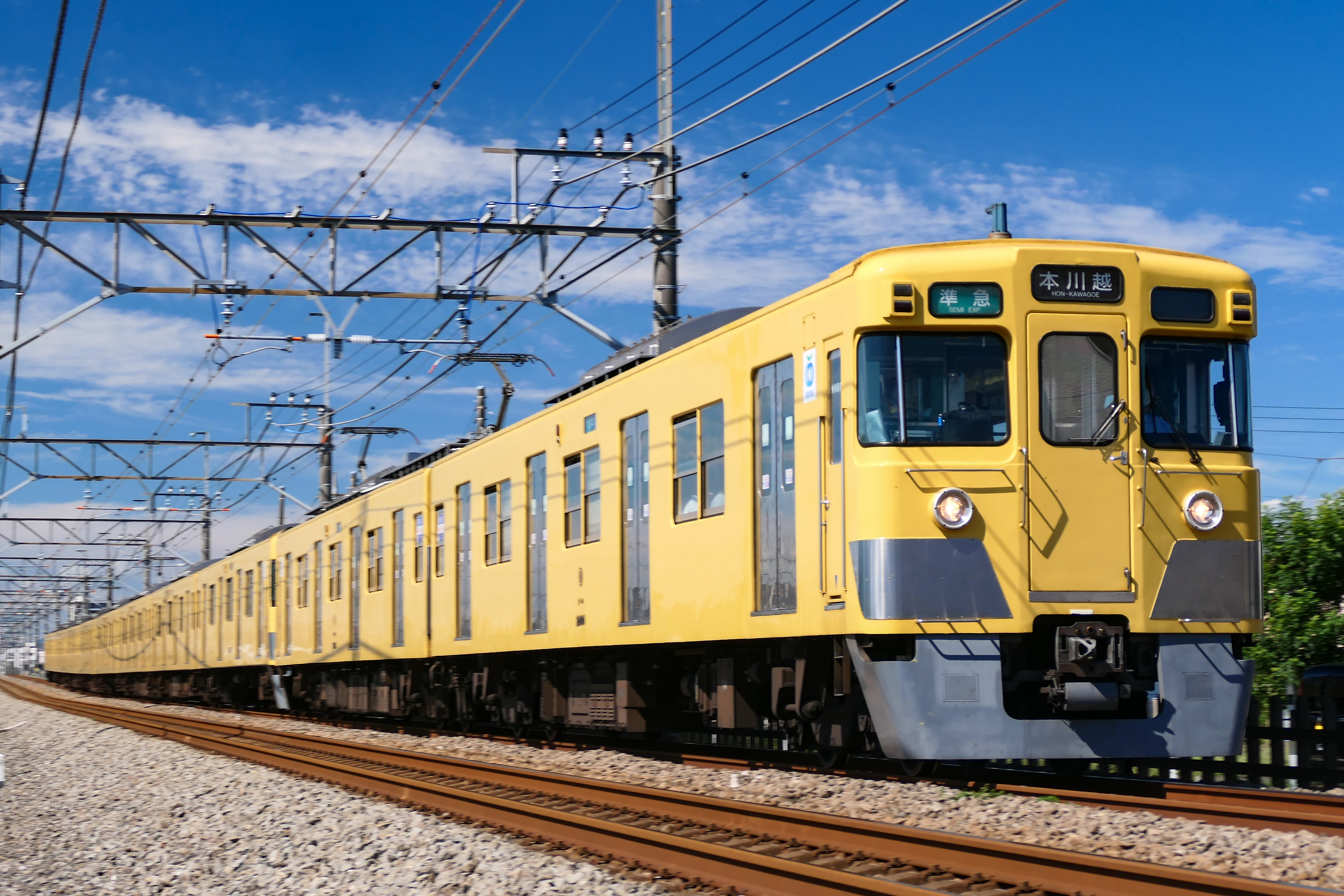
2000 series

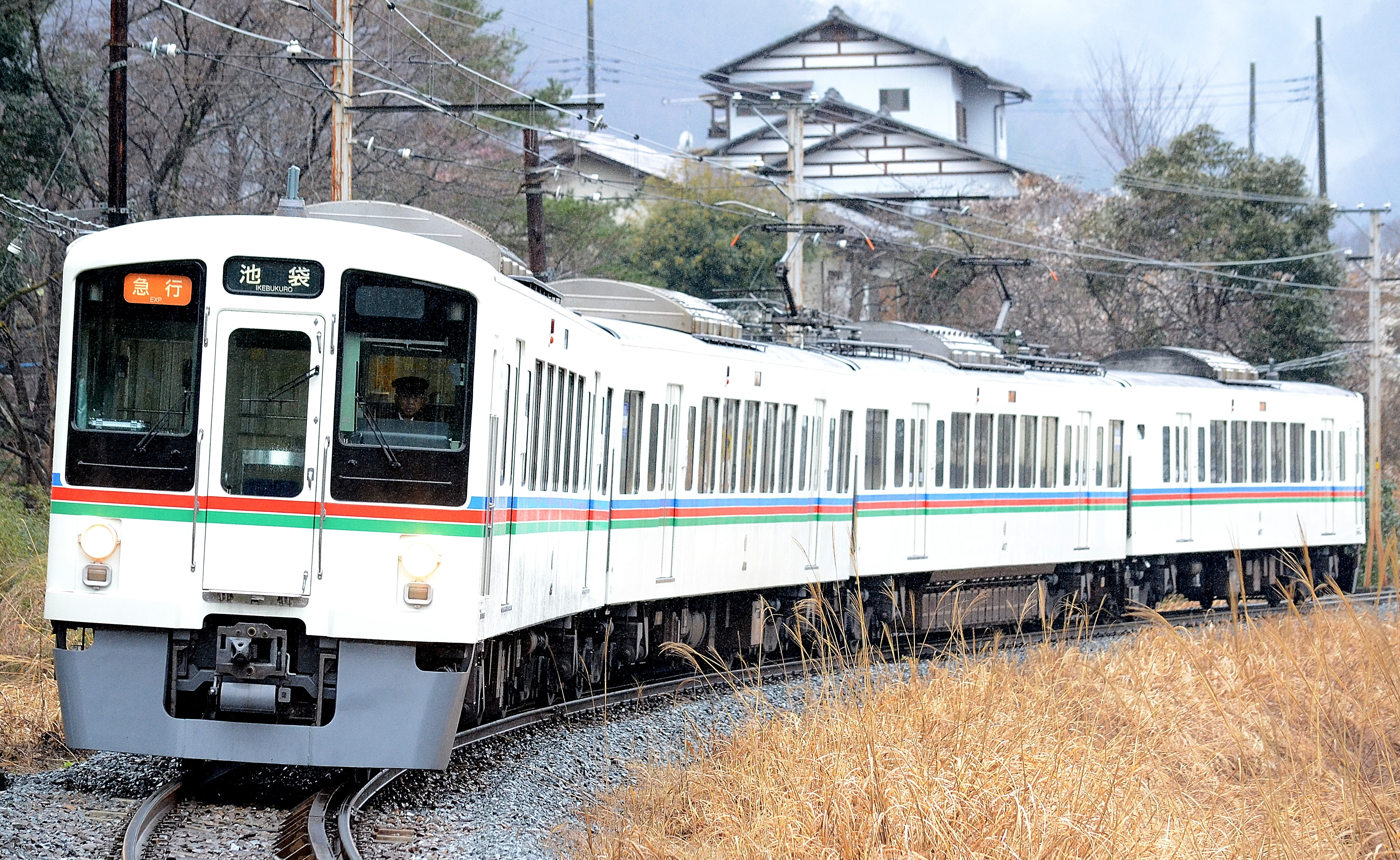
4000 series

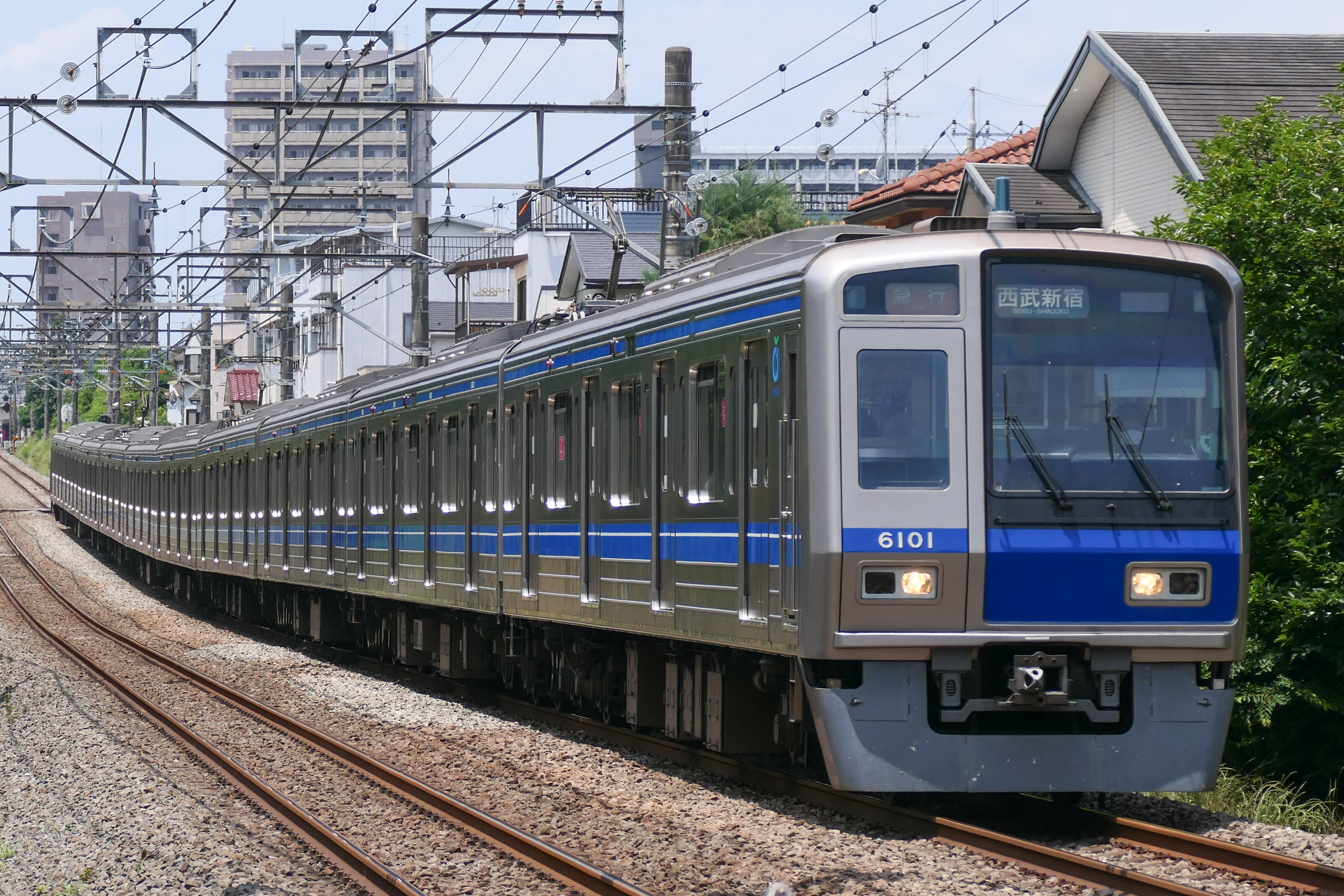
6000 series

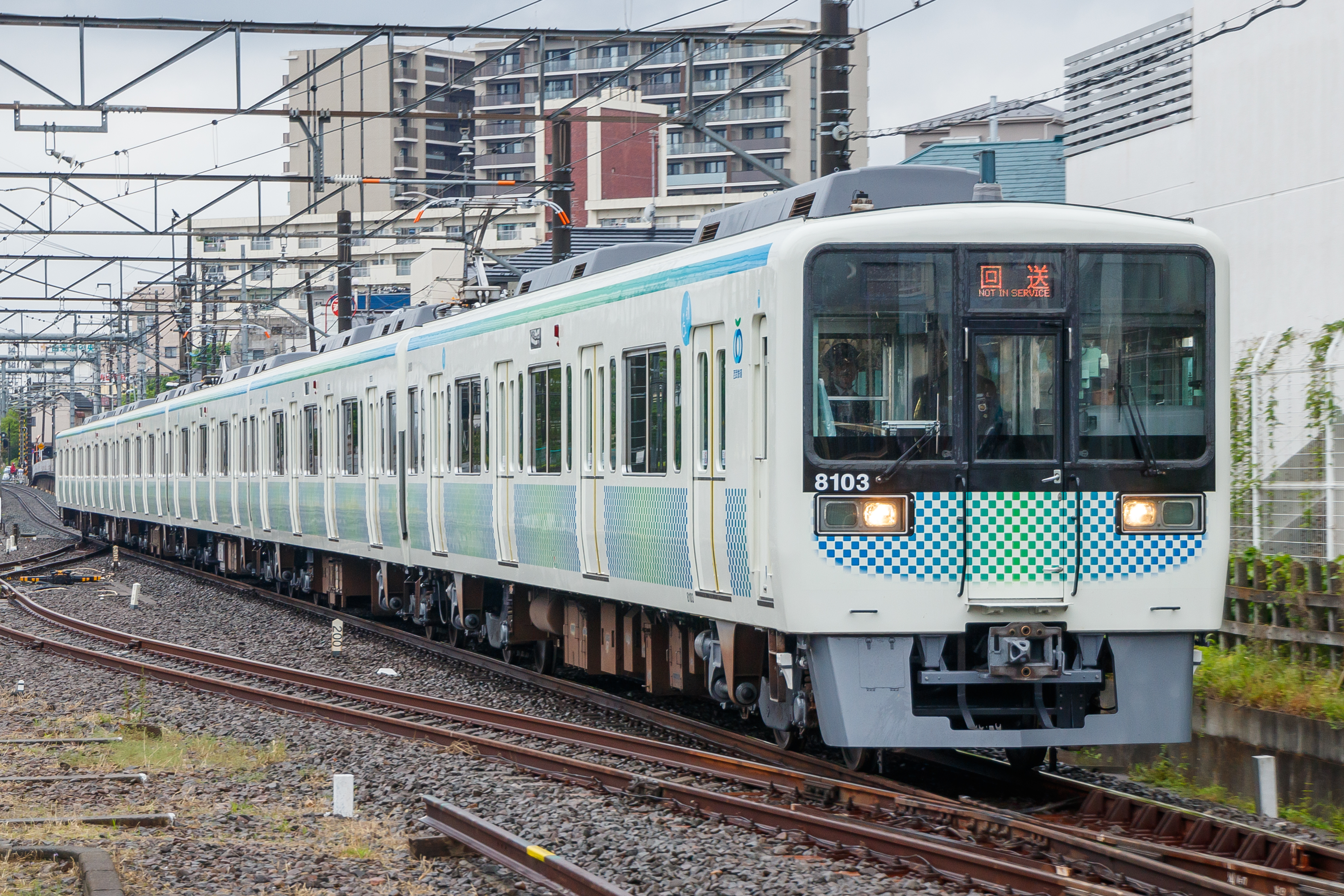
8000 series

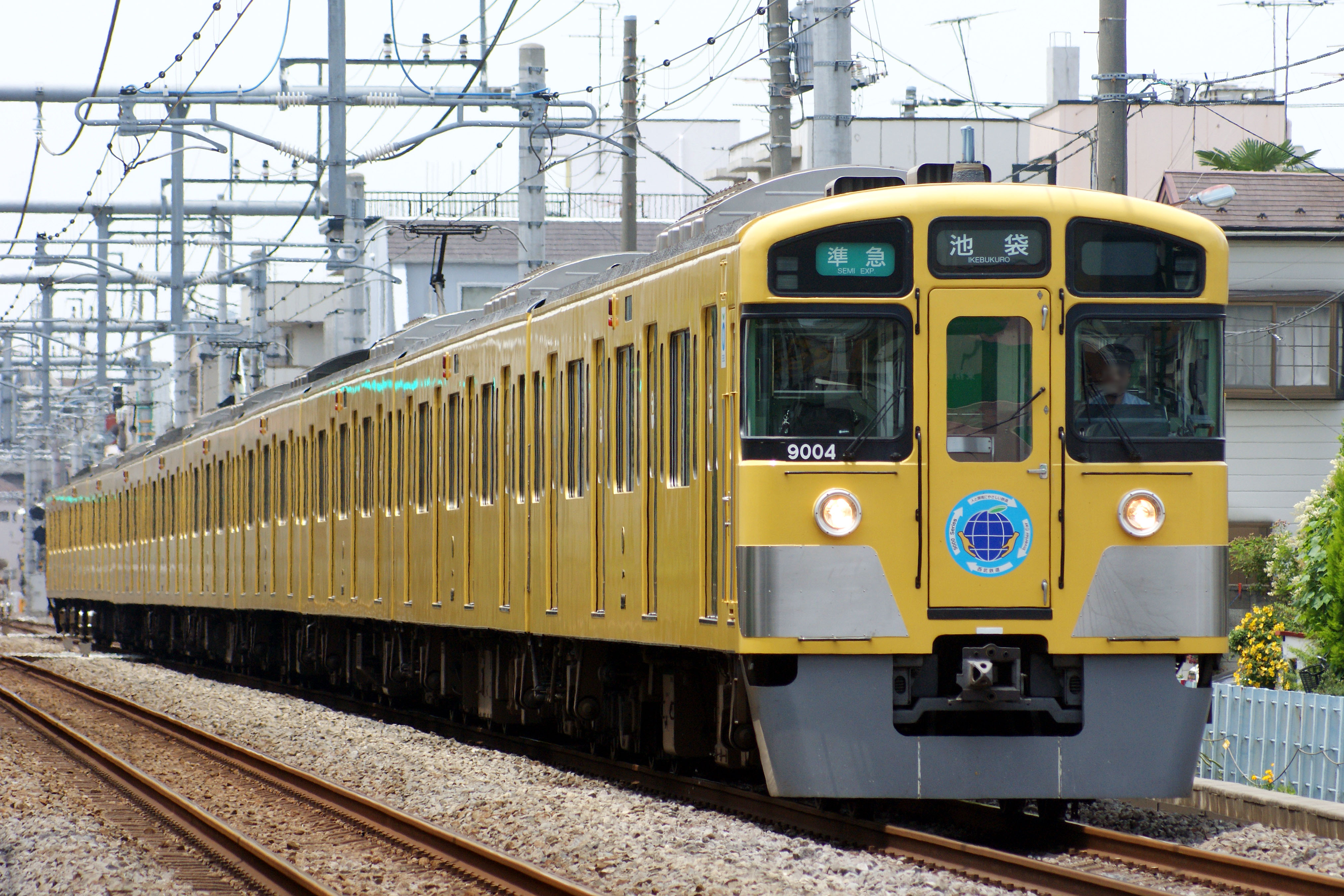
9000 series

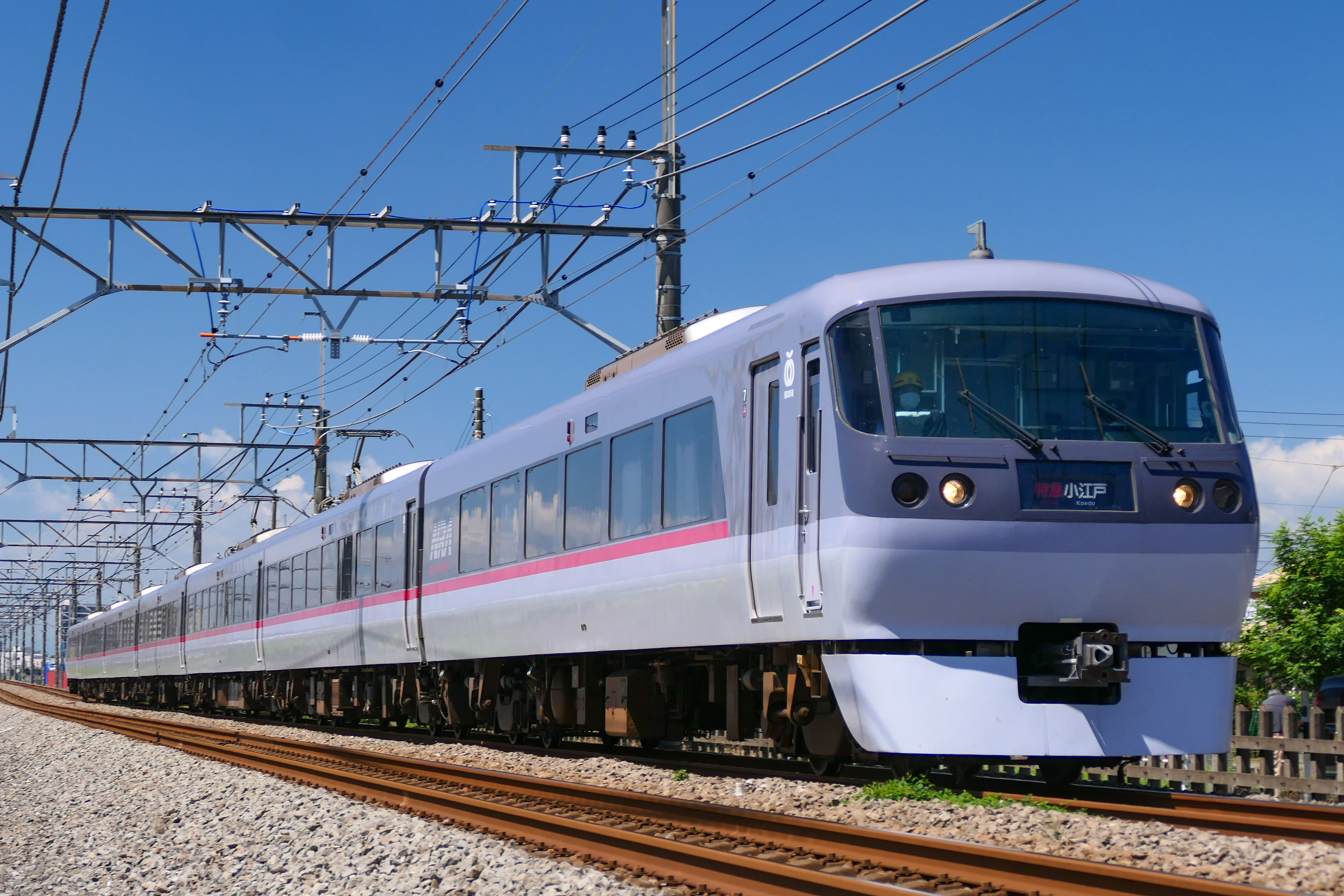
10000 series

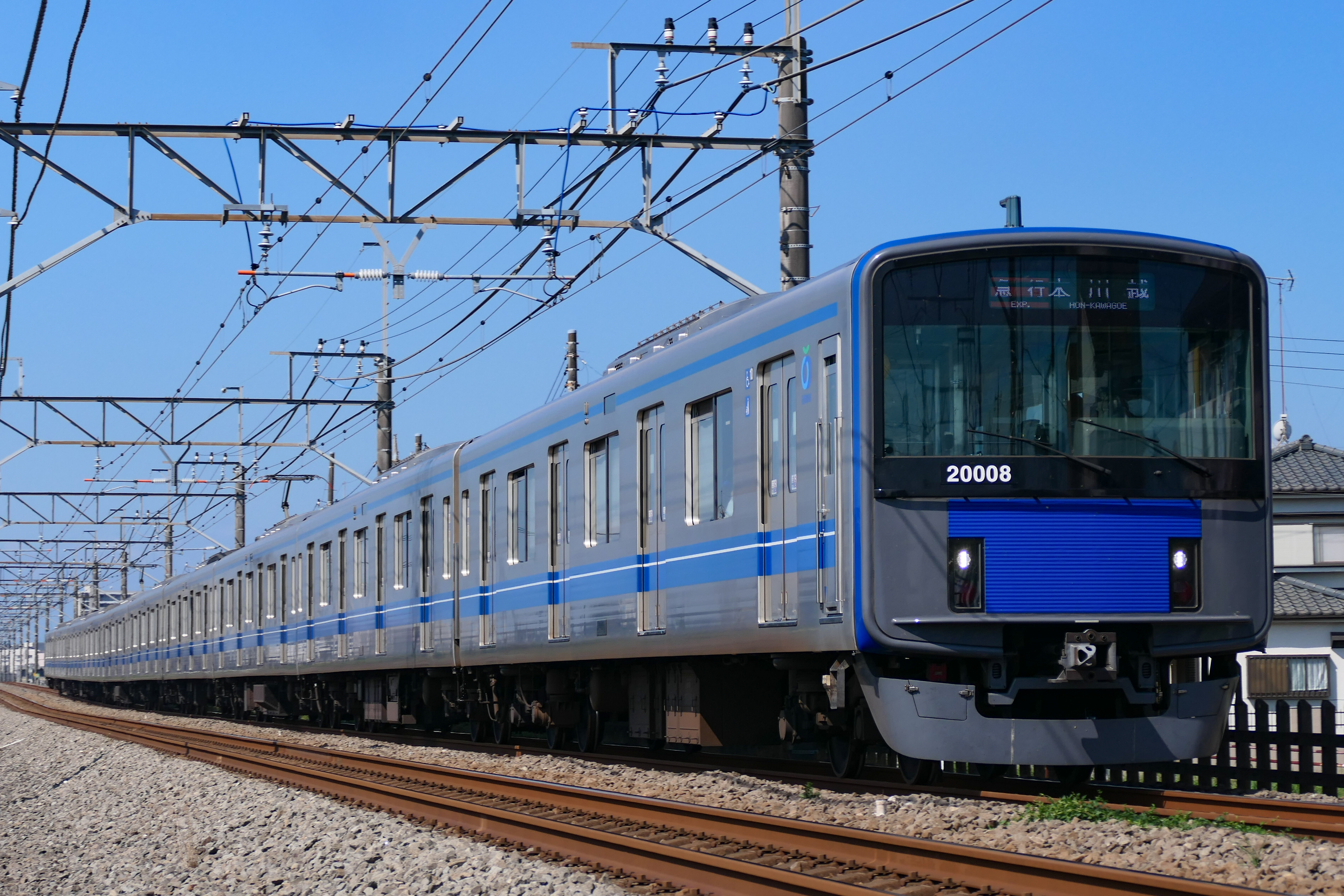
20000 series

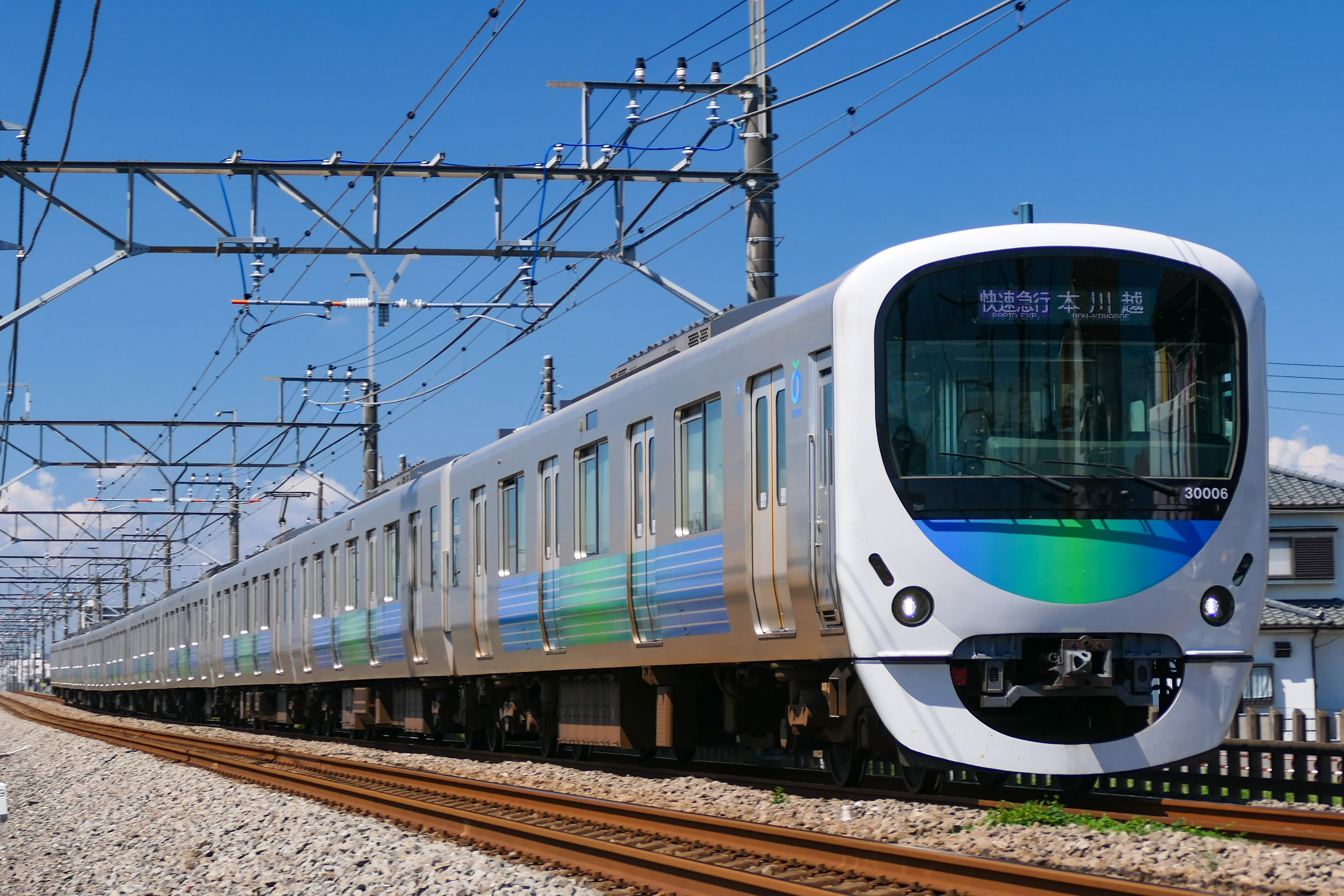
30000 series "Smile Train"

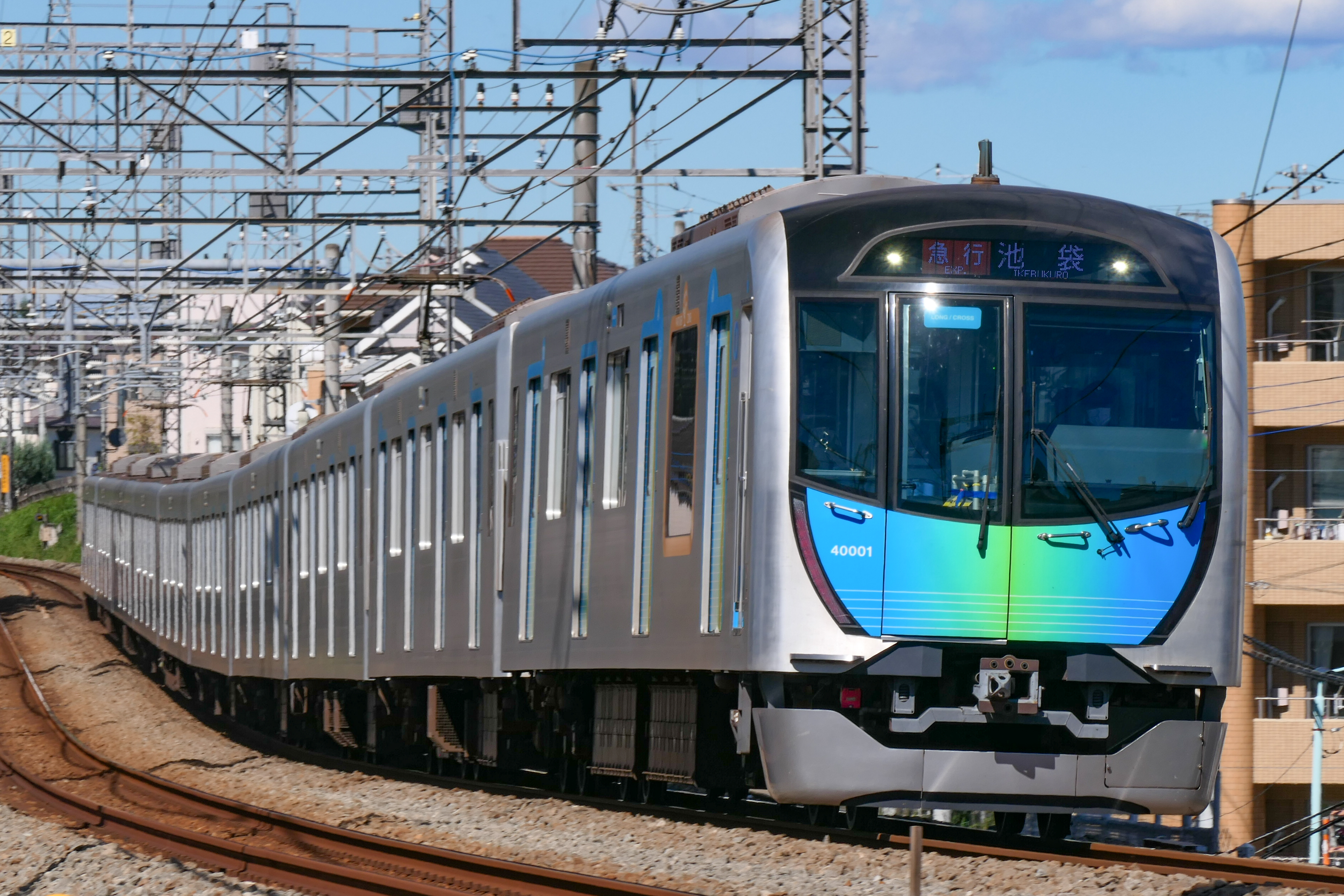
40000 series

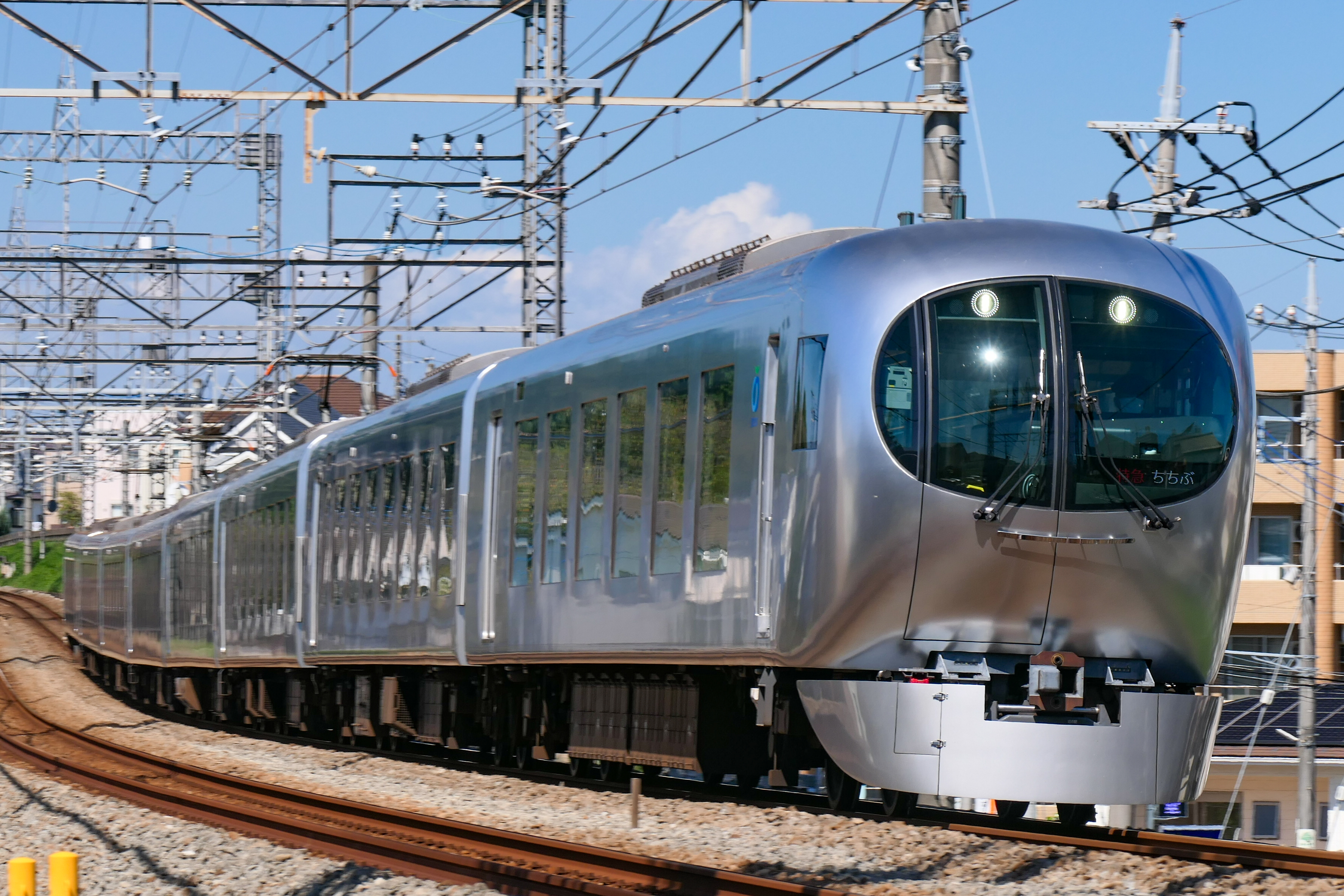
Seibu 001 series "Chichibu" Limited express train

=== Future rolling stock ===
- Seibu 7000 (Ex-Tokyu 9000 series) (from 2025)

Several Tokyu 9000 and Odakyu 8000 series trains (100 vehicles in total) are expected to be transferred from their original operators from 2024 in use primarily on Seibu's branch lines such as the Kokubunji and Chichibu lines, thus bringing down energy consumption as they replace some of Seibu's oldest trains.

=== Former rolling stock ===
- Seibu 3000 series (1982-2014)
- Seibu 701 series
- Seibu 401 series
- Seibu Original 101 series
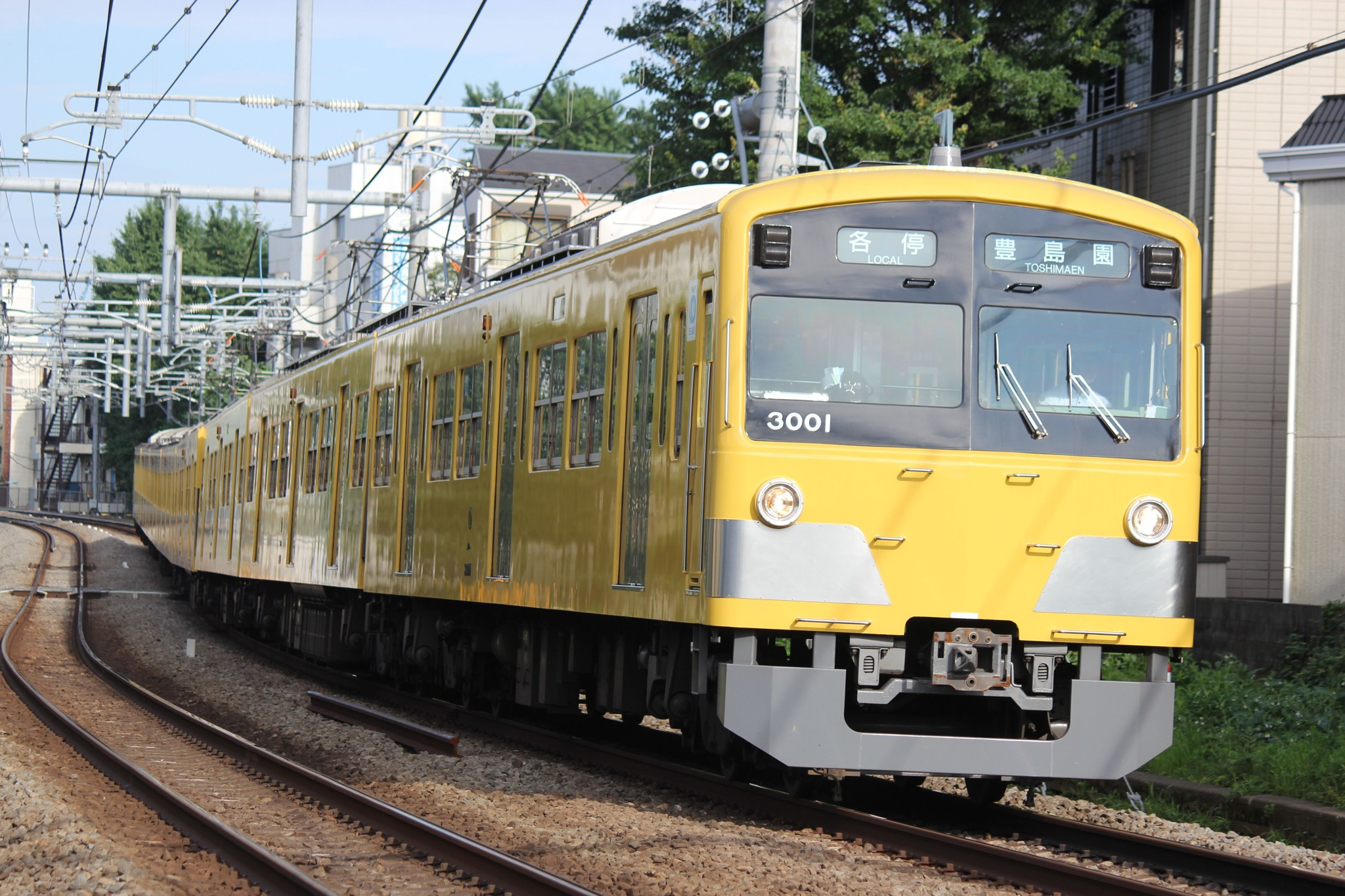
3000 series

=== People mover rolling stock ===
==== Current ====
- Three 4-car Seibu 8500 series (since opening of the line in 1985)

==== Future ====
- On January 22, 2025, Seibu Railway and Mitsubishi Heavy Industries both announced a new order for three 4-car trains to replace the Seibu 8500 series (expected FY2025 to FY2027).

== Railway fares ==
All fares are in Japanese yen (JPY). Fares are effective from March 18, 2023 and are still current in February, 2025.

=== Barrier-free fee ===
From March 18, 2023, a 10 yen "barrier-free" fee was added to regular fares of Seibu Railway and many other Tokyo railway operators. The fee will primarily be used to accelerate the installation of platform screen doors at stations. All fares below include the barrier-free fee.

=== Regular fares ===
Regular fares are based on the distance travelled. Fares paid by cash (paper ticket) are rounded up to the nearest 10 yen increment (ticket vending machines do not accept 1 yen or 5 yen coins). Children (under 12 years old) are charged half the adult fare (including the barrier-free fee), then rounded up to the nearest 10 yen increment if paying by cash.

Kilometres	IC Card	Cash
1~4	157	160
5~8	188	190
9~12	220	220
13~16	252	260
17~20	282	290
21~24	314	320
25~28	356	360
29~32	387	390
33~36	419	420
37~40	450	450
41~44	481	490
45~48	513	520
49~52	544	550
53~56	576	580
57~60	618	620
61~64	649	650
65~68	692	700
69~72	722	730
73~76	764	770
77~81	796	800

=== Reserved seat fares ===
In addition to a regular fare ticket, reserved seat trains also require purchase of a reserved seat ticket before boarding the train.

==== S-TRAIN ====
Operates on weekday mornings Tokorozawa—Toyosu, weekday evenings Toyosu-—Kotesashi & weekends Seibu-Chichibu/Hanno/Tokorozawa—Motomachi-Chūkagai.

Reserved seat ticket: 510 yen (260 yen for children under 12yo), regardless of the distance travelled.

==== Haijima Liner ====
Operates between Haijima and Seibu-Shinjuku.

Reserved seat ticket: 400 yen (200 yen for children under 12years old), regardless of the distance travelled.

=== Limited Express fares ===
In addition to a regular fare ticket, Limited Express trains also require purchase of a Limited Express ticket before boarding the train.

==== Ikebukuro Line Laview ====
Laview (ラビュー), also known as Laview Express, operates between Ikebukuro and Seibu-Chichibu using Seibu 001 Series trainsets.

Limited Express ticket: between 400 and 600 yen (between 200 and 300 yen for children under 12yo), depending on the distance travelled.

==== Shinjuku Line Red Arrow ====
Red Arrow (レッドアロー), also known as Red Arrow Express or New Red Arrow (NRA), operates between Seibu-Shinjuku and Hon-Kawagoe using Seibu 10000 Series trainsets.

Limited Express ticket: between 500 and 900 yen (between 250 and 450 yen for children under 12yo), depending on the distance travelled.

== Affiliated companies ==
- Prince Hotels
- Seibu Construction
- Seibu Bus
- Saitama Seibu Lions (professional baseball team)
- Seibu Dome
- Seibu Real Estate
- Seibu Trading
