= Hitotsubashi-Gakuen Station =

Railway station in Kodaira, Tokyo, Japan

ST02 Hitotsubashi-Gakuen Station 一橋学園駅
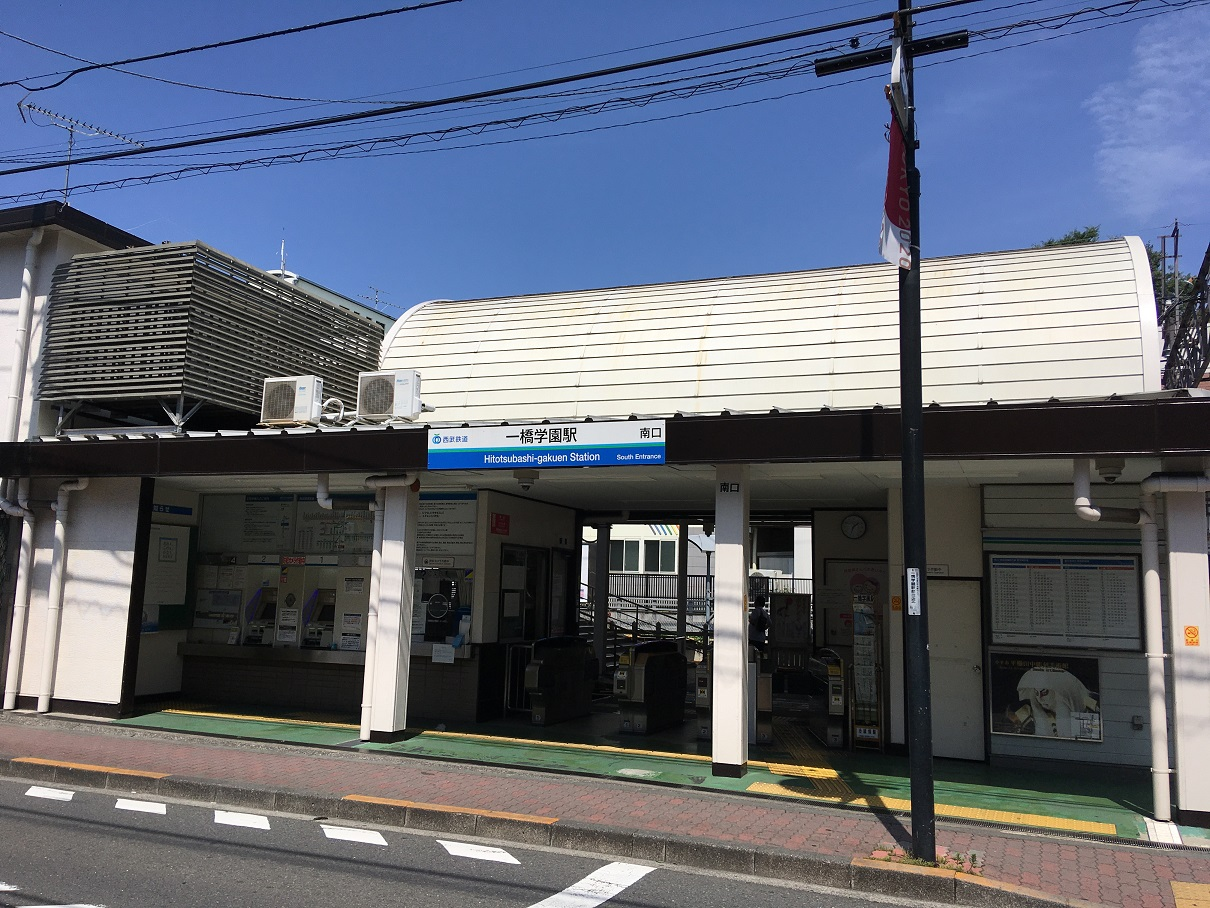
- Hitotsubashi-Gakuen Station, August 2020

General information
- Location: 2-1-1 Gakuen-nishi-cho, Kodaira, Tokyo 187-0045; Japan
- Coordinates: 35°43′19.78″N 139°28′48.32″E
- Operator: Seibu Railway
- Line: Seibu Tamako Line
- Distance: 2.4 km from Kokubunji
- Platforms: 1 island platform

Other information
- Station code: ST02
- Website: Official website

History
- Opened: April 6, 1928

Passengers
- FY 2019: 21,189 daily

Services
| Preceding station | Seibu Railway | Following station |
|---|---|---|
| Ōmekaidō ST03 towards Tamako | Tamako Line | Kokubunji ST01 Terminus |
Location
- Location within Tokyo Location within Japan

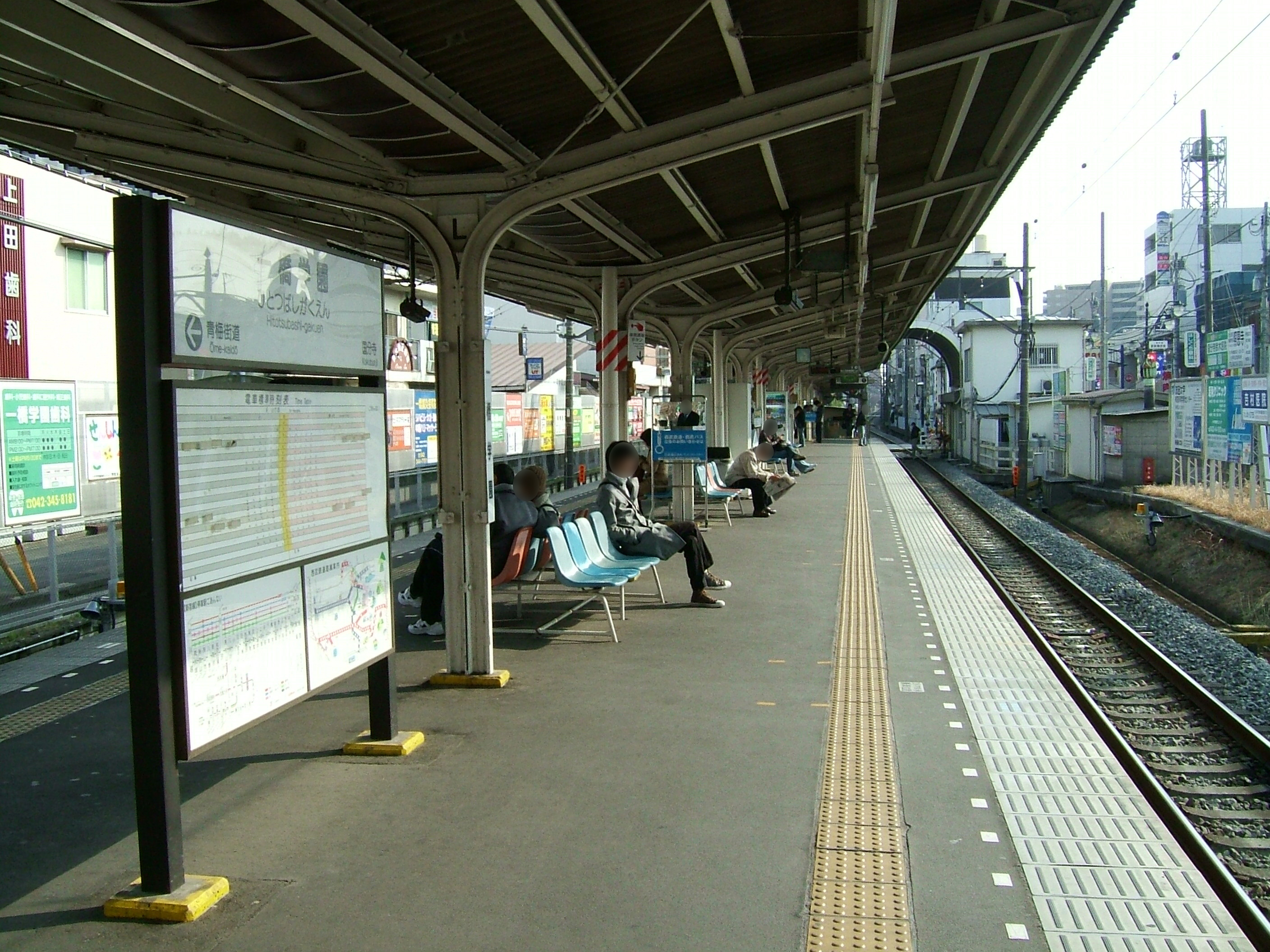
Platforms of Hitotsubashi-Gakuen Station

Hitotsubashi-Gakuen Station (一橋学園駅, Hitotsubashi-Gakuen eki) is a passenger railway station located in the city of Kodaira, Tokyo, Japan, operated by the private railway company Seibu Railway.

== Lines ==
Hitotsubashi-Gakuen Station is served by the 9.2 km Seibu Tamako Line from Kokubunji in Kokubunji, Tokyo to Tamako in Higashimurayama, Tokyo. It is located 2.4 kilometers from the terminus of the line at Kokubunji Station.

=== Platforms ===
| 1 | Seibu Tamako Line | for Hagiyama and Tamako |
| 2 | Seibu Tamako Line | for Kokubunji |

== Station layout ==
The station has a single island platform on a north-south axis, serving two ground-level tracks. The Seibu Tamako Line is single-track most of its length, and dual track at Histotsubashi-gauken Station is used to allow trains travelling in opposite directions to pass each other. Thus, a train arriving in the station will wait at the platform for a train to stop at the opposite platform before departure. The station has entrances-exits at both ends of the platform (North and South). Passengers are able to cross to the platform island by means of small level crossings after the automatic ticket wicket gates. Passengers then climb steps (south) or a ramp (north) to platform level.

== History ==
Hitotsubashi-Gauken Station opened on April 6, 1928, when the track between Kodaira and Kokubunji, via Hagiyama was opened, which is now part of the Seibu Tamako Line.

Station numbering was introduced on all Seibu Railway lines during fiscal 2012, with Hitotsubashi-Gauken Station becoming "ST02".

== Passenger statistics ==
In fiscal 2019, the station was the 50th busiest on the Seibu network with an average of 21,189 passengers daily.

The passenger figures for previous years are as shown below.

| Fiscal year | Daily average |
|---|---|
| 2005 | 21,964 |
| 2010 | 20,218 |
| 2015 | 21,202 |

== Surrounding area ==
- Hitotsubashi University
- Kodaira Hirakushi Denchu Art Museum
- College of Land, Infrastructure, Transport and Tourism

== See also ==
- List of railway stations in Japan
