= Yasaka =

Yasaka may refer to:

- Yasaka, Nagano, Japan (dissolved village)
- Yasaka, Shimane, Japan (dissolved village)
- Yasaka, Kyoto, Japan (dissolved town)
- Yasaka Shrine in Kyoto, Japan
- Yasaka Station (Tokyo), a station on the Seibu Tamako Line in Higashimurayama, Tokyo, Japan
- Yasaka Station (Gifu), a station on the Etsumi-Nan Line in Gujō, Gifu, Japan
- Yasaka (corporation), a sporting goods equipment maker
- Yaska, a 6th-century B.C. Sanskrit grammarian
