= Musashi-Yamato Station =

Railway station in Higashimurayama, Tokyo, Japan

ST06 Musashi-Yamato Station 武蔵大和駅
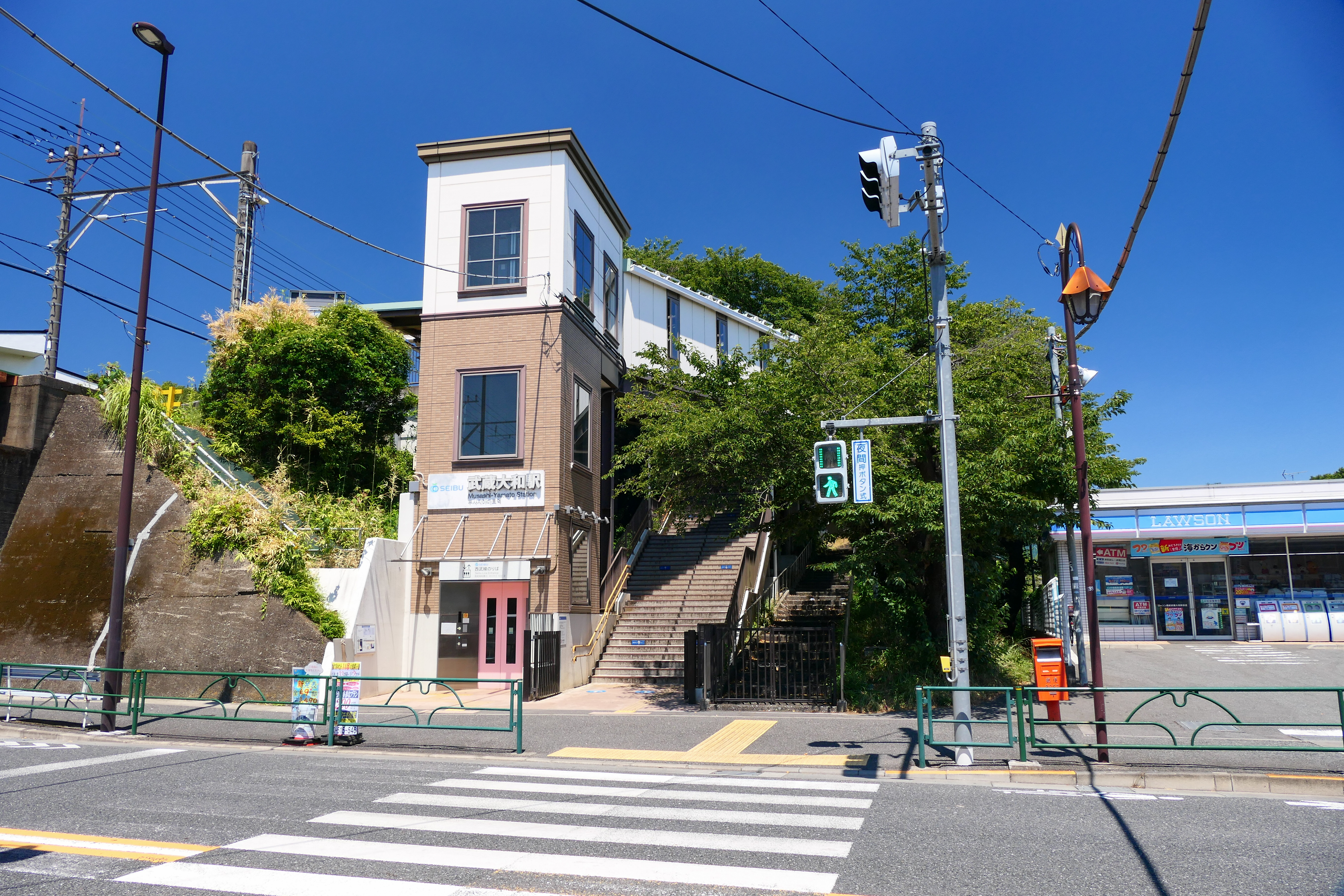
- Entrance of Musashi-Yamato Station, July 2023

General information
- Location: 3-9-19 Megurita-cho, Higashimurayama-shi, Tokyo; Japan
- Coordinates: 35.7562°N 139.4439°E
- Operator: Seibu Railway
- Line: Seibu Tamako Line
- Distance: 27.2 km from Seibu-Shinjuku
- Platforms: 1 side platform

Other information
- Station code: ST06
- Website: Official website

History
- Opened: January 23, 1930

Passengers
- FY2019: 7,389

Services
Preceding station	Seibu Railway	Following station
Tamako ST07 Terminus	Tamako Line	Yasaka ST05 towards Kokubunji
Location
- Location within Tokyo Location within Japan

Musashi-Yamato Station (武蔵大和駅, Musashi-Yamato-eki) is a passenger railway station located in the city of Higashimurayama, Tokyo, Japan, operated by the private railway operator Seibu Railway.

== Lines ==
Musashi-Yamato Station is a station on the Seibu Tamako Line, and is located 8.1 kilometers from the terminus of that line at Kokubunji. A limited number of through services to the Seibu Shinjuku line during the morning rush hour. Most services operate between Tamako and Kokubunji stations while some services terminate at Hagiyama.

== Station layout ==
The station has a single side platform serving a single bi-directional track, which is elevated above a road.

=== Platforms ===
1	Seibu Tamako Line	for Hagiyama and Kokubunji
2	Seibu Tamako Line	for Tamako

== History ==
The station opened on January 23, 1930. Station numbering was introduced on all Seibu Railway lines during fiscal 2012, with Musashi-Yamato Station becoming "ST06".

== Passenger statistics ==
In fiscal 2019, the station was the 74th busiest on the Seibu network with an average of 7,389 passengers daily.

The passenger figures for previous years are as shown below.

Fiscal year	Daily average
2005	7,608
2010	7,176
2015	7,441

== Surrounding area ==
- Sayama Prefectural Natural Park (Tokyo)

== See also ==
- List of railway stations in Japan
