= Ōmekaidō Station =

Railway station in Kodaira, Tokyo, Japan

ST03 Ōmekaidō Station 青梅街道駅
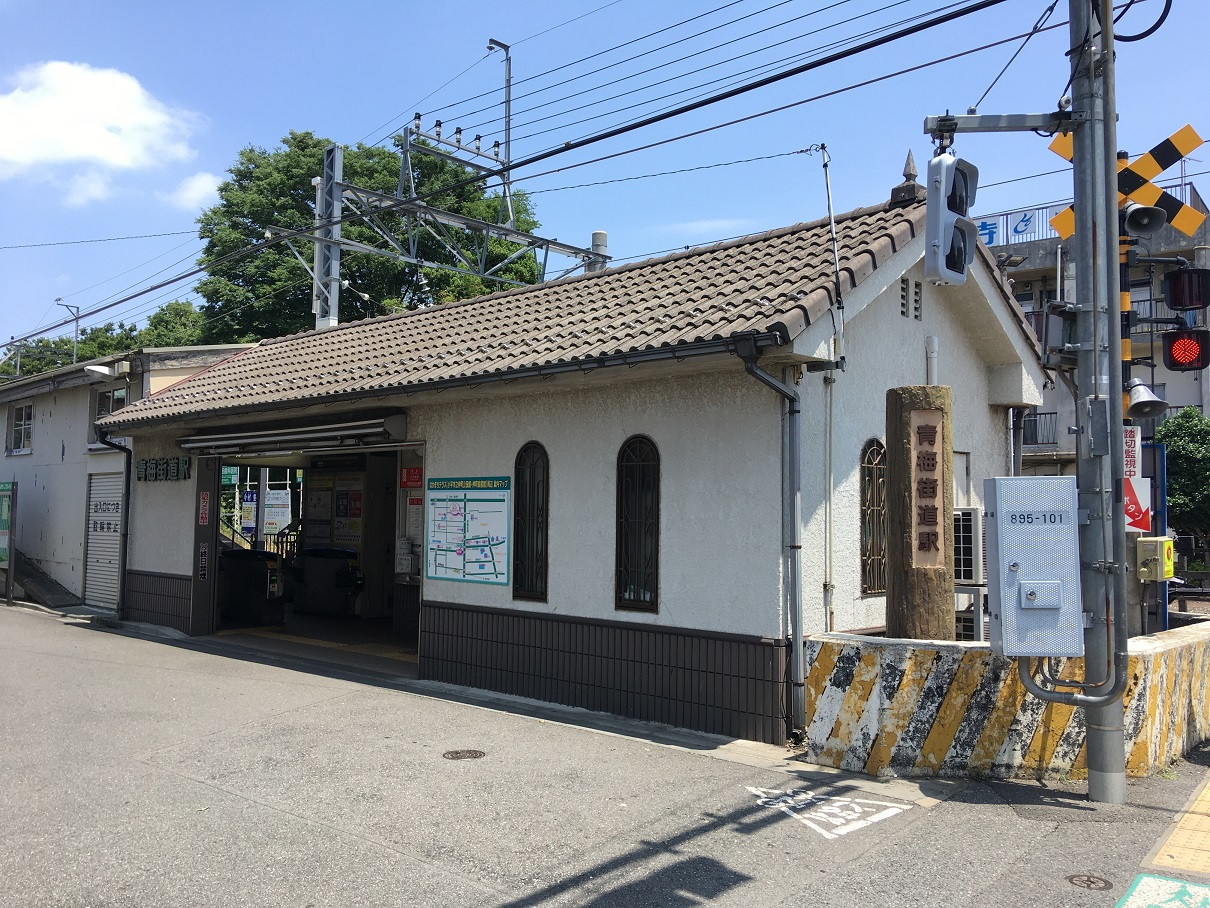
- South entrance to Ōmekaidō Station, June 2020

General information
- Location: 1-34-1 Misono-cho, Kodaira-shi, Tokyo 187-0032; Japan
- Coordinates: 35.73063°N 139.47654°E
- Operator: Seibu Railway
- Line: Seibu Tamako Line
- Distance: 3.4 km from Kokubunji
- Platforms: 1 side platform

Other information
- Station code: ST03
- Website: Official website

History
- Opened: April 6, 1928

Passengers
- FY 2019: 8,367 daily

Services
Preceding station	Seibu Railway	Following station
Hagiyama ST04 towards Tamako	Tamako Line	Hitotsubashi-Gakuen ST02 towards Kokubunji
Location
- Location within Tokyo Location within Japan

Ōmekaidō Station (青梅街道駅, Ōmekaidō eki) is a passenger railway station located in the city of Kodaira, Tokyo, Japan. It is named after the Ōme Kaidō highway which passes nearby the train station.

== Lines ==
Ōmekaidō Station is served by the 9.2 km Seibu Tamako Line from Kokubunji in Kokubunji, Tokyo to Tamako in Higashimurayama, Tokyo. It is located 3.4 kilometers from the terminus of the line at Kokubunji Station.

== Station layout ==
The station has a single side platform on a north-south axis, serving one ground-level bi-directional track. The station has one entrance/exit at the south of the station. In addition to automatic ticket vending machines, a ticket window is located adjacent to the automatic wicket gates, which is staffed at all times during station opening hours. The first train to Kokubunji departs at 05:14 and the last train departs at 00:27 bound for Hagiyama.

=== Platforms ===
1	Seibu Tamako Line	for Hagiyama and Tamako
2	Seibu Tamako Line	for Kokubunji

== History ==
Ōmekaidō Station opened on April 6, 1928, when the track between Kodaira and Kokubunji, via Hagiyama was opened, which is now part of the Seibu Tamako Line.

Station numbering was introduced on all Seibu Railway lines during fiscal 2012, with Ōmekaidō Station becoming "ST03".

== Passenger statistics ==
In fiscal 2019, the station was the 71st busiest on the Seibu network with an average of 8,367 passengers daily.

The passenger figures for previous years are as shown below.

Fiscal year	Daily average
2005	6,629
2010	6,866
2015	7,911

== Surrounding area ==
Ōmekaidō Station is a short walk from Shin-Kodaira on the JR Musashino Line. This connection is sometimes recommended by JR reservations service and online route planners.

== See also ==
- List of railway stations in Japan
