= Yasaka Station (Tokyo) =

Railway station in Higashimurayama, Tokyo, Japan

ST05 Yasaka Station 八坂駅
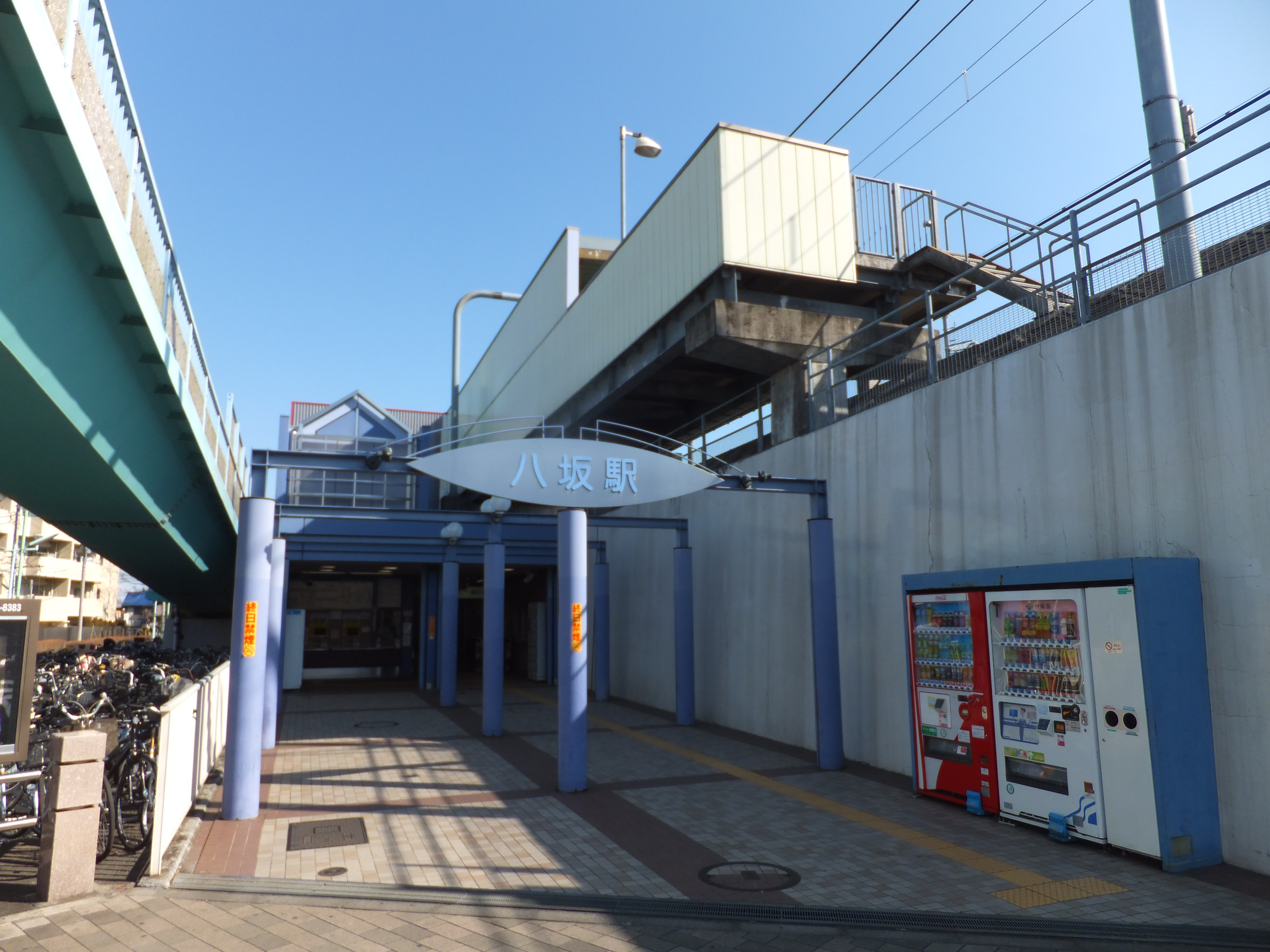
- Entrance to Yasaka Station, March 2016

General information
- Location: 3-18-1 Sakae-cho, Higashimurayama-shi, Tokyo 189-0013; Japan
- Coordinates: 35.7451°N 139.4675°E
- Operator: Seibu Railway
- Line: Seibu Tamako Line
- Distance: 24.7 km from Seibu-Shinjuku
- Platforms: 1 side platform

Other information
- Station code: ST05
- Website: Official website

History
- Opened: 1 October 1942

Passengers
- FY2019: 6,171

Services
Preceding station	Seibu Railway	Following station
Musashi-Yamato ST06 towards Tamako	Tamako Line	Hagiyama ST04 towards Kokubunji
Location
- Location within Tokyo Location within Japan

Yasaka Station (八坂駅, Yasaka-eki) is a passenger railway station located in the city of Higashimurayama, Tokyo, Japan, operated by the private railway operator Seibu Railway.

== Lines ==
Yasaka Station is a station on the Seibu Tamako Line, and is located 5.6 kilometers from the terminus of that line at Kokubunji. A limited number of through services to the Seibu Shinjuku line during the morning rush hour. Most services operate between Tamako and Kokubunji stations while some services terminate at Hagiyama.

== Station layout ==
The station has a single side platform serving a single bi-directional track, which is elevated above a major road. The station has one entrance/exit to the north of the station.

=== Platforms ===
1	Seibu Tamako Line	for Hagiyama and Kokubunji
2	Seibu Tamako Line	for Tamako

== History ==
The station opened on 1 October 1942.

Station numbering was introduced on all Seibu Railway lines during fiscal 2012, with Yasaka Station becoming "ST05".

== Passenger statistics ==
In fiscal 2019, the station was the 78th busiest on the Seibu network with an average of 6,171 passengers daily.

The passenger figures for previous years are as shown below.

Fiscal year	Daily average
2005	5,321
2010	5,288
2015	5,852

== Surrounding area ==
Yasaka station is located near to the headquarters and factories of the Bridgestone tire company. Nearby is a large supermarket, part of the Daiei chain. Also in the neighborhood is Higashimurayama municipal park and Yasaka Jinja.

== See also ==
- List of railway stations in Japan
