= Seibuen-yūenchi Station =

Railway station in Tokorozawa, Saitama Prefecture, Japan

SY02 Seibuen-yūenchi Station 西武園ゆうえんち駅
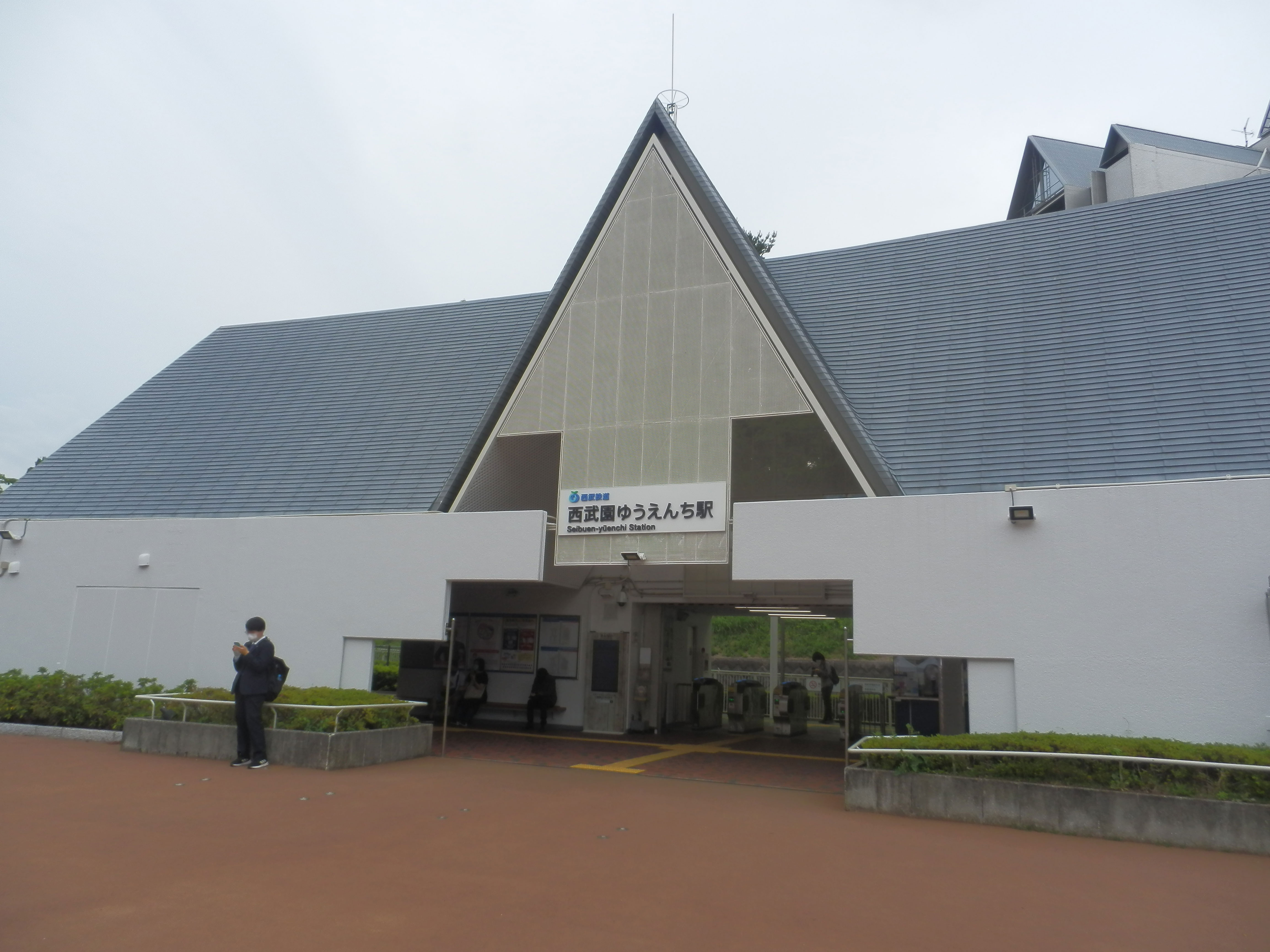
- Seibuen-yūenchi Station (June 2021)

General information
- Location: 2939 Yamaguchi, Tokorozawa-shi, Saitama-ken 359-1145; Japan
- Coordinates: 35.7689°N 139.4400°E
- Operator: Seibu Railway
- Line: Seibu Yamaguchi Line
- Distance: 0.3 km from Tamako
- Platforms: 1 side platform
- Connections

Other information
- Station code: SY02
- Website: Official website

History
- Opened: April 25, 1985
- Former names: Yūenchi-nishi Station (to 2021)

Passengers
- FY2019: 682 daily

Services
Preceding station	Seibu Railway	Following station
Seibukyūjō-mae SY03 Terminus	Yamaguchi Line	Tamako SY01 Terminus
Location
- Location within Saitama Prefecture Location within Japan

Seibuen-yūenchi Station (西武園ゆうえんち駅, Seibuen-yūenchi-eki) is a passenger railway station located in the city of Tokorozawa, Saitama, Japan, operated by the private railway operator Seibu Railway. It is located at the entrance to the Seibu-en Amusement Park.

== Lines ==
Seibuen-yūenchi Station is a station on the Seibu Railway's Yamaguchi Line (Leo Liner), and is located 0.3 kilometers from Tamako.

== Station layout ==
The station has a single side platform.

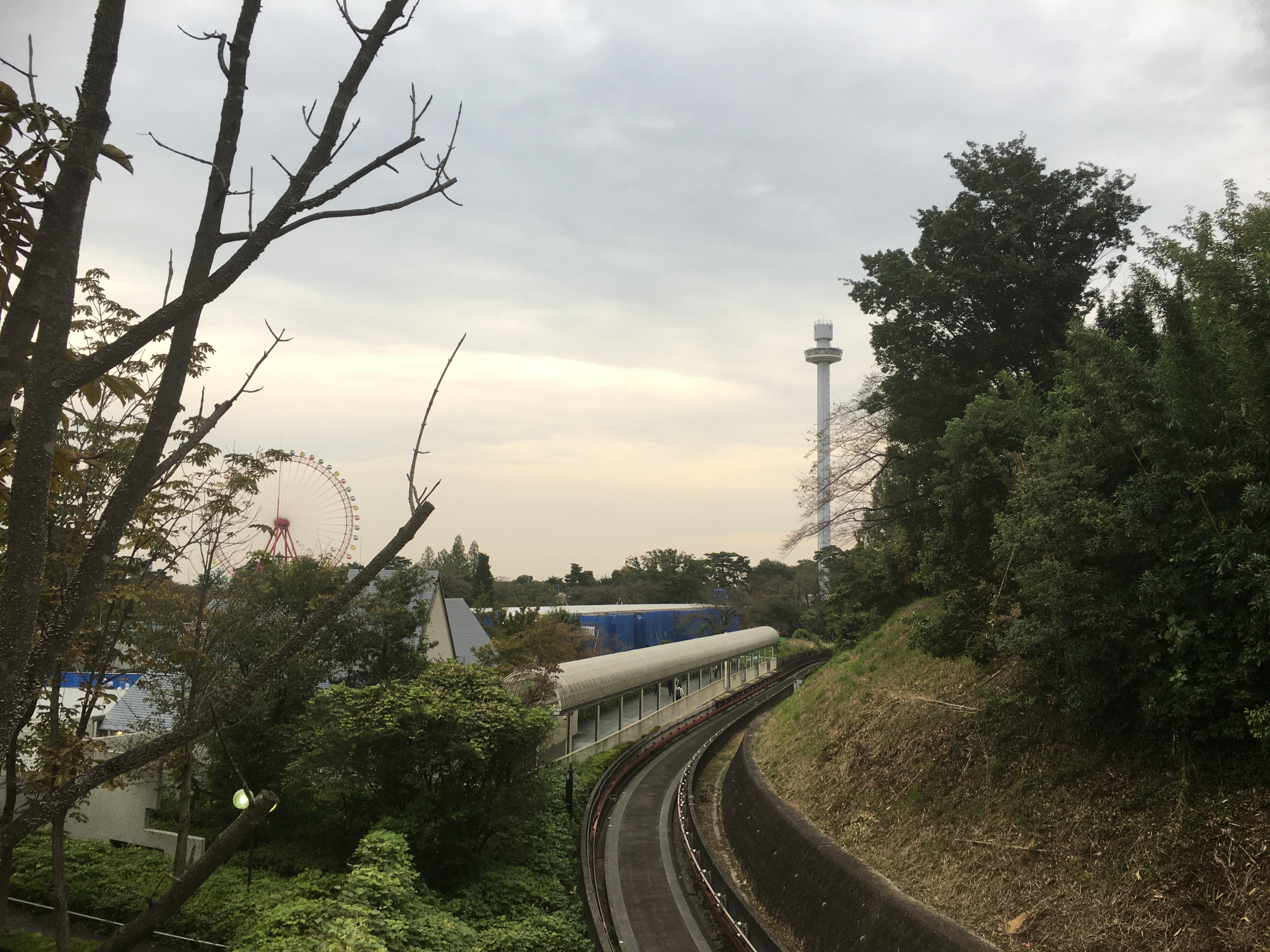
Station platform, 2020

== History ==
The station was opened on 25 April 1985 as Yūenchi-nishi Station (遊園地西駅) with the opening of the Seibu Yamaguchi Line. On 13 March 2021, it was renamed to its current name.

== Passenger statistics ==
In fiscal 2019, the station was the 86th busiest on the Seibu network (and the least busiest on the Yamaguchi Line) with an average of 682 passengers daily. The passenger figures for previous years are as shown below.

Fiscal year	Daily average
2009	763
2010	781
2011	950
2012	898
2013	781

== Surrounding area ==
- Seibuen Yūenchi amusement park

== See also ==
- List of railway stations in Japan
