= Seibu 9000 series =

Electric multiple unit train of Seibu Railway

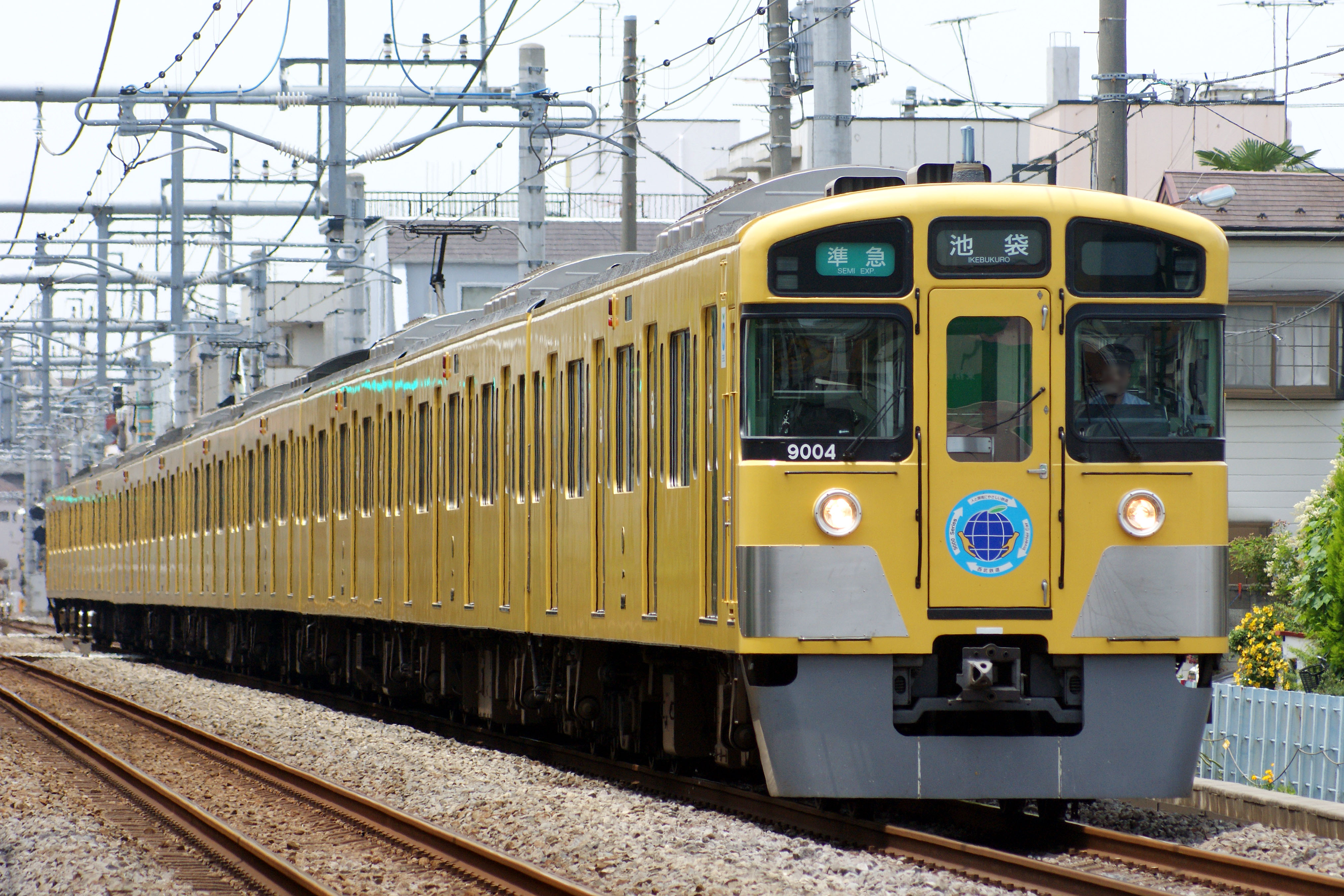
- Refurbished set 9104 in June 2008
- In service: 1993–present
- Manufacturer: Seibu Tokorozawa Railway Works
- Built at: Tokorozawa
- Replaced: 101 series
- Constructed: 1993–1999
- Entered service: March 1994; 32 years ago
- Refurbished: 2004–2008
- Number built: 80 vehicles (8 sets)
- Number in service: 20 vehicles (5 sets)
- Number scrapped: At least 30 vehicles (as of 13 January 2021)
- Formation: 4 (formerly 10) cars per trainset
- Fleet numbers: 9101–9108
- Operator: Seibu Railway
- Depot: Musashigaoka
- Lines served: Seibu Ikebukuro Line; Seibu Tamako Line

Specifications
- Car body construction: Steel
- Car length: 20 m (65 ft 7 in)
- Doors: 4 pairs per side
- Maximum speed: 105 km/h (65 mph)
- Traction system: Resistor control (before refurbishment); Variable frequency (IGBT) (after refurbishment)
- Electric systems: 1,500 V DC (overhead lines)
- Current collection: Pantograph
- Track gauge: 1,067 mm (3 ft 6 in)

The Seibu 9000 series (西武9000系) is an electric multiple unit (EMU) train type operated by the private railway operator Seibu Railway on commuter services in the Tokyo area of Japan since March 1994.

== Design ==
The 9000 series trains were built between 1993 and 1999 at Seibu's own Tokorozawa Factory by combining electrical equipment from former 101 series EMUs with new steel bodies based on the New 2000 series design. These were the last trains to be built at the Tokorozawa Factory before it closed in 2000.

== Fleet ==
As of 1 April 2015, the fleet consists of eight 10-car sets, numbered 9101 to 9108, based at Musashigaoka depot for use on Seibu Ikebukuro Line workings.

== Formations ==
=== 10-car sets ===
10-car sets were formed as shown below with six motored ("M") cars and four non-powered trailer ("T") cars.

Car No.	1	2	3	4	5	6	7	8	9	10
Designation	Tc1	M1	M2	T1	M3	M4	T2	M5	M6	Tc2
Numbering	9100	9200	9300	9400	9500	9600	9700	9800	9900	9000

- Cars 2, 5, and 8 were each equipped with one single-arm pantograph.

=== 4-car sets ===
The train sets were shortened following the transfer to the Tamako Line.

Car No.	1	2	9	10
Designation	Tc1	M1	M2	Tc2
Numbering	9100	9200	9900	9000

- Car 2 is equipped with one single-arm pantograph.

=== Fleet list ===
As of 30 September 2026, the fleet was as follows:

Set number	Date delivered	Date shortened	Date withdrawn
9101	16 December 1993	-	March 2018
9102	October 1994	August 2020	-
9103	June 1995	December 2020	-
9104	March 1996	February 2021	-
9105	December 1996	June 2020	-
9106	March 1997	-	October 2017
9107	March 1998	-	March 2018
9108	August 1998	April 2020	-

== Interior ==
Seating consists of longitudinal bench seating throughout. Wheelchair spaces are provided in cars 2 and 9. Priority seats are provided at the end of each car.

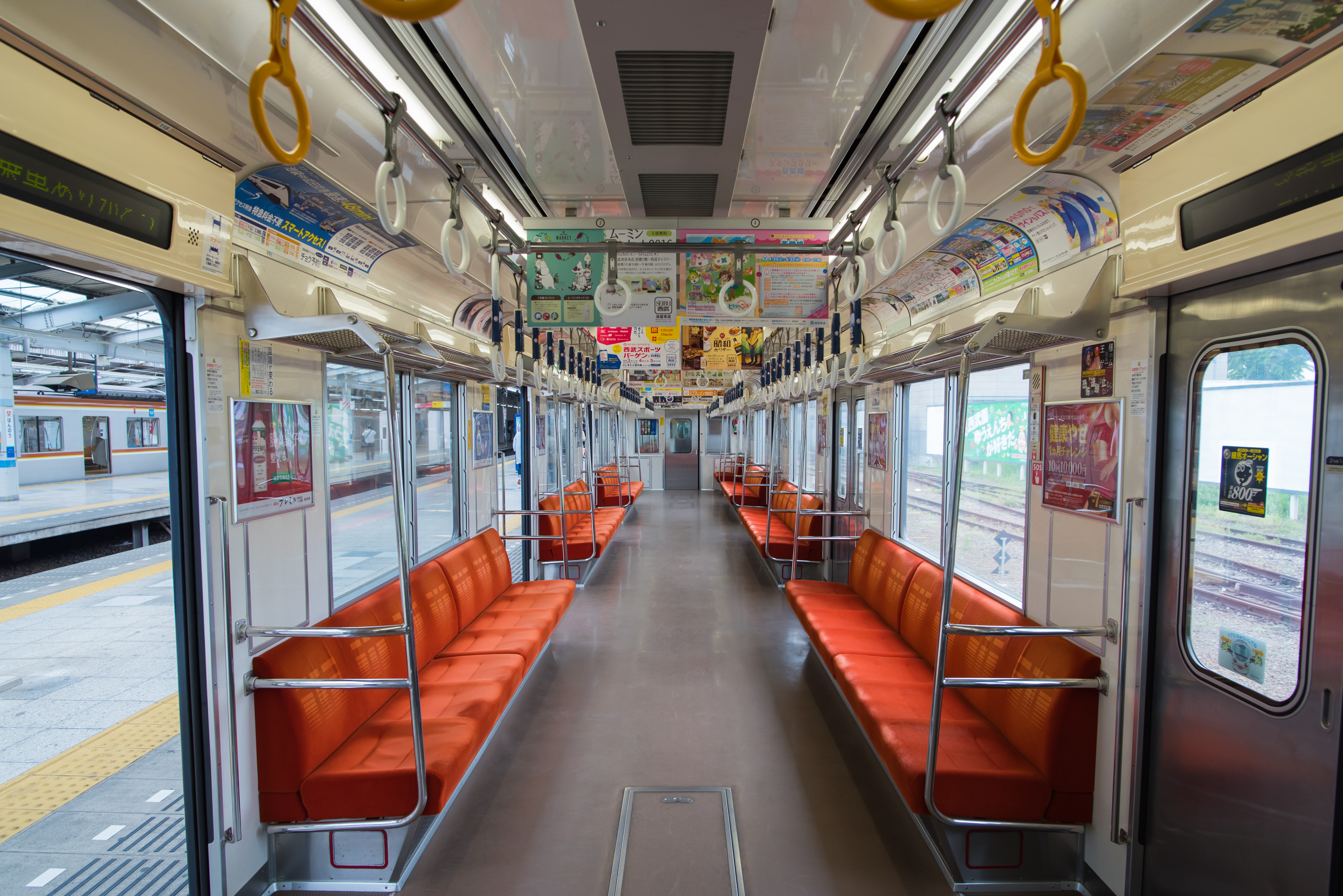
The interior of a 9000 series train in May 2016

== History ==
The first train entered service in 1994, with eight 10-car sets built by 1999. The fleet was refurbished between 2004 and 2008, with new underframe equipment and VVVF inverter control. Refurbished sets are identified by stickers on the cab end doors.

=== Tamako Line transfer ===
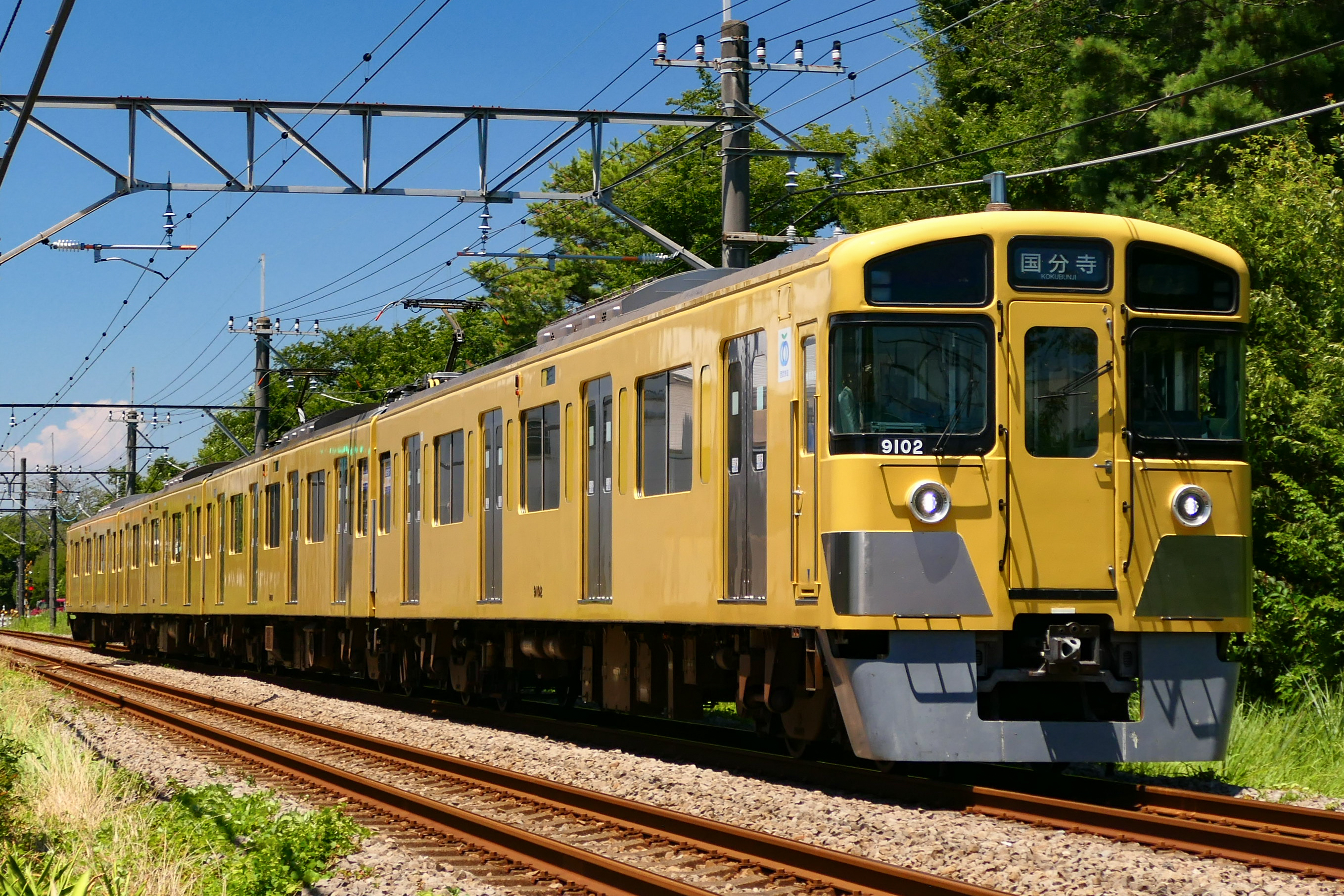
Set 9102 in July 2023

Beginning in 2020, the 9000 series fleet was shortened to four-car formations and modified to accommodate driver-only operation for use on the Tamako Line. The first of these sets was set 9108, which entered service on the Tamako Line on 1 October 2020. As of 15 June 2021, the entire fleet has been modified for Tamako Line operation, excluding sets 9101, 9106, and 9107, which were scrapped beforehand.

== Livery variations ==
=== "Red Lucky Train" ===
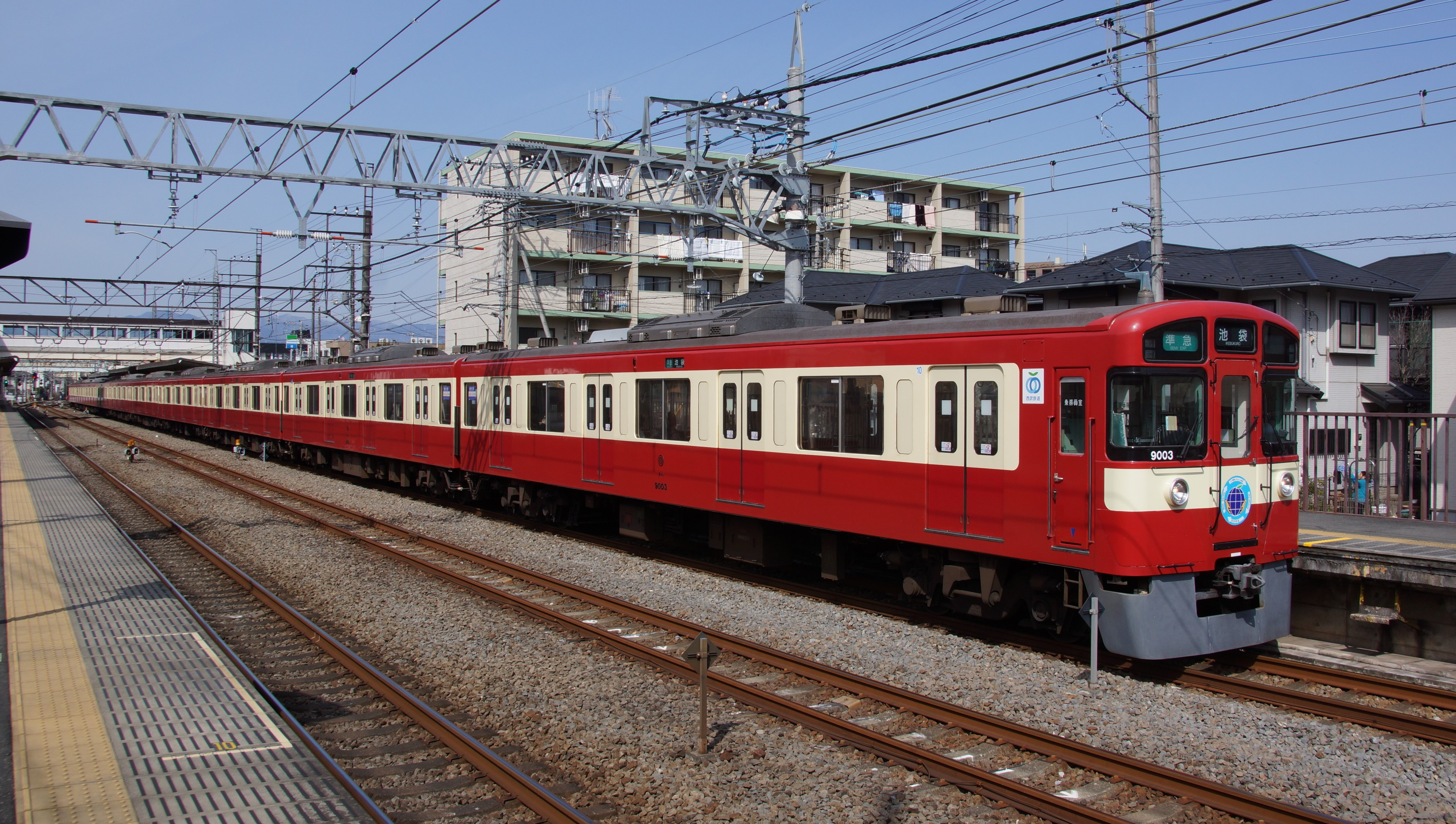
Set 9103 in "Red Lucky Train" livery in March 2017

From July 2014, set 9103 was repainted in a "Red Lucky Train" livery in collaboration with the private railway operator Keikyu. In return, Keikyu painted one of its own N1000 series sets into an all-over yellow livery similar to the Seibu livery in May 2014. Set 9103 was repainted in an all-over red livery after it was modified for Tamako Line operation.

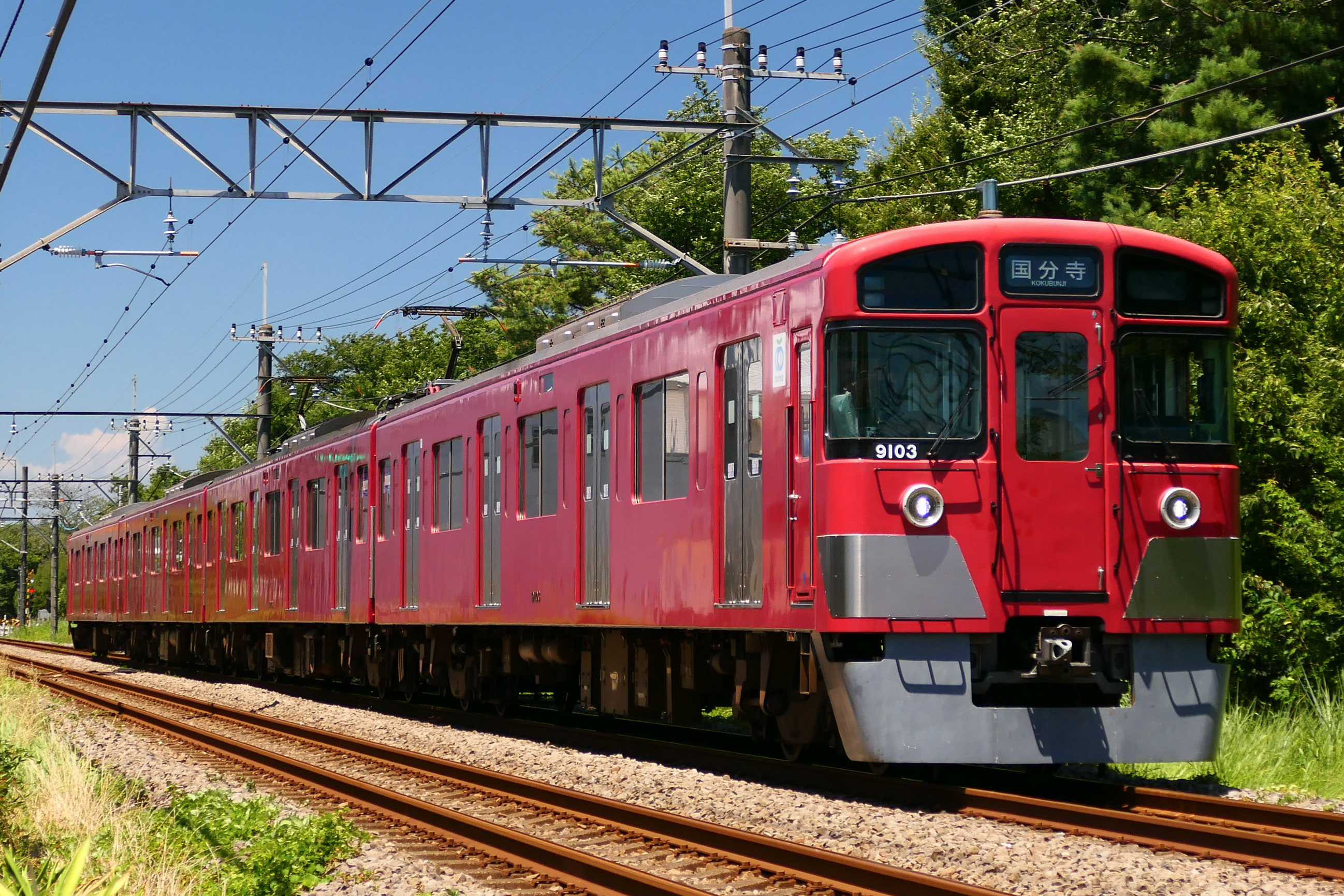
Set 9103 in plain red livery in July 2023

=== "L-train" ===
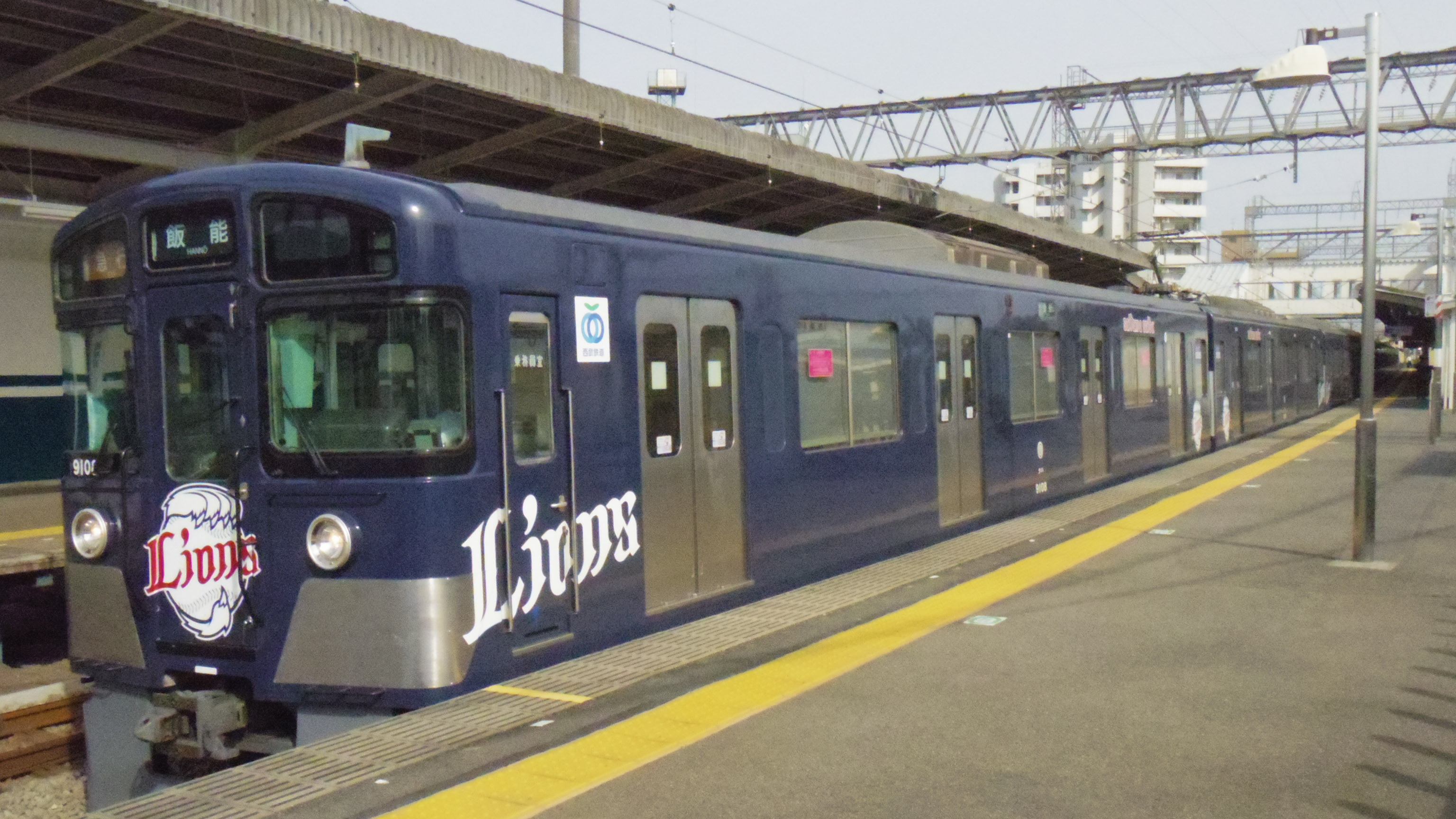
Set 9108 in "L-train" livery in May 2016

From 17 January 2016, set 9108 operated in a special "L-train" livery consisting of the Saitama Seibu Lions baseball team colour of dark blue with Seibu Lions logos. The set's Seibu Lions logos were removed following its modification for use on the Tamako Line.

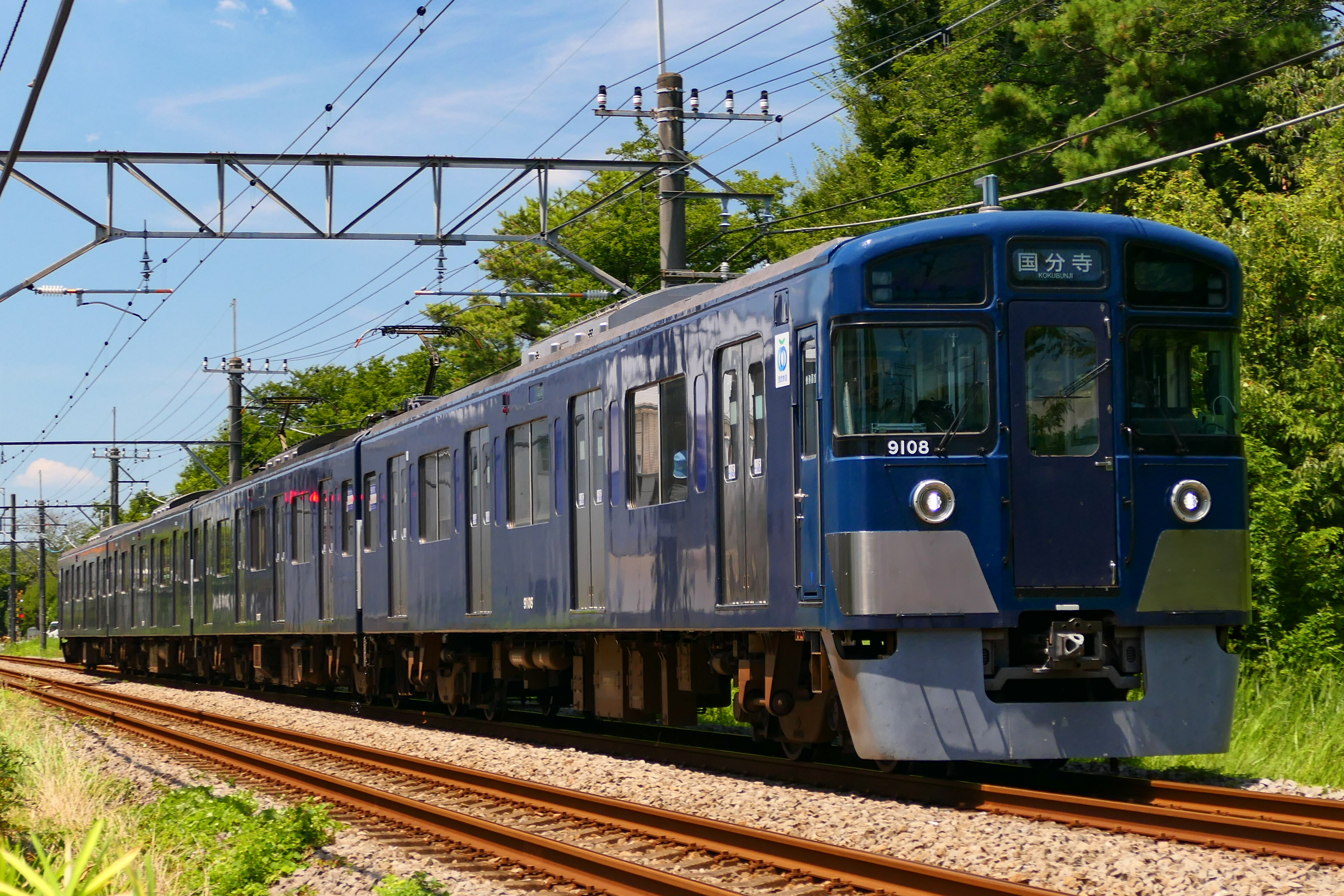
Set 9108 in all-over blue livery in July 2023

=== "Seibu KPP Train" ===
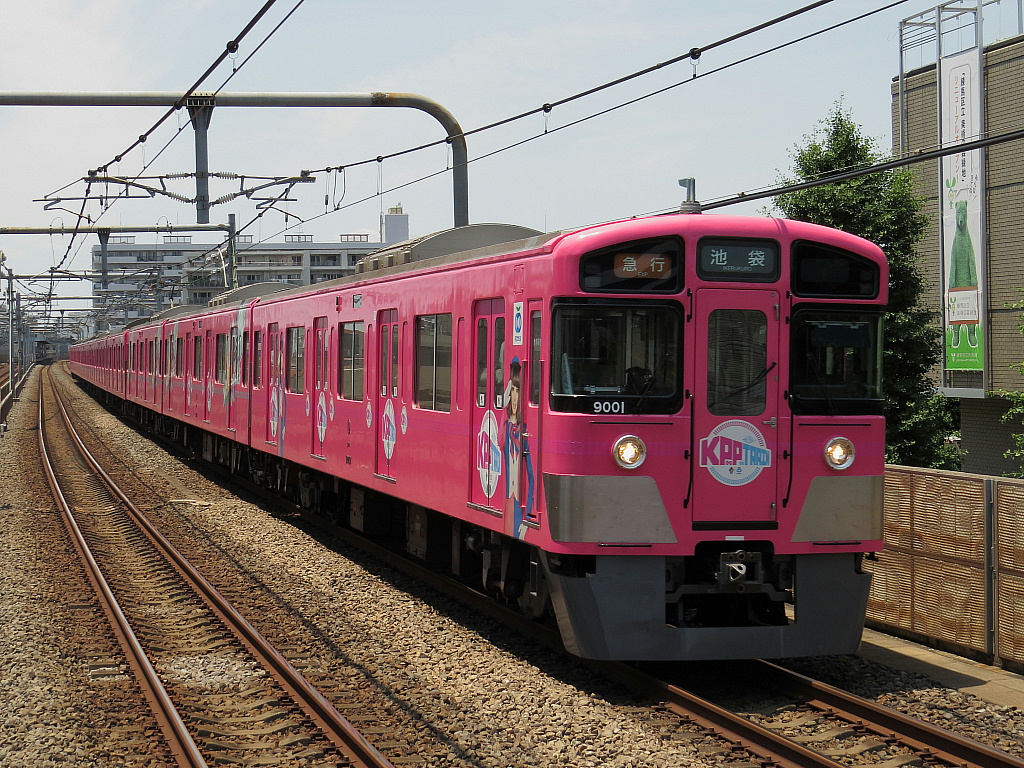
Set 9101 in "Seibu KPP Train" livery in June 2016

From 4 June 2016, set 9101 operated in a special "Seibu KPP Train" pink livery to mark the 100th anniversary of Seibu Railway in 2015 and the fifth anniversary of singer Kyary Pamyu Pamyu. The train operated in this livery until 29 September 2016, after which date the Kyary Pamyu Pamyu vinyls were removed, with the trainset operating in all-over pink livery. Set 9101 was withdrawn in March 2018.

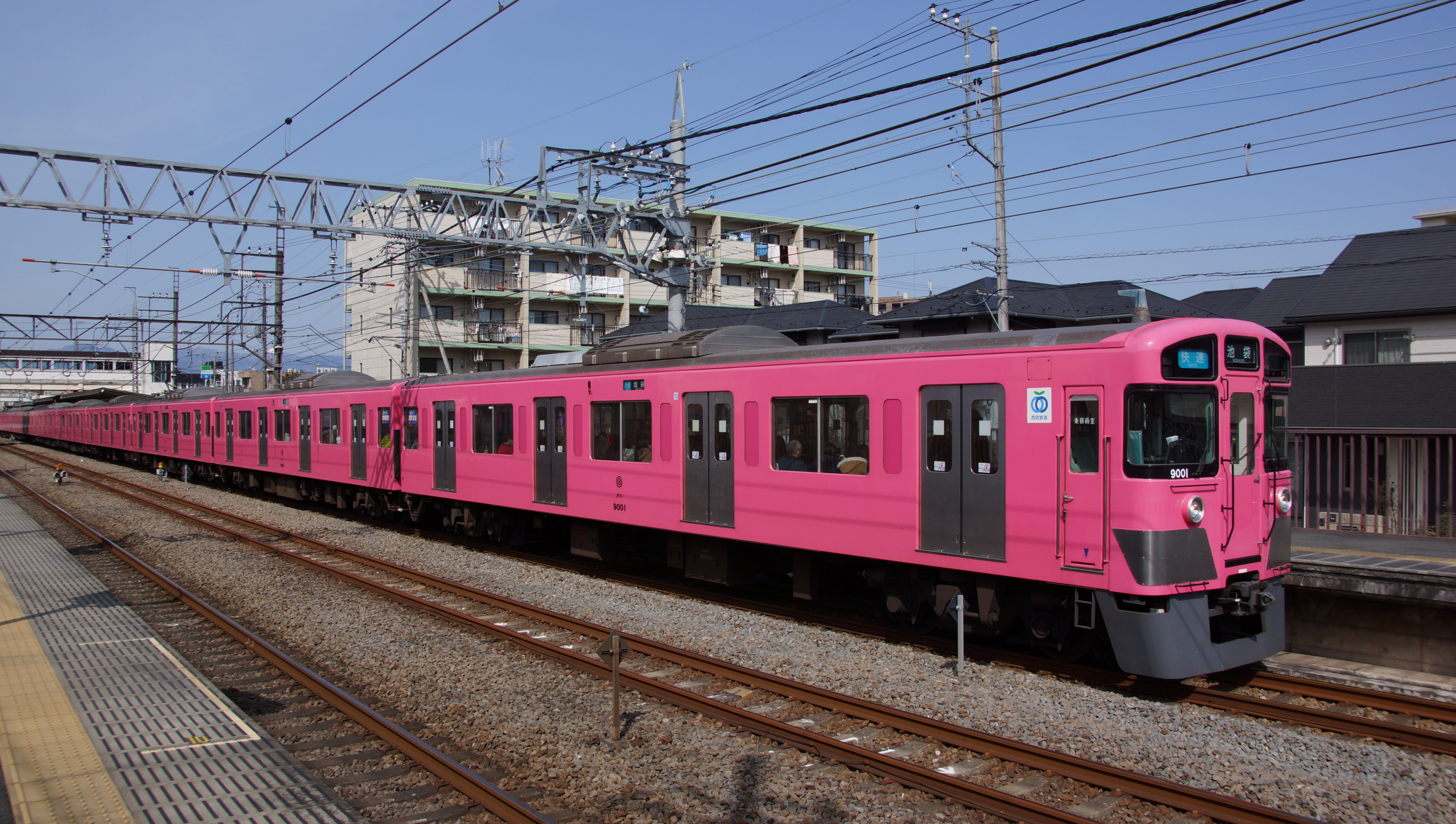
Set 9101 in plain pink livery in March 2017
