= Seibu Tamako Line =

Railway line of Seibu Railway in Tokyo, Japan

Tamako Line
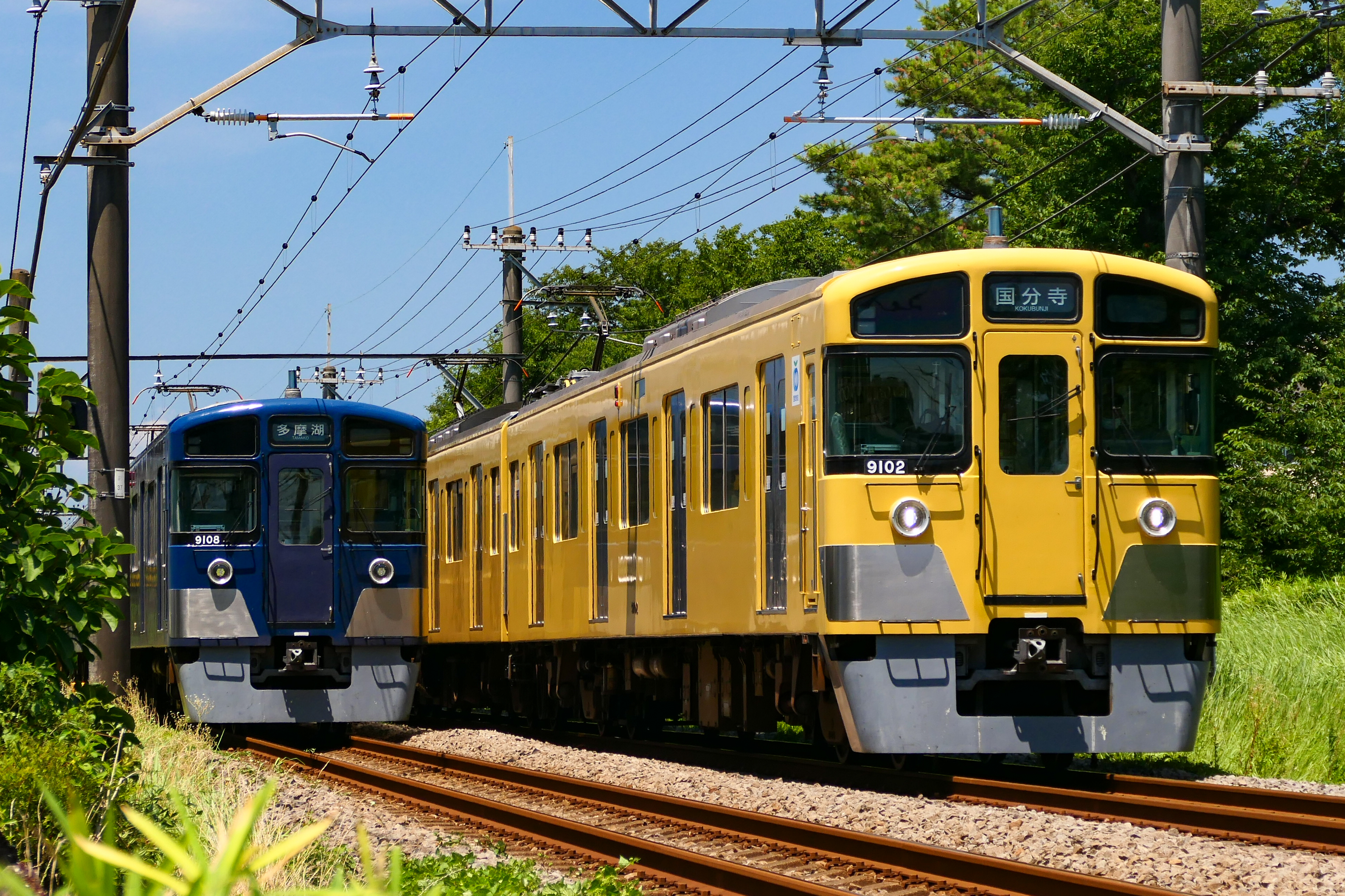
- 9000 series trains on the Tamako Line in July 2023

Overview
- Native name: 多摩湖線
- Owner: Seibu Railway
- Locale: Kantō region
- Termini: Kokubunji; Tamako
- Stations: 7

Service
- Type: Commuter rail
- System: Seibu Shinjuku
- Rolling stock: 101 series; 3000 series; 9000 series

History
- Opened: April 6, 1928; 98 years ago

Technical
- Line length: 9.2 km (5.7 mi)
- Number of tracks: 1
- Track gauge: 1,067 mm (3 ft 6 in)
- Electrification: 1,500 V DC, overhead catenary
- Operating speed: 95 km/h (60 mph)

The Tamako Line (多摩湖線, Tamako-sen) is a 9.2-kilometre (5.7 mi) single-track railway line in Tokyo, Japan, operated by the private railway operator Seibu Railway.

The line is part of the Seibu Shinjuku group of railway lines that connects suburban areas of western Tokyo to Seibu and JR East main lines that extend to central Tokyo. The line is named after the Tama Lake (多摩湖, Tamako), a major reservoir supplying water to Tokyo, located close to the terminus of the line at Tamako. Since July 2008, recorded announcements on trains have been provided in English in addition to Japanese and, as part of Seibu Railway's ongoing refurbishment programme, signage and maps at stations are also bilingual.

== Stations ==
No.	Name	Japanese	Distance (in km)	Connections	Location
	Kokubunji	国分寺	0.0	Kokubunji Line; Chūō Line	Kokubunji, Tokyo
	Hitotsubashi-Gakuen	一橋学園	2.4		Kodaira, Tokyo
	Ōmekaidō	青梅街道	3.4		Kodaira, Tokyo
	Hagiyama	萩山	4.6	Haijima Line	Higashimurayama, Tokyo
	Yasaka	八坂	5.6		Higashimurayama, Tokyo
	Musashi-Yamato	武蔵大和	8.1		Higashimurayama, Tokyo
	Tamako	多摩湖	9.2	Yamaguchi Line	Higashimurayama, Tokyo

== Operation ==
All services on this line operate as all-stations "Local" (普通列車, futsū-ressha) services, mainly for the full length of the line between Tamako and Kokubunji stations, with other services terminating at starting from the middle station, Hagiyama. The line is single track except at Hitotsubashi-Gakuen station and Hagiyama station, where services in operation routinely pass each other.

== Connections ==
This line connects the suburban Seibu lines with the JR Chūō line at Kokubunji. At Hagiyama, there is transfer to the Seibu Haijima Line. The Seibu Yamaguchi Line, also known as the Leo Liner, connects Tamako Station with Seibuen Amusement park and the Seibu Dome, home of the Saitama Seibu Lions baseball team. Ōmekaidō Station is listed as a connection to services on the JR Musashino Line at Shin-Kodaira Station, a short walk away.

The Tamako Line also provides access to the National Center of Neurology and Psychiatry and the International Campus of Hitotsubashi Gakuen University from Hagiyama and Hitotsubashi-Gakuen stations respectively.

== History ==
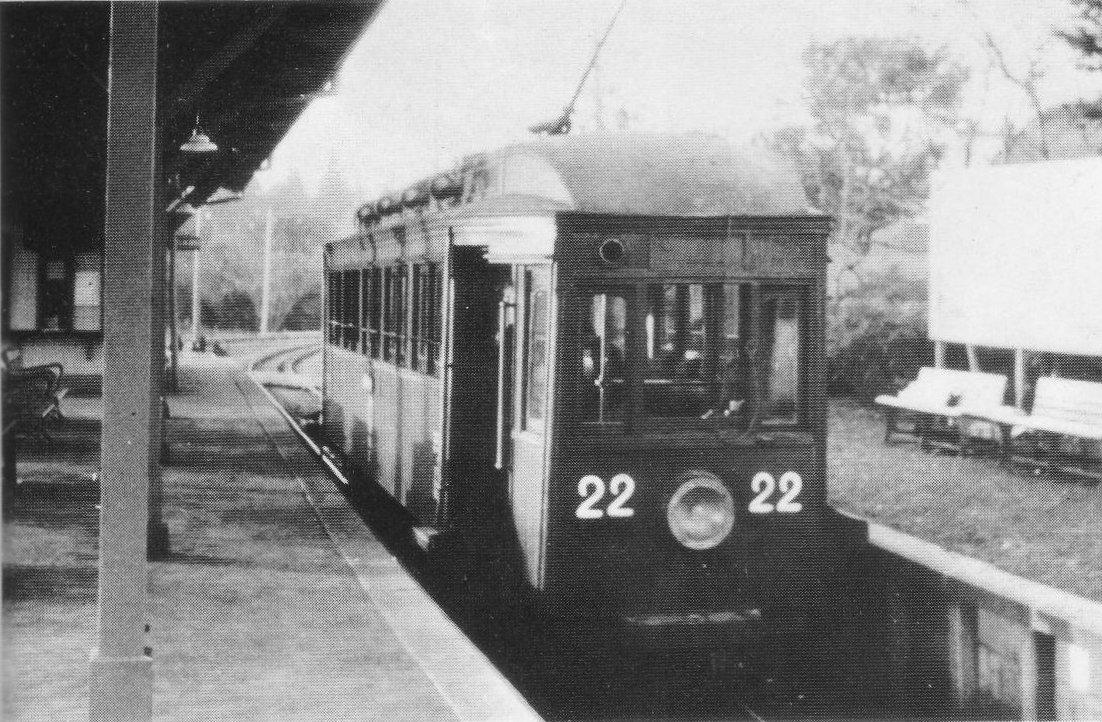
A Tamako Railway train at Kokubunji Station in 1937

The Tamako Railway opened the Kokubunji to Hagiyama section in 1928, and extended it to Musashi-Yamato in 1930, electrifying the entire section at 600 V DC at the same time. The company was absorbed into the Seibu Railway system on 12 March 1940. In 1961, the line was extended to Seibu-yūenchi (now Tamako), and the voltage increased to 1,500 V DC at the same time.

9000 series trainsets were deployed on the Tamako Line from 1 October 2020.
