= Sayama Prefectural Natural Park (Tokyo) =

Park in Tokyo, Japan

Coordinates: 35°45′46″N 139°25′01″E

- 都立狭山自然公園
- Interactive map of Sayama Prefectural Natural Park
- Location: Tokyo, Japan
- Area: 7.75 km^{2} (2.99 sq mi)
- Established: March 15, 1951

Sayama Prefectural Natural Park (都立狭山自然公園, Toritsu Sayama shizen kōen) is a Prefectural Natural Park in Tokyo, Japan. The park was established in 1951 and derives its name from the Sayama Hills (狭山丘陵). Across the border in Saitama Prefecture is the Sayama Prefectural Natural Park (Saitama).

== See also ==
- National Parks of Japan
- Parks and gardens in Tokyo
