= Hagiyama Station =

Railway station in Higashimurayama, Tokyo, Japan

SS30 ST04 Hagiyama Station 萩山駅
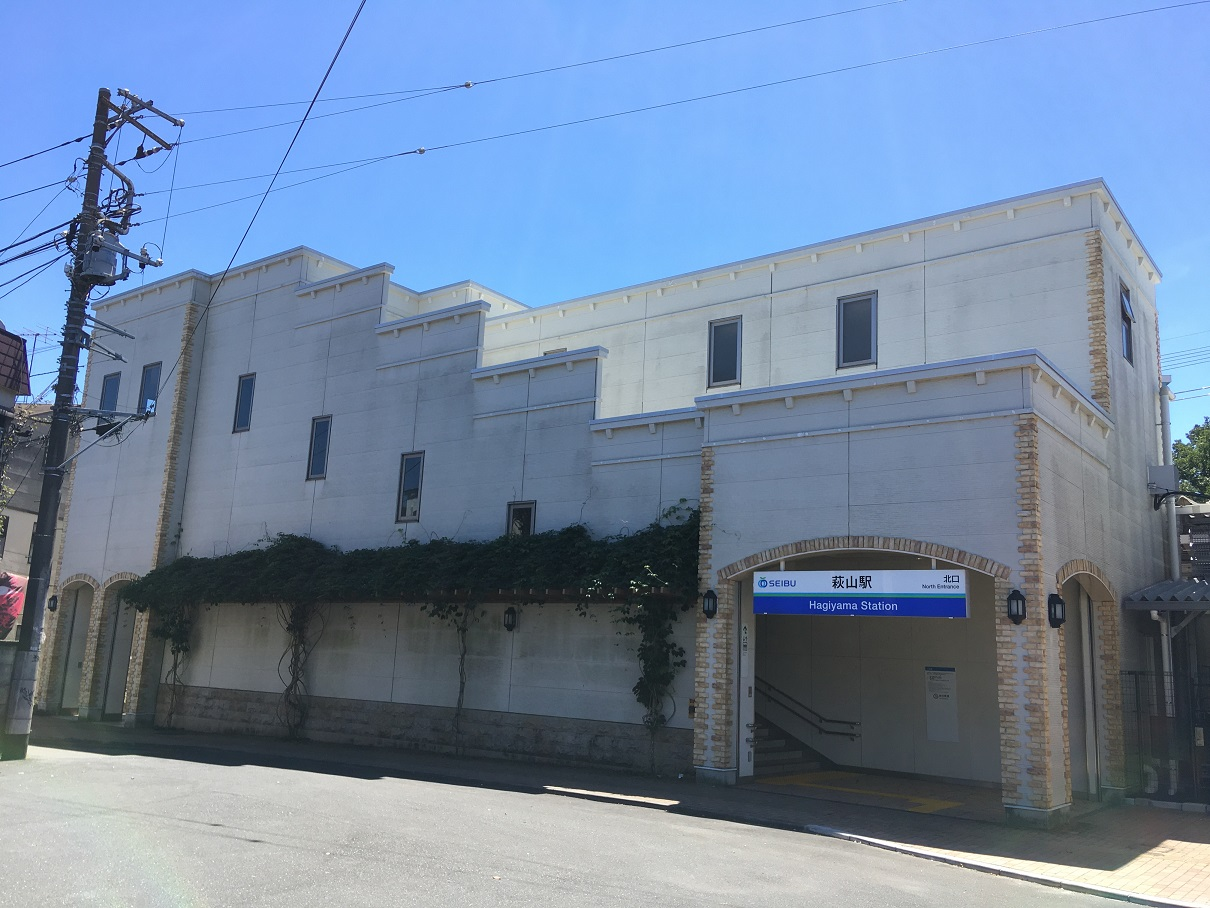
- North entrance to Hagiyama Station, August 2020

General information
- Location: 2-3-32 Honcho, Higashimurayama, Tokyo 189-0012; Japan
- Coordinates: 35°44′27″N 139°28′37″E
- Operator: Seibu Railway
- Lines: Seibu Haijima Line; Seibu Tamako Line
- Distance: 23.7 km from Seibu-Shinjuku
- Platforms: 1 island platform + 1 side platform

Other information
- Station code: SS30, ST04
- Website: Official website

History
- Opened: 6 April 1928

Passengers
- FY2019: 10,118 daily

Services
Preceding station	Seibu Railway	Following station
Ogawa SS31 towards Haijima	Haijima Liner	Kodaira SS19 towards Seibu-Shinjuku
through to Tamako Line	Haijima Line Express Local	Kodaira SS19 Terminus
Ogawa SS31 towards Haijima	Haijima Line Express Local	Kodaira SS19 Terminus
Ogawa SS31 towards Haijima	Haijima Line Semi Express	Kodaira SS19 Terminus
Yasaka ST05 towards Tamako	Tamako Line	Ōmekaidō ST03 towards Kokubunji
Yasaka ST05 towards Tamako	Tamako Line	through to Haijima Line
Location
- Location within Tokyo Location within Japan

Hagiyama Station (萩山駅, Hagiyama-eki) is a passenger railway station located in the city of Higashimurayama, Tokyo, Japan, operated by the private railway operator Seibu Railway. It functions as an interchange between the Seibu Haijima Line and the Seibu Tamako Line, both of which offer through services to the Seibu Shinjuku Line.

== Lines ==
Hagiyama Station is served by the Seibu Tamako Line and Seibu Haijima Line, with some through services to and from the Seibu Shinjuku Line. The station is located 4.6 kilometers from the terminus of the Seibu Tamako Line at Kokubunji and 23.7 kilometers from the terminus of the Seibu Haijima Line at Seibu Shinjuku.

=== Services ===
Eastbound Seibu Haijima Line trains for Kodaira and Seibu-Shinjuku depart from Track 3. Westbound Seibu Haijima Line trains for Tamagawa-Jōsui and Haijima depart from Track 2.

Most trains to Tamako leave from Track 2. These trains are direct trains from the Seibu Shinjuku Line.

Track 1 is used by Seibu Tamako Line trains running in both directions, mainly as a terminus for services to and from Kokubunji, but also through the Seibu Tamako Line to Tamako. Trains to/from Kokubunji, central Tokyo, and Tamako are timed to connect with each other and generally depart approximately every 10 minutes. Trains to Kokubunji occasionally depart from Platform 3, when Platform 1 is occupied by through trains to Tamako. This is due to the track layout.

All Local, Semi-Express, and Express trains stop at Hagiyama.

During the morning rush hours, some trains from Tamako and Haijima are coupled at Platform 3 to form ten-car express trains to central Tokyo.

== Station layout ==
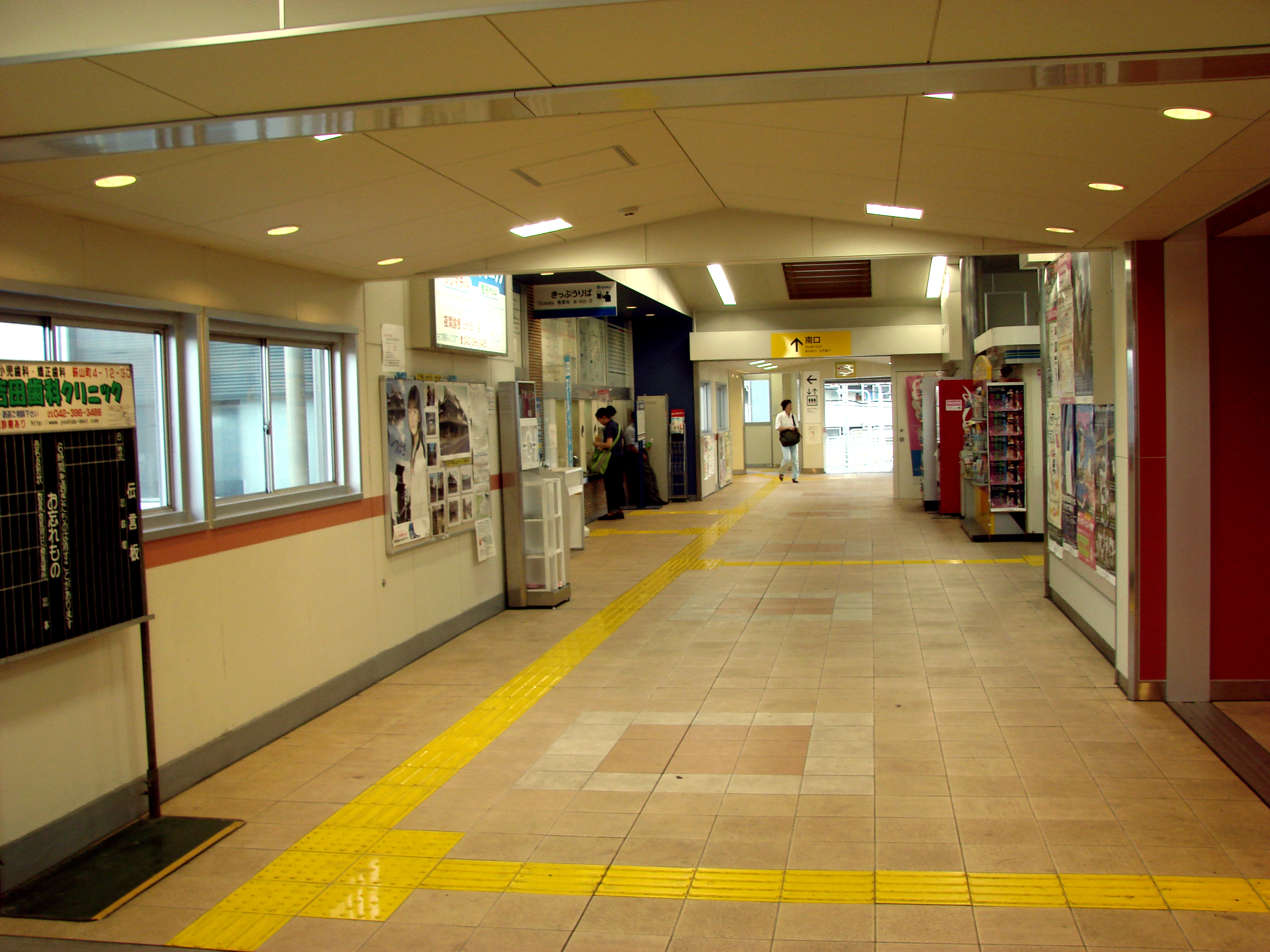
Station concourse

The elevated station concourse serves as a bridge connecting the two platforms. Access to the concourse is available from both the north and south side of the tracks, by lifts and stairs. At the south exit, the bridge also extends over the main road, facilitating crossing, although lift access is not available on the far side of the road. During opening hours, the concourse can be used by pedestrians wishing to traverse the railway tracks. Opposite the ticket office, three gates control access to the platforms. Lifts and stairs descend to the east end of the platforms that are at street level. A cross-over foot bridge is also provided at the west end of the platforms to allow easy transfer between the two lines.

=== Platforms ===
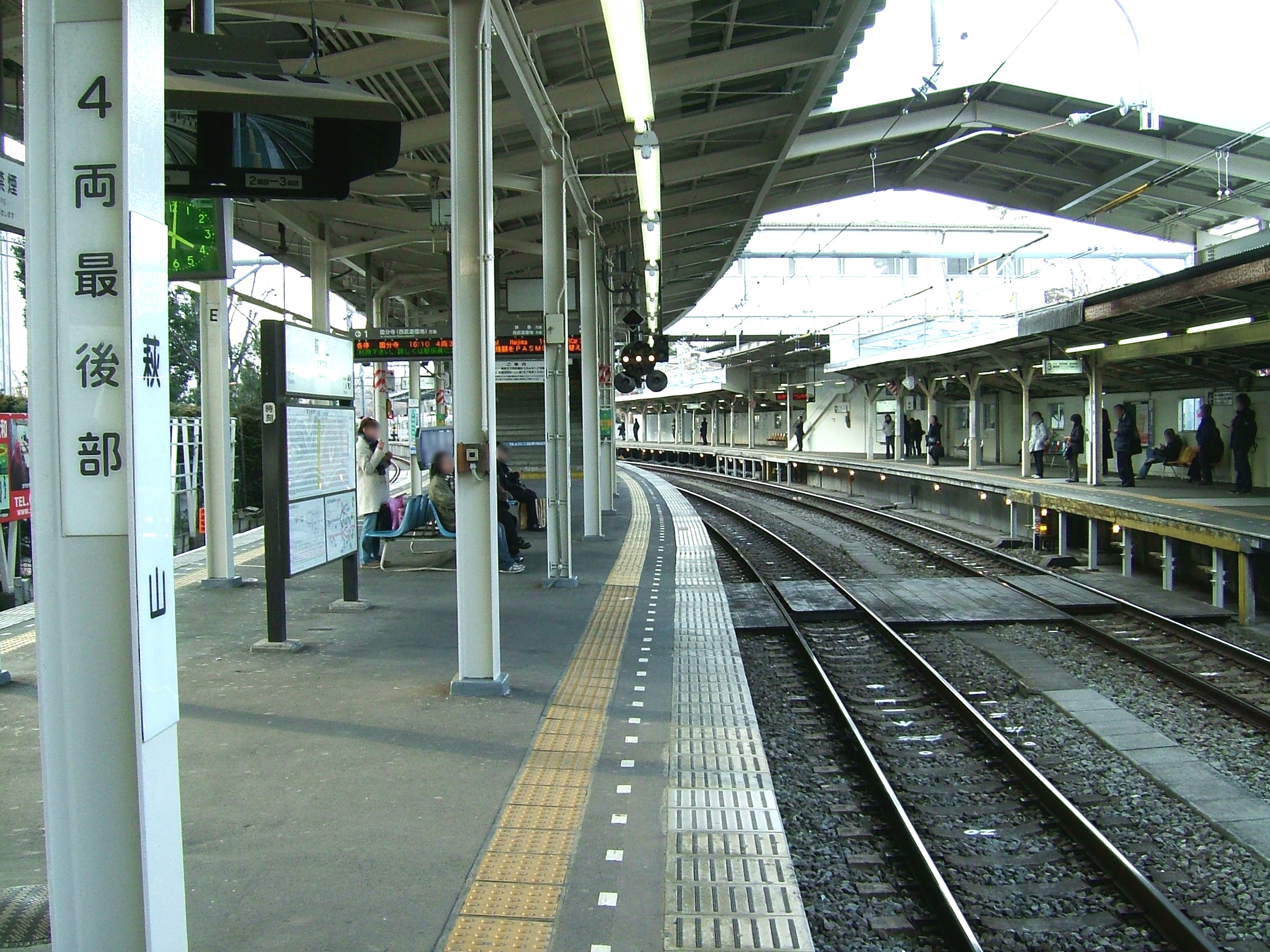
Platforms 1 and 2

The station consists of two platforms. One is an island platform serving trains on Tracks 1 and 2, and the other is a side platform serving trains on Track 3.

1	Seibu Tamako Line	for Kokubunji and Tamako
2	Seibu Haijima Line	for Haijima
2	Seibu Tamako Line	for Tamako
3	Seibu Haijima Line	for Kodaira, Takadanobaba, and Seibu-Shinjuku
3	Seibu Tamako Line	for Kokubunji

=== Hours of operation ===
Hagiyama Station's ticket office is open between 7:00 and 20:00.

=== Facilities ===
The station has sets of toilets at concourse level both outside and inside the ticket gates. The station has a staffed ticket office, as well as automatic ticket machines. Multilingual and Braille signage is available throughout the station. Within the ticket gates, a small kiosk operates at peak times. Several vending machines selling hot and cold beverages are distributed about the station

Taxis pick up passengers at the south exit. Bicycle parking is available for a fee outside the north side of the station, as is a small car parking lot.

== History ==
Hagiyama Station opened on 6 April 1928 as a station on a new line connecting Moto-Kodaira with a new platform at Kokubunji. The Hagiyama to Kokubunji section of this line now forms the Seibu Tamako Line. It was relocated to its present location on 16 September 1958 to allow direct trains to Tamako from Kodaira and central Tokyo. This realignment means that it is no longer possible to run trains from Kodaira to Kokubunji. A spur was later added to allow services to travel to Haijima via Ogawa, creating the Seibu Haijima Line.

In 1992, automatic ticket-collecting machines were installed.

Station numbering was introduced on all Seibu Railway lines during fiscal 2012, with Hagiyama Station becoming "SS30" on the Haijima Line and "ST04" on the Tamako Line.

=== 2008 refurbishment ===
New Seibu standard platform signs installed in 2008

A major refurbishment was completed in November 2008. As part of this work, four lifts were installed allowing step-free access to all platforms and from street level at both entrances. Additional barrier-free improvements include new universal access toilets and a Braille map of the station. This work followed campaign from local residents demanding this provision. The concourse was upgraded with additional toilets and new stairways and extensive external landscaping was carried out to the west entrance and east entrance, providing retail space for a stand-up noodle vendor adjacent to the station. Signage was upgraded on the platforms to the new Seibu Railways standard and multilingual concourse signs (Japanese, English, Chinese, and Korean) were also installed.

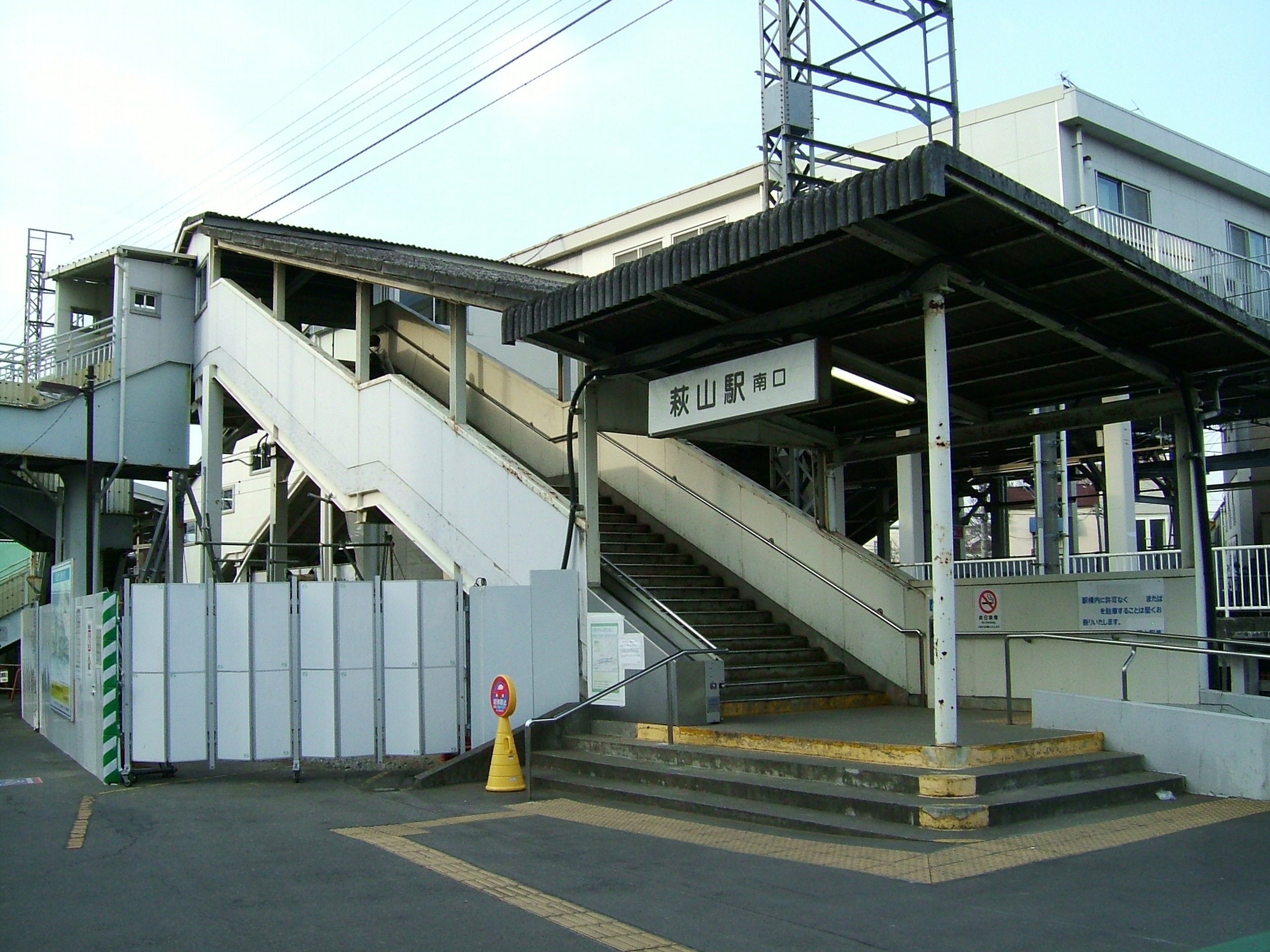
South pre-2008

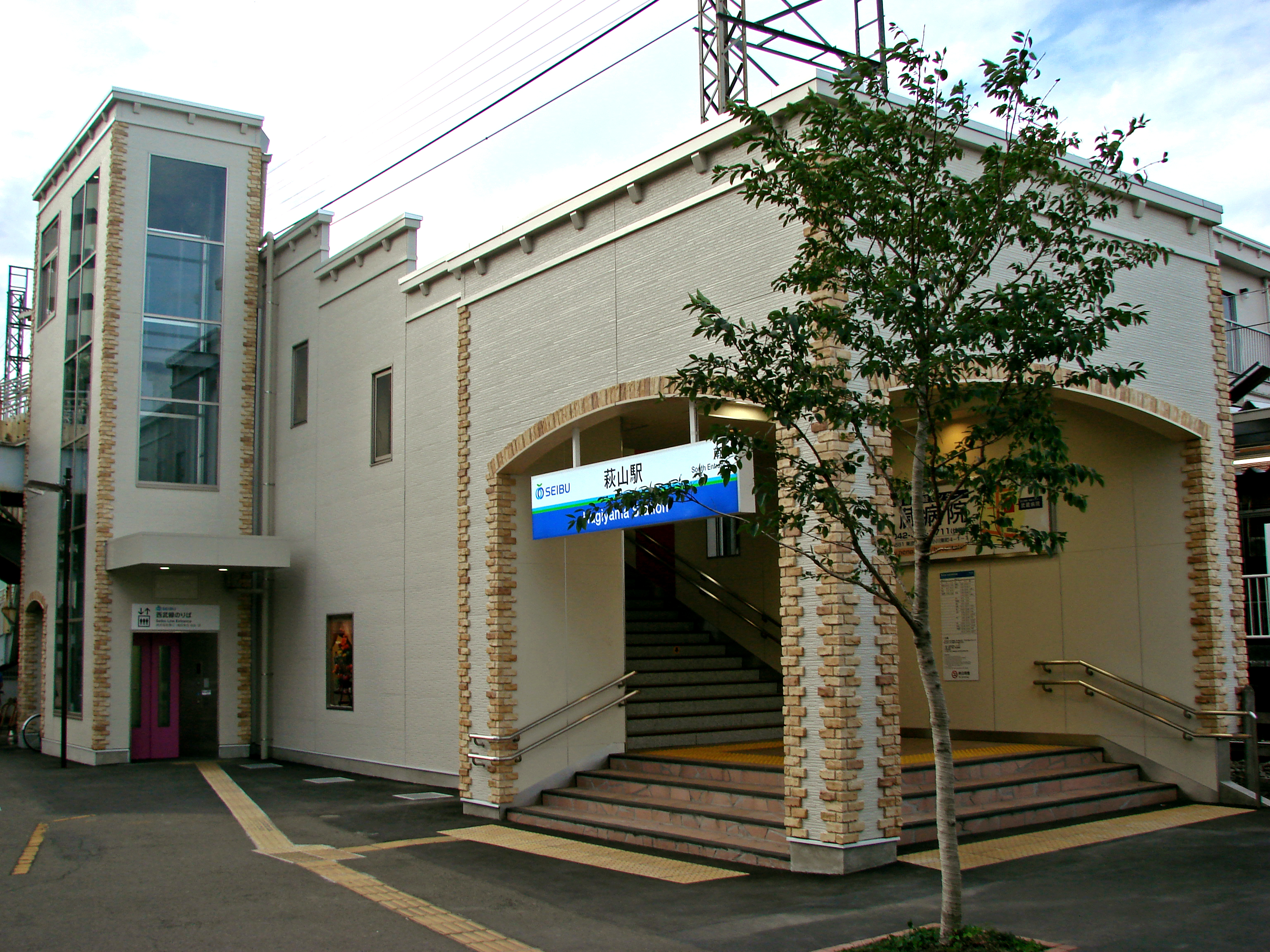
South 2009

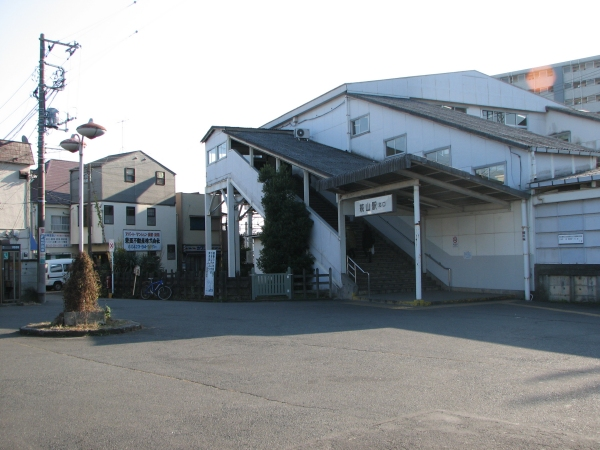
North pre-2008

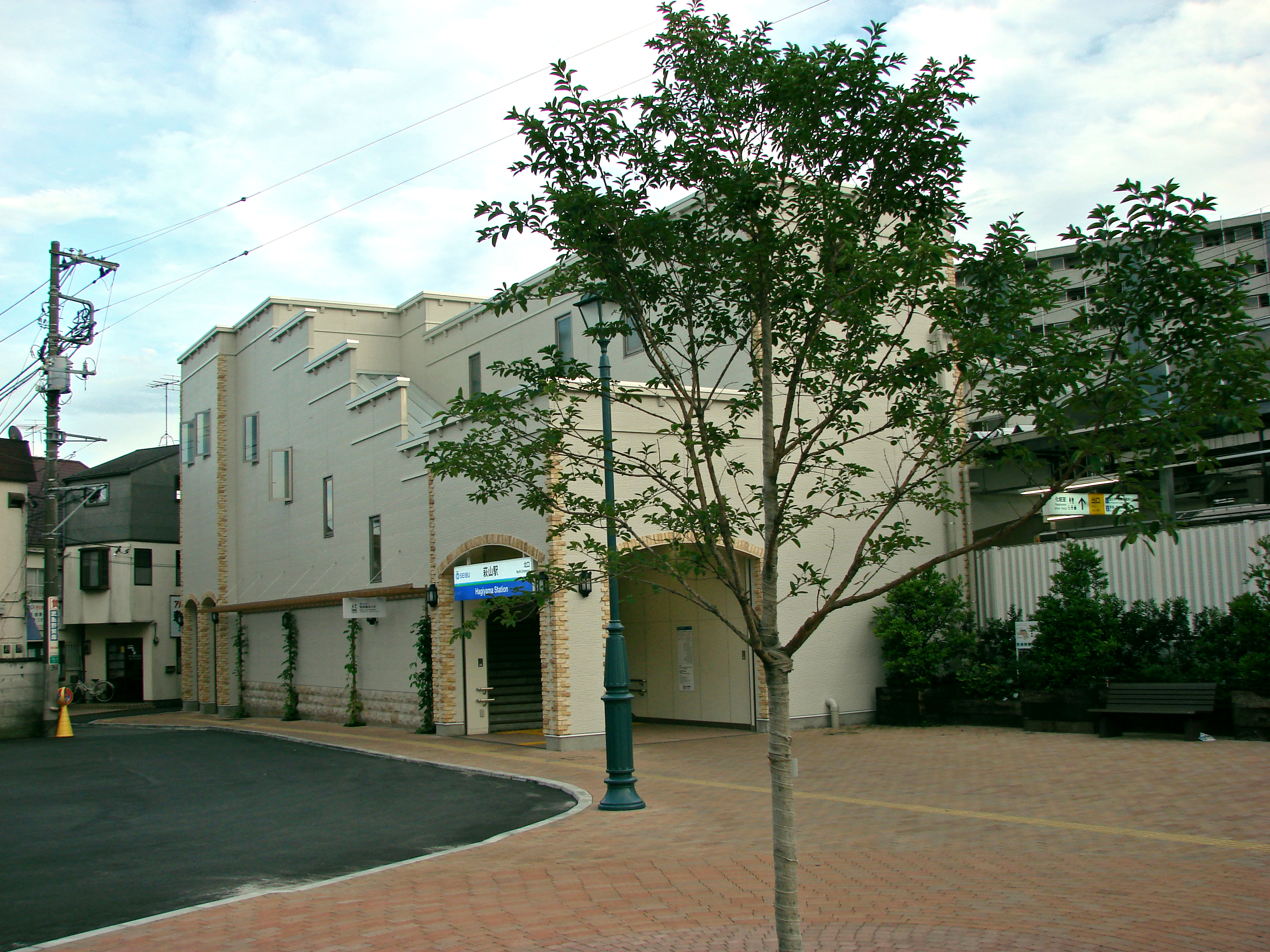
North 2009

== Passenger statistics ==
In fiscal 2019, the station was the 68th busiest on the Seibu network with an average of 10,118 passengers daily.

The passenger figures for previous years are as shown below.

Fiscal year	Daily average
2005	12,750
2010	13,236
2015	12,004

== Surrounding area ==
Although Hagiyama Station is located on the edge the city of Higashimurayama in western Tokyo, its south entrance provides access to the city of Kodaira.

The station provides the main access for the National Hospital Center of Neurology and Psychiatry (NCNP), one of the six National Medical Research Centers, which contains the National Institute of Neuroscience and the National Institute of Mental Health, and the National Musashi Hospital.

A Seibu Railway maintenance depot is located adjacent to Hagiyama Station. This depot provides workshops, offices, and storage, as well as dormitory accommodation for Seibu employees. The depot is located on the Seibu Tamako Line and an access route along the line provides direct access between the dormitories and Hagiyama Station.

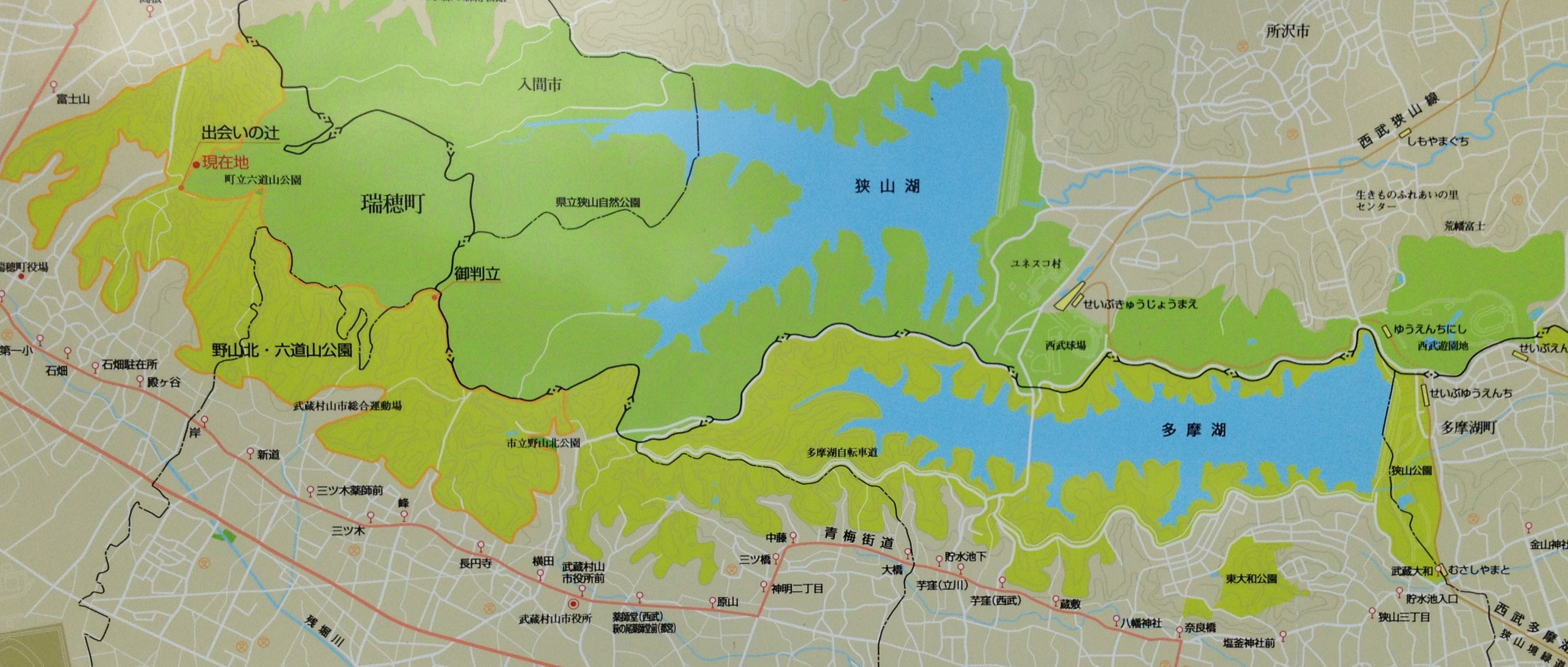
Lake Tama is depicted here on the bottom right.

Outside the north exit is Kodaira Green Road, a 21 km dedicated cycling and walking road circling Kodaira. The Hagiyama section of this road is also part of the Tamako Cycling Route (多摩湖自転車道, Tamako jitensha dō), also known as the Sayama Sakai Scenic Road, which extends 11 km to Lake Tama (the Murayama Reservoir) and Lake Sayama on top of a pipeline supplying water to much of Tokyo. The north exit also provides access to Hagiyama Park.

Also nearby is the headquarters and factory of Bridgestone Corporation, as well as the Tokyo Metropolitan Hagiyama business school.

== See also ==
- List of railway stations in Japan
