= Higashimurayama =

Higashimurayama 東村山市
- City
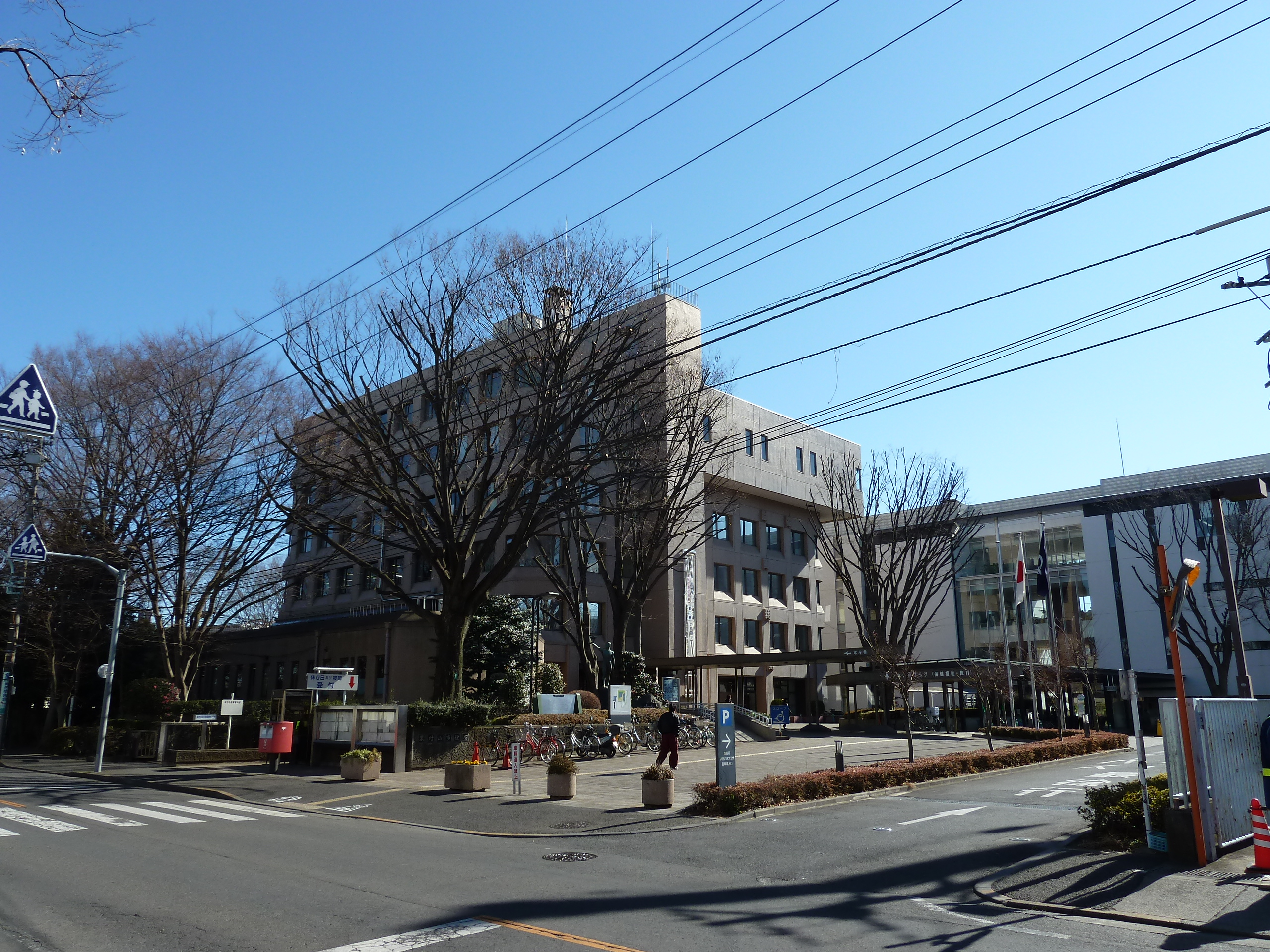
- Higashimurayama City Hall

- Flag Seal

- Location of Higashimurayama in Tokyo Prefecture

- Coordinates: 35°45′16.6″N 139°28′6.6″E
- Country: Japan
- Region: Kantō
- Prefecture: Tokyo

Area
  - Total: 17.14 km^{2} (6.62 sq mi)

Population (April 2021)
  - Total: 148,275
  - Density: 8,651/km^{2} (22,410/sq mi)
- Time zone: UTC+9 (Japan Standard Time)
- Symbols
  - Tree: Zelkova serrata
  - Flower: Azalea
  - Bird: White wagtail
- Phone number: 042-393-5111
- Address: 1-2-3 Honcho, Higashimurayama-shi, Tokyo-to 189-8501
- Website: Official website

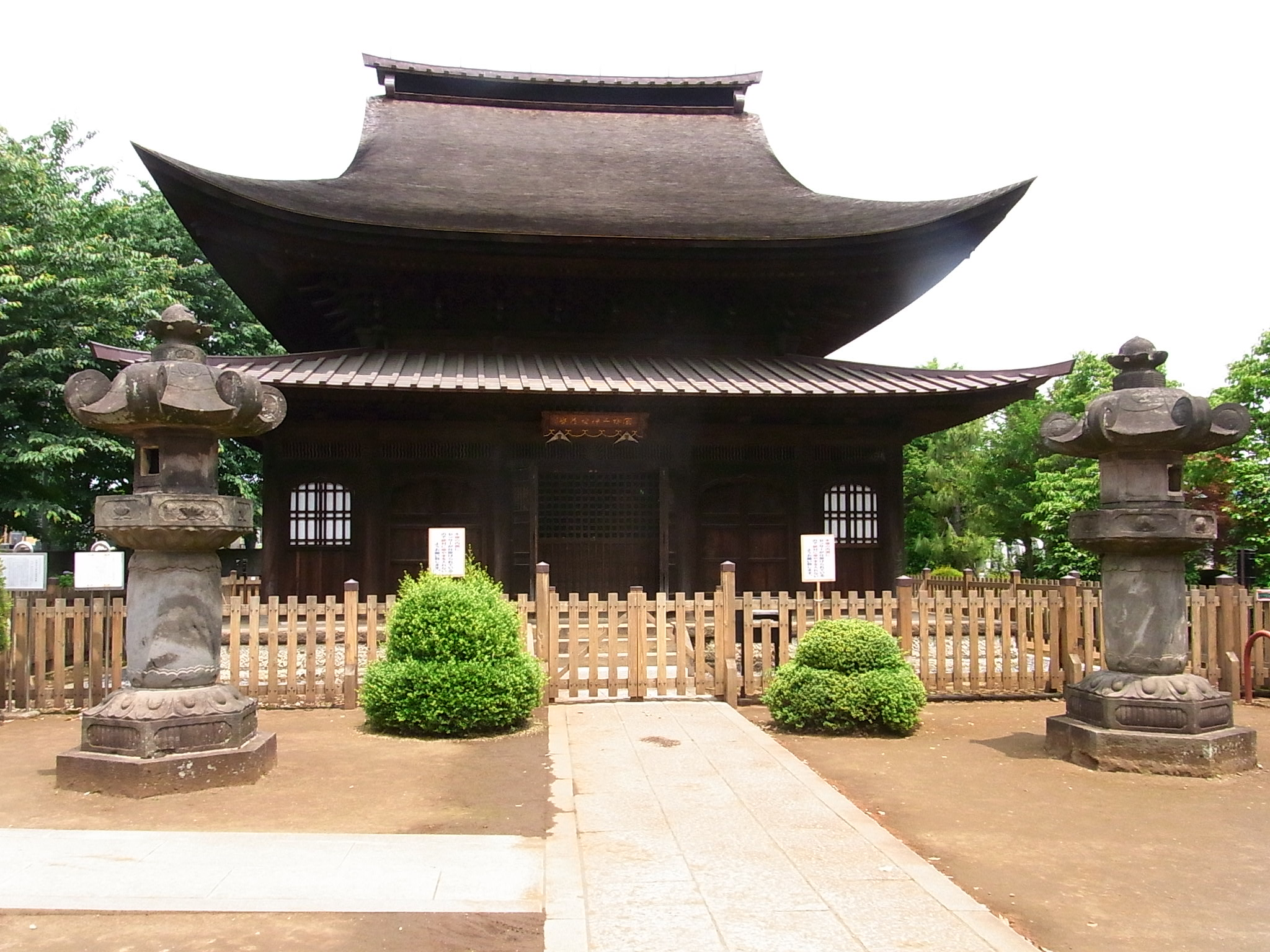
Shōfuku-ji Jizō-dō

Higashimurayama (東村山市, Higashi-murayama-shi) is a city located in the western portion of the Tokyo Metropolis, Japan. As of 1 March 2021, the city had an estimated population of 148,275, and a population density of 8700 persons per km^{2}. The total area of the city is 17.14 square kilometres (6.62 sq mi).

== Geography ==
Higashimurayama is located on the eastern edge of the Sayama Hills, almost in the center of the Musashino Terrace. Most of the city area is flat, except for the northwestern hills.

=== Surrounding municipalities ===
Tokyo Metropolis

- Higashikurume
- Kiyose
- Higashiyamato
- Kodaira

Saitama Prefecture

- Tokorozawa

=== Climate ===
Higashimurayama has a humid subtropical climate (Köppen Cfa) characterized by warm summers and cool winters with light to no snowfall. The average annual temperature in Higashimurayama is 14.0 °C. The average annual rainfall is 1647 mm with September as the wettest month. The temperatures are highest on average in August, at around 25.7 °C, and lowest in January, at around 2.3 °C.

== Demographics ==
Per Japanese census data, the population of Higashimurayama increased rapidly in the 1950s and 1960s and has plateaued in recent decades.

Historical population
Year	Pop.	±%
1920	7,798	—
1930	9,462	+21.3%
1940	11,402	+20.5%
1950	17,993	+57.8%
1960	46,946	+160.9%
1970	96,545	+105.7%
1980	119,363	+23.6%
1990	134,002	+12.3%
2000	142,290	+6.2%
2010	153,557	+7.9%
2020	151,815	−1.1%

== History ==
The area of present-day Higashimurayama has been inhabited since Japanese Paleolithic times, and numerous remains from the Jōmon, Yayoi and Kofun periods have been discovered. During the Nara period, it became part of ancient Musashi Province. During the Kamakura period, it was the location of the Battle of Kumegawa in 1333.

In the post-Meiji Restoration cadastral reform of April 1, 1889, several villages merged to form Higashimurayama Village in Kitatama District, at that time part of Kanagawa Prefecture. The entire district was transferred to the control of Tokyo Prefecture(東京府) on April 1, 1893. On April 1, 1942, Higashimurayama Village became the town of Higashimurayama. On April 1, 1964, Higashimurayama was elevated to city status.

== Government ==
Higashimurayama has a mayor-council form of government with a directly elected mayor and a unicameral city council of 25 members. Higashimurayama, collectively with Higashiyamato and Musashimurayama, contributes three members to the Tokyo Metropolitan Assembly. In terms of national politics, the city is part of Tokyo 20th district of the lower house of the Diet of Japan.

== Economy ==
Higashimurayama was formerly an agricultural area, and was noted for its production of sweet potatoes. It is now primary a regional commercial center, and a bedroom community for central Tokyo.

== Transportation ==
=== Railway ===
JR East – Musashino Line

- Shin-Akitsu

Seibu Railway – Seibu Shinjuku Line

- Higashi-Murayama - Kumegawa

Seibu Railway – Seibu Haijima Line

- Hagiyama

Seibu Railway – Seibu Kokubunji Line

- Higashi-Murayama

Seibu Railway – Seibu Tamako Line

- Hagiyama - Yasaka - Musashi-Yamato - Tamako

Seibu Railway – Seibu Ikebukuro Line

- Akitsu

Seibu Railway – Seibu Seibu-en Line

- Higashi-Murayama – Seibuen

Seibu Railway – Seibu Yamaguchi Line

- Tamako

== Highways ==
Higashimurayama is not served by any national highways or expressways.

== Education ==
The city has two public high schools operated by the Tokyo Metropolitan Board of Education.

- Higashimurayama High School
- Higashimurayama Nishi High School

Higashimurayama has 15 public elementary schools and seven public junior high schools operated by the city government.

Public junior high schools:

- Higashimurayama No. 1 (東村山第一中学校)
- Higashimurayama No. 2 (東村山第二中学校)
- Higashimurayama No. 3 (東村山第三中学校)
- Higashimurayama No. 4 (東村山第四中学校)
- Higashimurayama No. 5 (東村山第五中学校)
- Higashimurayama No. 6 (東村山第六中学校)
- Higashimurayama No. 7 (東村山第七中学校)

Public elementary school:

- Akitsu (秋津小学校)
- Akitsu Higashi (秋津東小学校)
- Aoba (青葉小学校)
- Fujimi (富士見小学校)
- Hagiyama (萩山小学校)
- Higashi Hagiyama (東萩山小学校)
- Kasei (化成小学校)
- Kitayama (北山小学校)
- Kumegawa (久米川小学校)
- Kumegawa Higashi (久米川東小学校)
- Megurita (回田小学校)
- Minamidai (南台小学校)
- Nobidome (野火止小学校)
- Onta (大岱小学校)
- Yasaka (八坂小学校)

There are also three private combined junior/senior high schools.

- Meiho Junior & Senior High School
- Meiji Gakuin Junior High School & Meiji Gakuin Higashimurayama High School
- Nittaidai Ohka High School - Junior and senior high school

== Local attractions ==
- The oldest intact building in Tokyo and one of only two buildings in Tokyo registered as a National Treasure of Japan; the Jizō hall in the temple of Shōfuku-ji.
- Hachikokuyama, a park that is an inspiration for My Neighbor Totoro.
- National Hansen's Disease Museum of Japan
- Site of the 14th century Battle of Kumegawa
- A segment of the ancient Kamakura Kaido highway

== Sister cities ==
Higashimurayama is twinned with the following cities:

City	Region	Country	Year
Kashiwazaki	Niigata	Japan	1996
Independence	Missouri	United States	1978
Suzhou	(China) Jiangsu	China	2005

== Notable people from Higashimurayama ==
- Seiichiro Shimizu, Politician
- Ken Shimura, Comedian
- Shoko Aida, Singer
- Miki Nakatani, Actress
- Shōji Satō, Professional Badminton Player
- Karen Miyama, Actress
