= Tamako Station =

Railway station in Higashimurayama, Tokyo, Japan

ST07 SY01 Tamako Station 多摩湖駅
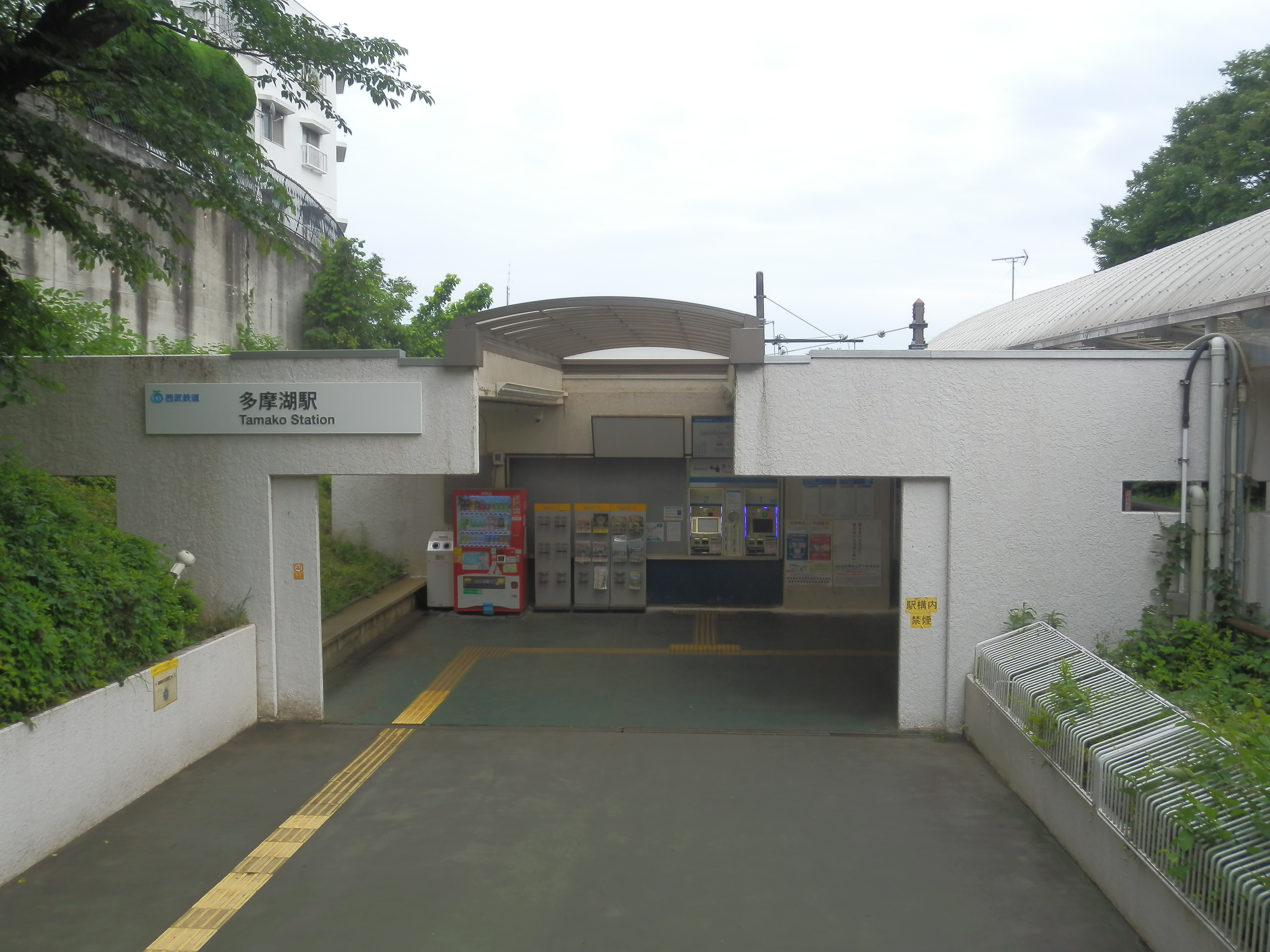
- Tamako Station northern entrance in June 2021

General information
- Location: 3 Tamako-cho 3, Higashimurayama-shi, Tokyo 189-0026; Japan
- Coordinates: 35.766°N 139.4426°E
- Operator: Seibu Railway
- Lines: Seibu Yamaguchi Line; Seibu Tamako Line
- Distance: 9.2 km from Kokubunji
- Platforms: 1 island platform

Other information
- Station code: ST07, SY01
- Website: Official website

History
- Opened: 30 December 1936
- Former names: Murayama Chosuichi Station (to 1941); Sayama Kōen-mae Station (to 1951); Tamako Station(to 1975); Seibu-yūenchi Station(to 2021)

Passengers
- FY2019: 2587

Services
Preceding station	Seibu Railway	Following station
Terminus	Tamako Line	Musashi-Yamato ST06 towards Kokubunji
Seibuen-yūenchi SY02 towards Seibukyūjō-mae	Yamaguchi Line	Terminus
Location
- Location within Tokyo Location within Japan

Tamako Station (多摩湖駅, Tamako-eki) is a junction passenger railway station located in the city of Higashimurayama, Tokyo, Japan, operated by the private railway operator Seibu Railway.

== Lines ==
Tamako Station is a terminus of the Seibu Tamako Line, and is located 9.2 kilometers from the opposing terminus of that line at Kokubunji. A limited number of through services continue on to the Seibu Shinjuku line during the morning rush hour. The station is also a terminus of the 2.8 kilometer Seibu Yamaguchi Line.

== Station layout ==
The station has one island platform for the Seibu Tamako Line, part of which is cut away to form a bay platform for the Seibu Yamaguchi Line.

=== Platforms ===
1, 2	Seibu Tamako Line	for Hagiyama and Kokubunji
3	Seibu Yamaguchi Line	for Seibukyūjō-mae

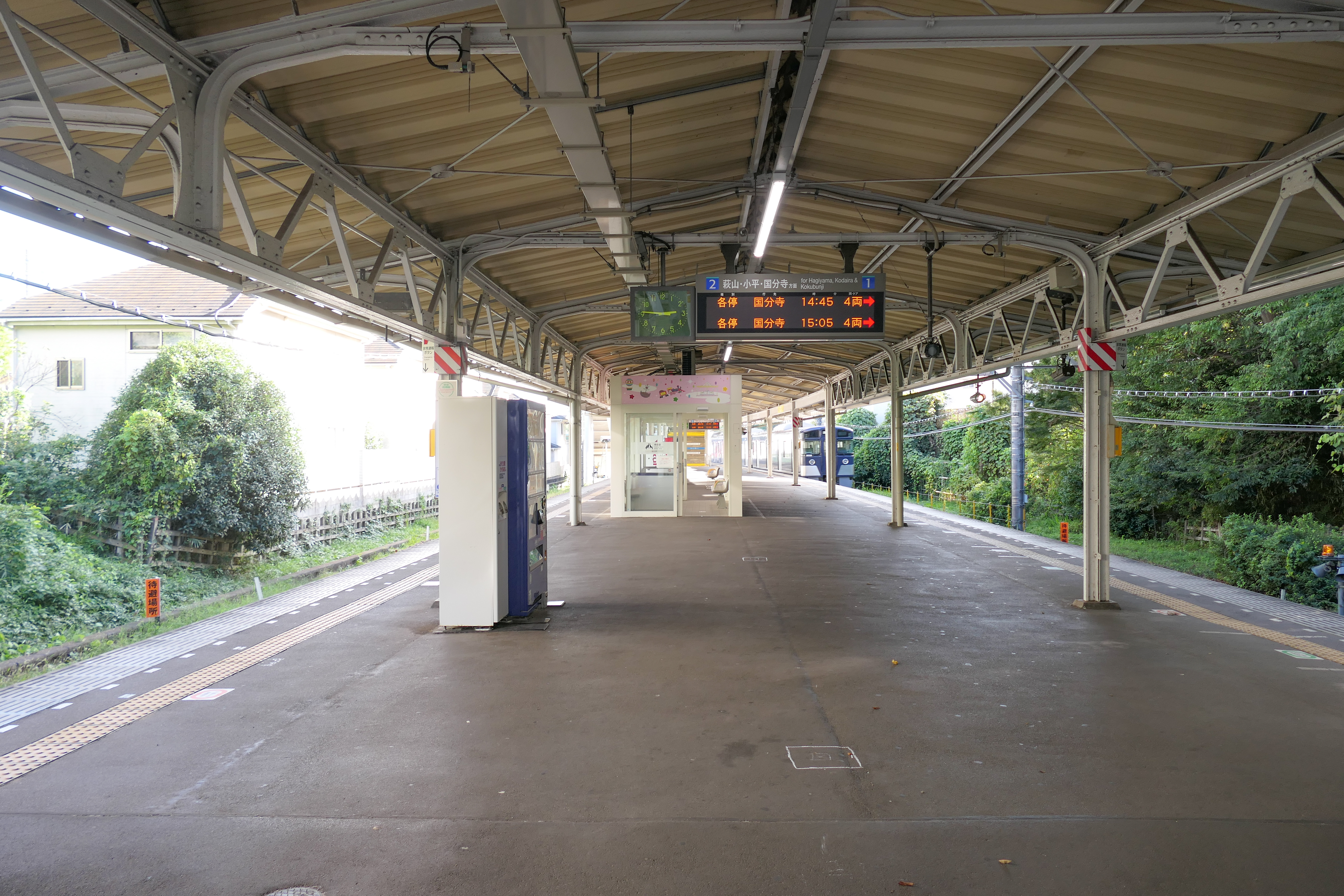
Seibu Tamako Line platforms, October 2021

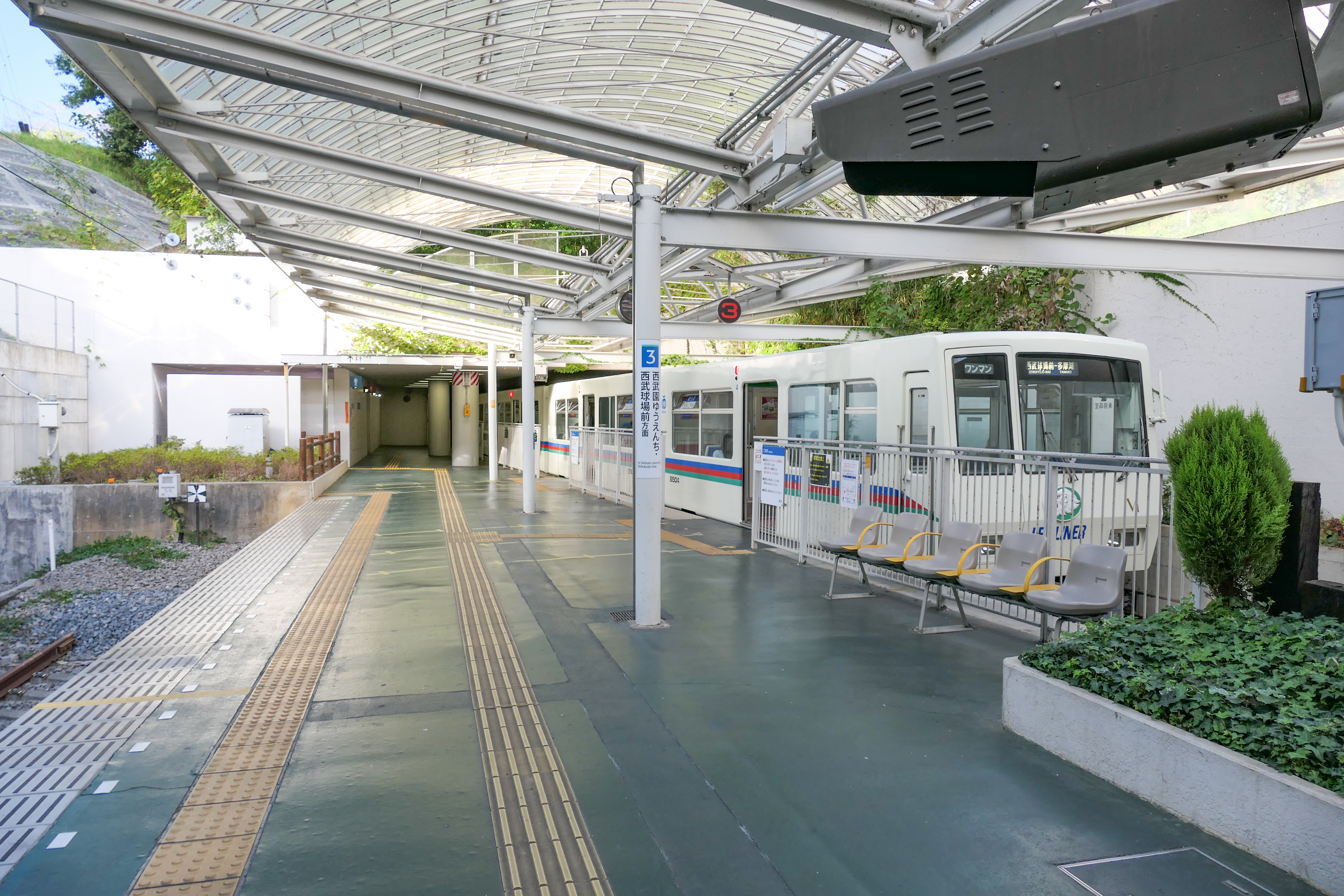
Seibu Yamaguchi Line platform, October 2021

== History ==
The station opened on 30 December 1936 as Murayama Chosuichi Station (村山貯水池駅). It was renamed Sayama Kōen-mae Station (狭山公園前駅) on 1 April 1941, and renamed Tamako Station (多摩湖駅) on 1 November 1951. The station was relocated 400 meters north to its present location on 20 September 1961, and was renamed Seibu-yūenchi Station (西武遊園地駅) on 25 March 1975. On 13 March 2021 it was renamed to its current station name.

Station numbering was introduced on all Seibu Railway lines during fiscal 2012, with this station becoming "ST07" for the Seibu Tamako Line and "SY01" for the Seibu Yamaguchi Line.

== Passenger statistics ==
In fiscal 2019, the station was the 84th busiest on the Seibu network, with an average of 2,587 passengers daily.

The passenger figures for previous years are as shown below.

Fiscal year	Daily average
2005	3,431
2010	3,000
2015	2,589

== See also ==
- List of railway stations in Japan
