= Seibu 2000 series =

Electric multiple unit train type operated by Seibu Railway in Japan

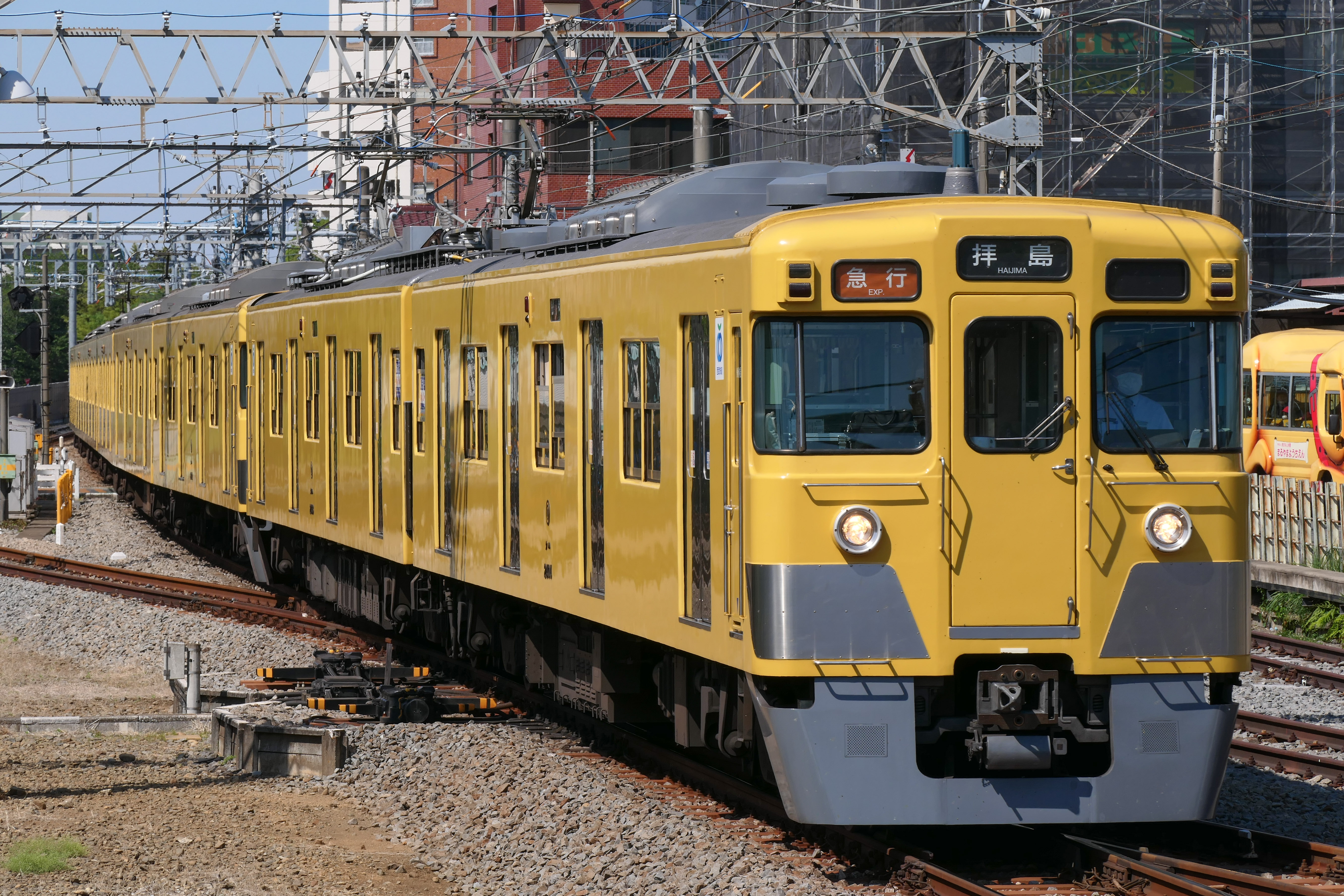
- A 2000 series train
- In service: 1977–2025
- Manufacturer: Seibu Tokorozawa Railway Works
- Constructed: 1976–1988
- Scrapped: 2015–2025
- Number built: 130 vehicles
- Number in service: None
- Number retired: 130 vehicles
- Formation: 2/6/8 cars per trainset
- Operator: Seibu Railway
- Lines served: Seibu Shinjuku Line; Seibu Haijima Line; Seibu Kokubunji Line

Specifications
- Car body construction: Steel
- Car length: 20,000 mm (65 ft 7 in)
- Width: 2,876.5 mm (9 ft 5.25 in)
- Height: 4,065 mm (13 ft 4.0 in)
- Floor height: 880 mm (2 ft 11 in)
- Doors: 4 pairs per side
- Maximum speed: 105 km/h (65 mph)
- Traction system: Field Chopper control
- Acceleration: 2.6 km/(h⋅s) (1.6 mph/s)
- Deceleration: 3.5 km/(h⋅s) (2.2 mph/s) (service); 4.0 km/(h⋅s) (2.5 mph/s) (emergency)
- Electric system: 1,500 V DC overhead catenary
- Current collection: Pantograph
- Braking system: Regenertive brake along with electric commanding brake
- Safety system: ATS
- Multiple working: New 2000 series
- Track gauge: 1,067 mm (3 ft 6 in)

Seibu New 2000 series
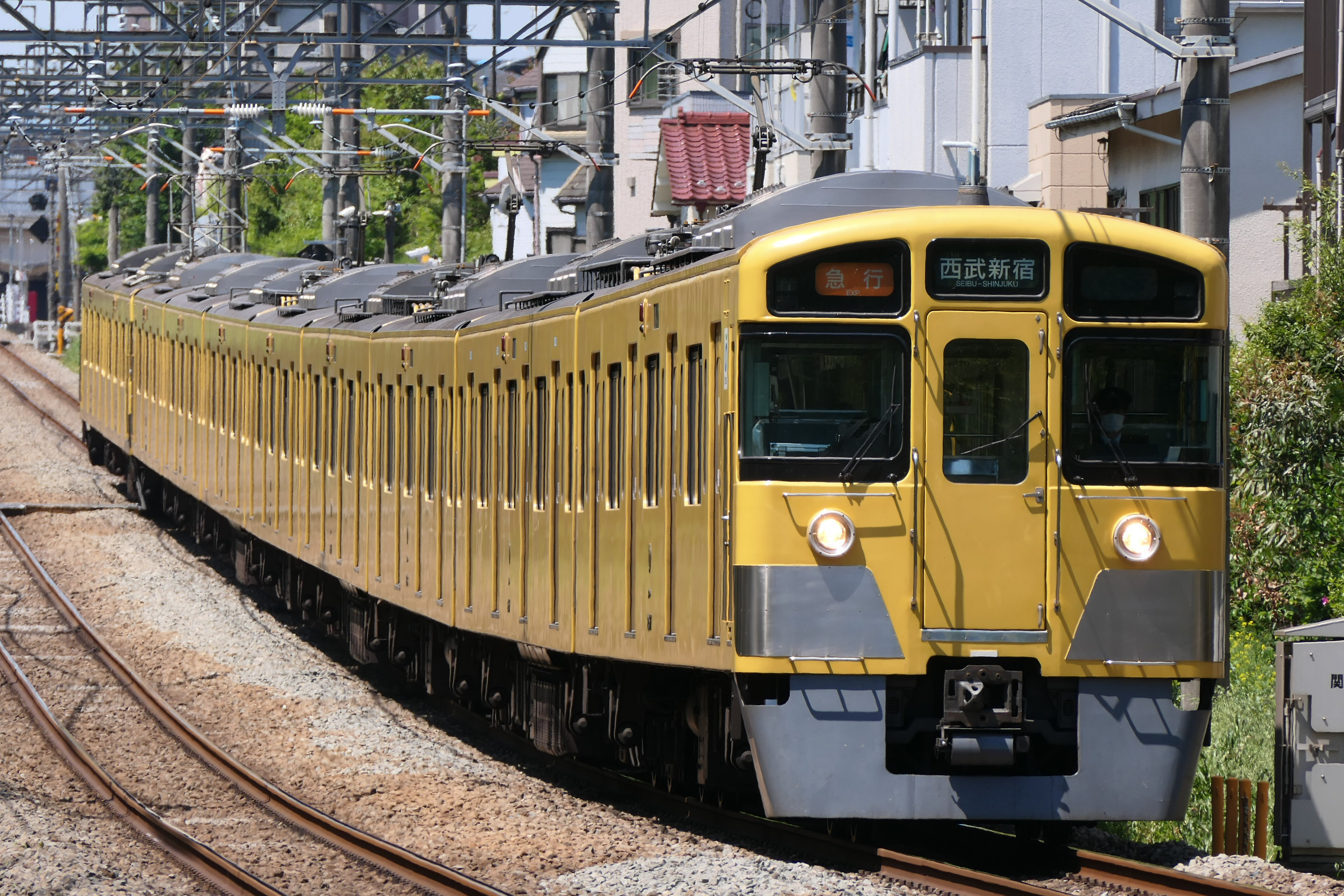
- A New 2000 series train
- Manufacturers: Seibu Tokorozawa Railway Works, Tokyu Car Corporation
- Constructed: 1988–1993
- Entered service: 1988
- Scrapped: 2016–
- Number built: 314 vehicles
- Number in service: 102 vehicles (31 sets)
- Number retired: 212 vehicles
- Formation: 2/4/6/8 cars per trainset
- Operator: Seibu Railway
- Depots: Kotesashi, Minami-iriso, Tamagawajo-sui, Musashigaoka
- Lines served: Seibu Ikebukuro Line; Seibu Toshima Line; Seibu Shinjuku Line; Seibu Haijima Line; Seibu Kokubunji Line; Seibu Seibuen Line

Specifications
- Car body construction: Steel
- Doors: 4 pairs per side
- Maximum speed: 105 km/h (65 mph)
- Traction system: Field Chopper control Variable frequency (GTO)
- Acceleration: 2.6 km/(h⋅s) (1.6 mph/s)
- Deceleration: 3.5 km/(h⋅s) (2.2 mph/s) (service); 4.0 km/(h⋅s) (2.5 mph/s) (emergency)
- Electric system: 1,500 V DC overhead catenary
- Current collection: Pantograph
- Braking system: Regenertive brake along with electric commanding brake
- Safety system: ATS
- Multiple working: 2000 series
- Track gauge: 1,067 mm (3 ft 6 in)

The Seibu 2000 series (西武2000系) is an electric multiple unit (EMU) train type operated by the private railway operator Seibu Railway on commuter services in the Tokyo area of Japan since 1977. Though the Seibu 2000 series were built from 1976 to 1993, trains manufactured from 1988 were very different from previous models, and these are classified as the New 2000 series.

== Fleet ==
As of 3 October 2026, the fleet consists of 102 vehicles formed as two-car, four-car, six-car, and eight-car sets, and is based at Kotesashi, Musashigaoka, Minami-Iriso, Tamagawa-Josui depots for use on the Seibu Shinjuku Line and Seibu Ikebukuro Line.

== Interior ==
Seating consists of longitudinal bench seating throughout. Priority seats are provided at the end of each car.

=== 2000 series ===
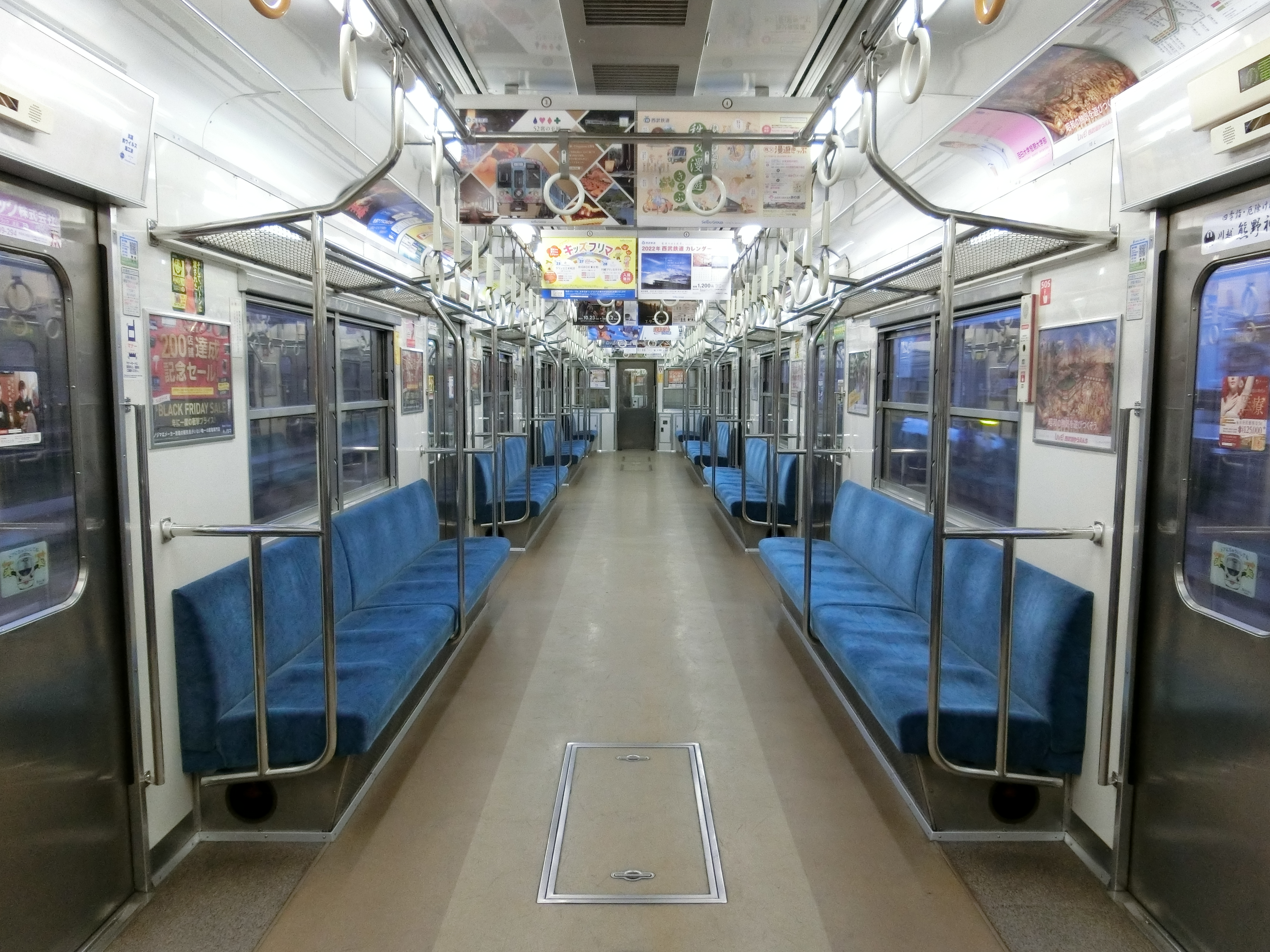
Interior view

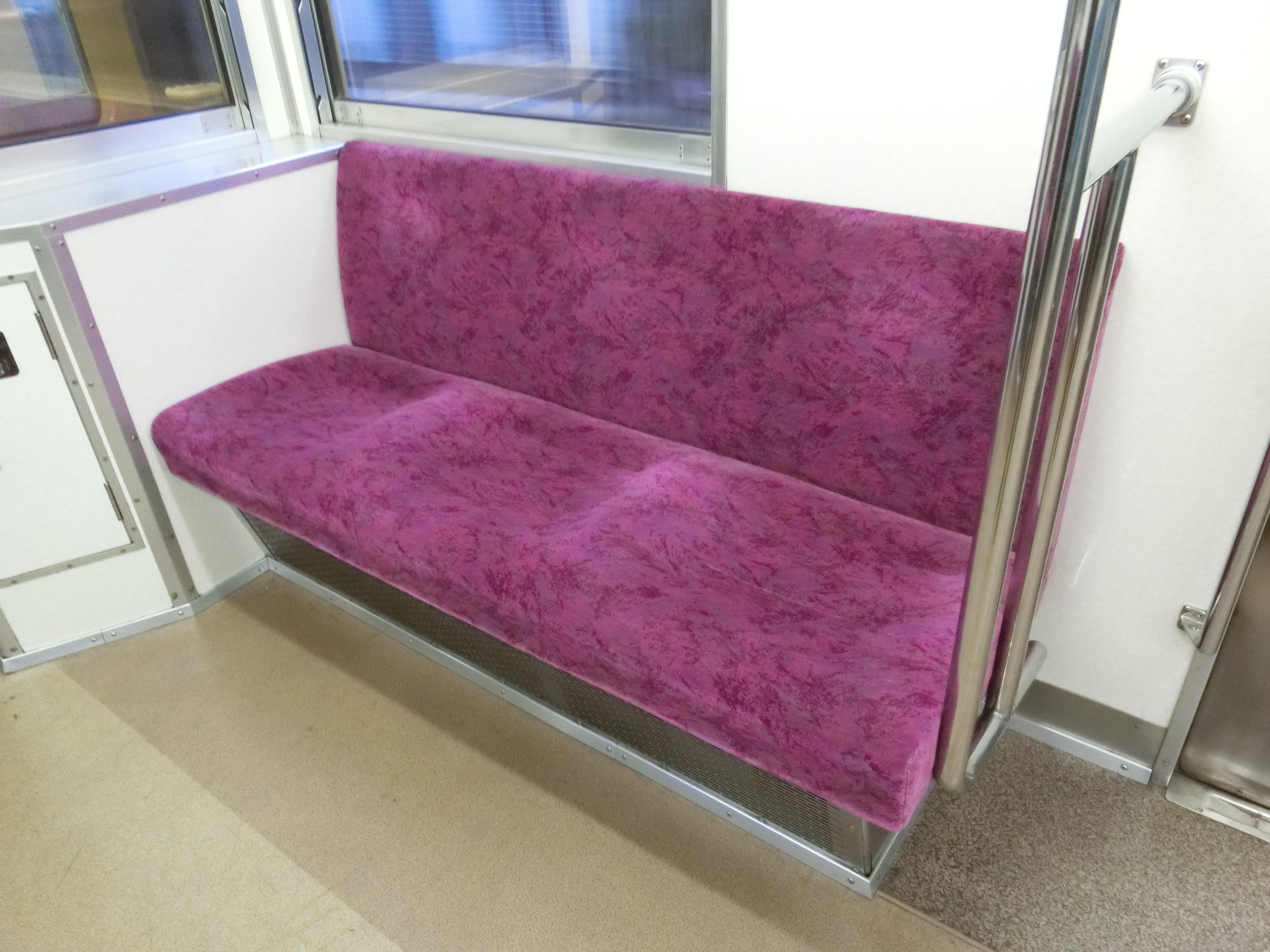
Priority seating

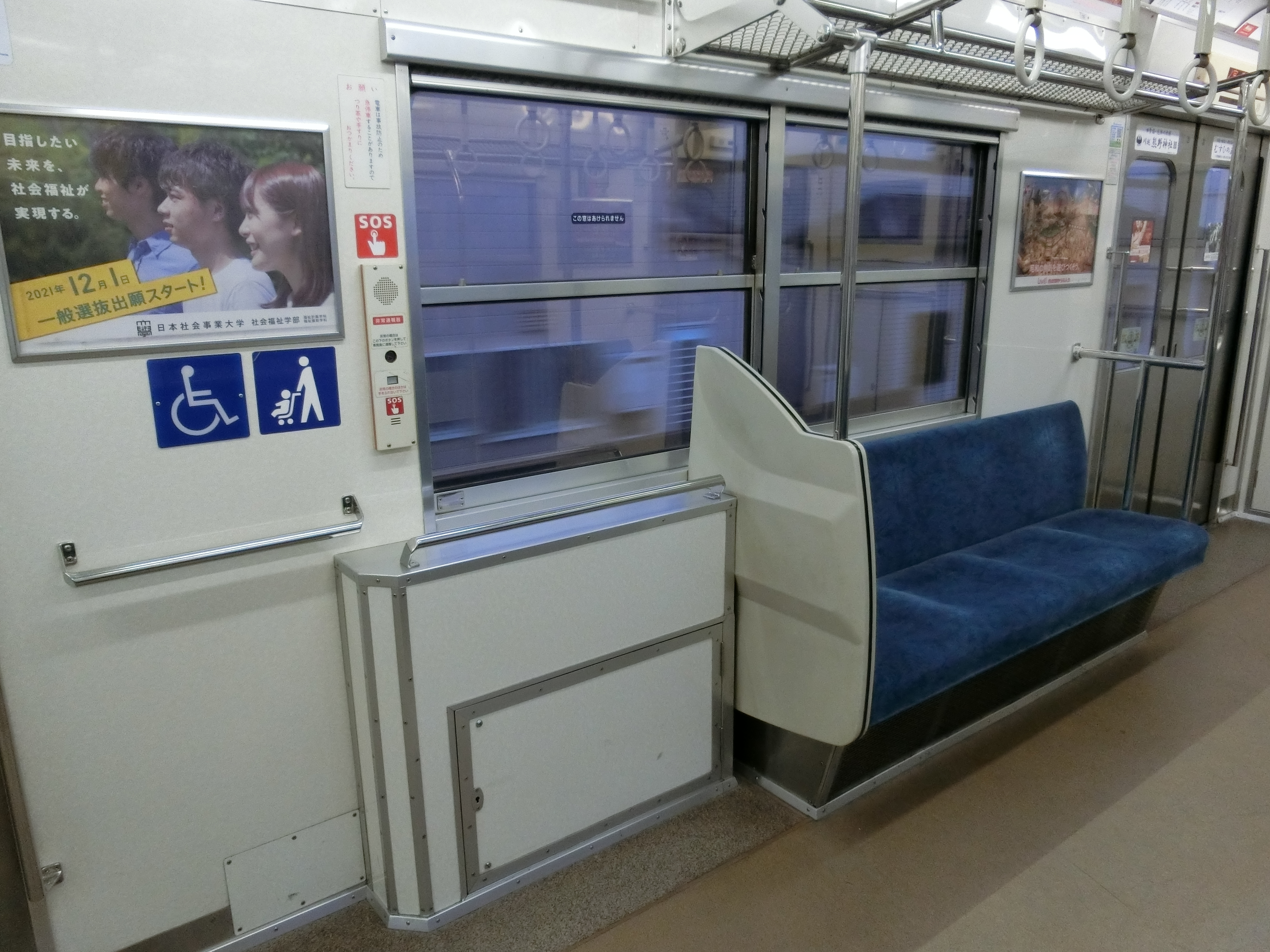
Wheelchair space

=== New 2000 series ===
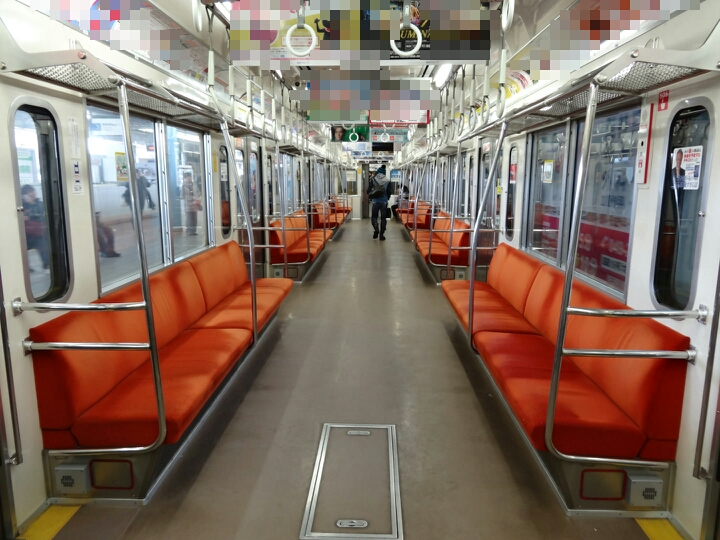
Early-style interior in 2014

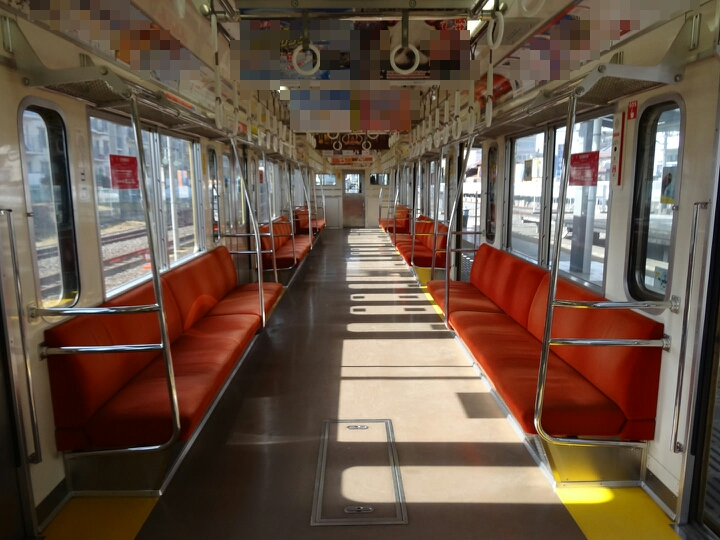
Mid-style interior in 2014

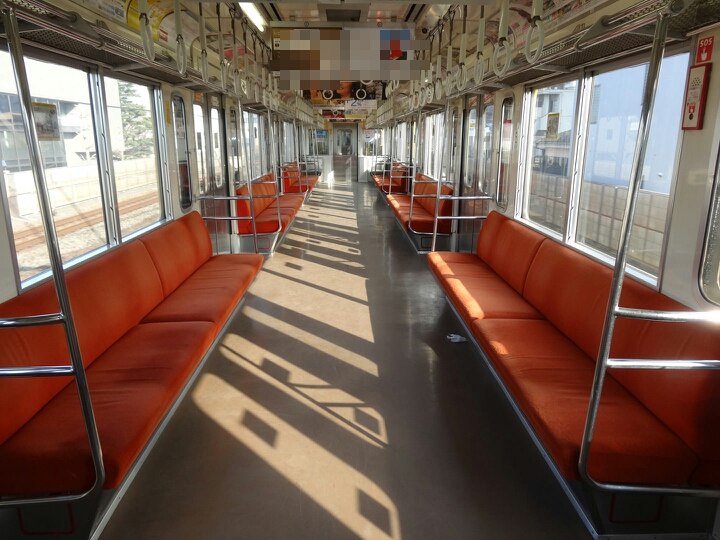
Late-style interior in 2014

For renewed type 2000 series interior, see renewal section.

== History ==
The 2000 series trains were introduced on local train services on the Seibu Shinjuku Line in 1977, featuring four pairs of sliding doors on each side to speed up boarding and alighting at stations, and they were initially formed as six-car sets.

The last early-model 2000 series eight-car set, 2007, was withdrawn in April 2022. Train set 2055 (a first generation six-car set) was manufactured in January 1989 and was set with a vehicle number of -10 in September 1991 and became 2045 in order to avoid number depletion due to the increase of eight-car train sets. A new eight-car set, 2055 (second generation), was manufactured from December 1992 to March 1993. This second-generation set 2055 was manufactured after set 2097, and this is the final train set of the new 2000 series.

=== Transfer to Ohmi Railway ===
In 2025, multiple two-car sets were transferred to Ohmi Railway, a wholly owned subsidiary of Seibu. The first of these sets began service on 18 November of that year.

== Renewal ==
From new 2000 series train sets that were more than 20 years after they were made, a renewal and some fixing of the parts were started. The first renewal was made to the train set 2047 (6 cars) which were renewed from December 2007 to March 2008. The renewal contents include:

=== Exterior ===
- Changing the pantographs to single-arm type.
- Replacing the original destination displays with full-color LED displays. (Note: When it was refurbished, it was still not full color-LED, but it was made full-color LED afterwards.)
- Adding a number plate at the cab front to indicate the set number. (example: 2077)
- On the side of the train, the part that shows the number of the train set was changed to a plate and windows on the door pockets were removed.
- To stop passengers from falling onto the train tracks, in some of the train sets, they placed a speaker to warn passengers.
- Exchanging the horn.
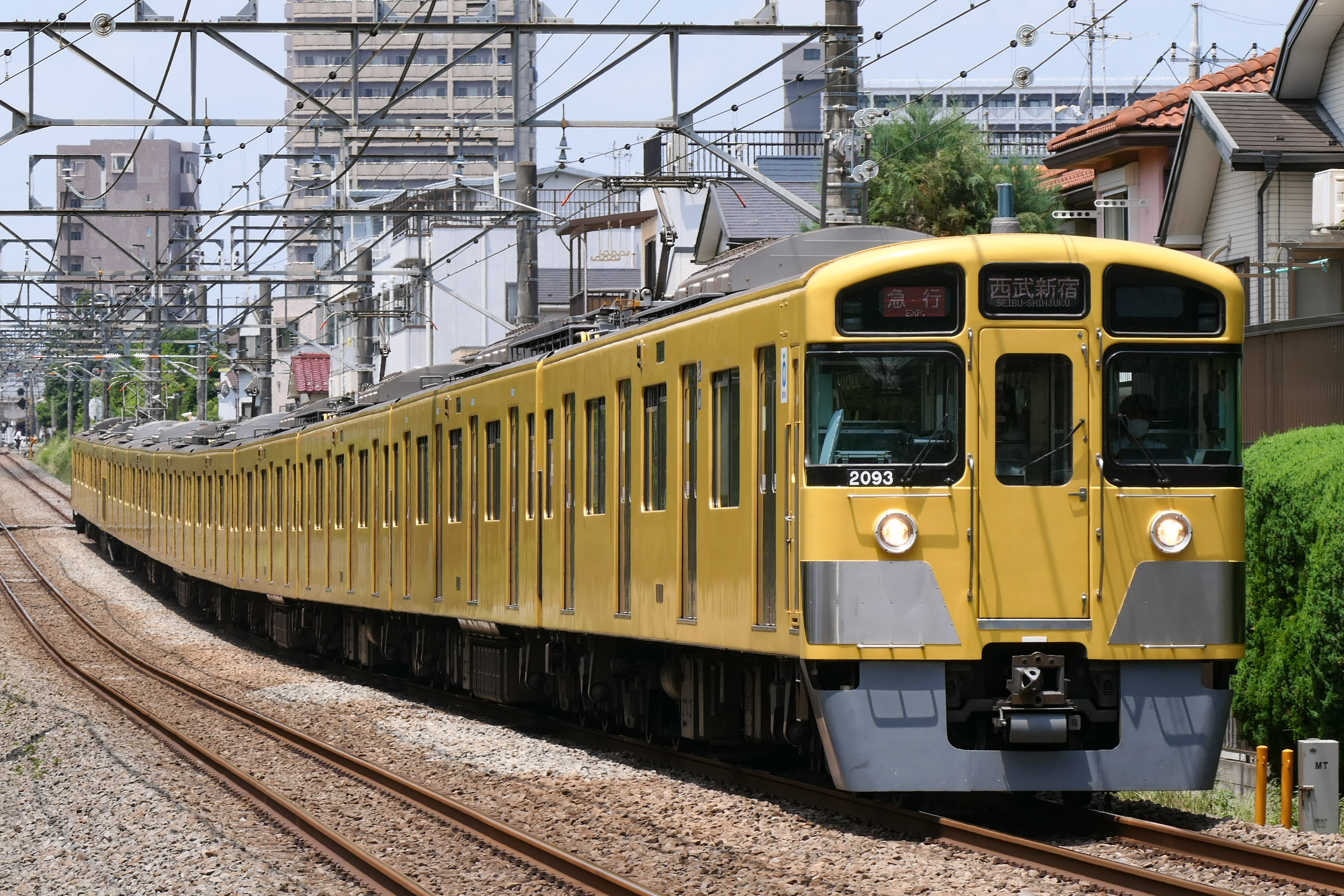
Train with added number plate at the cab front

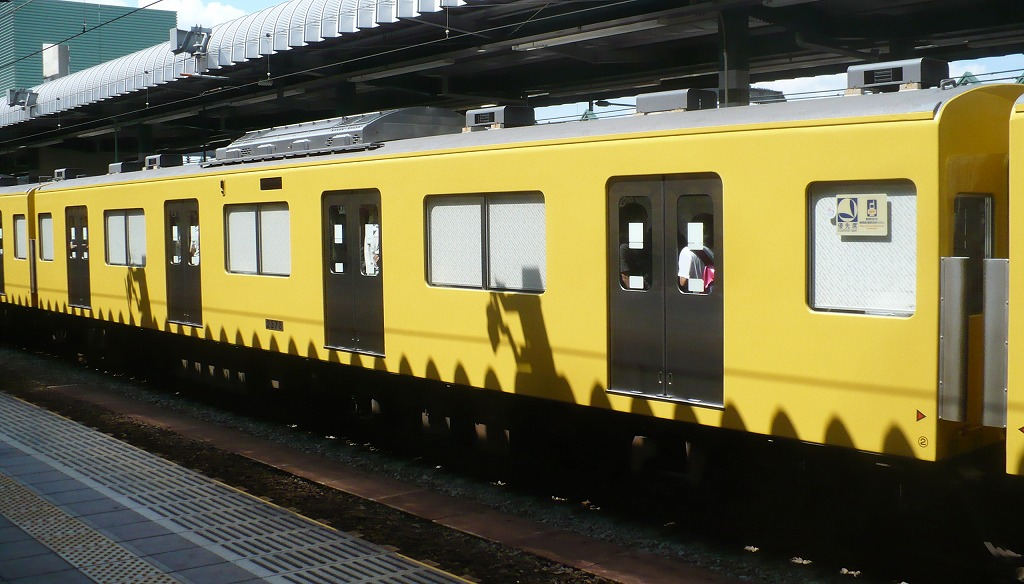
Intermediate car with door pocket windows removed and added plate number

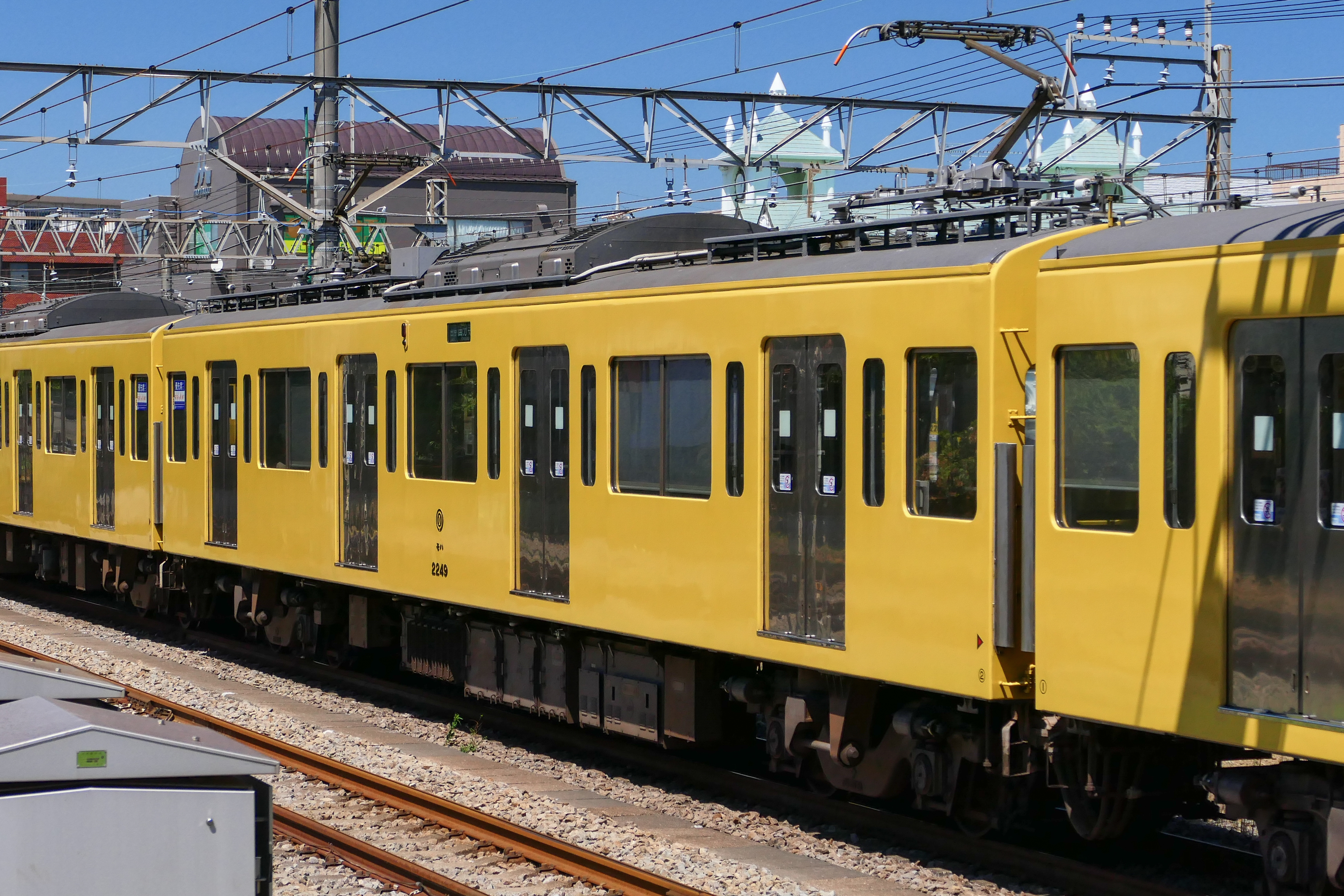
For comparison: unrefurbished intermediate car with door pocket windows and without numbering plate

=== Interior ===
- Changing the floor to grey rubber and in the areas close to the doors, the color of the floor became yellow.
- Changing the seat moquetteto blue for regular seats and to a purple-fire resistant material for priority seats. Similar to Seibu 30000 series, the S-spring is used for the cushion material. The curtains of the windows were also replaced. Also, the spaces that had the extra windows removed became advertisement spaces.
- Changing the material of the roof's air conditioning part to hard plastic from metal.
- Adding a door chime, changing the door engine and including an LED passenger information display above the train doors.
- Adding a wheelchair space and some other parts.
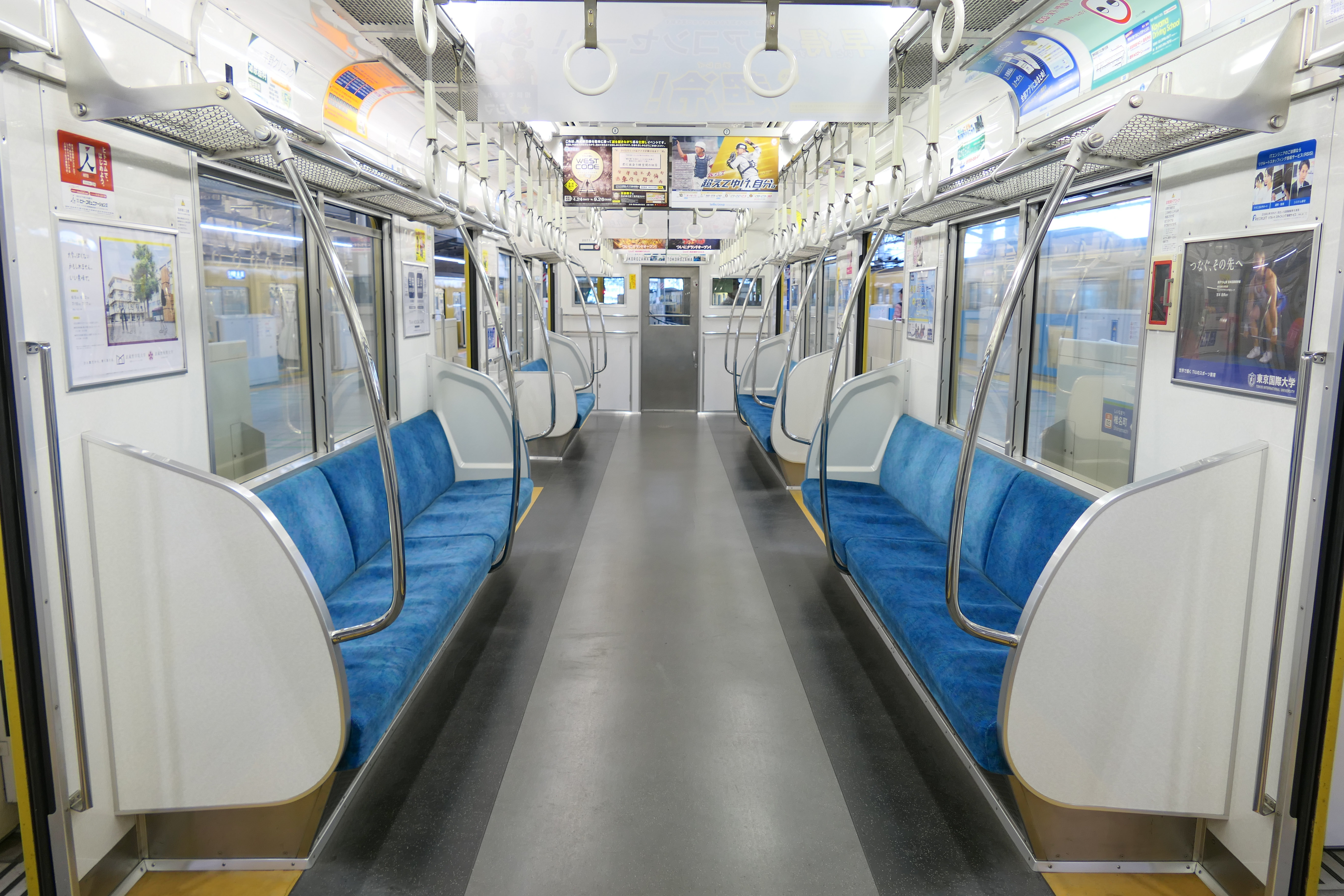
Interior view of a New 2000 series train after renewal

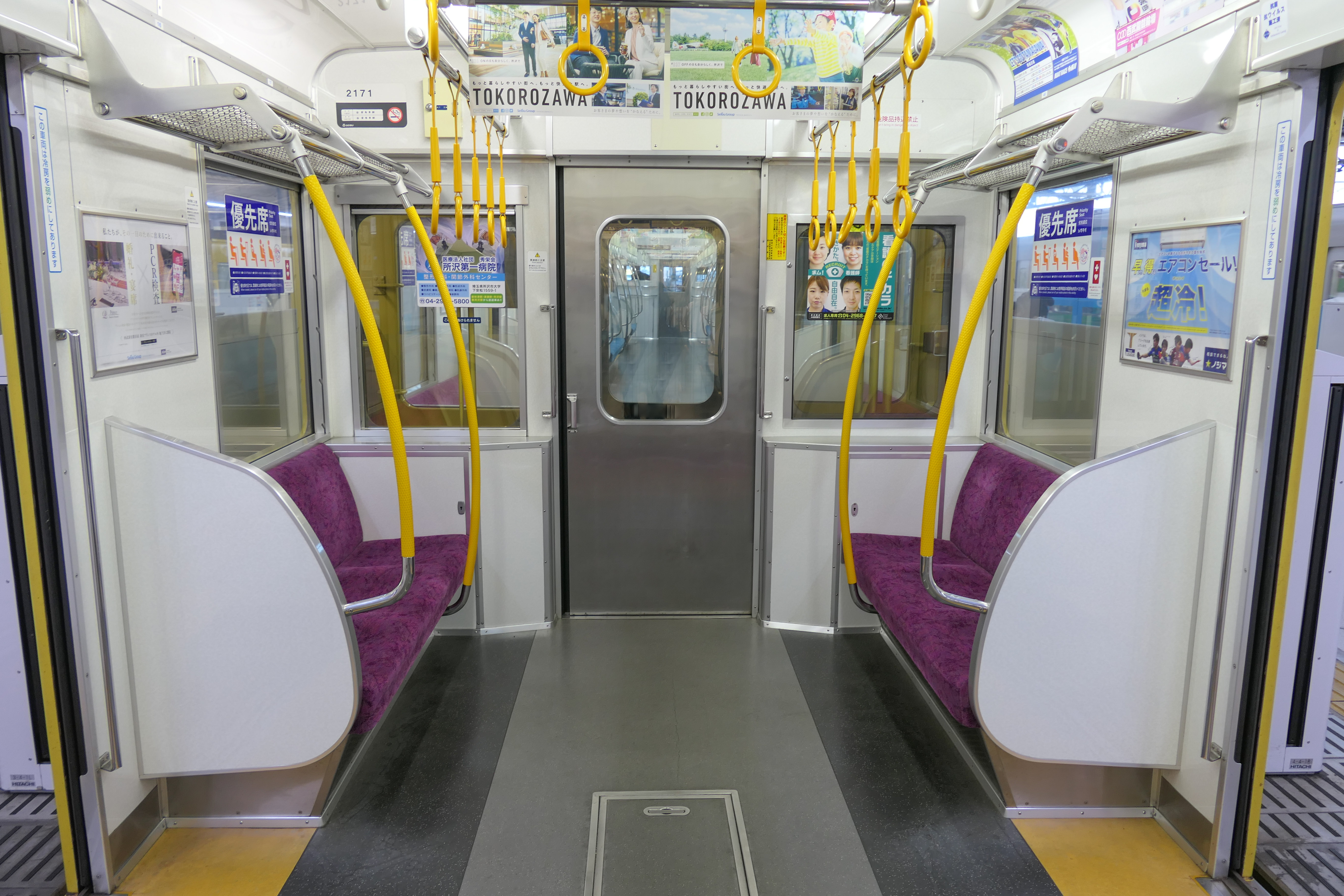
Priority seating

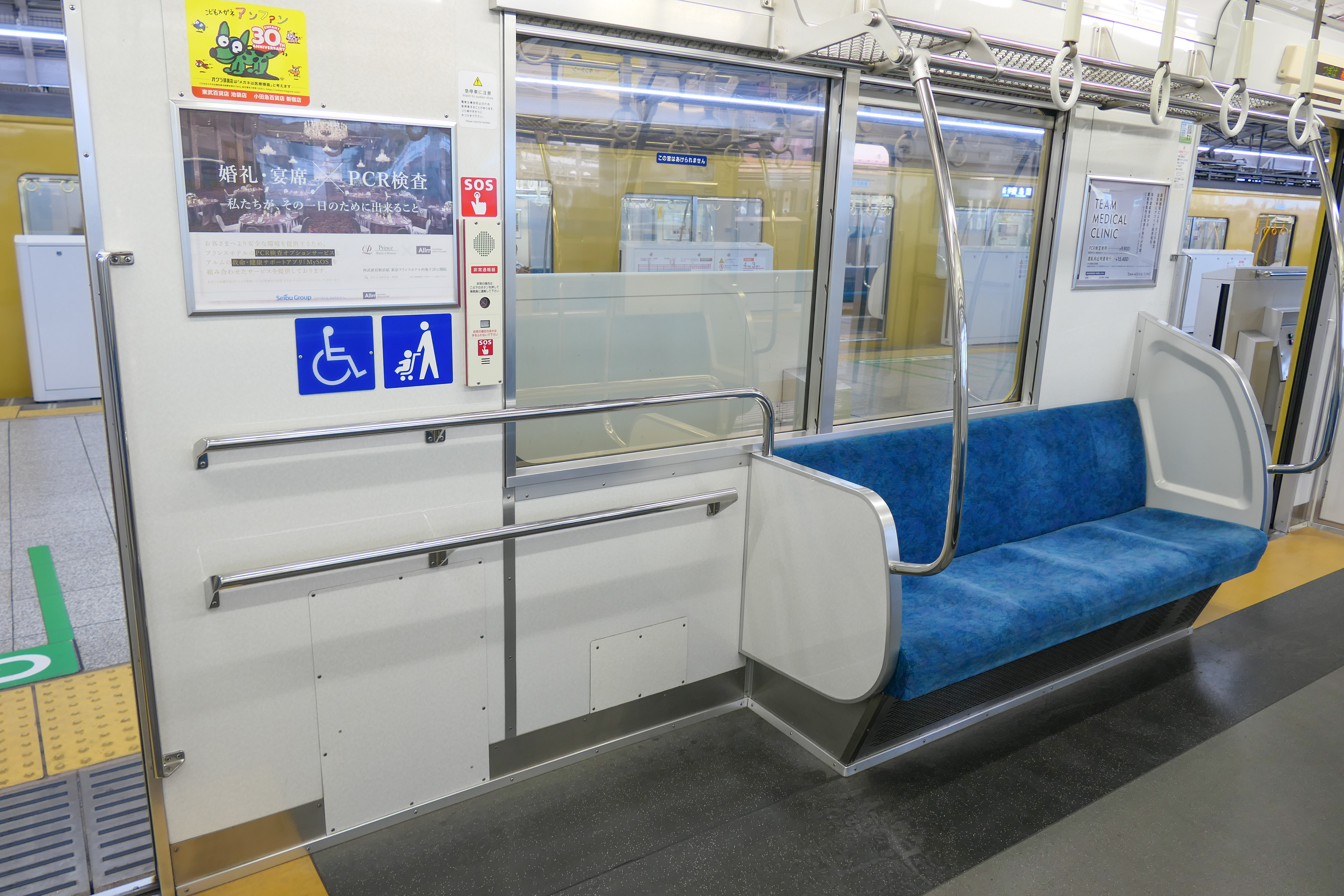
Newly established wheelchair space

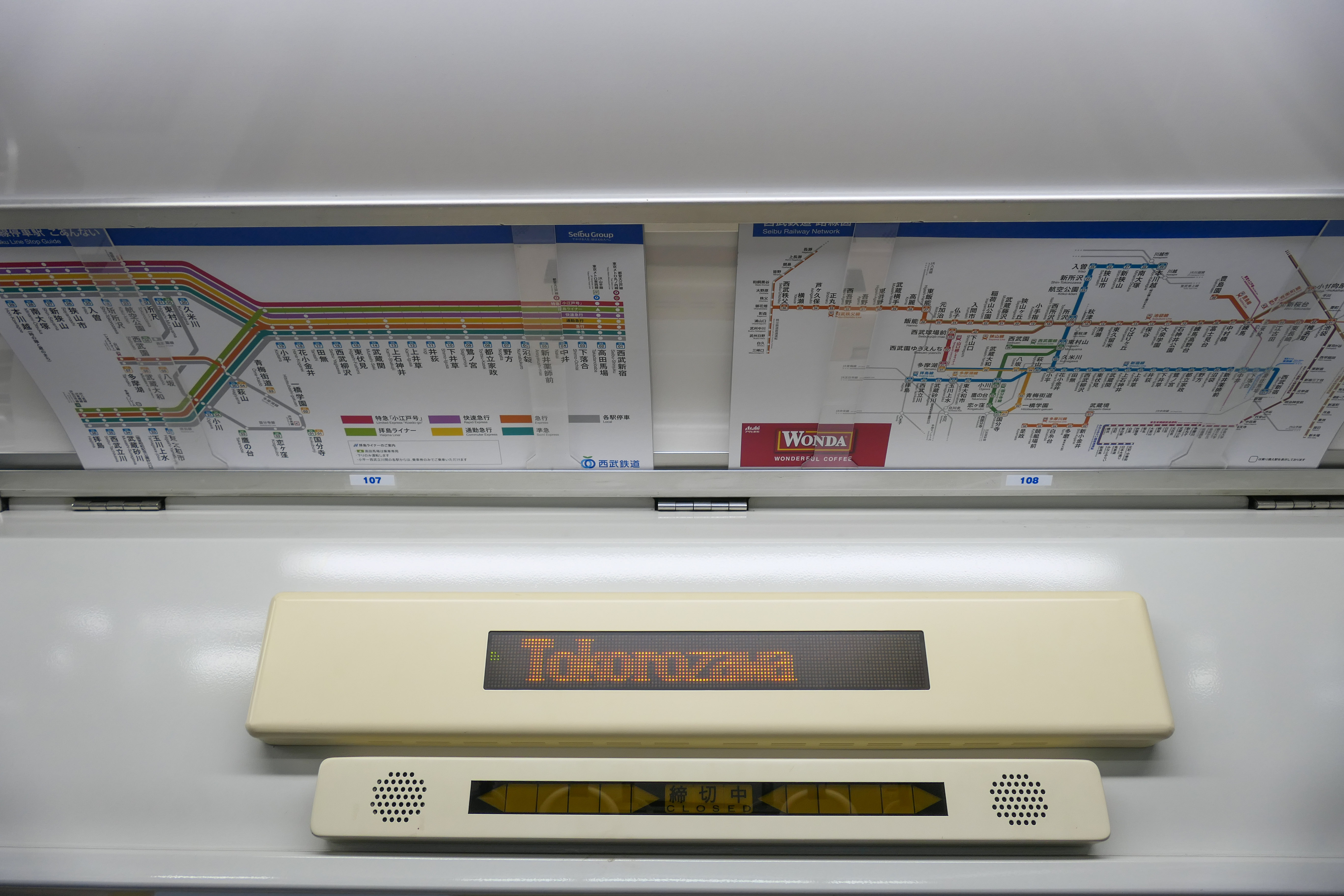
LED passenger information display

== Formations ==
Sets are formed as two-car, four-car, six-car, and eight-car sets, as shown below.

=== Two-car sets ===
Designation	Mc	Tc
Numbering	24xx	

The "Mc" cars each have two pantographs.

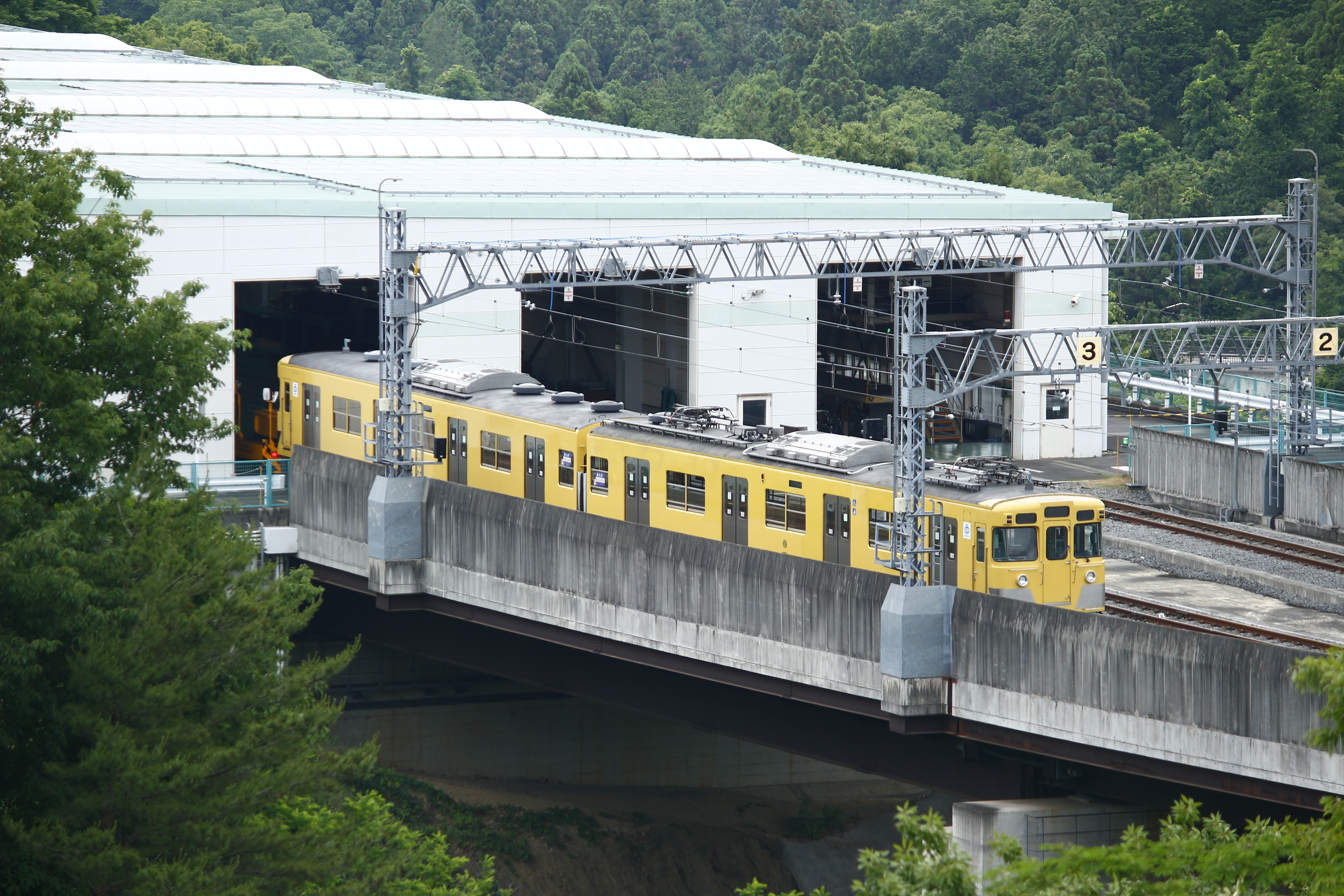
A two-car set

=== Four-car sets ===
Designation	Mc	M2	M3	Tc2
Numbering	25xx		26xx	

The "M3" cars each have two lozenge-type pantographs.

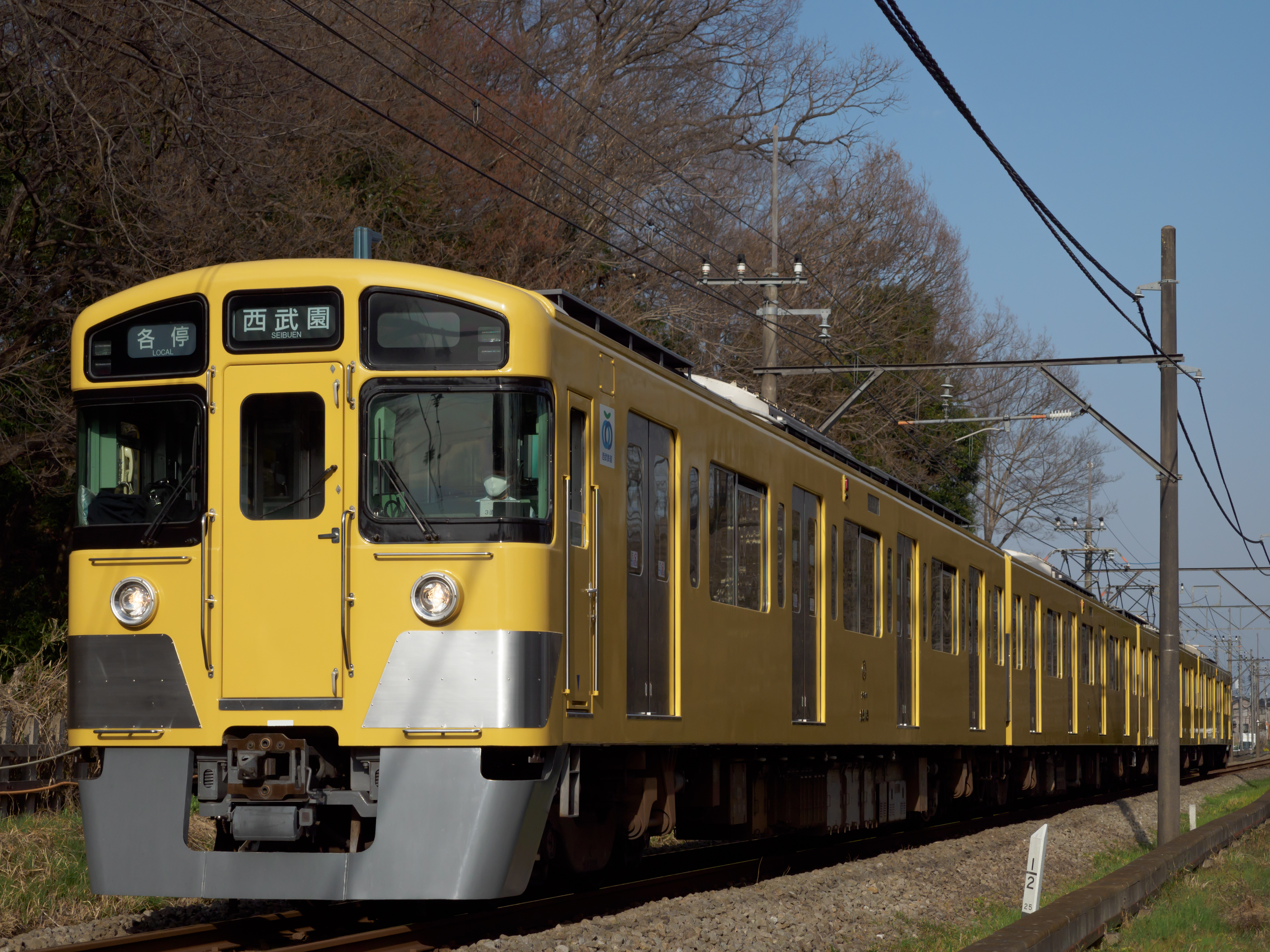
A four-car set

=== Six-car sets ===
Designation	Tc1	M1	M2	M5	M6	Tc2
Numbering	20xx	21xx		22xx		20xx

The "M1" and "M5" cars each have two single-arm pantographs.

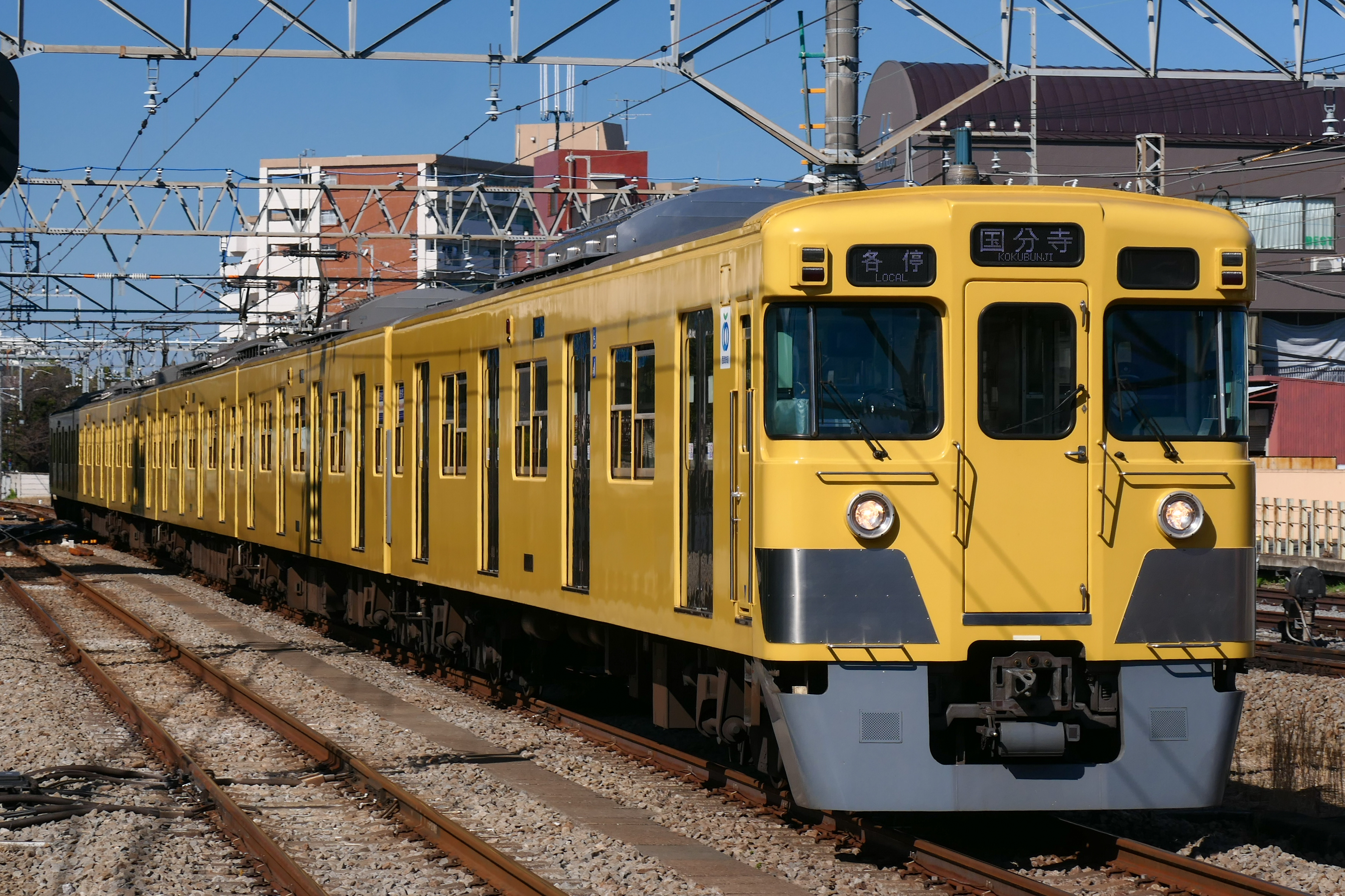
A 2000 series six-car set

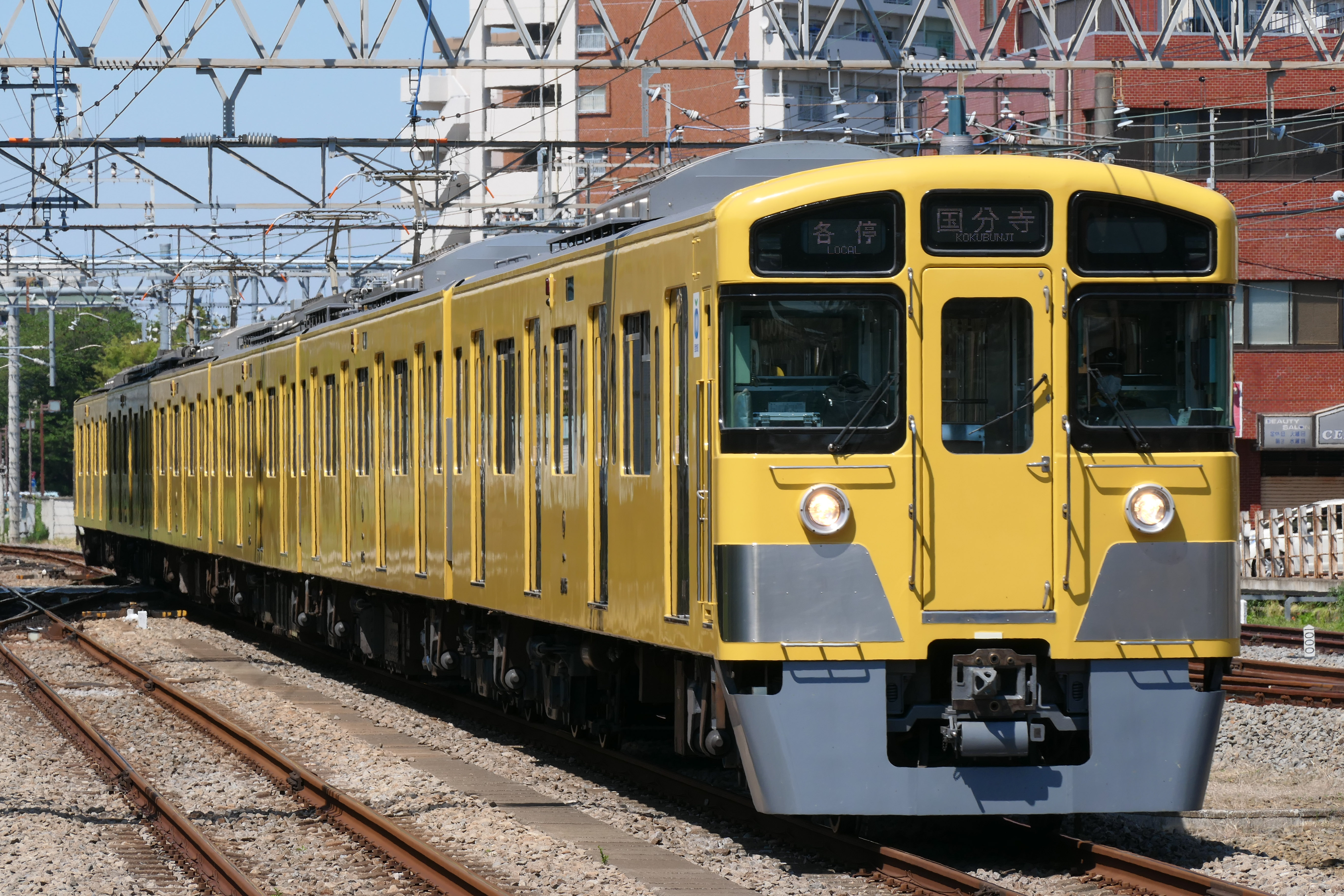
A New 2000 series six-car set

=== Eight-car sets ===
Designation	Tc1	M1	M2	M3	M4	M5	M6	Tc2
Numbering	20xx	21xx		22xx		23xx		20xx

The "M1", "M3", and "M5" cars each have one pantograph.

※Sets 2001 to 2007 are:

Designation	Tc1	M1	M2	M3	M4	M5	M6	Tc2
Numbering	20xx	21xx		23xx		22xx		20xx

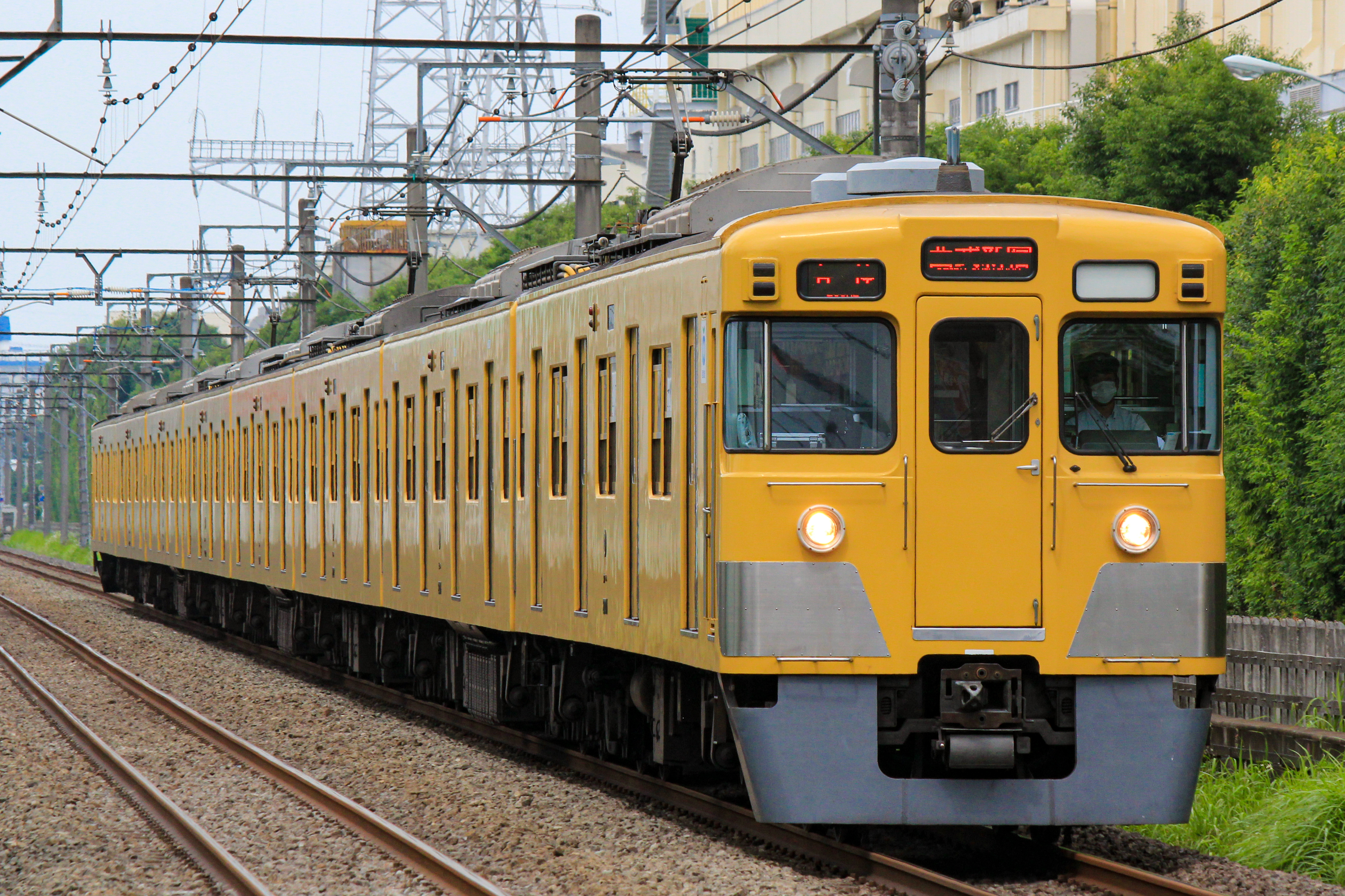
A 2000 series eight-car set. This set first consisted of six cars. Two intermediate cars were added.

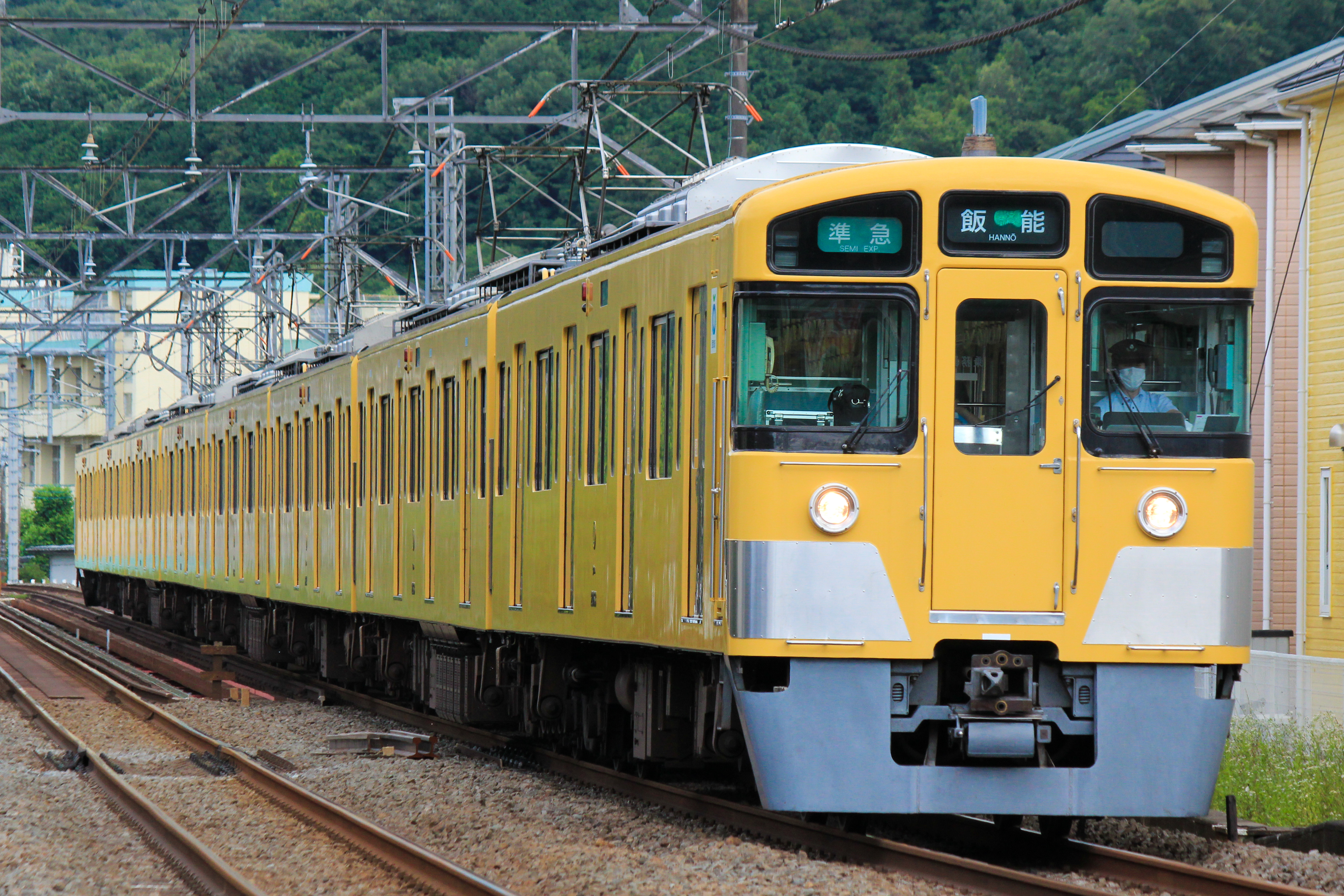
A new 2000 series eight-car set

== Special wrappings ==
=== KORO-TRAIN ===
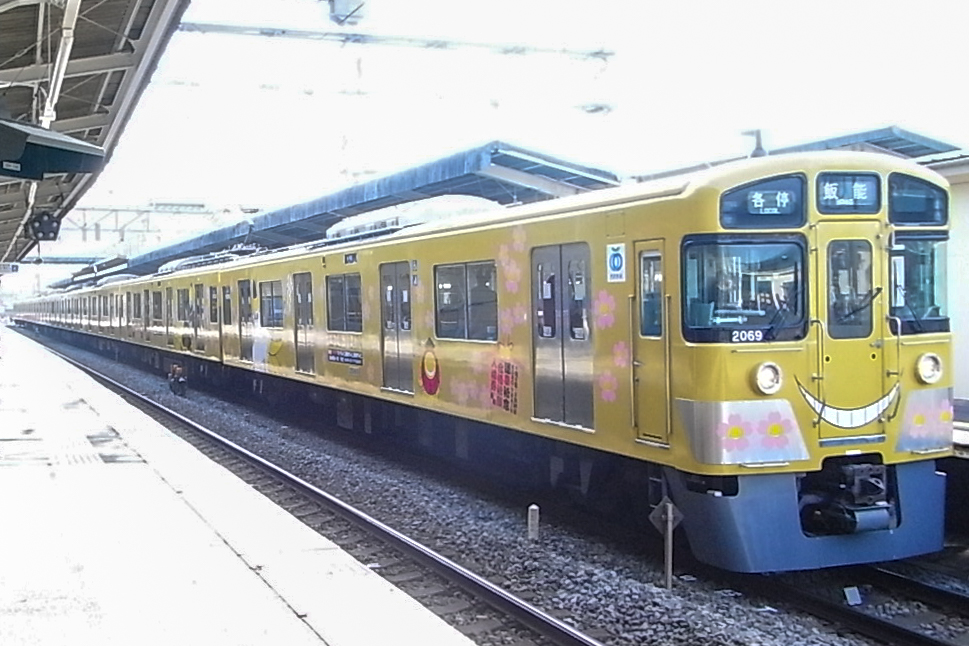
Set 2069 with "KORO-TRAIN" wrapping in January 2016

From 6 April 2015, set 2075 had a wrapping depicting the character Koro-sensei from Assassination Classroom. On June, the wrapping design was changed. The wrapping was removed in late June.

From 28 December 2015, a different wrapping also based on Assassination Classroom was put on set 2069. The wrapping was removed in late February 2016.

=== "Seibu Railway x Taiwan Railway Administration Agreement Commemorative Train" ("Seibu Railway x LAIMO" wrapping train) ===
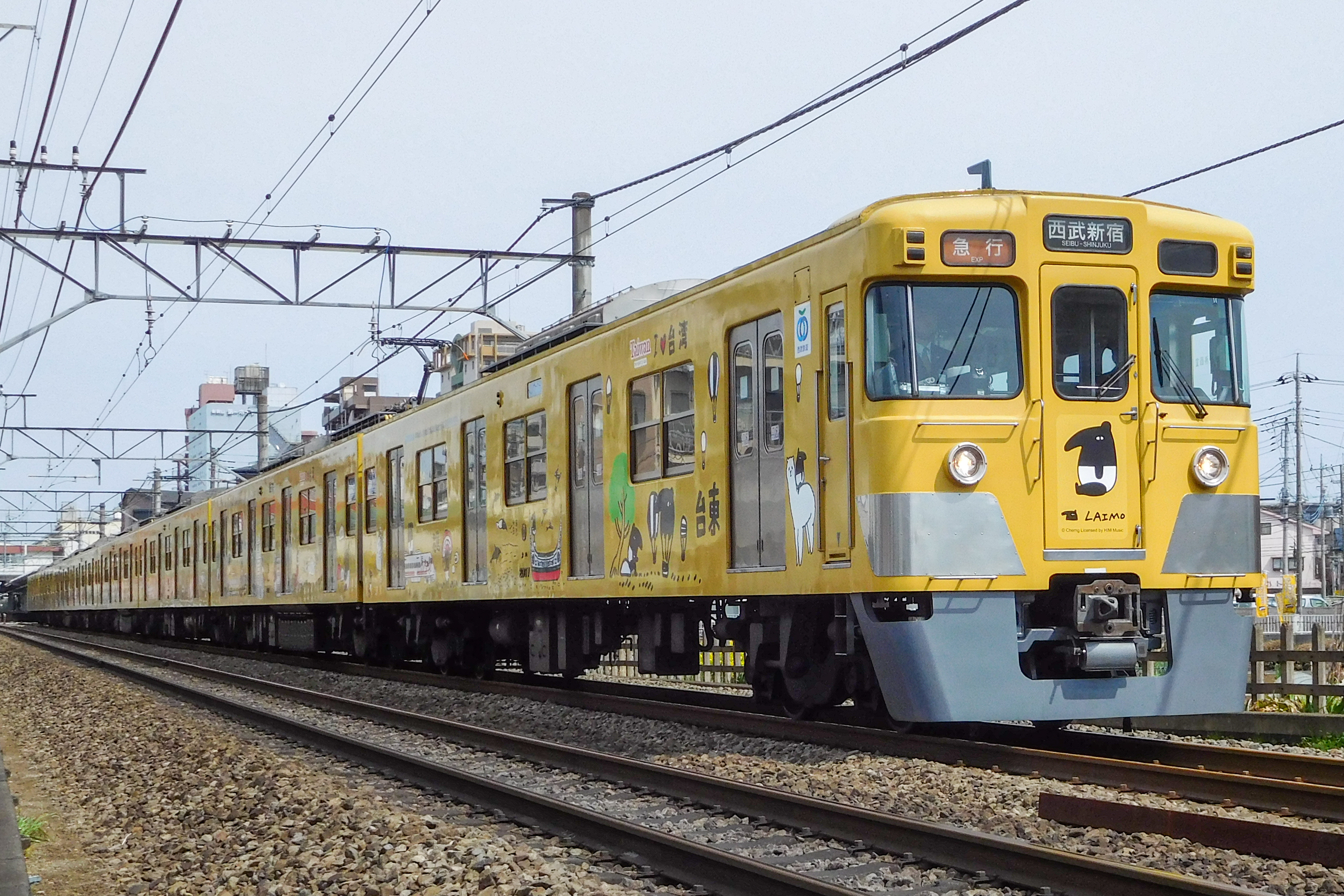
Set 2007 with "Seibu Railway x Taiwan Railway Administration Agreement Commemorative Train" wrapping in March 2017

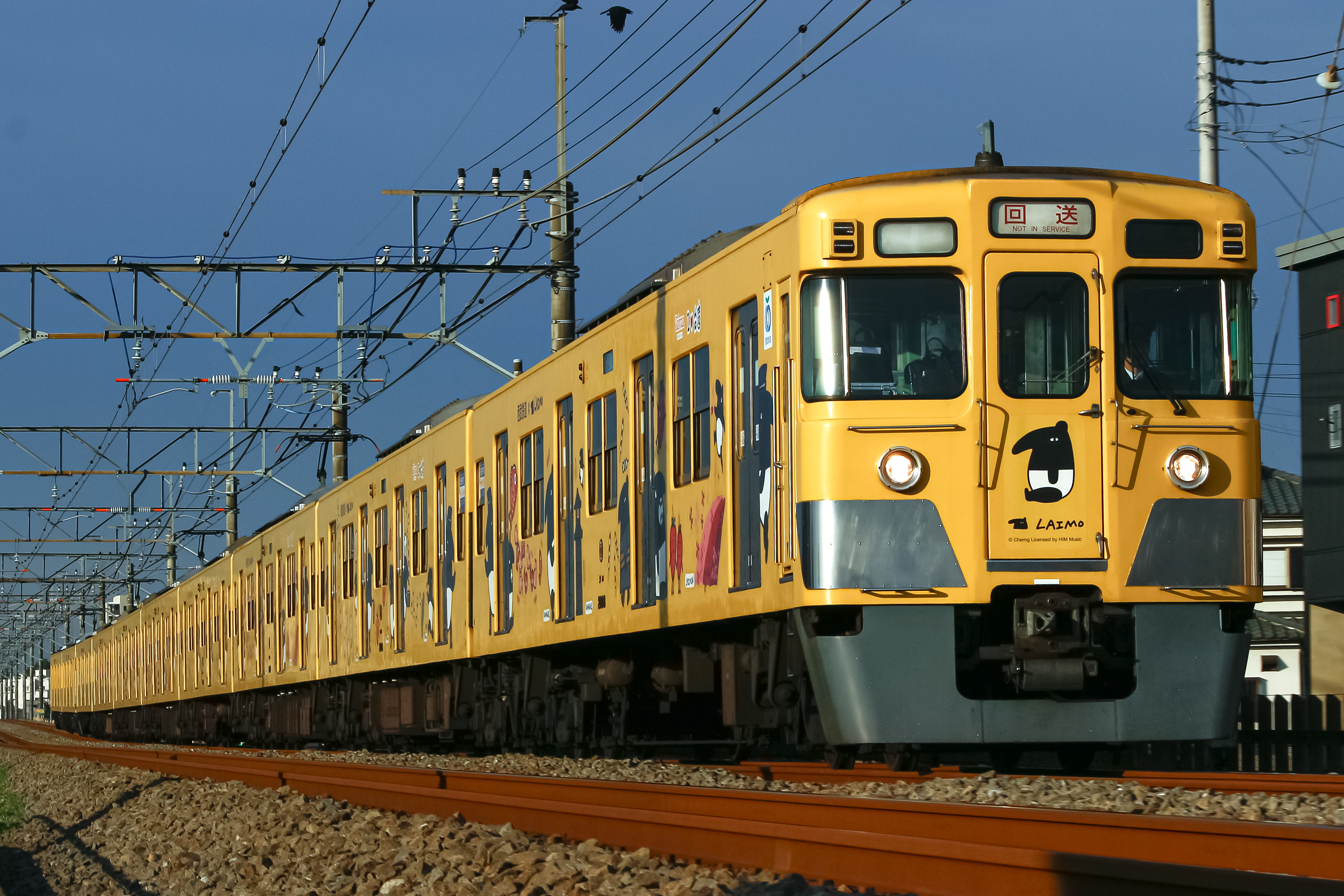
Sets 2405 and 2007 with "Seibu Railway x LAIMO" wrapping in March 2019

From 18 March 2017, set 2007 had a wrapping depicting Japan and Taiwan's tourist spots. From 26 February 2018, the design was renewed, and it started running as "Seibu Railway x LAIMO" wrapping train second edition. Originally, the train was supposed to have wrappings on it until December 2019, but its wrapping was removed in April 2019.

On 6000 series set 6158, there was also a similar wrapping, but this train's wrapping period was extended, and it had wrappings until late February 2021.

=== Seibu Railway 110th Anniversary Train ===
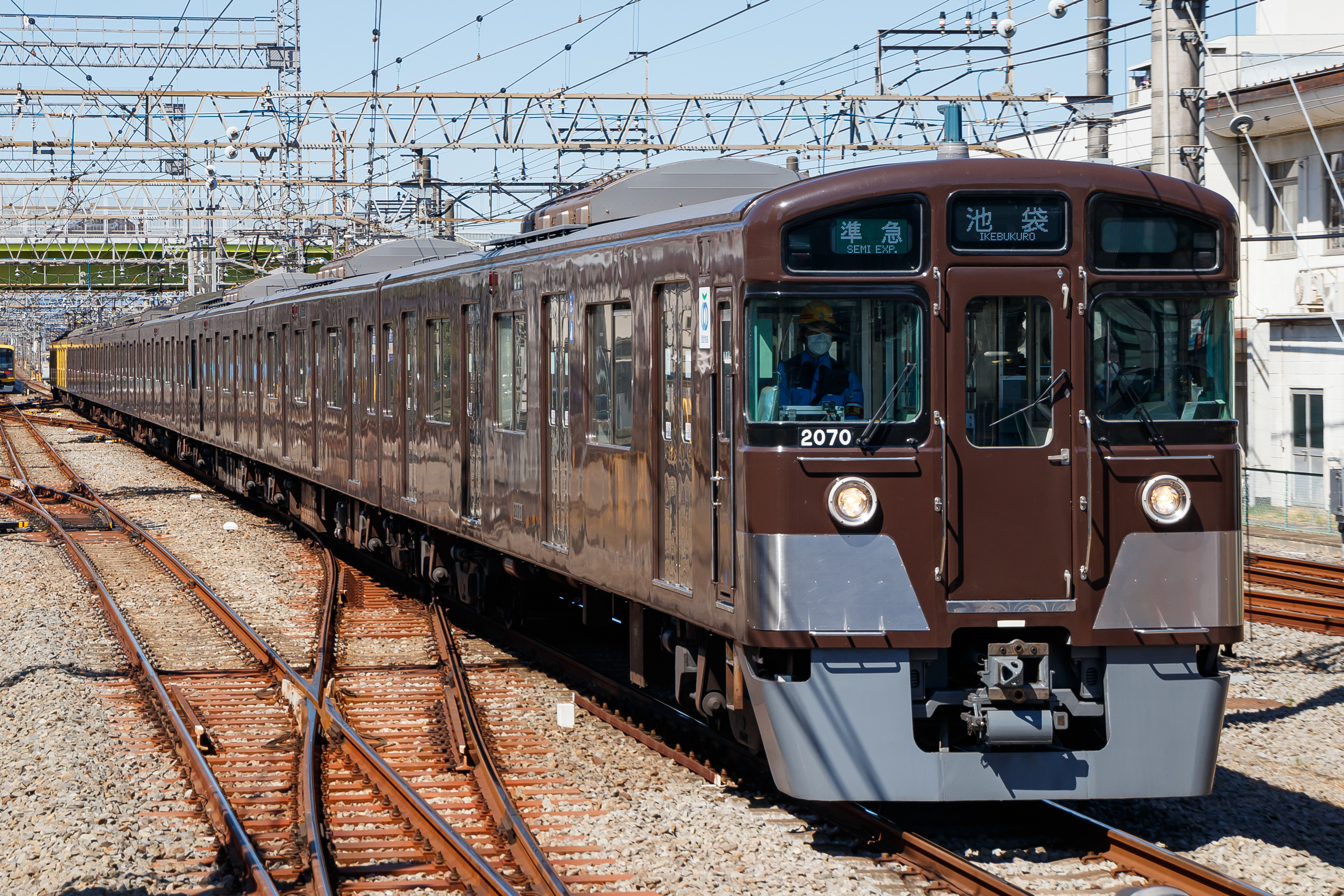
Sets 2463 and 2069 with "Seibu Railway 110th Anniversary" wrapping in March 2023

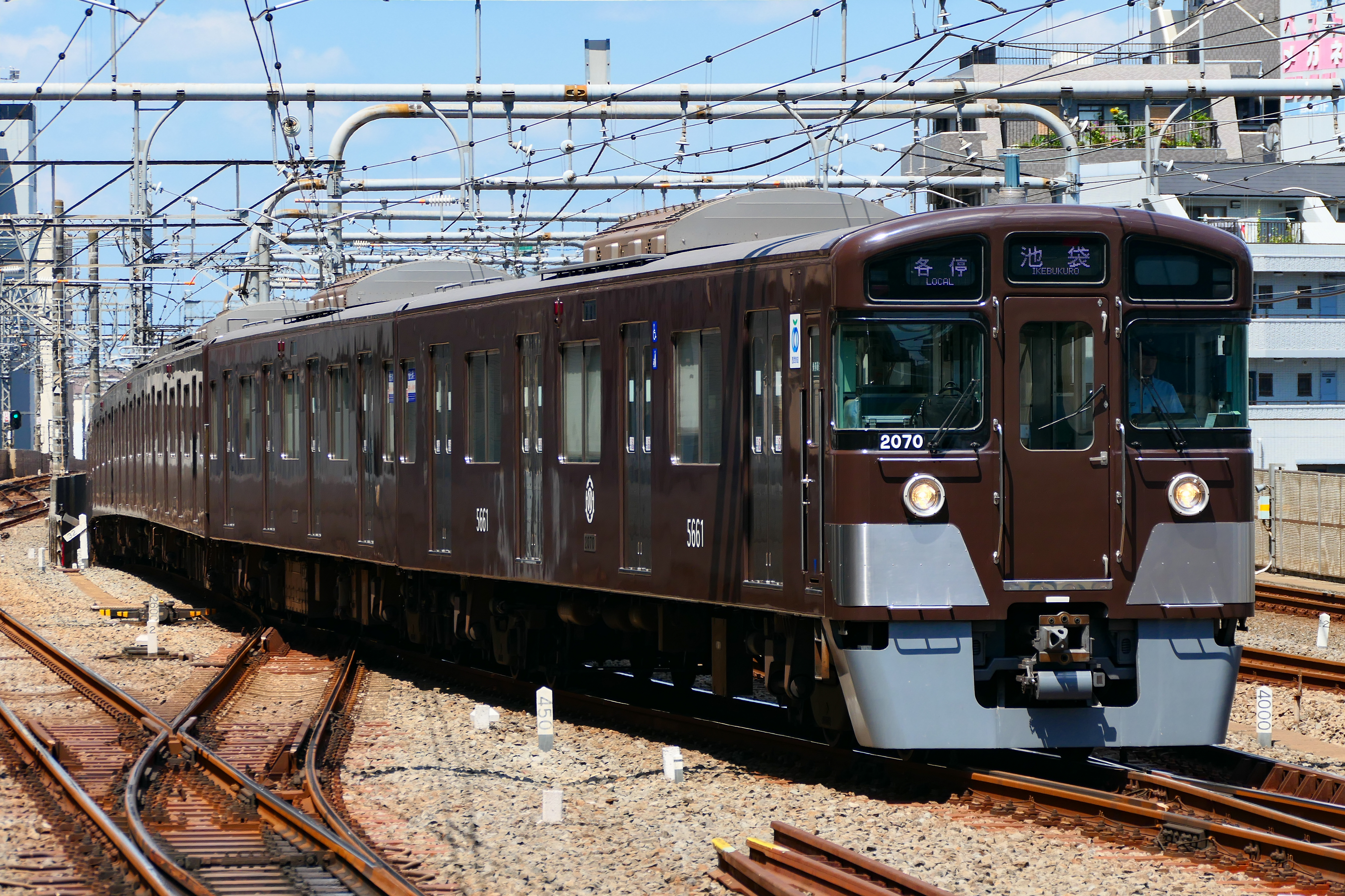
Set 2069 with "Seibu Railway 110th Anniversary" wrapping in July 2023

From 24 January 2023, set 2069's color was changed and it was run as "Seibu Railway 110th Anniversary Train". It commemorates the 110th anniversary of Seibu Railway's founding, and it is painted imitating the "Deha 5560 type", a vehicle representing Musashino Railway, the predecessor of the Seibu railway. At the end of March, the Musashino railway coat of arms and car name imitation mark of the Musashino Railway era were affixed to the sides of both leading cars.

== Withdrawal ==
In this section, to prevent confusion, "old 2000 series" is used to classify 2000 series, and "new 2000 series" will be to classify new 2000 series, and "2000 series" is used for both 2000 series and new 2000 series.

=== Withdrawals due to accident damage ===
Because of the Tanashi accident that happened in 1986, sets 2017, 2023, 2407 and 2415 were damaged, and cars 2017, 2117, 2118, 2217, 2227, 2024, 2415 and 2416 (8 cars in total) were withdrawn. Set 2017 and 2023 had 6 undamaged cars in total, and by changing cars 2218 to 2224 as well as cars 2018 to 2024, set 2023 was made.

=== Withdrawals due to deterioration over time ===
==== 2015 fiscal year ====
Sets 2023, 2009, 2013, 2029 and 2025 (30 cars in total) were withdrawn.

==== 2016 fiscal year ====
Sets 2097, 2011, 2005, 2015 and 2019 (34 cars in total) were withdrawn.

Set 2097 was the first new 2000 series and the first eight-car train set to be withdrawn.

==== 2018 fiscal year ====
Set 2021 (6 cars in total)

==== 2021 fiscal year ====
Sets 2003, 2407, 2001, 2411, 2063, 2401, 2519 and 2521 (38 cars in total) were withdrawn.

Set 2407 was the first two-car train set to be withdrawn.

Set 2063 was the second new 2000 series to be withdrawn, and from this point, the withdrawal of new 2000 series had become full-fledged.

==== 2022 fiscal year ====
Sets 2007, 2059, 2503, 2413, 2501, 2033, 2027, 2405, 2505, 2057, 2061, 2515, 2403 and 2511 (70 cars in total) were withdrawn. As part of Seibu group's plan to overcome the COVID-19, an abnormal amount of train sets were withdrawn.

As set 2007 was the old 2000 series' last eight-car train set, and from 29 March, set 2007 had some headmarks and special stickers on the train, and also had 2 tour runs before withdrawal, including a last-run tour.

Train set 2033 was 2000 series' first renewed train set to be withdrawn. Because of the withdrawal of train set 2027, there are no more 3-color-LED trains in the 2000 series; and only one 3-color-LED trainset in Seibu railways' fleet remains. (Note: Train set 10112 of Seibu 10000 series.) Since train set 2403 was withdrawn, trains using roller-blind displays in the old 2000 series was gone.

==== 2023 fiscal year ====
In October, set 2031 was withdrawn. As set 2031 was old 2000 series' last six-car train set, 3 events were held, including a last-run tour as with train set 2007 on 5 October. With that, only three two-car sets (six cars in total) remain in the old 2000 series fleet.

== Preserved examples ==
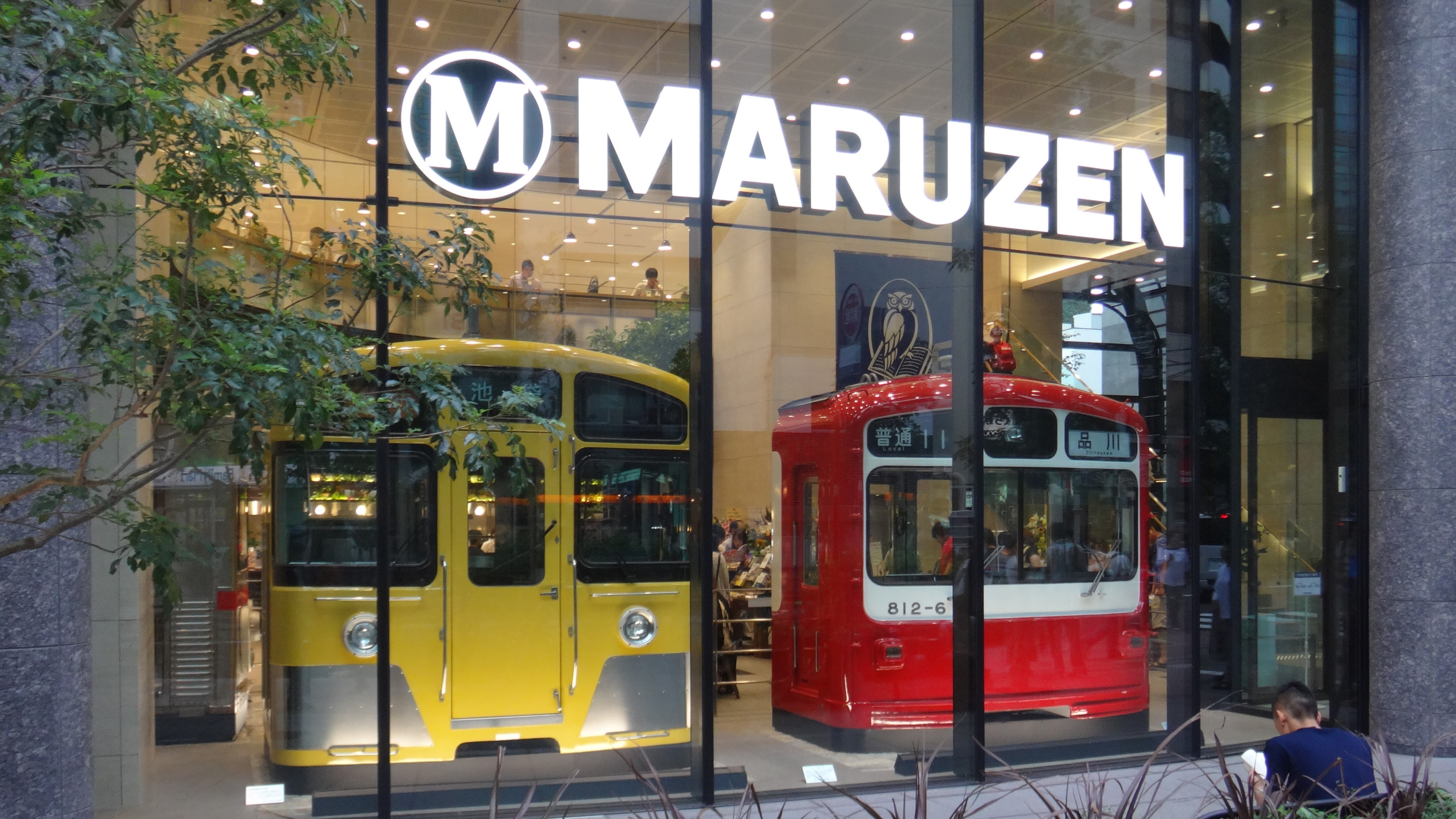
The cab end of car 2098 preserved inside the Maruzen bookshop in Tokyo, in August 2017. The cab next to it is a former Keikyu 800 series.

The cab end of former car Tc 2098 is preserved inside the Maruzen Ikebukuro bookshop in Toshima, Tokyo. Built in June 1992 at Seibu Railway's Tokorozawa factory, it was withdrawn in September 2016, and moved to the ground floor of the Maruzen Ikebukuro bookshop building in March 2017, while still under construction.

== Bibliography ==
- Saito, Yoshihiro (October 2008), "西武鉄道 新2000系バリアフリー化工事", Railway Pictorial (in Japanese), vol. 810
- "西武鉄道ニュース". Railway Pictorial (in Japanese). Vol. 914. February 2016. ASIN B007QTSLNQ.
- "西武鉄道の世界—身近な鉄路の"本格派"雑学". トラベルムック (in Japanese). Kotsu Shimbunsha. 5 October 2015. ISBN 978-4330608150.
