= Keikyu 800 series =

Japanese train type

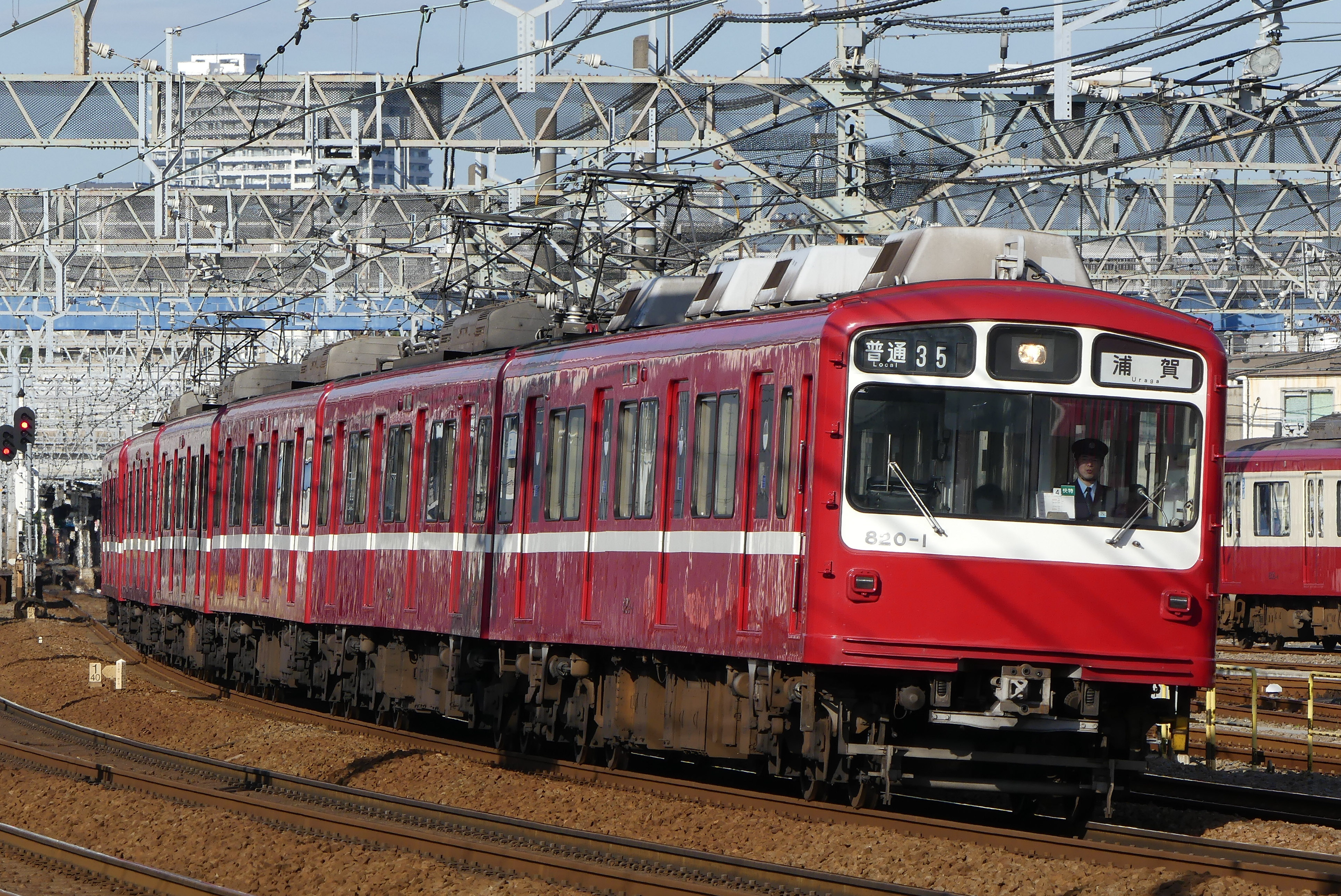
- Set 820 in November 2017
- In service: 1978–2019
- Manufacturer: Tokyu Car Corporation, Kawasaki Heavy Industries
- Entered service: 1978
- Refurbished: 1994–2001
- Scrapped: 2011–
- Number built: 132 vehicles
- Number in service: None
- Number scrapped: 60 vehicles
- Formation: 6 cars per trainset
- Operators: Keikyu
- Depots: Kanazawa, Shinmachi

Specifications
- Car body construction: Steel
- Car length: 18,500 mm (60 ft 8 in) (end cars); 17,860 mm (58 ft 7 in) (intermediate cars)
- Width: 2,798 mm (9 ft 2 in)
- Doors: 4 per side
- Maximum speed: 100 km/h (62 mph)
- Traction system: Field Chopper
- Acceleration: 3.5 km/(h⋅s) (2.2 mph/s)
- Electric system(s): 1,500 V DC overhead wire
- Current collector(s): Pantograph
- Track gauge: 1,435 mm (4 ft 8 1/2 in)

The Keikyu 800 series (京急800形) was an electric multiple unit (EMU) train type operated by the private railway operator Keikyu on commuter services in the Tokyo area of Japan from 1978 until 2019.

== Formations ==
=== 6-car sets ===
Initially delivered as three-car sets, as of 1 April 2016, the fleet consisted of 12 six-car sets, formed as follows, with all cars motored (M cars).

Car No.	1	2	3	4	5	6
Designation	M1c	M2	M3	M1	M2	M3c
Numbering	8xx-1	8xx-2	8xx-3	8xx-4	8xx-5	8xx-6

- The "xx" in the car numbers corresponded to the set number.
- The two "M2" cars are each fitted with two lozenge-type pantographs.

=== 3-car sets ===
All three-car sets were formed as follows.

Car No.	1	2	3
Designation	M1c	M2	M3c
Numbering	8xx-1	8xx-2	8xx-3

== Interior ==
Passenger accommodation consisted of longitudinal bench seating throughout.

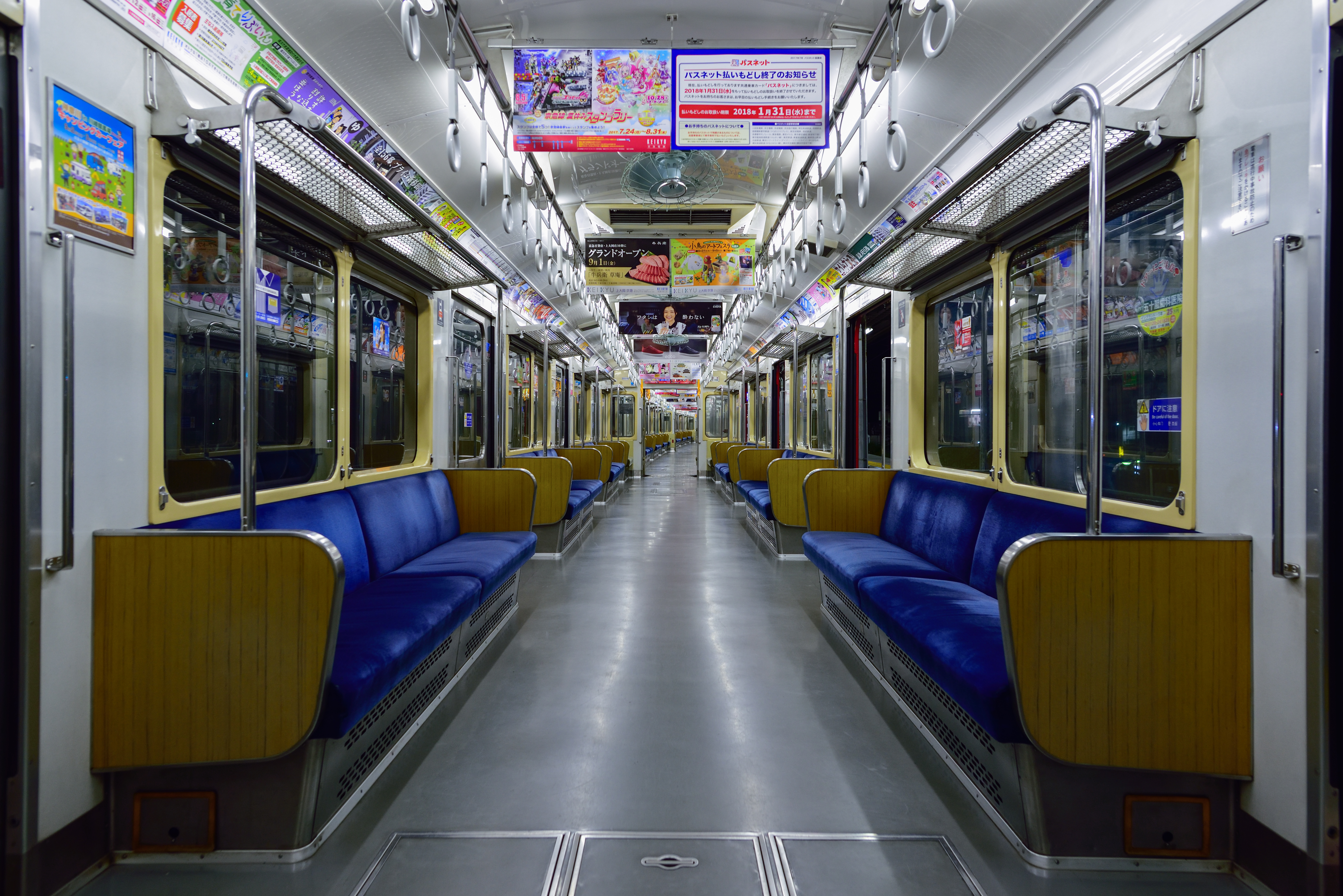
Interior view, August 2017

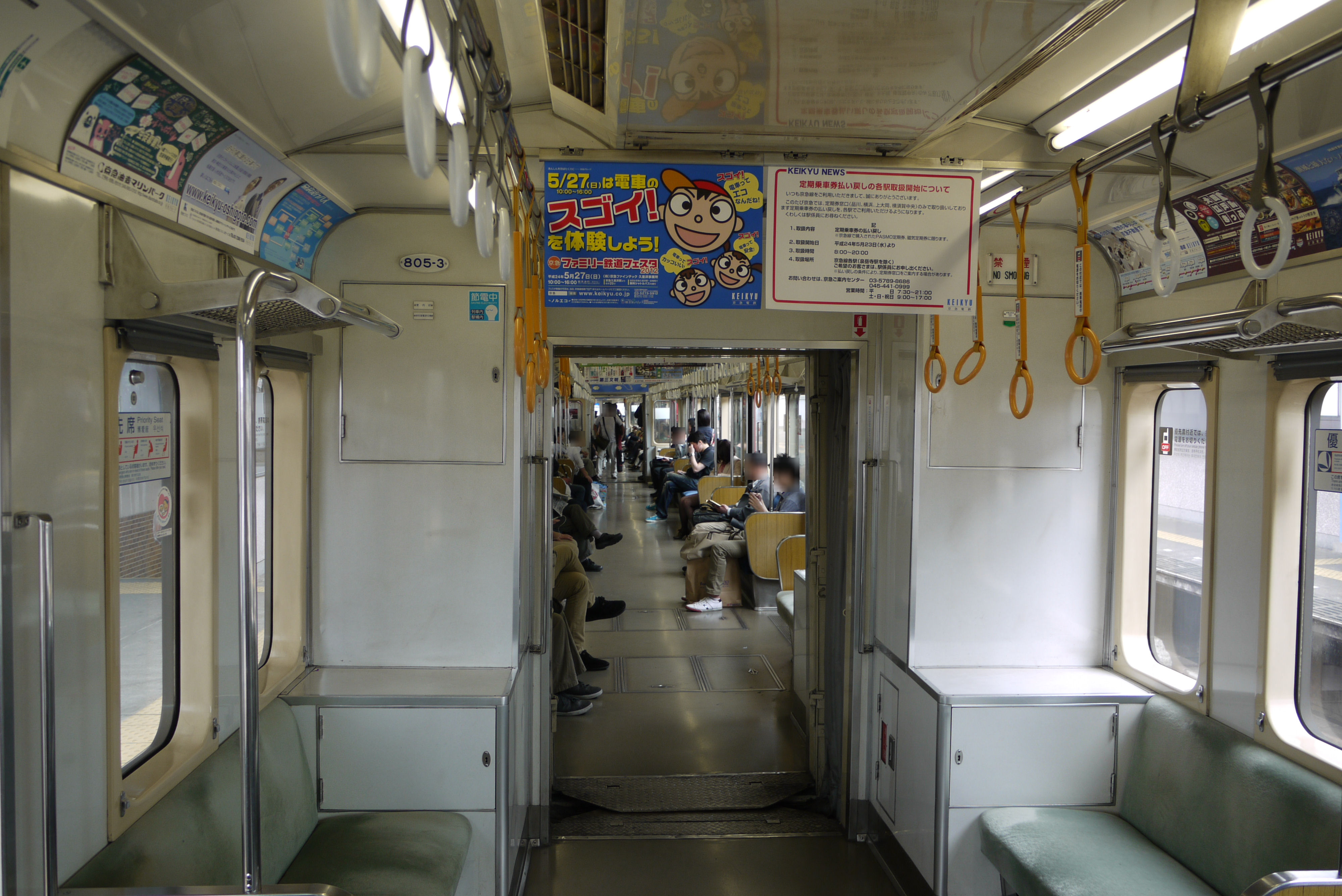
The gangway connection between former cab cars 805-3 and 806-1 in May 2012

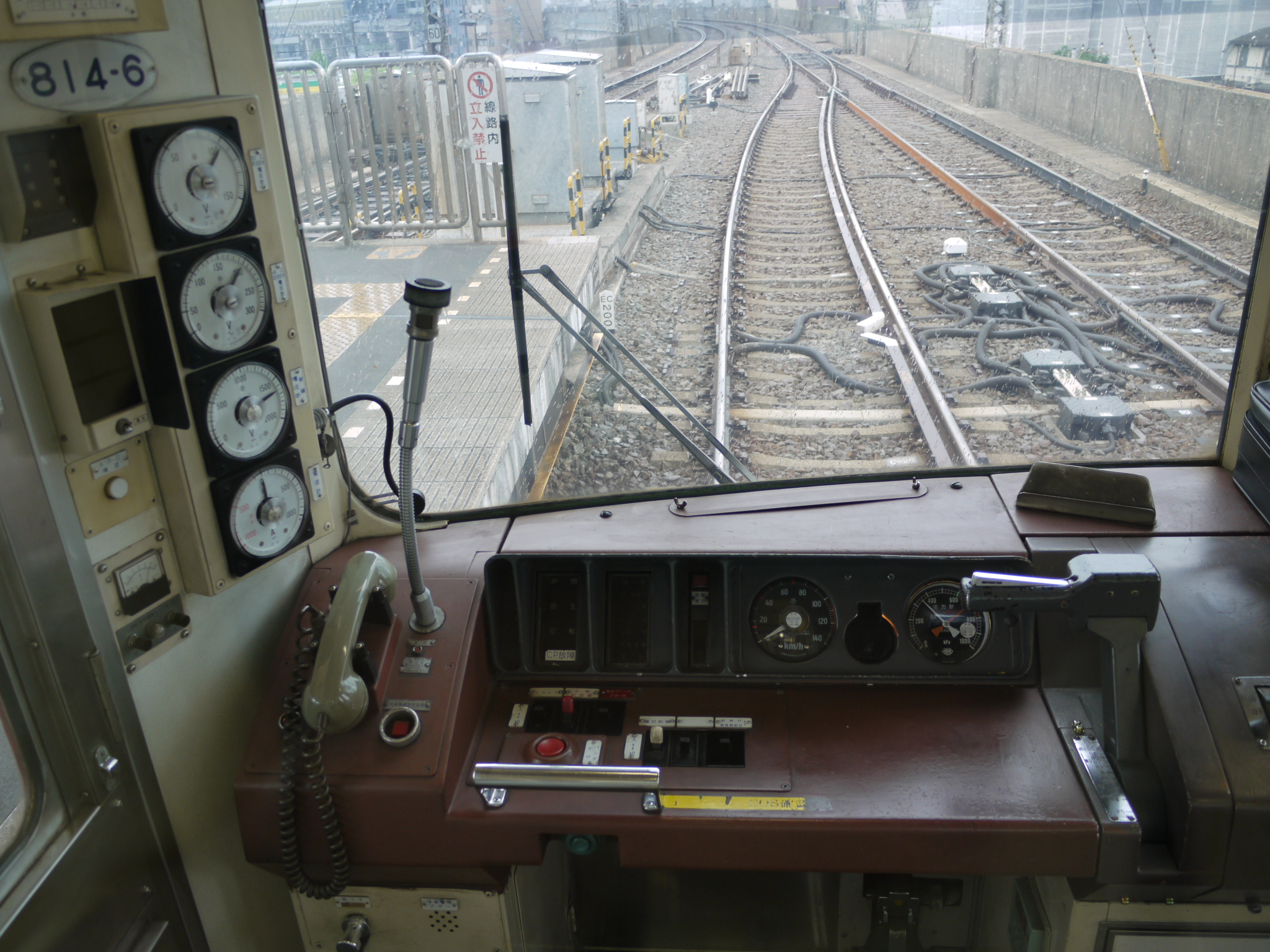
Driver's cab, May 2012

== Liveries ==
When delivered, the 800 series sets were painted in the standard Keikyu livery of vermillion red with white window surrounds, but were later repainted into all-over vermillion red with a white bodyside stripe following the introduction of the 2000 series trains.

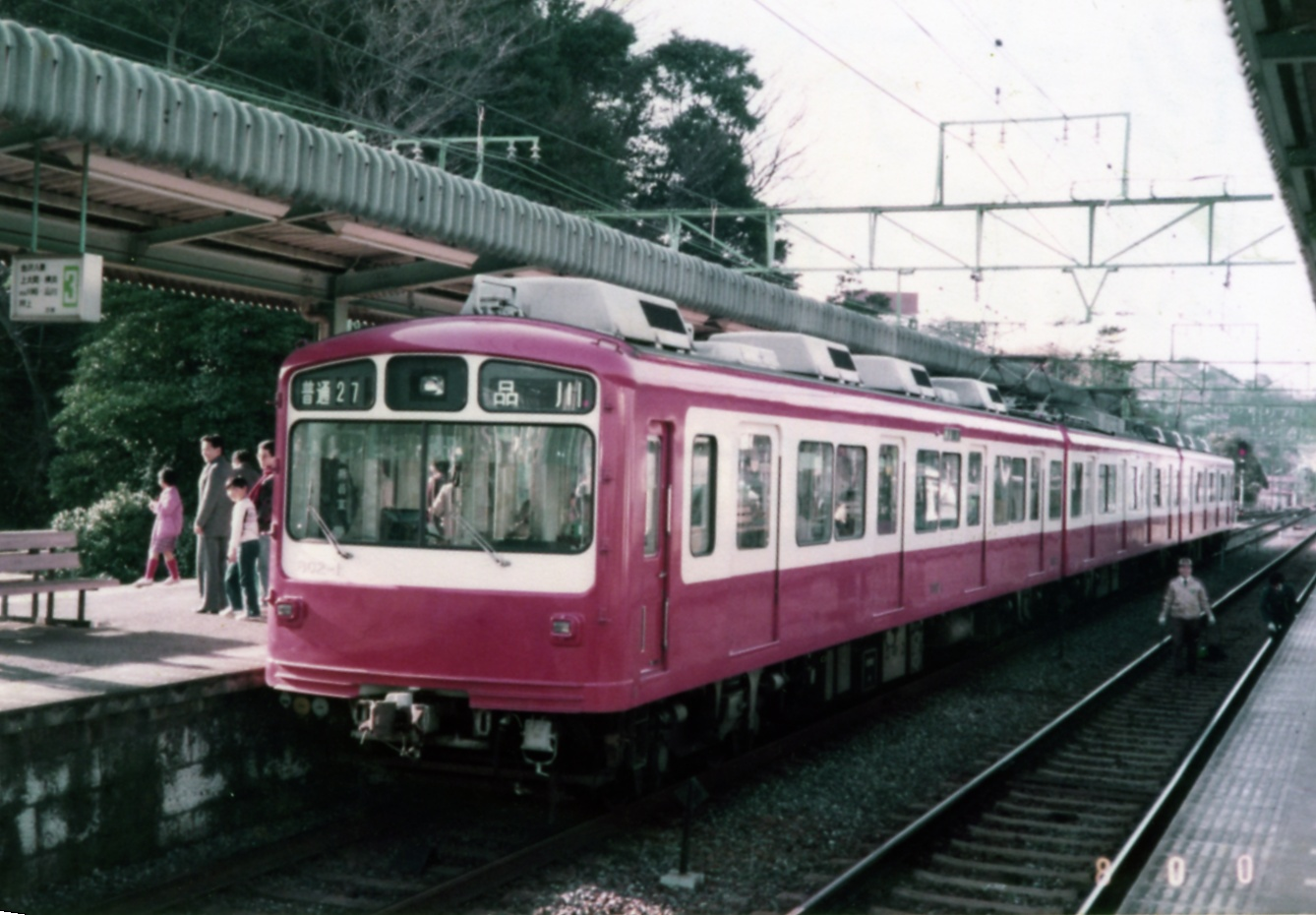
Three-car set 802 in original livery in January 1983

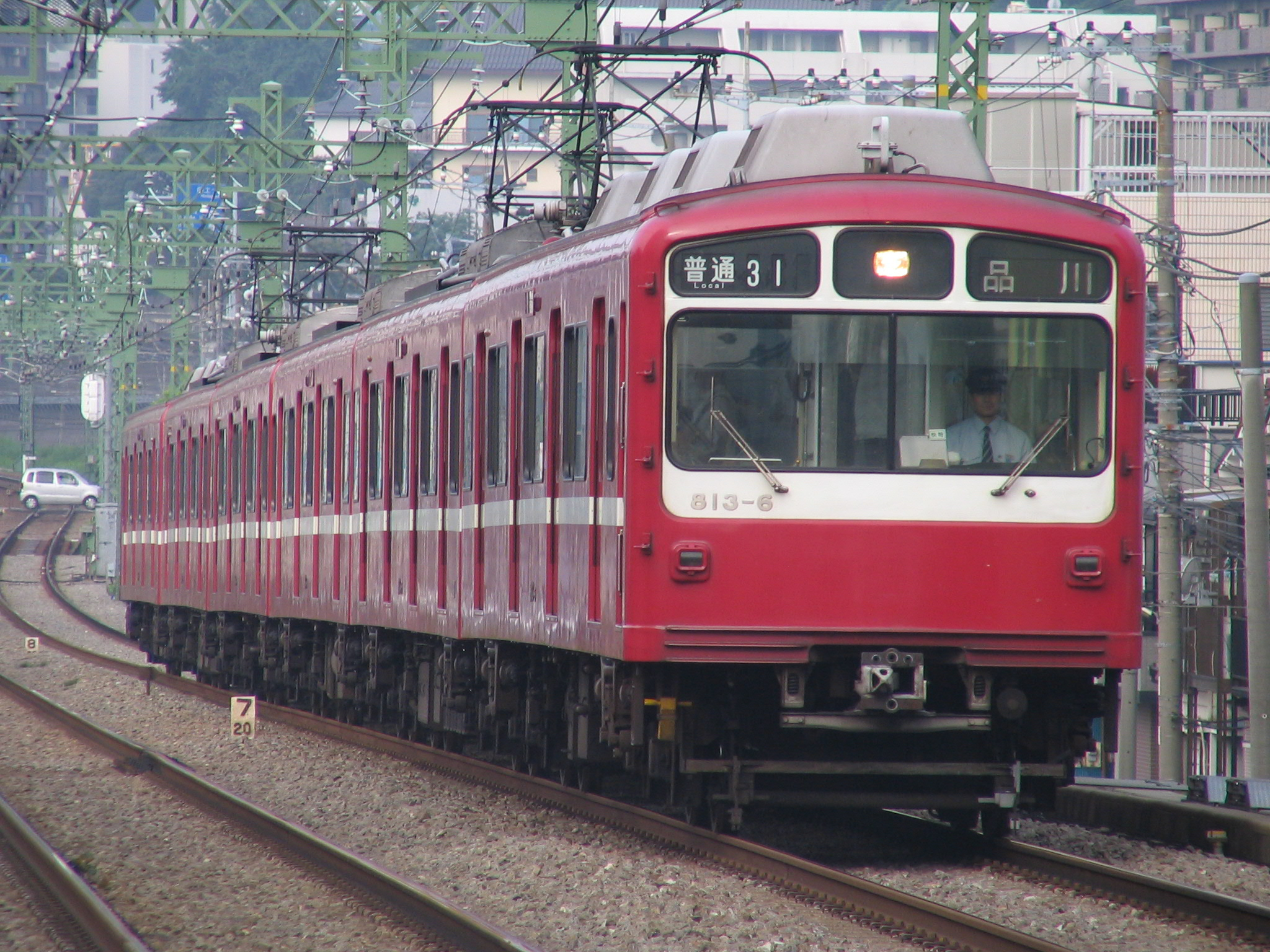
Six-car set 813 in later livery in July 2006

=== Revival livery ===
In November 2016, set 823 was repainted into the original-style livery with white window surrounds.

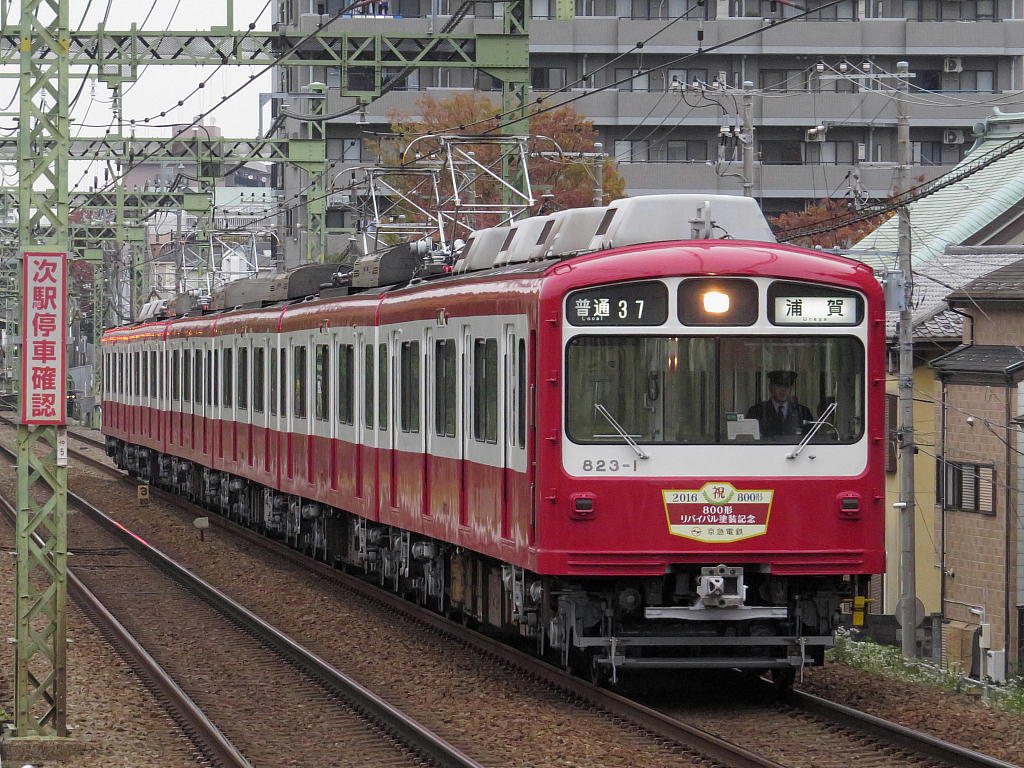
Reliveried set 823 in November 2016

== History ==
The 800 series won the 1979 Laurel Prize from the Japan Railfan Club.

The fleet underwent life-extension refurbishment between 1994 and 2001. This involved upgrading the train interiors and also forming six-car sets from the remaining three-car sets by removing the cab ends and adding gangway connections.

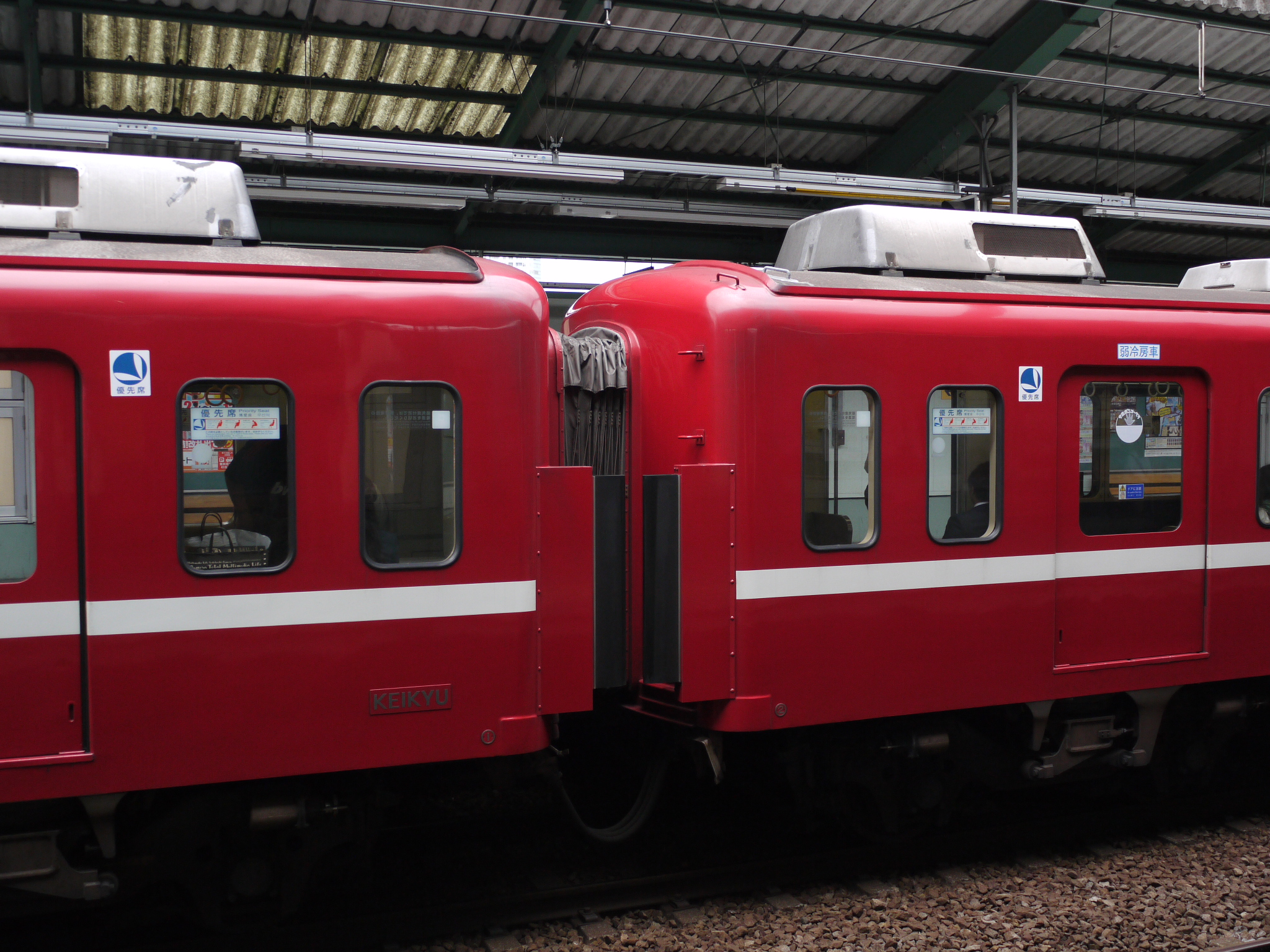
Former cab cars converted to become gangwayed intermediate cars

=== Withdrawal ===
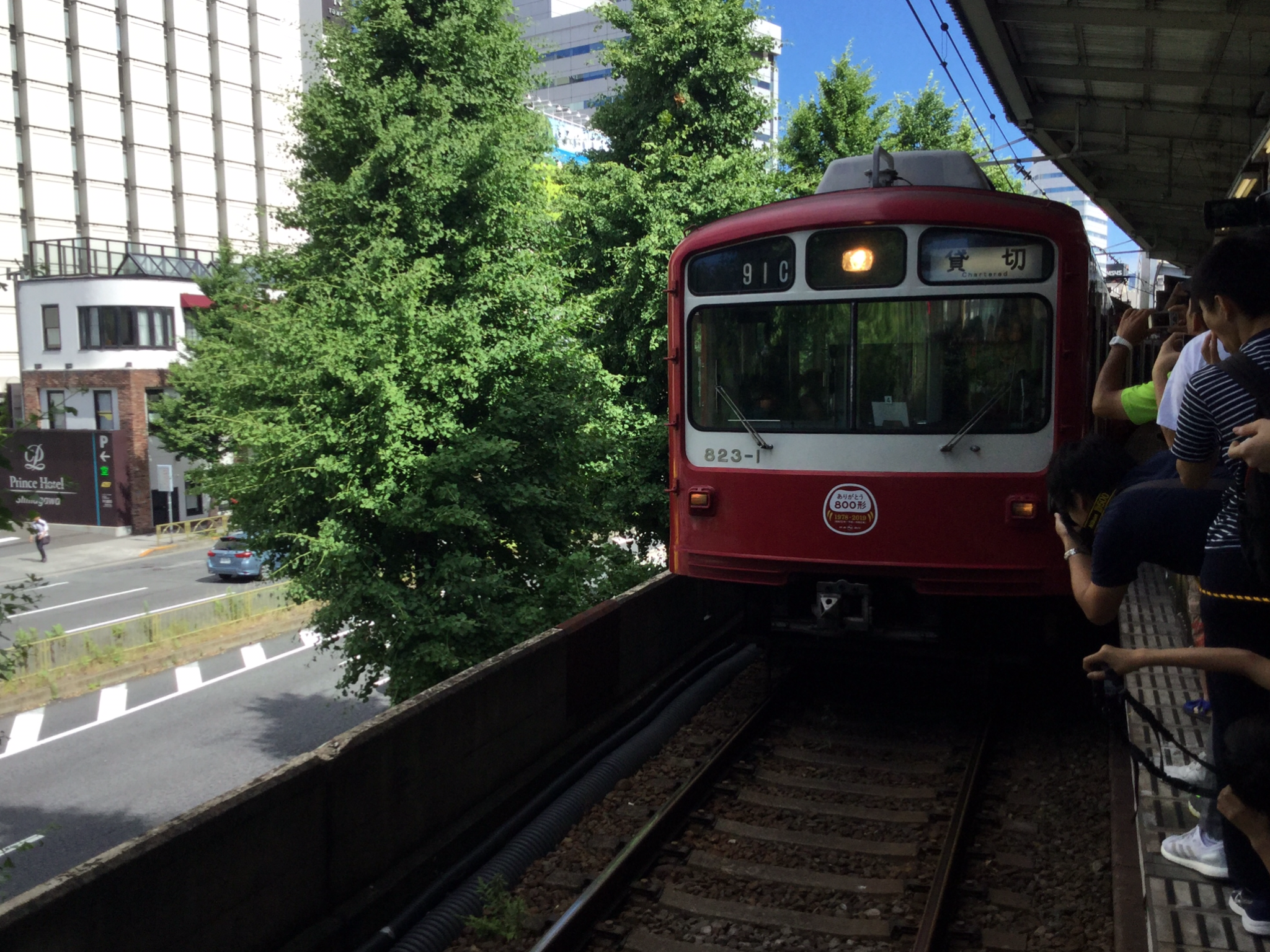
Set 823 on its last run at Shinagawa Station on 16 June 2019

Withdrawals commenced in 2011 following the introduction of new six-car N1000 series sets.

The last train, set 823, made its final run as a special charter on 16 June 2019.

== Preserved examples ==
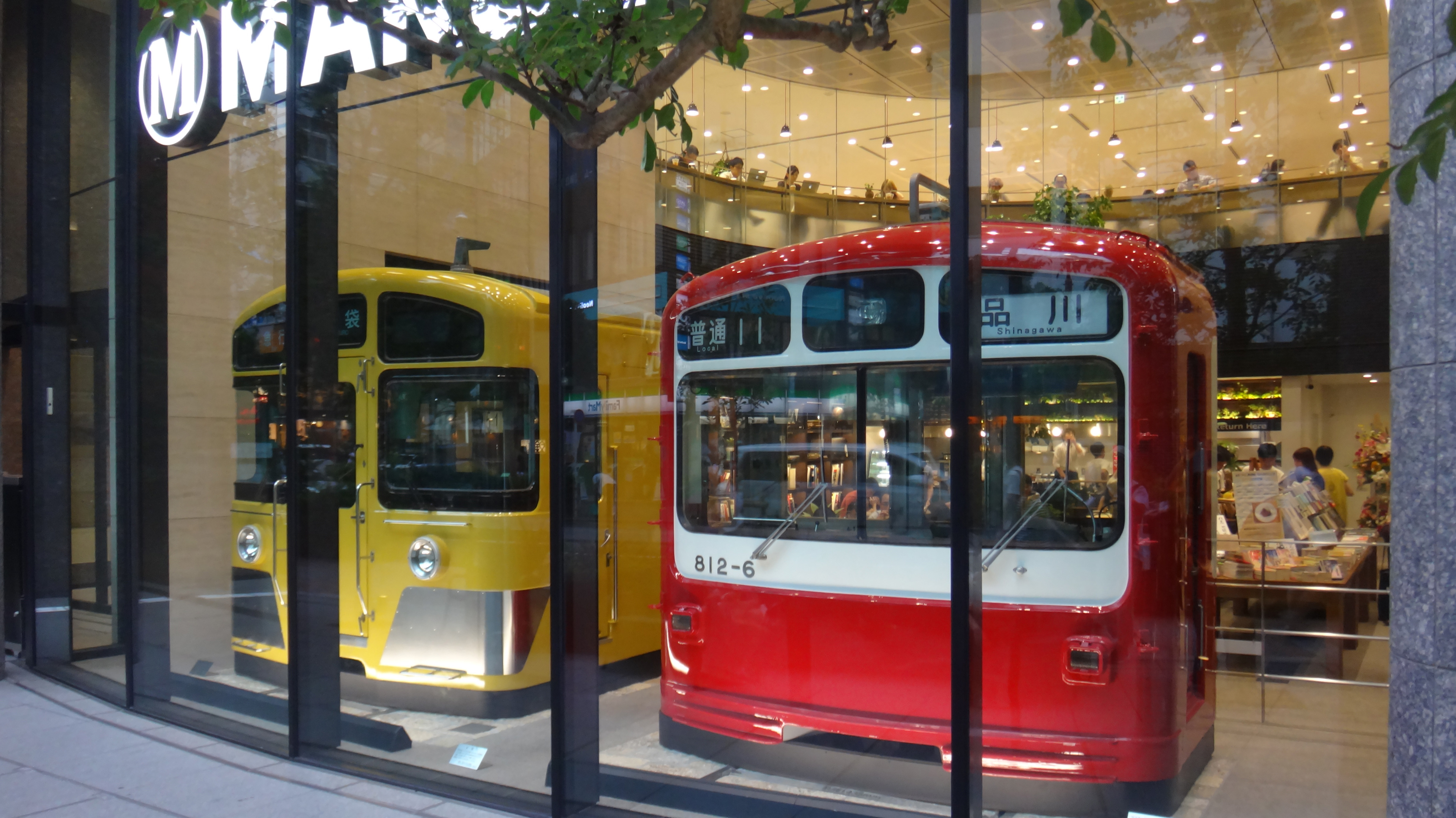
The cab end of car 812-6 preserved inside the Maruzen bookshop in Tokyo, in August 2017

The cab end of former car DeHa 812-6 is preserved inside the Maruzen Ikebukuro bookshop in Toshima, Tokyo. Built in November 1979 by Kawasaki Heavy Industries, and originally numbered 812-3, it was renumbered 812-6 in August 1986 following reforming as a six-car unit. It was withdrawn in December 2015, and moved to the ground floor of the Maruzen Ikebukuro bookshop building in March 2017, while still under construction.
