= Fumi Hirano =

Japanese actress (born 1955)

- 平野 文
- Born: Fumi Ogawa (小川 文) (Note: The name "Fumi" (文) is her real name. Her name was chosen by Takeo Miki, the 66th Prime Minister, who had a connection with the Hirano family dating back to the generation of her grandfather. According to Miki, "The kanji character 'Fumi' has a neat and sharp look to it, like a kimono tied with an obi sash.") (née Fumi Hirano (平野 文)); April 23, 1955 (age 71); Nishi-Ogikubo, Suginami, Tokyo, Japan
- Education: Tamagawa University
- Occupations: Actress; singer; voice actress; narrator; radio personality; essayist
- Years active: 1958–present
- Agent: Aoni Production
- Notable credit: Urusei Yatsura as Lum
- Spouse: 1
- Website: Official profile

Fumi Hirano (平野 文, Hirano Fumi; born April 23, 1955) is a Japanese actress, singer, voice actress, narrator, radio personality, and essayist.

She is most famously known worldwide for voicing the main female protagonist Lum in the 1981 television anime series Urusei Yatsura.

== Biography ==
She attended Tamagawa University in Machida, Tokyo, where she graduated with a degree in Theatre from the Department of Fine Arts in the College of Humanities. Hirano has been formerly affiliated with the Komadori Theater Company, Keizo Productions, the Tokyo Actor's Consumer's Cooperative Society, Horipro, and Accent. As of April 1, 2014, she has been affiliated with Aoni Production.

=== Early life ===
Hirano was born on April 23, 1955, in Nishi-Ogikubo, Suginami, Tokyo, Japan.

After having watched her cousin perform in ballet, she joined the Matsuyama Ballet Company and started lessons in ballet. Hirano's mother had also used to do ballet back in the day. Thanks to an instructor, she started appearing in musicals and children's television programs, and after being told, that she should study acting at a children's theater company, she joined one. At the time, the husband of Nobuyo Ōyama, Keisuke Sagawa, was popular as Taisō no Onīsan and Hirano mainly made appearances in musicals with Sagawa. She also appeared in magazine gravures and worked as a model for illustrator Jun'ichi Nakahara. Having learned piano and other things besides ballet since childhood, performing in recitals, and playing the piano accompaniment for school arts and crafts performances, she felt she had the shortcoming of an outgoing personality with a lack of shame.

In elementary school, she was often mistakened for a boy even when in red clothing. She would only ever play with boys, but was a victim of bullying.

=== Career ===
She began performing on stage at the age of 3. Introduced by her ballet instructor, she made her television drama debut at the age of 12 portraying Chikotan in the NHK children's drama series Detective Kacchin. Up until then, she wanted to be ballerina, but after making her appearance in a TV drama, she decided, "I'm going to be an actress."

In 1972, at the age of 17, her theater troupe approached and asked her, "There's a radio DJ audition, would you like to go?", leading her to start working as a disc jockey for NHK Radio's Wakai Kodama and three other programs. After she graduated from university, she became a disc jockey for Nippon Cultural Broadcasting's Hashire! Kayokyoku. She appeared in the puppet show Kaze no Ko Kane at around the same time.

On July 23, 1980, the fan club known as the "Fumi Family Club" was officially formed. A listener of her radio show "Yorozu Omedeta Corner" sent a postcard to Hirano, suggesting, "Why don't you try voice acting?".

She made her debut as a voice actress in the television anime Urusei Yatsura where she voiced the lead female protagonist Lum. The role of Lum made Hirano into a huge star, as the show became a long-running hit on television. She had prior dubbing experience from her days as a child actress.

=== Personal life ===
In 1989, Hirano entered an arranged marriage with Koichi Ogawa, who was then the third-generation owner of a wholesale business at Tsukiji fish market. The marriage was announced within Rumiko Takahashi's Ranma ½, which was being serialized at the time.

=== Current activity ===
In 2003, she voiced Kanna in Rumiko Takahashi Anthology and in 2015, voiced Sakura's mother in Rin-ne. She expressed joy of her natural growth from voicing a heroine to a mother, as well as happiness about returning to a Takahashi work.

== Filmography ==
=== Television animation ===
List of voice performances in television animation
Year	Title	Role	Notes	Source
1981–86	Urusei Yatsura	Lum	Debut anime voice role	
1981	Doraemon	Farmer's daughter		
1983	Mission Outer Space Srungle	Sexy, Dolly		
1983	The Pumpkin Wine	Kaori Sawada		
1983	Stop!! Hibari-kun!	Tsugumi Ōzora		
1983	Cat's Eye	Seira Nakamori	Ep. 24	
1984	Chikkun Takkun	Futsuko Nanda		
1984	Panzer World Galient	Hilmuka, Maid, Resident	Maid in Ep. 2, Resident in Ep. 20	
1984	Lupin the 3rd Part III	Lori	Ep. 15	
1985	Sangokushi	Sun Lihua	Television special	
1985	Pro Golfer Saru	Benihachi		
1985	Blue Comet SPT Layzner	Simone Reflann		
1986	Sangokushi II: Amakakeru Otokotachi	Sun Lihua	Television special	
1986	Ozu no Mahōtsukai	Queen of the Field Mice	Eps. 5, 24	
1987	City Hunter	Hanahime	Ep. 20	
1987	The Three Musketeers: The Animation	Milady		
1988	New Pro Golfer Saru	Benihachi		
1991	Little Ghosts, There, Here and Where	Narrator		
1991	Anime Himitsu no Hanazono	Camilla		
1992	Nontan to Issho	Narrator		
1995	Street Fighter II V	Dorothy	Ep. 2	
1998	Silent Möbius	Teres Vargie	Ep. 14	
2003	Rumiko Takahashi Anthology	Kanna		
2004	Mobile Suit Gundam SEED	Aisha	Special Edition	
2011	Is This a Zombie?	Delusion Yū	Ep. 13	
2011	Tamayura	Maon's mother	Eps. 4, 6, 11	
2012	Tsuritama	Kate		
2012	Chōyaku Hyakunin isshu: Uta Koi	Akazome Emon		
2013	Love Live! School Idol Project	Eli's grandmother	Ep. 8	
2013	Bakuman. 3	Takami Gōda	Ep. 23	
2013	DD Fist of the North Star	Doremi Mart Clerk	Ep. 3	
2013	Sazae-san	Female College Student, Mother, Tokuda, Kumiko Aramaki, Beautiful Woman, Radio DJ, Fortune-telling Princess		
2013	Infinite Stratos 2	Squall Meusel		
2013	Tokyo Ravens	Miyo Kurahashi		
2014	Z/X Ignition	Sera's mother	Ep. 7	
2014	Student Council Staff Members	Furuya	Ep. 9	
2014	Wasimo	Sister in Charge	Eps. 4, 6	
2014	Dragonar Academy	Mother Dragon		
2015	Rin-ne	Mrs. Mamiya (Sakura's mother)		
2015	DD Fist of the North Star II	Keiko	Ep. 12	
2016	Gate: Jieitai Kano Chi nite, Kaku Tatakaeri	Mimoza La Mer		
2016	Izetta: The Last Witch	Izetta's grandmother	Eps. 2, 4, 10	
2016	Great Passage	Female TV Personality	Ep. 4	
2017	Tales of Zestiria the X	Grimoire	Ep. 23	
2017	Ai-Mai-Mi: Surgical Friends	Narration		
2018	Great Detective Conan	Rumi Wakasa		
2018	One Piece	Mother Carmel		
2018	Kiratto Pri☆Chan	Martha Moegi		
2019	Chuck Shimezou	Shimezou's mom		
2019	Bermuda Triangle: Colorful Pastrale	Verata	Eps. 11-12	
2019	Star Twinkle PreCure	Kaka	Eps. 29-30, 49	
2020	Puzzle & Dragons	Tetsuko Kurogane, Metatron, the Apocryphal Judge		
2020	Lapis Re:Lights	Anna	Eps. 10-12	
2021	Redo of Healer	Star Spirit	Ep. 1	
2021	Let's Go! Anpanman	Caramel Mama, Black Rose Queen	Third voice of Caramel Mama, Second voice of Black Rose Queen	
2021	Kageki Shojo!!	Sarasa's Grandmother	Ep. 7	
2021	Blue Period	Masako Saeki		
2022	Platinum End	Muni		
2022	Pocket Monsters	Dracaena		
2022	Motto! Majime ni Fumajime Kaiketsu Zorori	Candina		
2022–24	Urusei Yatsura	Lum's mom		
2023	Apparently, Disillusioned Adventurers Will Save the World	Vilma		
2023	Fly Me to the Moon	Tokiko Tsukuyomi		
2023	Dark Gathering	Tōko Awamiya	Ep. 2	
2023	Paradox Live: The Animation	Landlady	Ep. 9	
2024	The Weakest Tamer Began a Journey to Pick Up Trash	Ruba		
2024	Dog Signal	Shikishima-san	Eps. 13, 20	
2024	Dahlia in Bloom: Crafting a Fresh Start with Magical Tools	Sofia	Ep. 1	
2024	The Café Terrace and Its Goddesses	Harue Yaeyama	Ep. 14	
2024	Bleach: Thousand-Year Blood War	Oyone	Ep. 29	
2024–25	Dandadan	Hana		
2025	I Got Married to the Girl I Hate Most in Class	Chiyo Sakuramori		
2025	Wind Breaker	Yui Ito	Ep. 19	
2025	I'm the Evil Lord of an Intergalactic Empire!	Grandmother	Ep. 12	
2025	Princession Orchestra	Hisana Shirube		
2026	Wash It All Away	Regular Customer (Old Woman)	Eps. 1, 3, 10, 12	
2026	Pardon the Intrusion, I'm Home!	Bunkai	Eps. 10-12	

=== Theatrical animation ===
List of voice performances in theatrical animation
Year	Title	Role	Notes	Source
1983	Urusei Yatsura: Only You	Lum		
1984	Urusei Yatsura 2: Beautiful Dreamer	Lum		
1985	Urusei Yatsura 3: Remember My Love	Lum		
1985	Lupin III: Legend of the Gold of Babylon	Caramel		
1986	Urusei Yatsura 4: Lum the Forever	Lum		
1986	Pro Golfer Saru: Challenge to the Super Golf World!!	Benibachi		
1986	Open the Door	La Midin Dimida		
1987	Pro Golfer Saru: Koga's Unexplored Region! Shadowy Ninja Golfer Appears!	Benibachi		
1988	Urusei Yatsura: The Final Chapter	Lum		
1989	The Three Musketeers: Aramis the Adventure	Milady		
1991	Magical Taruruto-kun	Ociel Diccianne		
1991	Urusei Yatsura: Always My Darling	Lum		
2006	Detective Conan: The Private Eyes' Requiem	Reiko Shimizu		
2013	The Garden of Words	Takao's Mother		
2013	Dareka no Manazashi	Narrator		
2014	Pretty Cure All Stars New Stage 3: Eternal Friends	Māmu		
2015	Tamayura: Graduation Photo Part 3 - Akogare	Maon's mother		
2017	Seitokai Yakuindomo: The Movie	Furuya		
2021	Seitokai Yakuindomo: The Movie 2	Furuya		
2021	Dakaichi: Spain Arc	Yachiyo (present)		
2024	Fureru	Itsuki's Wife		
2025	The Rose of Versailles	Madame Noailles		
2026	Mononoke the Movie: The Curse of the Serpent	Tokiwai		

=== Original video animation (OVA) ===
- Ariel (Simone Trefan)
- Legend of the Galactic Heroes (Dominique Saint-Pierre)
- MD Geist (Vaiya in the Director's Cut)
- Outlanders (Kahm)
- Shōchū-hai Lemon Love 30s Ame ni Nurete mo
- Urusei Yatsura (Lum)
- Is This a Zombie? (Eucliwood Hellscythe)

=== Video games ===
- Injustice: Gods Among Us (Catwoman)
- Tactics Ogre: Reborn (Deneb Rove)

=== Live action ===
- The Red Spectacles (1987) (Airport announcer)

=== Dubbing ===
- Blue Jasmine, Ginger (Sally Hawkins)
- Blue Steel, Megan Turner (Jamie Lee Curtis)
- ER, Elaine Nichols (Rebecca De Mornay)
- The Fall Guy, Jody Banks (Heather Thomas)
- Goodfellas, Karen Hill (Lorraine Bracco)
- Private School (1984 Fuji TV edition), Jordan Leigh-Jensen (Betsy Russell)
- Superman III (1985 TV Asahi edition), Lois Lane (Margot Kidder)
