= The Solitary Gourmet =

Japanese manga series

- Manga cover

孤独のグルメ (Kodoku no Gurume)
- Genre: Slice of life
- Manga
- Written by: Masayuki Kusumi
- Illustrated by: Jiro Taniguchi
- Published by: Fusosha
- English publisher: Fanfare/Ponent Mon
- Magazine: Weekly Spa!
- Original run: 1994 – 2015
- Volumes: 2
- Television drama
- Original network: TV Tokyo
- Original run: January 4, 2012 – present
- Episodes: 120 + 11 SP + 24 original episodes
- Television drama
- Original network: Youku
- Original run: May 28, 2015 – August 13, 2015
- Episodes: 12
- Original net animation
- Studio: Production I.G
- Released: November 29, 2017
- Runtime: 3 minutes
- Episodes: 10

The Solitary Gourmet (Japanese: 孤独のグルメ, Hepburn: Kodoku no Gurume) is a Japanese cuisine seinen manga series written by Masayuki Kusumi, and illustrated by Jiro Taniguchi.

The manga has been adapted into a number of media. It was adapted into a Japanese television drama series starring Yutaka Matsushige that first began airing in 2012. A Chinese web series adaptation starring Winston Chao was released in 2015. A 10-episode original net animation adaptation premiered on Production I.G's Tate Anime app in 2017. A feature film continuation of the Japanese drama series was released in 2025.

== Plot ==
As a salesman, Gorō Inogashira (井之頭五郎) travels Japan, where he visits various restaurants and street booths to sample the local cuisine, with each chapter featuring a different place and dish. Notably, Gorō does not drink alcohol with his meals.

== Manga translations ==
- Der Gourmet – Von der Kunst allein zu genießen ISBN 9783551768674
- Le Gourmet solitaire (Casterman, 2005)
- The Solitary Gourmet (Ponent Mon, 2025) ISBN 9781912097449

== Japanese TV series ==
A Japanese live action television adaptation starring Yutaka Matsushige as Gorō Inogashira and Masayuki Kusumi as himself began airing on TV Tokyo in 2012. Original manga writer Masayuki Kusumi formed a band, The Screen Tones, to produce music for the series.

Each episode of the show sees main character Gorō Inogashira meeting a client or interacting with local residents before becoming hungry and heading off to find a restaurant to eat at. All the restaurants featured on the show are real businesses; however the restaurant staff are replaced by actors when filming the episode. At the end of each episode, in an unscripted segment Masayuki Kusumi visits the restaurant showcased in the episode to sample its menu and offer his thoughts.

Matsushige also co-wrote and directed a feature film continuation of the series, also titled The Solitary Gourmet, that was released theatrically in Japan on January 10, 2025.

In 2014, the Solitary Gourmet Pilgrim Guide, an official restaurant guide featuring a selection of eateries from the first three seasons of the show was published by Fusosha. An updated Complete Edition, covering seasons one to ten was released in 2025 in association with the feature film.

In March 2026, TV Tokyo launched a dedicated YouTube channel for the 2012 Solitary Gourmet television drama aimed at international viewers. The episodes are uploaded at a rate of one per week with English subtitles and an AI-assisted English dub.

=== Episodes ===
==== Season 1 ====
No. overall	No. in season	Title	Directed by	Written by	Original release date
1	1	"Yakitori and fried rice in Monzen-nakachō, Kōtō" (江東区 門前仲町のやきとりと焼めし)	Kenji Mizoguchi	Yoshihiro Taguchi	January 5, 2012
2	2	"Boiled fish set menu in Komagome, Toshima" (豊島区 駒込の煮魚定食)	Kenji Mizoguchi	Yoshihiro Taguchi	January 12, 2012
3	3	"Brothless dandan noodles in Ikebukuro, Toshima" (豊島区 池袋の汁なし担々麺)	Tadaaki Hōrai	Yoshihiro Taguchi	January 19, 2012
4	4	"Shizuoka oden in Urayasu, Chiba Prefecture" (千葉県 浦安市の静岡おでん)	Tadaaki Hōrai	Yoshihiro Taguchi	January 26, 2012
5	5	"Oyakodon and yaki udon in Eifuku, Suginami" (杉並区 永福の親子丼と焼うどん)	Tadaaki Hōrai	Yoshihiro Taguchi	February 2, 2012
6	6	"Garlic pork loin in Saginomiya, Nakano" (中野区 鷺宮のロースにんにく焼)	Kenji Mizoguchi	Katsui Itazaka	February 9, 2012
7	7	"Kissaten naporitan in Kichijōji, Musashino" (武蔵野市吉祥寺 喫茶店のナポリタン)	Tadaaki Hōrai	Yoshihiro Taguchi	February 16, 2012
8	8	"Yakiniku at Hatchōnawate Station in Kawasaki, Kanagawa" (神奈川県川崎市 八丁畷の一人焼肉)	Kenji Mizoguchi	Yoshihiro Taguchi	February 23, 2012
9	9	"Hiroshima-style okonomiyaki in Shimokitazawa, Setagaya" (世田谷区 下北沢の広島風お好み焼き)	Tadaaki Hōrai	Yoshihiro Taguchi	March 1, 2012
10	10	"Pork shogayaki in Nagasaki, Toshima" (豊島区 東長崎のしょうが焼目玉丼)	Kenji Mizoguchi	Yoshihiro Taguchi	March 8, 2012
11	11	"Extra-spicy curry rice in Nezu, Bunkyō" (文京区 根津 飲み屋さんの特辛カレーライス)	Kenji Mizoguchi	Yoshihiro Taguchi	March 8, 2012
12	12	"Soki soba and agu pork shioyaki in Nakameguro" (第十二話 3月22日 目黒区 中目黒 ソーキそばとアグー豚の天然塩焼き)	Tadaaki Hōrai	Yoshihiro Taguchi	March 8, 2012

==== Season 2 ====
No. overall	No. in season	Title	Directed by	Written by	Original release date
13	1	"Fried meat with green onions at Shin-Maruko Station" (神奈川県川崎市新丸子のネギ肉イタメ)	Kenji Mizoguchi	Yoshihiro Taguchi	October 10, 2012
14	2	"Tempura donburi in Nihonbashi" (中央区日本橋人形町の黒天丼)	Kenji Mizoguchi	Yoriko Kodama	October 17, 2012
15	3	"Wasabi kalbi with tamago kake gohan at Numabukuro Station" (中野区沼袋のわさびカルビと卵かけご飯)	Kenji Mizoguchi	Yoshihiro Taguchi	October 24, 2012
16	4	"Brazilian cuisine in Ōizumi, Gunma" (群馬県邑楽郡大泉町のブラジル料理)	Tadaaki Horai	Yoshihiro Taguchi	October 31, 2012
17	5	"Fried pork with onion and garlic at Hakuraku Station, Yokohama" (神奈川県横浜市白楽の豚肉と玉ねぎのニンニク焼き)	Tadaaki Horai	Yoshihiro Taguchi	November 7, 2012
18	6	"Extra-spicy Sichuan cuisine at Keisei Koiwa Station, Edogawa" (江戸川区 京成小岩の激辛四川料理)	Tadaaki Horai	Yoriko Kodama	November 14, 2012
19	7	"Sanma namerō and hamaguri sakamushi in Iioka, Chiba" (千葉県旭市 飯岡のサンマのなめろうと蛤の酒蒸し)	Tadaaki Horai	Yoshihiro Taguchi	November 21, 2012
20	8	"Chankonabe for one in Ryōgoku, Sumida" (墨田区両国の一人ちゃんこ鍋)	Kenji Mizoguchi	Yoshihiro Taguchi	November 28, 2012
21	9	"Office meal from Sunamachi Ginza, Kōtō" (江東区砂町銀座商店街を経て事務所飯)	Kenji Mizoguchi	Yoshihiro Taguchi	December 5, 2012
22	10	"Smoked mackerel and sweet tamagoyaki in Kita" (北区十条の鯖のくんせいと甘い玉子焼)	Kenji Mizoguchi	Yoshihiro Taguchi	December 12, 2012
23	11	"Thai curry and no-soup chicken noodles in Adachi" (足立区北千住のタイカレーと鶏の汁無し麺)	Tadaaki Horai	Yoshihiro Taguchi	December 19, 2012
24	12	"Mom's korokke and buri-daikon in Mitaka" (東京都三鷹市 お母さんのコロッケとぶり大根)	Kenji Mizoguchi	Yoshihiro Taguchi	December 26, 2012

==== Season 3 ====
No. overall	No. in season	Title	Directed by	Written by	Original release date
25	1	"Guineafowl and unadon in Akabane, Kita" (北区赤羽のほろほろ鳥とうな丼)	Kenji Mizoguchi	Yoshihiro Taguchi	July 10, 2013
26	2	"Offal and ginger, 'patan' yakisoba in Hinodechō, Yokohama" (神奈川県横浜市 日ノ出町のチートのしょうが炒めとパタン)	Kenji Mizoguchi	Yoshihiro Taguchi	July 17, 2013
27	3	"Wasabi-don in Kawazu, Shizuoka" (静岡県賀茂郡 河津町の生ワサビ付わさび丼)	Kenji Mizoguchi	Yoshihiro Taguchi	July 24, 2013
28	4	"Fried sablefish at Edogawabashi Station" (文京区 江戸川橋の魚屋さんの銀だら西京焼)	Kenji Mizoguchi	Yoshihiro Taguchi	July 31, 2013
29	5	"Lamb and laghman in Nakano" (中野区 東中野の羊の鉄鍋とラグマン)	Takashi Igawa	Yoshihiro Taguchi	August 7, 2013
30	6	"Horumonyaki in Itabashi" (板橋区 板橋のホルモン焼き)	Kenji Mizoguchi	Yoshihiro Taguchi	August 14, 2013
31	7	"Mushroom garlic oyster gratin at Komaba-tōdaimae Station" (目黒区 駒場東大前のマッシュルームガーリックとカキグラタン)	Tadaaki Horai	Yoshihiro Taguchi	August 21, 2013
32	8	"Avocado-chicken menchi-katsu and chicken rice pot in Uguisudani, Taitō" (台東区 鶯谷のアボカド鶏メンチと鶏鍋めし)	Kenji Mizoguchi	Yoshihiro Taguchi	August 28, 2013
33	9	"Roast pork sandwich and sausage at Kotake-mukaihara Station" (練馬区 小竹向原のローストポークサンドイッチとサルシッチャ)	Tadaaki Horai	Yoriko Kodama	September 4, 2013
34	10	"Flaming shabu-shabu and mugitoro in Nishiogu, Arakawa" (荒川区 西尾久の炎の酒鍋と麦とろ飯)	Kenji Mizoguchi	Yoshihiro Taguchi	September 11, 2013
35	11	"Roadside beef stew and kamameshi in Tōkamachi" (新潟県 十日町市のドライブインの牛肉の煮込みと五目釜めし)	Takashi Igawa	Yoshihiro Taguchi	September 18, 2013
36	12	"Sardine yukhoe and nigiri sushi in Ōi, Kanagawa" (品川区 大井町のいわしのユッケとにぎり寿司)	Kenji Mizoguchi	Yoshihiro Taguchi	September 25, 2013

==== Season 4 ====
No. overall	No. in season	Title	Directed by	Written by	Original release date
37	1	"Spicy fried meat and beans in Kiyose" (東京都清瀬市のもやしと肉のピリ辛イタメ)	Kenji Mizoguchi	Yoshihiro Taguchi	July 9, 2014
38	2	"Korean tempura and samgye-tang ramen in Ginza" (中央区 銀座の韓国風天ぷらと参鶏湯ラーメン)	Kenji Mizoguchi	Yoshihiro Taguchi	July 16, 2014
39	3	"Steak don in Hakone, Kanagawa" (神奈川県 足柄下郡 箱根町のステーキ丼)	Takashi Igawa	Yoshihiro Taguchi	July 23, 2014
40	4	"Hire galbi and sukiyaki-style sirloin in Hachiōji" (東京都 八王子市 小宮町のヒレカルビとロースすき焼き風)	Kenji Mizoguchi	Yoshihiro Taguchi	July 30, 2014
41	5	"Anchovy tempura and takomeshi in Himakajima" (愛知県 知多郡 日間賀島のしらすの天ぷらとたこめし)	Takashi Igawa	Yoshihiro Taguchi	August 6, 2014
—	special	"Blue mackerel and wakadori soup-taki in Nakasu" (福岡県 福岡市 博多区中洲の鯖ごまと若どりスープ炊き)	Kenji Mizoguchi	Yoshihiro Taguchi	August 9, 2014
42	6	"Cheese kulcha and lamb mint curry in Kiba, Kōtō" (東京都 江東区 木場のチーズクルチャとラムミントカレー)	Takashi Igawa	Yoshihiro Taguchi	August 13, 2014
43	7	"Alaska pollock cream pasta and katsu sandwich in Torigoe, Taitō" (台東区 鳥越の明太クリームパスタとかつサンド)	Kenji Mizoguchi	Yoshihiro Taguchi	August 20, 2014
44	8	"Oxtail soup and açaí bowl in Asagaya, Suginami" (杉並区阿佐ヶ谷のオックステールスープとアサイーボウル)	Takashi Igawa	Yoshihiro Taguchi	August 27, 2014
45	9	"Mo Takuto (Mao Zedong) spareribs and black rice in Jingumae, Shibuya" (渋谷区 神宮前の毛沢東スペアリブと黒チャーハン)	Kenji Mizoguchi	Yoshihiro Taguchi	September 3, 2014
46	10	"Ham and eggs set meal and cutlet plate in Edagawa, Koto" (江東区 枝川のハムエッグ定食とカツ皿)	Kenji Mizoguchi	Yoshihiro Taguchi	September 10, 2014
47	11	"Vietnamese shrimp salad roll and chicken glutinous rice in Kamata, Ōta" (大田区 蒲田の海老の生春巻きととりおこわ)	Kenji Mizoguchi	Yoshihiro Taguchi	September 17, 2014
48	12	"Shrimp dumplings and grilled rice balls in Ebisu, Shibuya" (渋谷区 恵比寿の海老しんじょうと焼おにぎり)	Kenji Mizoguchi	Yoshihiro Taguchi	September 24, 2014

==== Season 5 ====
No. overall	No. in season	Title	Directed by	Written by	Original release date
49	1	"Garlic skirt steak and samgyeopsal in Inadazutsumi, Kawasaki" (神奈川県川崎市 稲田堤のガーリックハラミとサムギョプサル)	Kenji Mizoguchi	Yoshihiro Taguchi	October 3, 2015
50	2	"Popeye bacon and saury sashimi in Koto" (東京都 江東区 清澄白河のポパイベーコンとサンマクンセイ刺)	Kenji Mizoguchi	Yoshihiro Taguchi	October 10, 2015
51	3	"Lamb hamburger and vegetable couscous in Nishiogikubo, Suginami" (東京都 杉並区 西荻窪のラム肉のハンバーグと野菜のクスクス)	Takashi Igawa	Yoriko Kodama	October 17, 2015
52	4	"Stir-deep-fried pork red yeast rice in Yilan County" (台湾 宜蘭県 羅東の三星葱の肉炒めと豚肉の紅麹揚げ)	Kenji Mizoguchi	Yoshihiro Taguchi	October 24, 2015
53	5	"Chicken rice and dried noodles in Taipei" (台湾 台北市 永楽市場の鶏肉飯と乾麺)	Kenji Mizoguchi	Yoshihiro Taguchi	October 31, 2015
54	6	"Cold chazuke with Namerō and Kue set meal in Ōokayama, Meguro" (東京都 目黒区 大岡山の九絵定食となめろう冷茶漬け)	Takashi Igawa	Yoshihiro Taguchi	November 7, 2015
55	7	"Lamb shoulder loin and lamb chops in Funabashi, Setagaya" (東京都 世田谷区 千歳船橋のラム肩ロースとラムチョップ)	Takashi Igawa	Yoshihiro Taguchi	November 14, 2015
56	8	"Ema datshi and pakshapa in Yoyogi-Uehara, Shibuya" (東京都 渋谷区 代々木上原のエマダツィとパクシャパ)	Kenji Mizoguchi	Yoriko Kodama	November 21, 2015
57	9	"Grilled pork rice and mixed fried in Ohara, Isumi" (千葉県 いすみ市 大原のブタ肉塩焼ライスとミックスフライ)	Takashi Igawa	Yoshihiro Taguchi	November 27, 2015
58	10	"Pork liver rice bowl in Kameido, Koto" (東京都 江東区 亀戸の純レバ丼皿)	Kenji Mizoguchi	Yoshihiro Taguchi	December 5, 2015
59	11	"Oyster meuniere and omurice with American sauce in Sengendai, Koshigaya" (埼玉県 越谷市 せんげん台のカキのムニエルとアメリカンソースのオムライス)	Takashi Igawa	Yoshihiro Taguchi	December 12, 2015
60	12	"Sukiyaki in Nishisugamo, Toshima" (東京都 豊島区 西巣鴨の一人すき焼き)	Kenji Mizoguchi	Yoshihiro Taguchi	December 19, 2015
—	special	"Shinkoyaki and other croquettes in Asahikawa" (北海道 旭川市の新子焼きとかにくり～むコロッケ)	Kenji Mizoguchi	Yoshihiro Taguchi	January 1, 2016
—	special	"Beef tongue set meal with seafood bowl of Onagawa in Sendai" (宮城県 仙台市の牛たん定食と三陸女川町の海鮮五色丼)	Takashi Igawa	Yoshihiro Taguchi	August 3, 2016
—	special	"Pork liver and Chinese chive stir-fry with rib steak from Tsudanuma in Nakano" (東京都中野のレバニラ炒めと千葉県津田沼のリブステーキ)	Kenji Mizoguchi	Yoshihiro Taguchi	January 2, 2017

==== Season 6 ====
No. overall	No. in season	Title	Directed by	Written by	Original release date
61	1	"Okonomiyaki set meal and plain kushikatsu in Bishoen, Osaka" (大阪府 美章園のお好み焼き定食と平野の串かつ)	Kenji Mizoguchi	Yoshihiro Taguchi	April 8, 2017
62	2	"Pork shogayaki set meal in Yodobashi, Shinjuku" (東京都 新宿区 淀橋市場の豚バラ生姜焼定食)	Takashi Igawa	Yoshihiro Taguchi	April 15, 2017
63	3	"Chicken and vegetable medicinal soup curry in Mita, Meguro" (東京都 目黒区 三田のチキンと野菜の薬膳スープカレー)	Takashi Igawa	Yoshihiro Taguchi	April 22, 2017
64	4	"Special Salted Beef Tongue and Kainomi of Higashi-Yamatoshi, Tokyo" (東京都東大和市の上タンシオとカイノミ)	Takashi Igawa	Yoshihiro Taguchi	April 28, 2017
65	5	"Conveyor Belt Sushi of Sangenjaya, Setagaya Ward, Tokyo" (東京都世田谷区 太子堂の回転寿司)	Takashi Igawa	Yoshihiro Taguchi	May 5, 2017
66	6	"Stir Fry Pork with Pickled Takana Mustard Greens and Beef Soup Soba of Takadanobaba, Shinjuku Ward, Tokyo" (東京都新宿区高田馬場シャン風豚高菜漬け炒めと牛スープそば)	Takashi Igawa	Yoshihiro Taguchi	May 12, 2017
67	7	"Sara Udon and Spring Rolls of Dogenzaka, Shibuya Ward, Tokyo" (東京都渋谷区道玄坂の皿うどんと春巻)	Takashi Igawa	Yoshihiro Taguchi	May 19, 2017
68	8	"Stir Fry Lamb with Leeks and Spareribs of Okachimachi, Taito Ward, Tokyo" (東京都台東区御徒町のラム肉長葱炒めとスペアリブ)	Takashi Igawa	Yoshihiro Taguchi	May 26, 2017
69	9	"Zarzuela and Squid Ink Paella of Hatanodai, Shinagawa Ward, Tokyo" (東京都品川区旗の台のサルスエラとイカ墨パエリア)	Takashi Igawa	Yoshihiro Taguchi	June 9, 2017
70	10	"Aji Fry Set Meal of Kanaya, Futtsu, Chiba Prefecture" (千葉県富津市金谷のアジフライ定食)	Takashi Igawa	Yoshihiro Taguchi	June 16, 2017
71	11	"Chilled Dandan Noodles and Twice Cooked Pork of Myogadani, Bunkyo Ward, Tokyo" (東京都文京区茗荷谷の冷やしタンタン麺と回鍋肉)	Takashi Igawa	Yoshihiro Taguchi	June 23, 2017
72	12	"Deep Fried Corn and Beef Rice - Gotanda, Shinagawa Ward Tokyo" (東京都品川区五反田の揚げトウモロコシと牛ご飯)	Takashi Igawa	Yoshihiro Taguchi	June 30, 2017

==== Season 7 ====
No. overall	No. in season	Title	Directed by	Written by	Original release date
73	1	"Shoulder Rosukatsu Set Meal of Honcho, Ageo City, Saitama Prefecture" (上尾の肩ロースカツ定食)	Kenji Mizoguchi	Yoshihiro Taguchi	April 6, 2018
74	2	"One-Person Buffet of Kondo, Setagaya Ward, Tokyo" (東京都世田谷区経堂の一人バイキング)	Takashi Igawa	Yoshihiro Taguchi	April 13, 2018
75	3	"Queso Fundido and Pipian Verde of Minami-Azabu, Minato Ward, Tokyo" (東京都港区南麻布のチョリソのケソフンディードと鶏肉のピピアンベルデ)	Takashi Igawa	Yoshihiro Taguchi	April 20, 2018
76	4	"Tanmen and Pork Sukiyaki of Shimonita, Gunma Prefecture" (群馬県甘楽郡下仁田町のタンメンと豚すき焼き)	Takashi Igawa	Yoshihiro Taguchi	April 27, 2018
77	5	"Green and Red Mapo Tofu of Mikawashima, Arakawa Ward, Tokyo" (東京都荒川区三河島の緑と赤の麻婆豆腐)	Takashi Igawa	Yoshihiro Taguchi	May 4, 2018
78	6	"Black Sablefish Nitsuke Set Meal of Urayasu, Chiba Prefecture" (千葉県浦安市の真っ黒な銀だらの煮付定食)	Takashi Igawa	Yoshihiro Taguchi	May 11, 2018
79	7	"Natto Pizza and Spicy Pasta of Higashi-Mukojima, Sumida Ward, Tokyo" (東京都墨田区東向島の納豆のピザと辛いパスタ)	Takashi Igawa	Yoshihiro Taguchi	May 18, 2018
80	8	"Chicken Nanban and Jidori Momokushi of Hyakken Yokocho, Nakano Ward, Tokyo" (東京都中野区百軒横丁のチキン南蛮と地鶏もも串)	Takashi Igawa	Yoshihiro Taguchi	May 25, 2018
81	9	"Natto Chigae and Self Bibimbap of Jeonju City, South Korea" (韓国チョンジュ市の納豆チゲとセルフビビンパ)	Takashi Igawa	Yoshihiro Taguchi	June 8, 2018
82	10	"Bone-In Pork Ribs Galbi and a Cluster of Side Dishes of Seoul, South Korea" (韓国ソウル特別市の骨付き豚カルビとおかずの群れ)	Takashi Igawa	Yoshihiro Taguchi	June 15, 2018
83	11	"Garlic Soup and Salmon Butter of Chiba City, Chiba Prefecture" (千葉県千葉市の特製ニンニクスープと生鮭のバター焼き)	Takashi Igawa	Yoshihiro Taguchi	June 22, 2018
84	12	"Garlic Chive Ball Rice and Spicy Shrimp of Hatchibori, Chuo Ward, Tokyo" (東京都中央区八丁堀のニラ玉ライスとエビチリ)	Takashi Igawa	Yoshihiro Taguchi	June 29, 2018

==== Season 8 ====
No. overall	No. in season	Title	Directed by	Written by	Original release date
85	1	"Chinese Kamameshi and Shrimp Wonton Noodles of Yokohama Chinatown, Kanagawa Prefecture" (横浜中華街の中華釜飯と海老雲呑麺)	Kenji Mizoguchi	Yoshihiro Taguchi	October 5, 2019
86	2	"Tongue Steak and Meat Patra of Takaido, Suginami Ward, Tokyo" (杉並区高井戸のタンステーキとミートパトラ)	Takashi Igawa	Yoshihiro Taguchi	October 12, 2019
87	3	"Cabbage Rolls Set Meal at a Ginza Bar in Hibiya, Chuo Ward, Tokyo" (東京都中央区銀座のBarのロールキャベツ定食)	Takashi Igawa	Yoshihiro Taguchi	October 19, 2019
88	4	"Meat Soup Udon of Niiza City, Saitama Prefecture, and Castella Pancakes of Hibarigaoka, Nishitokyo" (埼玉県新座市の肉汁うどんと西東京市ひばりが丘のカステラパンケーキ)	Takashi Igawa	Yoshihiro Taguchi	October 26, 2019
89	5	"One person roaster yakiniku in Fujioka city, Gunma prefecture" (群馬県藤岡市の一人ロースター焼き肉)	Takashi Igawa	Yoshihiro Taguchi	November 2, 2019
90	6	"Roast Pork Salad and Jim Jum of Asakusa, Taito Ward, Tokyo" (東京都台東区浅草のローストポークのサラダとチムチュム)	Takashi Igawa	Yoshihiro Taguchi	November 9, 2019
91	7	"German Smoked Mackerel and Spare Ribs of Yuigahama, Kamakura City, Kanagawa Prefecture" (神奈川県鎌倉市由比ガ浜のドイツ風サバの燻製とスペアリブ)	Takashi Igawa	Yoshihiro Taguchi	November 16, 2019
92	8	"Okaku and Horumon Soba of Tottori City, Tottori Prefecture" (鳥取県鳥取市のオーカクとホルモンそば)	Takashi Igawa	Yoshihiro Taguchi	November 23, 2019
93	9	"South Indian Set Meal and Garlic Cheese Dosa of Ochanomizu, Chiyoda Ward, Tokyo" (東京都千代田区御茶ノ水の南インドのカレー定食とガーリックチーズドーサ)	Takashi Igawa	Yoshihiro Taguchi	November 30, 2019
94	10	"Amberjack Teriyaki and Cream Croquettes of Gotokuji, Setagaya Ward, Tokyo" (東京都世田谷区豪徳寺のぶりの照焼き定食とクリームコロッケ)	Takashi Igawa	Yoshihiro Taguchi	December 7, 2019
95	11	"Jingisukan for One of Musashi-Kosugi, Kawasaki City, Kanagawa Prefecture" (神奈川県川崎市武蔵小杉の一人ジンギスカン)	Takashi Igawa	Yoshihiro Taguchi	December 14, 2019
96	12	"Katsudon and Hiyashi Mapo Noodles of Minowa, Taito Ward, Tokyo" (東京都台東区三ノ輪のカツ丼と冷し麻婆麺)	Takashi Igawa	Yoshihiro Taguchi	December 21, 2019

==== Season 9 ====
No. overall	No. in season	Title	Directed by	Written by	Original release date
97	1	"Hirekatsu Gozen and Seafood Cream Croquette in Miyamaedaira, Kawasaki City, Kanagawa Prefecture" (神奈川県川崎市宮前平のひれかつ御膳と魚介クリームコロッケ)	Kenji Mizoguchi	Yoshihiro Taguchi	July 9, 2021
98	2	"Braised Kinmedai and Goro's Original Parfait of Ninomiya, Naka-gun, Kanagawa Prefecture" (神奈川県中郡二宮の金目鯛の煮付けと五郎オリジナルパフェ)	Takashi Igawa	Yoshihiro Taguchi	July 16, 2021
99	3	"Moussaka and Dolmades in Higashi-Azabu, Minato, Tokyo" (東京都港区東麻布のムサカとドルマーデス)	Takashi Igawa	Yoshihiro Taguchi	July 23, 2021
100	4	"Eel Kabayaki Fried Rice with Spicy Oyster and Leeks of Shinmachi, Fuchu-shi, Tokyo" (東京都府中市新町の鰻の蒲焼チャーハンとカキとニラの辛し炒め)	Takashi Igawa	Yoshihiro Taguchi	July 30, 2021
101	5	"Beef and Pork Shabu-shabu from Usami, Ito City, Shizuoka Prefecture" (静岡県伊東市宇佐美の牛焼きしゃぶと豚焼きしゃぶ)	Takashi Igawa	Yoshihiro Taguchi	August 5, 2021
102	6	"Stir-fried meat and eggplant set meal in Minaminagasaki, Toshima-ku, Tokyo" (東京都豊島区南長崎の肉とナスの醤油炒め定食と鳥唐揚げ)	Takashi Igawa	Yoshihiro Taguchi	August 13, 2021
103	7	"Guizhou Home-style Twice-cooked Meat and Natto Hot Pot in Shinkoiwa, Katsushika-ku, Tokyo" (東京都葛飾区新小岩の貴州家庭式回鍋肉と納豆火鍋)	Takashi Igawa	Yoshihiro Taguchi	August 20, 2021
104	8	"Grilled rice balls and sweetfish in Takasaki City, Gunma Prefecture" (群馬県高崎市のおむすびと鮎の塩焼き)	Takashi Igawa	Yoshihiro Taguchi	August 27, 2021
105	9	"Drive-In Yakiniku Set Meal of Mogimachi, Koriyama City, Fukushima Prefecture" (福島県郡山市舞木町ドライブインの焼肉定食)	Takashi Igawa	Yoshihiro Taguchi	September 3, 2021
106	10	"Tripe Stew and Ham-Katsu of Utsunomiya City, Tochigi Prefecture" (栃木県宇都宮市のもつ煮込みとハムカツ)	Takashi Igawa	Yoshihiro Taguchi	September 10, 2021
107	11	"Salt Boiled Mutton and Lamb Zhajiangmian of Sugamo, Toshima Ward, Tokyo" (東京都豊島区巣鴨のチャンサンマハと羊肉ジャージャー麺)	Takashi Igawa	Yoshihiro Taguchi	September 17, 2021
108	12	"Cheese Hamburger Steak and Beef Tenderloin Shogayaki of Isezaki-Chojamachi, Kanagawa Prefecture" (神奈川県伊勢佐木長者町のチーズハンバーグと牛ヒレの生姜焼き)	Takashi Igawa	Yoshihiro Taguchi	September 24, 2021

==== Season 10 ====
No. overall	No. in season	Title	Directed by	Written by	Original release date
109	1	"Stir-fried Beef Stamina and Negitama of Hashimoto, Sagamihara City, Kanagawa Prefecture" (神奈川県相模原市橋本の 牛肉のスタミナ炒めとネギ玉 → 【よしの食堂】)	Takashi Igawa	Yoshihiro Taguchi	October 8, 2022
110	2	"Rendang and Nasi Goreng of Shirokanedai, Minato Ward, Tokyo" (東京都港区白金台の ルンダンとナシゴレン → 【CABE 目黒店】)	Ryūichi Kitabata	Yoriko Kodama	October 15, 2022
111	3	"Sautéed Sea Bream with Aurora Sauce and Tuna Yukhoe Bowl of Sakuragicho, Yokohama City, Kanagawa Prefecture" (神奈川県横浜市桜木町の真鯛のソテーオーロラソースとまぐろのユッケどんぶり → 【キッチンカフェばる】)	Takashi Igawa	Yoshihiro Taguchi	October 22, 2022
112	4	"Turban Shells and Mushroom Provence-Style and Beef Tongue Stew Omurice of Oizumi Gakuen, Nerima Ward, Tokyo" (東京都練馬区大泉学園のサザエときのこのプロヴェンス風と牛タンシチューのオムライス → 【ビストロKUROKAWA】)	Gō Sasaki	Yoshihiro Taguchi	October 28, 2022
113	5	"Negi-Liver Stir-Fry and Chicken Skin Gyoza of Washinoya, Kashiwa City, Chiba Prefecture" (千葉県柏市鷲野谷のネギレバ炒と鶏皮餃子 → 【いづみ亭】)	Daiki Nakayama	Yoshihiro Taguchi	November 5, 2022
114	6	"Tonchan and Keichan of Gero City, Gifu Prefecture" (岐阜県下呂市のとんちゃんとけいちゃん → 【大衆食堂 大安】)	Ryūichi Kitabata	Yoshihiro Taguchi	November 12, 2022
115	7	"Fu-Chanpuru and Tomato Curry Tsukesoba of Sasazuka, Shibuya Ward, Tokyo" (東京都渋谷区笹塚のふうちゃんぷるとトマトカレーつけそば → 【山横沢】)	Takashi Igawa	Yoriko Kodama	November 19, 2022
116	8	"Crab Mask Oden and Seafood Bowl of Toyama City, Toyama Prefecture" (富山県富山市のかに面おでんと海鮮とろろ丼 → 【居酒屋舞子】)	Ryūichi Kitabata	Yoshihiro Taguchi	November 26, 2022
117	9	"Sweet and Sour Pork and Jamja Noodles of Nippori, Arakawa Ward, Tokyo" (東京都荒川区日暮里の酢豚とチャムチャ麺 → 【韓国料理 世味】)	Takashi Igawa	Yoriko Kodama	December 3, 2022
118	10	"Pork Steamed Rice Rolls and Wonton Noodles of Nakahara Ward, Kawasaki City, Kanagawa Prefecture" (神奈川県川崎市中原区の豚肉腸粉と雲吞麺 → 【粥菜坊】)	Gō Sasaki	Yoshihiro Taguchi	December 10, 2022
119	11	"Salt-Wasabi Pork Rosu Saute of Asahi City, Chiba Prefecture" (千葉県旭市の塩ワサビの豚ロースソテー → 【レストランバイキング】)	Daiki Nakayama	Yoshihiro Taguchi	December 17, 2022
120	12	"Italian Restaurant Meatloaf of Kojimachi, Chiyoda Ward, Tokyo" (東京都千代田区麹町のイタリア食堂のミートローフ → 【ラ・タベルナ】)	Ryūichi Kitabata	Yoshihiro Taguchi	December 24, 2022

==== Season 11 ====
No. overall	No. in season	Title	Directed by	Written by	Original release date
121	1	"Zengyo-style Mirin-marinated Mackerel and Pork Miso Soup of Zengyo, Fujisawa City, Kanagawa Prefecture" (神奈川県藤沢市 善行のさばみりんと豚汁 → 【おうちごはん はるね】)	Takashi Igawa	Yoshihiro Taguchi	April 4, 2026
122	2	"Tandoori Chicken and Mutton Masala of Nishi Azabu, Minato Ward, Tokyo" (東京都港区 西麻布のタンドリーチキンとマトン・マサラ → 【インディアンレストラン西麻布 by KENBOKKE】)	Ryūichi Kitabata	Yoshihiro Taguchi	April 11, 2026
123	3	"Spicy Stir-fried Lamb Shoulder with Fermented Vegetables, and Pork Belly and Cucumber with Garlic Sauce of Sengoku, Bunkyo Ward, Tokyo" (東京都文京区 千石のラムショルダー発酵菜スパイシー炒めと豚バラきゅうりガーリックソース → 【四川家庭料理 中洞】)	Daiki Nakayama	Yoshihiro Taguchi	April 18, 2026
124	4	"Bagna Cauda and Spleen Panini of Hon-Atsugi, Atsugi City, Kanagawa Prefecture" (神奈川県厚木市 本厚木のバーニャカウダと脾臓のパニーニ → 【タベルナ ラ・メッセ】 )	Takashi Igawa	Yoshihiro Taguchi	April 25, 2026
125	5	"Bún thịt nướng and Chả giò of Kami-Iiyama, Yokohama City, Kanagawa Prefecture" (神奈川県横浜市 上飯田町のブンティットヌングとチャージョー → 【タイ ハー】)	Ryūichi Kitabata	Yoshihiro Taguchi	May 2, 2026
126	6	"Thinly Sliced Pork Teppanyaki of Ikejiri-ōhashi, Meguro Ward, Tokyo" (東京都目黒区 池尻大橋の豚のうす切鉄板焼 → 【鉄板焼不二】)	Kento Kitao	Yoshihiro Taguchi	May 9, 2026
127	7	"Swordfish Meunière with Spinach Cream Sauce of Higashijūjō, Kita Ward, Tokyo" (東京都北区 東十条のカジキのムニエルホーレン草のクリームソース → 【吉良亭】)	Daiki Nakayama	Yoshihiro Taguchi	May 16, 2026
128	8	"Taiwan Ramen and Boiled Dumplings of Hasuda City, Saitama Prefecture" (埼玉県 蓮田市の台湾ラーメンと水餃子 → 【台湾料理 翠芳】)	Ayami Tao	Yoriko Kodama	May 23, 2026
129	9	"Liver Steak Set Meal of Toride City, Ibaraki Prefecture" (茨城県 取手市のレバステーキ定食 → 【越後屋】)	Kento Kitao	Yoshihiro Taguchi	May 30, 2026
130	10	"Deep-Fried Horse Mackerel and Deep-Fried Frigate Tuna of Takataki, Ichihara City, Chiba Prefecture" (千葉県市原市 高滝のアジフライとハガツオフライ → 【FLYDAY】)	Daiki Nakayama	Yoshihiro Taguchi	June 6, 2026
131	11	"Garlic-Grilled Tuna Set Meal of Yokoshibahikari, Chiba Prefecture" (千葉県 横芝光町のまぐろガーリック焼定食 → 【まぐろや】)	Kento Kitao	Yoshihiro Taguchi	June 13, 2026
132	12	"Stewed Katsudon Set Meal of Takasago, Katsushika Ward, Tokyo" (東京都葛飾区 高砂のかつ煮定食 → 【御食事処ときわ】)	Ryūichi Kitabata	Yoshihiro Taguchi	June 20, 2026

==== Specials ====
No. overall	No. in season	Title	Directed by	Written by	Original release date
1	TBA	"Midsummer business trip to Hakata" (孤独のグルメ Season4 特別編! 真夏の博多出張スペシャル)	Kenji Mizoguchi	Yoshihiro Taguchi	August 9, 2014
2	TBA	"Midwinter business trip to Hokkaido/Asahikawa" (孤独のグルメ お正月スペシャル 真冬の北海道・旭川出張編)	Kenji Mizoguchi	Yoshihiro Taguchi	January 1, 2016
3	TBA	"Midsummer business trip to Tohoku/Miyagi" (孤独のグルメスペシャル! 真夏の東北・宮城出張編)	Takashi Igawa	Yoshihiro Taguchi	August 3, 2016
4	TBA	"A Long Day of Goro Inogashira" (孤独のグルメ 2017お正月スペシャル 井之頭五郎の長い一日)	Kenji Mizoguchi	Yoshihiro Taguchi	January 2, 2017
5	TBA	"Business trip to Setouchi" (孤独のグルメ 大晦日スペシャル〜食べ納め!瀬戸内出張編〜)	Kenji Mizoguchi; Takashi Igawa	Yoshihiro Taguchi	December 31, 2017
6	TBA	"Business trip to Kyoto/Nagoya" (孤独のグルメ 大晦日スペシャル ～京都・名古屋出張編～ 生放送でいただきます!)	Kenji Mizoguchi; Takashi Igawa	Yoshihiro Taguchi	December 31, 2018
7	TBA	"Bullet business trip to Narita - Fukuoka - Busan" (孤独のグルメ 2019大晦日スペシャル 緊急指令!成田～福岡～釜山 弾丸出張編!)	Takashi Igawa; Ryūichi Kitabata	Yoshihiro Taguchi	December 31, 2019
8	TBA	"My meals are not secret, Lonely Firework Operation!" (孤独のグルメ 2020 大晦日スペシャル～俺の食事に密はない、孤独の花火大作戦!～)	Takashi Igawa	Yoshihiro Taguchi	December 31, 2020
9	TBA	"Superb view, year-end road movie" (孤独のグルメ 2021 大晦日スペシャル〜激走!絶景絶品・年忘れロードムービー〜)	Takashi Igawa; Ryūichi Kitabata; Gō Sasaki	Yoshihiro Taguchi	December 31, 2021
10	TBA	"The forgotten food martial arts. The use of crab is great" (孤独のグルメ2022大晦日スペシャル 年忘れ、食の格闘技。カニの使いはあらたいへん。)	Takashi Igawa; Ryūichi Kitabata	Yoshihiro Taguchi	December 31, 2022
11	TBA	"Goro Inogashira flees to the south: Don't look for it." (孤独のグルメ2023大晦日スペシャル 井之頭五郎、南へ逃避行『探さないでください。』)	Ryūichi Kitabata; Takashi Igawa	Yoshihiro Taguchi	December 31, 2023
12	TBA	"From the Pacific to the Sea of Japan. Goro heads north, to where *they* are." (孤独のグルメ2024大晦日スペシャル 太平洋から日本海 五郎、北へ あの人たちの所まで。)	Ryūichi Kitabata; Takashi Igawa; Kento Kitao	Yoshihiro Taguchi	December 31, 2024
13	TBA	"Goro will carry his own refills!" (孤独のグルメ2025大晦日スペシャル おかわりは、五郎セルフで運びます!)	Takashi Igawa; Ryūichi Kitabata; Daiki Nakagawa	Yoshihiro Taguchi	December 31, 2025

==== Original Streaming Series 1 & 2 2022 (配信オリジナル) ====
No. overall	No. in season	Title	Directed by	Written by	Original release date
1	1	"Sharing a table" (相席編)	Ryūichi Kitabata	Yoshihiro Taguchi	March 31, 2022
2	2	"Rookie Clerk" (新人店員編)	Ryūichi Kitabata	Yoshihiro Taguchi	March 31, 2022
3	3	"Meals" (賄い編)	Gō Sasaki	Yoriko Kodama	March 31, 2022
4	4	"Eating Style" (食の流儀編)	Ryūichi Kitabata	Yoriko Kodama	March 31, 2022
5	5	"Take-away" (テイクアウト編)	Daiki Nakayama	Yoshihiro Taguchi	March 31, 2022
6	6	"Delivery" (デリバリー編)	Gō Sasaki	Yoshihiro Taguchi	March 31, 2022
7	1	"Izakaya × Hanako" (居酒屋×ハナコ)	Ryūichi Kitabata	Yoshihiro Taguchi	March 27, 2023
8	2	"Izakaya × The Mummy" (居酒屋×ザ・マミィ)	Ryūichi Kitabata	Yoshihiro Taguchi	March 27, 2023
9	3	"Set meal shop x Machiura Pink & Hoshino Disco" (定食屋×街裏ぴんく&ほしのディスコ)	Ryūichi Kitabata	Yoshihiro Taguchi	March 27, 2023
10	4	"Set meal shop x Spicy Garlic" (定食屋×スパイシーガーリック)	Ryūichi Kitabata	Yoshihiro Taguchi	March 27, 2023
11	5	"Chinatown x Tokyo Hoteison" (町中華×東京ホテイソン)	Ryūichi Kitabata	Yoshihiro Taguchi	March 27, 2023
12	6	"Chinatown x Kagaya" (町中華×かが屋)	Ryūichi Kitabata	Yoshihiro Taguchi	March 27, 2023

==== Original Omnibus Series 2024 (それぞれの孤独のグルメ) ====
No. overall	No. in season	Title	Directed by	Written by	Original release date
1	1	"Shrimp Fried Rice and Seafood Spring Rolls in Machiya, Arakawa Ward, Tokyo" (東京都荒川区 町屋の 海老チャーハンと海鮮春巻→ 【中華飯店 一番】)	Ryūichi Kitabata	Yoshihiro Taguchi	October 5, 2024
2	2	"Breakfast at the Self-Service Cafeteria in Yazaike, Adachi Ward, Tokyo" (東京都足立区 谷在家の セルフ食堂の朝ご飯→ 【みたけ食堂】)	Takashi Igawa	Yoshihiro Taguchi	October 12, 2024
3	3	"Jimbocho, Chiyoda Ward, Tokyo Salty Upper Beef Tongue and Grilled Short Ribs" (東京都千代田区 神保町の 上タン塩とゲタカルビ→ 【京城園】)	Ryūichi Kitabata	Yoshihiro Taguchi	October 19, 2024
4	4	"Fried Egg Hamburger Steak and Sea Urchin Cream Croquettes in Kawaguchi City, Saitama Prefecture" (埼玉県 川口市の目玉焼きハンバーグと雲丹クリームコロッケ→ 【キッチンオニオン】)	Ryūichi Kitabata	Yoshihiro Taguchi	October 24, 2024
5	5	"Sauna Meals in Higashi-Ueno, Taito Ward, Tokyo" (東京都台東区 東上野のサウナ飯→ 【サウナセンター稲荷町】)	Daiki Nakayama	Yoshihiro Taguchi	November 2, 2024
6	6	"Pork Belly with Daikon Radish and Fried Mackerel from Hiratsuka City, Kanagawa Prefecture" (神奈川県 平塚市の豚バラ大根とシイラのフライ→ 【平塚バプテスト教会こひつじ食堂】)	Takashi Igawa	Yoshihiro Taguchi	November 9, 2024
7	7	"Gyoza and Rice in Izumo City, Shimane Prefecture" (島根県 出雲市の餃子とライス→ 【餃子屋】)	Kento Kitao	Yoshihiro Taguchi	November 16, 2024
8	8	"Waraji Tonkatsu in Shiraito-dai, Fuchu City, Tokyo" (東京都府中市 白糸台のわらじとんかつ→ 【とんかつ割烹 やすいみ〜と】)	Daiki Nakayama	Yoshihiro Taguchi	November 23, 2024
9	9	"Pork, Kimchi, and Egg Stir-Fry Set Meal at a Drive-In in Katori City, Chiba Prefecture" (千葉県香取市 ドライブインの豚肉キムチ卵炒め定食→ 【与倉ドライブイン】)	Takashi Igawa	Yoshihiro Taguchi	November 30, 2024
10	10	"South Indian Lunch in Arai, Nakano Ward, Tokyo" (東京都中野区 新井の南インドランチ→ 【南印度ダイニング】)	Kento Kitao	Yoshihiro Taguchi	December 7, 2024
11	11	"Chicken Teriyaki and Assorted Side Dishes Set Meal in Kichijoji, Musashino City, Tokyo" (東京都武蔵野市 吉祥寺のチキンてりやきと惣菜盛り合わせ定食→ 【きっちん大浪】)	Ryūichi Kitabata	Yoshihiro Taguchi	December 14, 2024
12	12	"Fatty Tuna Head Meat and Chicken Mizutaki in Kannai, Yokohama, Kanagawa Prefecture" (神奈川県横浜市 関内の大トロ頭肉と鶏の水炊き→ 【鳥獣菜魚 あい川】)	Takashi Igawa	Yoshihiro Taguchi	December 21, 2024

== Chinese web series ==
A Chinese live action web series adaptation (simplified Chinese: 孤独的美食家 中国版; traditional Chinese: 孤獨的美食家 中國版; pinyin: Gūdú dì měishíjiā zhōngguó bǎn) was released on Youku between May and August 2015. Set in Taiwan, it starred Winston Chao as Wu Lang, the adaptation's version of Gorō Inogashira.

Chao also made a cameo as Wu Lang in a Taiwan-set episode of the Japanese drama series in October 2015.

== Original net animation ==
An original net animation of The Solitary Gourmet was published on Tate Anime, a smartphone app by Production I.G. It premiered on November 29, 2017. The episodes were directed by Kazuchika Kise, with Kenyu Horiuchi voicing Gorō Inogashira. Before the premiere of the series, on October 13, 2017, a special program on Tate Anime was released featuring the thoughts of Japanese critic Ryota Fujitsu on the episodes.

=== Episodes ===
No. overall	No. in season	Title	Original release date
1	1	"Stir-fried Pork and Rice in Sanya, Taito, Tokyo" (東京都台東区山谷のぶた肉いためライス)	November 29, 2017
2	2	"Conveyor Belt Sushi in Kichijoji, Musashino, Tokyo" (東京都武蔵野市吉祥寺の廻転寿司)	December 29, 2017
3	3	"Mamekan in Asakusa, Taito, Tokyo" (東京都台東区浅草の豆かん)	March 13, 2018
4	4	"Unadon in Akabane, Kita, Tokyo" (東京都北区赤羽の鰻丼)	June 15, 2018
5	5	"Takoyaki in Nakatsu, Kita-ku, Osaka, Osaka" (大阪府大阪市北区中津のたこ焼き)	June 15, 2018
6	6	"Yakiniku on Cement Street, Kawasaki via the Keihin Industrial Zone" (京浜工業地帯を経て川崎セメント通りの焼き肉)	August 31, 2018
7	7	"Omakase Set Meal in Nishi-Ogikubo, Suginami, Tokyo" (東京都杉編区西荻窪のおまかせ定食)	August 31, 2018
8	8	"Curry Don and Oden in Shakujii Park, Nerima, Tokyo" (東京都練馬区石神井公園のカレー丼とおでん)	August 31, 2018
9	9	"Late-night Convenience Store Foods somewhere in Tokyo" (東京都内某所深夜のコンビニ・フーズ)	August 31, 2018
10	10	"Sanuki Udon on a Department Store Rooftop in Ikebukuro, Toshima, Tokyo" (東京都豊島区池袋のデパート屋上のさぬきうどん)	August 31, 2018

== Reception ==
The Japanese television drama adaptation was a success, and is popular among viewers as "late-night food porn", while restaurants featured in the television drama have remarked about the increase in customers.

The drama's popularity in South Korea led to greater acceptance of people dining out alone, which had been previously stigmatized as awkward. Lead actor Yutaka Matsushige's large following in Korea led Netflix to commission the 2025 reality food show K-foodie meets J-foodie, which follows the Japanese actor and Korean singer Sung Si-kyung as they visit restaurants in both countries.

In 2025, unauthorized clips of the Japanese television drama gained popularity on short-form video platforms such as TikTok, where the main character Gorō Inogashira is often erroneously referred to as "Uncle Mike".

Despite the drama's success, in a 2020 interview Matsushige admitted that he doesn't understand the appeal of the show, questioning why people would find a person eating interesting. He also admitted that he was critical of the idea when first offered the role and thought that it would hurt his future career and make him a target of ridicule. The Solitary Gourmet manga writer Masayuki Kusumi was also initially confused by the show's popularity, believing that the original manga had little substance behind it.
