= List of Tokyo Ravens characters =

The following is a list of characters from the anime, manga, and light novel series Tokyo Ravens written by Kōhei Azano and illustrated by Sumihei.

== Main characters ==
=== Harutora Tsuchimikado ===
Tsuchimikado Harutora (土御門 春虎)

Voiced by: Kaito Ishikawa, Risa Taneda (young) (Japanese); Clifford Chapin (English)

The main protagonist of the first arc and the son of a branch family from the Tsuchimikado clan. Despite being born into a distinguished Onmyouji family, he has no magical powers. He had been living a quiet and normal life, as he could not accomplish anything without any magical powers. When he was young, he made a promise to Natsume Tsuchimikado to become her shikigami and protect her. He goes to school with two close friends: Touji and Hokuto. In the first few episodes, shows his strong feelings for Hokuto and cares for her deeply. After witnessing the tragic death of Hokuto, he became Natsume's shikigami to keep the promise he made to her many years ago. Hokutuo's death also was another reason he was driven to transfer to the academy, in search of Hokuto's master. He seems to have some sort of "bad luck", which he considers to be an ancient curse passed down by his ancestors. He is extremely weak academically and is usually tutored by Natsume to avoid being held back a year. Later in the series, the real identity of Harutora is revealed. He is the real reincarnation of Yakou Tsuchimikado. When he and Natsume were born, their places were exchanged. He was sent to a branch of the family whilst Natsume was sent to the main family. Shortly after he gains the Raven Coat tool, Natsume is killed while under the effects of the tool. He performs the Taizan Fukun Ritual to revive Natsume after regaining his memory when Kon destroys her 5 seals. He is later shown staying by Natsume's side as she wakes up, and then kisses her. He tells her that he is sorry, and he hopes that one day they will meet again.

=== Natsume Tsuchimikado ===
Tsuchimikado Natsume (土御門 夏目)

Voiced by: Kana Hanazawa (Japanese); Caitlin Glass (English)

The main protagonist of the second arc, Natsume is Harutora's childhood friend and the daughter of the main family of the Tsuchimikado clan. She is a prodigal onmyouji attending a school in Tokyo. During her summer break, she comes to Harutora's town and interrupts his peaceful life by holding him to the promise he made long ago, to become her familiar. She is heir to the Tsuchimikado family and is assumed to be the reincarnation of Yakou Tsuchimikado. As a family tradition, she has to present herself as male in front of other onmyouji families, a tradition that was created to hide the true identity of Yakou's reincarnation. However, they found out that she was actually a girl when her clothes were torn apart. She has a Gohou-Type shikigami (Defense Familiars) called Hokuto, a true dragon spirit who has served the main family of Tsuchimikados for generations. She deeply cares about her family reputation and holds the burden of being the next heir of the Tsuchimikado clan. After the incident with Suzuka Dairenji, she is shown to be wearing the same ribbon Hokuto won from Harutora in the shooting game. She cares about Harutora and has had a crush on him since childhood.

=== Touji Ato ===
Ato Tōji (阿刀 冬児)

Voiced by: Ryōhei Kimura (Japanese); Ian Sinclair (English)

A former delinquent well known for always wearing a green bandanna, who is also Harutora's best friend from school, Touji is capable of special spirit sensing and has a vast knowledge of onmyodo. He realized that Natsume had conjured Hokuto well before Hokuto herself. He is enrolled at the Onmyo Academy in Tokyo along with Harutora, and will usually help Harutora if he gets into trouble. He was a victim of the Spiritual Disaster, two years prior to the story. It was revealed that he had been possessed by the oni which caused the Spiritual Disaster; Harutora's father, who is a doctor, treated him although the after-effects remain. Thus in the end he became a half-oni and now tries to gain control to contain the oni inside him. The reason he enrolled to Onmyo Academy was to purify his inner oni.

=== Suzuka Dairenji ===
Dairenji Suzuka (大連寺 鈴鹿)

Voiced by: Ayane Sakura (Japanese); Jad Saxton (English)

The youngest of the Twelve Divine Generals, nicknamed "the Prodigy", she is a wanted criminal for researching and using forbidden magic. Suzuka comes to town searching for Natsume, so she can use her spiritual powers in the Taizan Fukun Ritual which Natsume has been researching, along with Yakou Tsuchimikado, to revive her brother. This leads Suzuka into conflict with the Onmyo Agency. Although she is a powerful onmouji, she is regarded as the weakest Divine General, as Reiji Kagami comments. She is the daughter of the deceased Divine General and the former leader of the Twin Horn Syndicate, Shidou Dairenji. In episode 3, it is revealed that Suzuka and her brother were subjected to deadly experiments by their father before and after their birth, which resulted in her being an excellent Onmyouji. Her brother later died from effects of the experiments; hence she came to Harutora's town to perform the Taizan Fukun Ritual and revive her dead brother. She was also guilty of actions which lead to Hokuto's death, however Harutora releases her from her guilt when he reveals that Hokuto was remotely controlled by its user. After that incident it is heavily implied that she has developed a crush on Harutora but fails to act or even accept these feeling hence knowing of Harutora's feelings for Natsume Tsuchimikado. Most of her magic was temporarily sealed by Onmyo Agency and she later enrolls in the Onmyo Academy as her punishment for the incident in the countryside.

=== Kyouko Kurahashi ===
Kurahashi Kyōuko (倉橋 京子)

Voiced by: Eri Kitamura (Japanese); Leah Clark (English)

The granddaughter of the director of the Onmyo Prep School and heir to the Kurahashi family, Kyouko Kurahashi is one of the top students at the school and one of only 3 known students to possess a Gohou-Type shikigami (which consists of two Yaksha series, man-made familiars called Hakuou & Kokfuu). Initially, she appears antagonistic towards Harutora (and by extension Natsume), due to suspicion around his use of his family's fame and status to be Natsume's shikigami and to suddenly enroll directly into the elite academy mid-semester. After a series of events, she reconciles with Harutora, establishing a friendship based on common ground. She also reveals two surprising truths; firstly, the Kurahashi family were once a branch family of the Tsuchimikado family, and secondly, she had visited the Tsuchimikado's home as young child and made a promise with Natsume. Once they were reunited, however, Natsume treated her as a complete stranger, and frustrated at having her feelings trampled Kyouko uses Harutora as a pretext to start fights between the two girls. Ironically, the person she met that day wasn't Natsume, but Harutora, who she mistook as Natsume. After helping Harutora save Natsume from a Yakou Disciple, the two make up. This later causes Kyouko to admit to Harutora that she is in love with Natsume, because he is her first love. Kyouko now plans to further her relationship with Natsume and forces a reluctant Harutora to assist, as payment for the Yakou Disciple incident. However she later realizes that Harutora is the person she met and that Natsume is a girl, so she renews her plan, now directed at Harutora, with Natsume being her rival.

=== Tenma Momoe ===
Momoe Tenma (百枝 天馬)

Voiced by: Hiro Shimono (Japanese); Jessie James Grelle (English)

A classmate who befriends Harutora and Touji during their first day at the academy, Tenma ends up unwittingly involved in the Yakou Disciple incident when he is caught in an attack from a shikigami called a Kodoku, intended for Harutora. He resolves himself, however, to help Harutora rescue Natsume after listening to his request. Since then, Tenma has been drawn into various events related to the cult, despite his somewhat cowardly nature. He is knowledgeable about current events of the Onmyodo world at large, and sometimes helps Harutora catch up with his studies by lending him his notebook. It was later revealed that Tenma is from a prestigious onymouji family, and is also the successor of the Momoe family and Witchcraft Corporation, his deceased parents' man-made shikigami manufacturing company. The shikigami from the company are for general use, as well as making the use of shikigami accessible to everyone.

=== Akino Souma ===
Souma Akino (相馬 秋乃)

She is a branch family member of the Souma Clan, one of the three great Onmyouji families, and is a "Living Spirit". Akino originally met Natsume in Seihuku Temple and the pair became fast friends. After some "dire circumstances" within the temple, resulting in its destruction, she travels with Natsume and rest of Tsuchimikados to Tokyo.

== Onmyo Academy/Onmyo Preparatory School ==
=== Jin Ohtomo ===
Ōtomo Jin (大友 陣)

Voiced by: Koji Yusa (Japanese); J. Michael Tatum (English)

Harutora's homeroom teacher. A fairly quirky person who tends to be more laid back then one would expect from a teacher, to the point where some would accuse him of being irresponsible. Despite that, he's usually good at giving solid advice to students and is a known activist against the school's harsh policies when comes to education. He lost his leg in a clash with Ashiya Douman and now has a prosthetic leg. He was a former Magic Investigator and Divine General nicknamed "The Shadow" who worked under Daizen Amami to investigate the Twin Horn Syndicate until he resigned and started working as a homeroom teacher at Onmyo Preparatory School in order to observe and protect Natsume.

=== Miyo Kurahashi ===
Kurahashi Miyo (倉橋 美代)

Voiced by: Fumi Hirano (Japanese); Wendy Powell (English)

The current head of the Kurahashi family and Onmyo Prep School, she is a well-known figure in the underworld of Onmyouji and her son (and Kyouko's father) is the Chief of Exorcism Division of Onmyo Agency. The current Kurahashi Clan is considered one of the most powerful Onmyouji families, whose influence over the politics of Onmyoudo and Japan rivals the Tsuchimikado family. A skilled Diviner, she helped the Onmyo Agency solve numerous extremely difficult cases. Miyo is also one of the few people who knew Yakou personally. She has a pet cat which she uses as a messenger to relay information at long distances.

=== Mako Fujino ===
Fujino Mako (富士野 真子)

Voiced by: Kotono Mitsuishi (Japanese); Laura Westel (English)

A 26-year-old matron at the boys dormitory, she works in Onmyo Academy and is also a good friend of Ako Kifu. She's into "Boys Love" relationships, and often fantasizes about it with Ako. She spread rumors about "Harutora, Touji and Natsume's relationship" after being mistaken by Natsume's shikigami with Harutora, who looks exactly like Natsume (albeit with a male body).

=== Ako Kifu ===
Kifu Ako (木府 亜子)

Voiced by: Aya Hisakawa (Japanese); Skyler McIntosh (English)

Matron of the girls dormitory and a good friend of Mako Fujino.

=== Fujiwara ===
Fujiwara (藤原)

Voiced by: Mitsuo Senda (Japanese); Charlie Campbell (English)

An old man who works in the Onmyo Academy, he cares about his students well-being. He is a teacher and also a practical instructor of Onmyoudo. He used to be an independent Exorcist in his younger days.

See Suzu Saotome
See Takiko Souma

== Onmyo Agency ==
=== Zenjirou Kogure ===
Kogure Zenjirō (木暮 禅次朗)

Voiced by: Shinya Takahashi (Japanese); Joel McDonald (English)

An Independent Officer/Exorcist, as well as a Divine General nicknamed the "Omnipotent Sword" working under Onmyo Agency together with Reiji Kagami. He was a classmate of Jin Ohtomo, and they were both in the 36th class of Onmyo Academy. The two, along with Ryo Saotome, were known as the Three Crows of the 36th. His shikigami is a pair of Tengu known as Karasu-Tengu.

=== Karasu-Tengu ===
Karasu-Tengu (烏天狗)

Voiced by: Omi Minami (Japanese); Apphia Yu (Kokuryuu), Michelle Rojas (Dassai), Terri Doty (Reisen), Alexis Tipton (Hou'oubiden) (English)

Karasu-Tengu are the pairs of Crow Shikigami spirits controlled by Zenjirou Kogure. Their names are Kokuryuu, Dassai, Reisen and Hou'oubiden.

=== Reiji Kagami ===
Kagami Reiji (鏡 伶路)

Voiced by: Hiroyuki Yoshino (Japanese); Jarrod Greene (English)

An Independent Officer/Exorcist, Reiji is a First-Class onmyouji and also a powerful Divine General nicknamed "Ogre Eater". He has a rude personality and does not care about other people. He has a scar on his forehead. Like Suzuka, Genji Kurahashi has placed a seal on him to reduce his spiritual powers, however the main source of his powers are from oni he subdues.

=== Shaver ===
Shaver (シェイバ)

Voiced by: Takuma Terashima (Japanese); Jerry Jewell (English)

Reiji's Shikigami, which serves as a medium for the sword Higekiri. After being affected by Ashiya Douman's Magical tool, which can create Spiritual Disasters, Shaver went insane and tried to attack Natsume by forcing her to summon Hokuto for a fight. Shaver was later defeated by Harutora after Harutora's 'semi-awakened state'.

=== Daizen Amami ===
Amami Daizen (天海 大善)

Voiced by: Hiroya Ishimaru (Japanese); Kent Williams (English)

The current chief of the Magic Investigation Division of the Onmyo Agency, Daizen is also a Divine General nicknamed "The Divine Fan". He was the senior of Jin Ohtomo during his time at the Magic Investigation Division of the Onmyo Agency. He is a longtime friend of Miyo Kurahashi, and often addresses her as "Miyo-chan". Amami excels at Illusion magic, Kodama and commands two high class Man-made familiars called Kinji and Ginji.

=== Atsune Hirata ===
Hirata Atsune (比良多 篤祢)

Voiced by: Akira Ishida (Japanese); Micah Solusod (English)

A Magic Investigator working at the Onmyo Agency. After the resignation of Jin Ohtomo, he directs the investigation of the Twin Horn Syndicate.

=== Iwao Miyachi ===
Miyachi Iwao (宮地 磐夫)

Voiced by: Unshō Ishizuka (Japanese); Alex Organ (English)

A powerful First-Class Onmyouji and a Divine General nicknamed "Fire Demon". He is an Exorcism Officer and Commander of Purification Rite Center. A burly figure with a good nature, he is considered one of the strongest of the 12 Divine Generals due to his complete mastery of Acala's Fire Realm Mantra, one of the highest class of fire magic. He serves as Genji's confidant and has strong faith in him.

=== Mari Yuge ===
Yuge Mari (弓削 麻里)

Voiced by: Marina Inoue (Japanese); Alexis Tipton (English)

She is a 24-year-old Independent Officer/Exorcist and a Divine General nicknamed "Binding Princess". Her specialty is in making powerful magical barriers as her nickname suggests.

=== Genji Kurahashi ===
Kurahashi Genji (倉橋 源司)

Voiced by: Jurota Kosugi (Japanese); John Swasey (English)

The Chief of the Exorcism Bureau, current head of the Onmyo Agency and one 12 Divine Generals titled "Heaven's Bearer". He is Kyouko's father and Miyo's son. A well respected man with iron will, strong ambitions and a sharp mind.

=== Tōgo Miyoshi ===
Miyoshi Tougo (三善 十悟)

Voiced by: Hiroshi Tsuchida (Japanese); Jason Kane (English)

A mild mannered man who serves as the chief of the Clairvoyance Division, who function as the Onmyo Agency's intelligence section. He is member of the 12 Divine Generals called the "Divine Eye". Despite a being First Class Shaman his combat skills are comparatively weak, however his true value lies in his unnaturally powerful "Spirit Sight".

=== Etou ===
Etou (江藤)

Voiced by: Kensuke Satō (Japanese); Patrick Seitz (English)

A stern instructor and leader of the 13th Exorcist Squad at Onmyo Agency's Meguro Branch. He was a former Yakou Disicple who was good friend of Makihara and Mutobe. He tried to help his old comrades escape by using a magical tool Douman had given him, to summon spiritual disasters and cover their retreat. In the end he was killed by Shaver, before he could carry it out.

== Twin Horn Syndicate/Bicornis Fellowship ==
=== Takiko Sōma ===
Sōma Takiko (相馬 多軌子)

Voiced by: Hisako Kanemoto (Japanese); Felecia Angelle (English)

A mysterious girl who appears for the first time in the 15th episode, in front of the Heavenly Altar. Takiko affirms she is a student, but Harutora, Natsume and Touji have never seen her or heard her name, despite her seeming to know them. Later it is revealed that she was disguised as Atsune Hirata and has acted as a double agent between Twin Horn and Onmyo Agency's Magic Crime Investigation Division. She is the last remaining direct member of the Souma family who are implied have royal origins, as well as being a shrine maiden. The Souma Clan along with Kurahashi Clan stood on top of the world of Onmyoudo together with the Tsuchimikado Clan during World War II and supported the Tsuchimikado's through their control of military. However, when Japan lost the war they all but disappeared.

While she is one of older members of the Twin Horn Syndicate, Takiko consider herself differently from the current Yakou Disciples because she seeks to fulfill his will and ideals which the organization was founded on. She is secretly allied with Genji Kurahashi to achieve this desire, and to cleanse the Twin Horn Syndicate of its mindless fanatical elements by awakening Yakou within Natsume.

=== Shidō Dairenji ===
Dairenji Shidou (大連寺 至道)

Voiced by: Takahiro Sakurai (Japanese); Todd Haberkorn (English)

The former head of the Twin Horn Syndicate/Bicornis Fellowship, and the Imperial Household's Lingering Spirit Division. He used himself as a core to trigger the spiritual disaster two years prior to the story. In the end, he became an ogre (demon) and progressed into Phase 4-scale Phenomena, but later died of unknown causes. He is the father of the Divine General, Suzuka Dairenji. When he was alive he was a Divine General nicknamed the "Professor".

In episode 17 it is later learned his original family name was actually "Souma" and Dairenji was just another House that he married into (his wife's family name), thus implying blood relations with Takiko. Takiko revived him as Yase-Doji (Imperial Pallbearer: a type of Ogre shikigami) to serve her as her Shikigami. His memories of his previous life were kept intact and while he gained a great power that surpassed his previous life. He too modified his appearance appearing younger so as to match Takiko's 'taste'. As Takiko's Shikigami, his Yase-doji contract name is Yashamaru.

=== Chihiro Mutobe ===
Mutobe Chihiro (六人部 千尋)

Voiced by: Junichi Suwabe (Japanese); David Wald (English)

He was the right-hand man of Shidou Dairenji who also worked for the Spirit Division whilst a member of Twin Horn. Two years after the first Spiritual Terrorism, he tried to conduct a catastrophic event of similar scale with the assistance of Douman. Before going into custody with Zenjirou Kogure, he died due to a death curse spell which he placed on himself prior to the incident. Takiko revived him as Yase-Doji to serve her as her Shikigami along with Shidou. His memories of his previous life were kept intact and he gained a great power that surpassed any he had in his previous life. He too modified his appearance, appearing younger so as to match Takiko's 'taste'. As Takiko's Shikigami, his Yase-Doji contract name is Kumomaru.

=== Yoshitaka Makihara ===
Makihara Yoshitaka (牧原 義隆)

Voiced by: Tsuguo Mogami (Japanese); Vic Mignogna (English)

One of the leaders of the degraded fanatical faction of the Twin Horn Syndicate. He and his cohorts within the Onmyo Agency were the ones behind attempts at kidnapping Natsume and participated in Spiritual Terrorism prior to the story. Makihara and his men tried to escape the crackdown from the Magical Investigators by once again manipulating spirit pulses to cause another spiritual disaster. He was shot dead by, and had his memories erased by, Hirata. Makihara was good friends with Chihiro Mutobe and Etou.

== The Tsuchimikado Clan ==
=== Yakou Tsuchimikado ===
Tsuchimikado Yakō (土御門 夜光)

Voiced by: Ryotaro Okiayu (Japanese); Clifford Chapin (English)

A genius Onmyoji and visionary, Yakou had appeared in the midst of the Great Pacific War and would be known as the father of modern Onmyoudo. It was through his actions that the art of Onmyoudo was able to revitalize itself in Japan by creating a new foundation, attaining him fame as well as many followers. A key figure in the Japanese Imperial Army, his leadership in the Onmyo Agency won the military and the country many victories. However it would also be he who caused the Great Spiritual Disaster which brought about country's immediate downfall in the war. Despite the controversy that had arisen surrounding him in the aftermath of this, his legacy is still enormously respected and revered. Little is known of what happen to him afterwards, but there are many who theorize that Yakou's grand ritual may not have necessarily failed and that he actually has undergone reincarnation. These theories and rumors, further fueled by divination, predicted that Yakou would incarnate himself half a century later to the next head of the Tsuchimikado household whom his powers have blossomed in; then he will once again raise up and lead the Onmyouji to a new era. Many of those who are strongly devoted to him refer to Yakou as the King of North Star/Polaris King.

=== Yasuzumi Tsuchimikado ===
Tsuchimikado Yasuzumi (土御門 泰純)

Voiced by: Shō Hayami (Japanese); Robert McCollum (English)

The current head of the Tsuchimikado clan and Natsume's father, he can read the stars and predict the future accurately. In Volume 8 of the light novel, it was revealed that he had given his son to a branch family to safeguard, and had Natsume take his place, meaning he is the biological father of Harutora.

=== Takahiro Tsuchimikado ===
Tsuchimikado Takahiro (土御門 鷹寛)

Voiced by: Tomoyuki Shimura (Japanese); Mike McFarland (English)

Harutora's father, a doctor who is currently treating Touji, is a First Class Mystical Investigator in the Onmyo Agency. He later left it, and now works as a doctor in the countryside. He is also a graduate from Onmyo Academy. It is later revealed he is not Harutora's real father.

=== Chizuru Tsuchimikado ===
Tsuchimikado Chizuru (土御門 千鶴)

Voiced by: Akeno Watanabe (Japanese); Rachel Robinson (English)

Harutora's mother and Takahiro's wife who used to be an Exorcist for the Onmyo Agency. She worked in the Akibabara branch, and was one of the top 5 most skilled members there. Known for her attitude, she is quite well liked among her peers. It is claimed that she went by many names such as "Ram of Akiba, Heavenly Bellie or Lady Thunder of the Flash, but in reality she was nicknamed the "Human Power Generator' due to how highly destructive her powers normally are. She specializes in Lightning manipulation. It is later revealed she is not Harutora's real mother.

== Others ==
=== Hokuto ===
Hokuto (北斗)

Voiced by: Hisako Kanemoto (Japanese); Tia Ballard (English)

Harutora's childhood friend. She had a romantic relationship with Harutora and got really jealous when Harutora was kissed by Suzuka. During his next encounter with Suzuka, she sacrifices herself to save Harutora from Suzuka's shikigami Tsuchigumo, revealing herself to be a shikigami. Hokuto is actually Natsume's shikigami, whom Natsume used as a medium to be close to Harutora. Hokuto's 'death' was one of the things that prompted Harutora to become Natsume's shikigami, but Harutora wanted to be her shikigami since they were kids when they made a promise. She shares her name with another Shikigami called Hokuto, a dragon. As Hokuto is Natsume she loved Harutora and Harutora has showed in multiple occurrences that he held deep feelings for her as well. (Technically, they loved each other through Hokuto).

=== Kon ===
Kon (コン)

Voiced by: Aki Toyosaki (Japanese); Monica Rial (English)

Harutora's shikigami. A diminutive silver-fox spirit who wears miko-like clothing and wields a wakizashi, Kon has served the Tsuchimikado clan for a long time. She has been by Harutora's side since the moment he became Natsume's shikigami, but due to his low spiritual power and awareness, he was unable to hear or see her. A rare Gohou-type shikigami, she possesses independent thought and actions and is fiercely loyal to her master, and even gets jealous when Harutora associates with other girls. Shortly before Harutora's awakening as Yakou, Kon reveals her true identity as Hishamaru, one of Yakou's two legendary familiars who had 'disappeared' after his death. Kon forcefully destroyed her 5 seals, restoring her true power and her appearance as Hishamaru. Her first seal hides both it and the other seals, the second seal hides her personality, the third seal her appearance, the fourth seal her power, and the final seals her memory.

=== Hishamaru ===
Hishamaru (飛車丸)

Voiced by: Yuko Kaida (Japanese); Monica Rial (English)

She, along with Kakugyouki, are the two powerful legendary shikigami of Yakou Tsuchimikado, who were constantly at his side and renowned enough to gain military rank in the Japanese Army during World War II. It is revealed in a short flashback that she has a familial connection to Yakou and is born into a branch family, thus explaining her position as Yakou's familiar. She apparently disappeared shortly after her master's disappearance; later, it is explained that she has been secretly waiting for Yakou's return. Kakugyouki considers her to be more loyal to Yakou than he is. Her faithfulness isn't just loyalty, but also her devoted feelings for Yakou because he approached her without fear and showed her kindness, commenting how cute she was when they first met.

=== Kakugyouki ===
Kakugyouki (角行鬼)

Voiced by: Hiroki Yasumoto (Japanese); Christopher R. Sabat (English)

One of Yakou's two powerful legendary Shikigami, who were constantly at his side and renowned enough to gain military rank in the Japanese Army during World War II. He apparently disappeared shortly after his master's disappearance. He is later shown to be very much alive and is now a wanderer. He has one arm missing, as seen at the end of episode 6. Kakugyouki states that he has no plans to get involved with the Yakou Cult (Twin Horn Syndicate) and remains neutral in conflict between them and the Onmyo Agency.

=== Suzu Saotome ===
Suzu Saotome (早乙女 涼, Saotome Suzu)

Voiced by: Izumi Kitta (Japanese); Lindsay Seidel (English)

A mysterious eccentric 3rd year student that people often mistake for being younger than she is. She likes little girls, despite appearing like one herself. She is actually Doman's familiar, even if she refers to herself as his "disciple". Her actual identity is that of infamous Ryou Saotome (pronounced Suzu), the leading Yakou researcher. She once worked for the Lingering Spirit Division, but left after a year. Along with being a graduate of Onmyo Prep, in her school days she was classmates with Jin Ohtomo and Zenjirou Kogure, forming the third member of Three Crows of 36th batch.

=== Doman Ashiya ===
Ashiya Dōman (蘆屋 道満)

Voiced by: Nobuo Tobita (Japanese); Michael Johnson (old), Austin Tindle (child) (English)

One of the most powerful onmyouji from Abe no Seimei's era. He was the rival of Abe no Seimei and fought him for nearly a thousand years ago. Ashiya Douman has shown interest in Yakou's reincarnation and seems to have connection with Twin Horn Syndicate/Bicornis Fellowship and Kakugyouki. He also fought with Jin Ohtomo, resulting in Jin losing his leg. Currently, he is no longer a human but a Phase 5 oni. He forces himself to stay as a Phase 3 because if he did become Phase 5, he would cease being 'Ashiya Douman'. He later agrees to become Jin's familiar.

=== Toshiya Dairenji ===
Dairenji Toshiya (大連寺 利矢)

Voiced by: Akiko Yajima (Japanese); Apphia Yu (English)

Suzuka's kind, but ill-fated, older brother who succumbed to his father's experiments and died prior to the story. Suzuka attempted to bring him back by trading her life for his using the Taizan Fukun Ritual. Her brother ends up returning as a shade. The shade then tries to kill Suzuka, but is stopped by Harutora. Once sealed and put to rest by Natsume, a distraught Suzuka and Harutora together bury him.
