= Clifford Chapin =

American voice actor (born 1988)

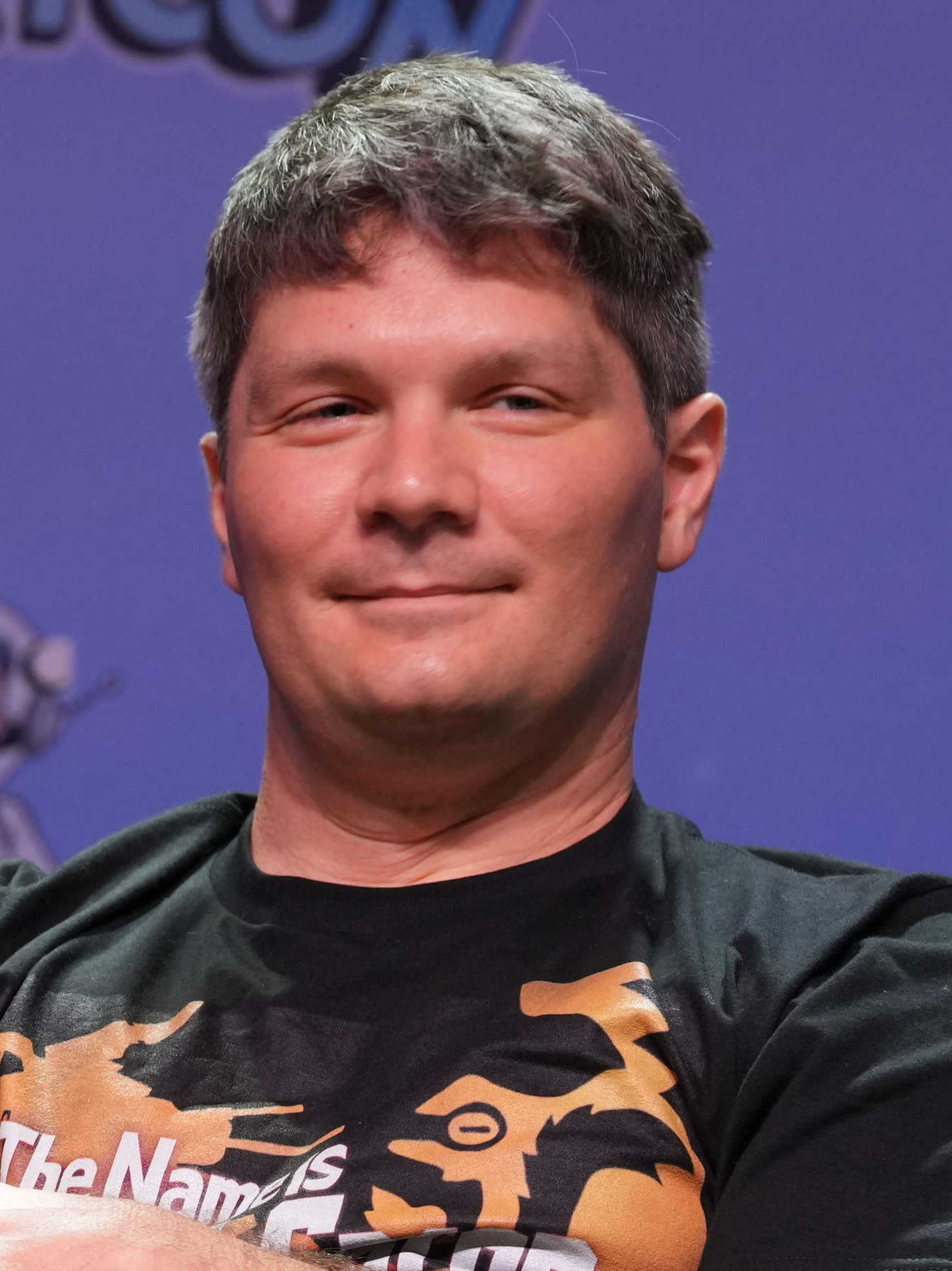
- Chapin in 2025
- Born: Clifford Samuel Chapin IV; January 29, 1988 (age 38); Griswold, Connecticut, U.S.
- Education: Hofstra University
- Occupations: Voice actor; voice director
- Years active: 2013–present
- Spouse: Kristen McGuire (m. 2021)
- Website: www.cliffordchapin.com

Clifford Samuel Chapin IV (born January 29, 1988) is an American voice actor and voice director.

== Career ==
Chapin is known for his roles in anime and video games. In 2014, Chapin landed the lead voice role of Raishin Akabane in Unbreakable Machine-Doll. In 2015, he voiced the lead character Harutora Tsuchimikado in Tokyo Ravens. Chapin's other voice roles include Katsuki Bakugo in My Hero Academia, Conny Springer in Attack on Titan, Kirito Kamui in Psycho-Pass, Himmel the Hero in Frieren: Beyond Journey’s End, Ryusui Nanami in Dr. Stone, and Hideyoshi Nagachika in Tokyo Ghoul.

== Personal life ==
On June 18, 2021, Chapin was announced to be engaged to voice actress Kristen McGuire. The couple have since been married.

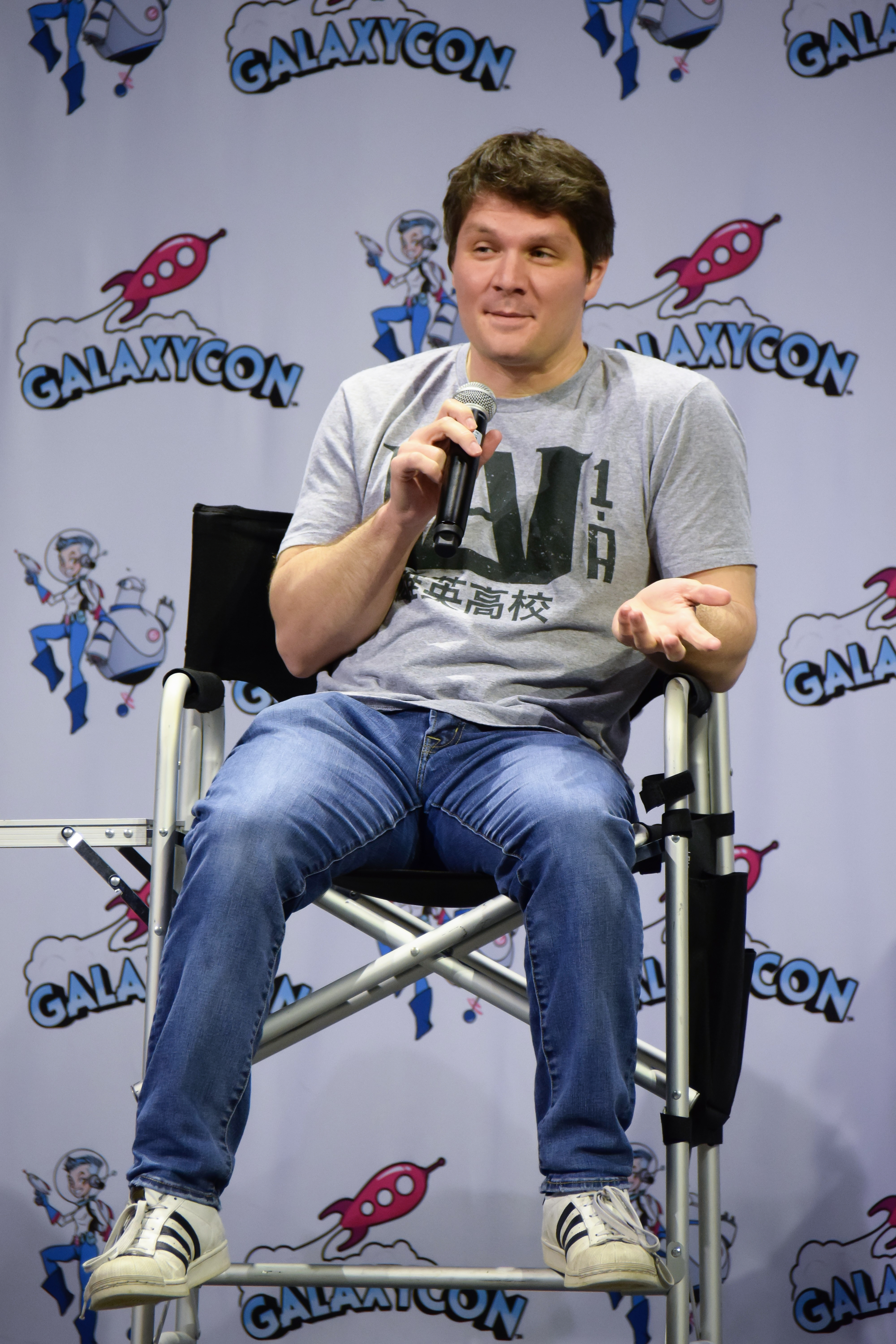
Clifford Chapin (Bakugo) at GalaxyCon Richmond 2020

== Filmography ==
=== Anime ===
List of English dubbing performances in anime
Year	Title	Role	Notes	Source
2013–2023	Attack on Titan	Connie Springer		
2014	Good Luck Girl!	Keita Tsuwabuki		
2014	Jormungand: Perfect Order	Howe		Facebook
2014	Robotics;Notes	Kaito Yashio		
2014	Red Data Girl	Ichijō Takayanagi		
2014	A Certain Scientific Railgun S	Kenji Madarame		
2014	A Certain Magical Index II	Shiage Hamazura	Ep. 24	
2014	Psycho-Pass 2	Kirito Kamui		
2014	Black Butler	Charles Grey	Season 3, OVA 1–2, and Book of the Atlantic	
2014	Laughing Under the Clouds	Mutsuki Ashiya		
2015	Ben-To	Heracles	Eps. 11-12	
2015	Death Parade	Shimada (Teen)	Ep. 8	
2015	Tokyo Ghoul √A	Hideyoshi Nagachika		
2015	The Rolling Girls	Tomoki Suzuka, Garm	Assistant ADR Director	
2015	World Break: Aria of Curse for a Holy Swordsman	Moroha Haimura		
2015	Unbreakable Machine-Doll	Raishin Akabane		
2015	Yona of the Dawn	Yun	ADR Director (Ep. 1–12); Assistant ADR Director (Ep. 13–24)	
2015	Tokyo Ravens	Harutora Tsuchimikado		
2015	D-Frag!	Naganuma		
2015	Seraph of the End	Yūji	Eps. 2-3	
2015	Ultimate Otaku Teacher	Joe Odawara	ADR Script Writer	
2015	The Heroic Legend of Arslan	Xandes		
2015	Mikagura School Suite	Usamaru		Tweet
2015	Ping Pong: The Animation	Shūji Nekota		
2015	Free! - Eternal Summer	Takuya Uozumi		
2015	Gangsta.	Mikhail		
2015	Prison School	Shingo Wakamoto		
2015	WIXOSS series	Ayumu Kominato	also selector spread WIXOSS	
2015	Noragami Aragoto	Kōto Fujisaki		
2015	Heavy Object	Charles	Ep. 17	
2015	Daimidaler the Sound Robot		ADR Director	
2015	Riddle Story of Devil		ADR Script Writer	
2015	Show By Rock!!	Gashigashi	Ep. 7	
2015, 2017	Assassination Classroom	Tomohito Sugino	also Koro-sensei Q!	
2016	Snow White with the Red Hair	Mihaya		Tweet
2016	Lord Marksman and Vanadis	Zion Thenardier		
2016	Prince of Stride: Alternative	Hozumi Kohinata		
2016	Grimgar of Fantasy and Ash	Ranta	Replacing Orion Pitts in Ep. 10	
2016	Divine Gate	Ariton	ADR Director	
2016	Fairy Tail Zero	Yuri Dreyar		
2016	Kamisama Kiss		ADR Script Writer, season 2	
2016	Tokyo ESP	Masaki Shindō		
2016	Dimension W	Lwai-Aura-Tibesti		
2016	Black Butler: Book of Circus	Charles Grey		
2016	Garo: Crimson Moon	Raikō		
2016	And You Thought There Is Never a Girl Online?	Yuyun		
2016	Puzzle & Dragons X	Tiger		
2016	Servamp	Mahiru Shirota		
2016	Cheer Boys!!	Gen Hasegawa		
2016	Planetarian		ADR Director	
2016	Barakamon	Hiroshi Kido		
2016	Monster Hunter Stories: Ride On	Den-Den Kometa		
2016	Touken Ranbu: Hanamaru	Yamanbagiri Kunihiro		
2016	Hetalia: The World Twinkle	Kugelmugel		
2016	Overlord	Peter Mork		
2016	Chaos Dragon	Sol	ADR Script Writer	
2016	Alderamin on the Sky	Kusa		
2016	Brothers Conflict		ADR Director	
2016	Castle Town Dandelion		ADR Director	
2016	Garo: The Animation	Marco	Ep. 18	
2016	Keijo!!!!!!!!		ADR Director	
2016	One Piece	Haruta, Vinsmoke Yonji	Funimation dub	
2016	Shōnen Maid	Kōji Hino	Ep. 7	
2016	The Vision of Escaflowne	Gatty	Funimation dub	
2016	World War Blue	Til		
2016	Yuri on Ice	Honda		Facebook
2016–2025	My Hero Academia	Katsuki Bakugo	Assistant ADR Director	
2017	Akiba's Trip: The Animation	Masuto Nīkura	ADR Director	
2017	Masamune-kun's Revenge	Eiji	Eps. 2, 4	
2017	Chain Chronicle: The Light of Haecceitas	Kain		
2017	Akashic Records of Bastard Magic Instructor	Ars		
2017	Alice & Zouroku	Ichirō Hayashi	Eps. 2–3, 6, ADR Director	
2017	Sakura Quest	Yukiya Amamiya	Eps. 12-13	
2017	Gosick	Yasuhiro Kujō	Eps. 1–2, ADR Director	
2017	New Game!	Spider Red	Ep. 9, ADR Director	
2017	Gamers!	Tasuku Uehara		
2017	Ushio and Tora	Akabane, Baldanders, Kuroka, Satoru Moritsuna	Sentai Filmworks debut	
2017	Juni Taisen: Zodiac War	Nagayuki Tsumita/Dragon		
2017	Konohana Kitan	Urinosuke	ADR Director	
2017	Genocidal Organ	Alex	ADR Director	
2017	All Out!!	Shinsuke Futami		
2017	Clockwork Planet	Hannes	Ep. 1	
2017	Hundred		ADR Director	
2017	Recovery of an MMO Junkie		ADR Director	Tweet
2017	King's Game The Animation	Takuya Sakamoto	ADR Director	
2017–2018	Dragon Ball Super	Cabba	Funimation dub	
2018	Ace Attorney	Acro		
2018	Cardcaptor Sakura: Clear Card	Toya Kinomoto		
2018	The Legend of the Galactic Heroes: Die Neue These	Siegfried Kircheis	ADR Director	
2018	Basilisk: The Ōka Ninja Scrolls	Higurashi Shichigen		
2018	Death March to the Parallel World Rhapsody	Urs	Ep. 3	
2018	Hakyu Hoshin Engi	Ko Tenka		
2018	Junji Ito Collection	Kota Kawai		
2018	Pop Team Epic	Daichi Taira	Ep. 1	
2018	Darling in the Franxx		ADR Director	
2018	Chio's School Road	Chop, George the Cat		
2018	How Not to Summon a Demon Lord	Emile Bichelberger		
2018–19	SSSS.Gridman		ADR Director	Tweet
2018–present	Black Clover	Langris Vaude		
2019	That Time I Got Reincarnated as a Slime	Yuuki Kagurazaka	ADR Director	
2019	Mix	Soichiro Tachibana		
2019	Kawaikereba Hentai demo Suki ni Natte Kuremasuka?	Keiki Kiryū		
2019	Neon Genesis Evangelion	Kaworu Nagisa	Netflix dub	Tweet
2019	Radiant	Sagramore		
2019–present	Date A Live	Hiroto Tonomachi		
2021	The Duke of Death and His Maid	Duke of Death		
2021	Bofuri	Payne		
2021	The World Ends with You: The Animation	Yoshiya "Joshua" Kiryu		
2021	2.43: Seiin High School Boys Volleyball Team	Shinichiro Oda	Supervising ADR Director	
2021–22	JoJo's Bizarre Adventure: Stone Ocean	Romeo Jisso		
2022	Trapped in a Dating Sim: The World of Otome Games Is Tough for Mobs	Greg		
2022	Shikimori's Not Just a Cutie	Inuzuka		
2022	Kaguya-sama: Love Is War	Miyuki Shirogane	Season 3; Replaces Aaron Dismuke	
2022	The Slime Diaries: That Time I Got Reincarnated as a Slime	Gobzo	ADR Director	
2022	Dr. Stone	Ryusui Nanami	From Dr. Stone: Ryusui special to Season 4 ADR Director (Seasons 1–2)	Tweet
2022	Spy × Family	Keith Kepler		
2022	Summer Ghost	Ryo		
2022	Lucifer and the Biscuit Hammer	Mikazuki Shinonome		
2022	Blue Lock	Tabito Karasu		
2023	Food Wars! Shokugeki no Soma	Asahi Nakiri	Season 5	
2023	The Iceblade Sorcerer Shall Rule the World	Evi Armstrong		
2023	The Great Cleric	Sekiroth		
2023	Frieren: Beyond Journey's End	Himmel	Season 1-present	
2024	Mission: Yozakura Family	Shinzo Yozakura	Hulu dub	
2024	Digimon Adventure: Our War Game!	Additional Voices		
2024	Digimon Adventure 02: Digimon Hurricane Touchdown!! / Transcendent Evolution! The Golden Digimentals	Male Bandmember 3A, Additional Voices		
2024	Rurouni Kenshin: Kyoto Disturbance	Arai Shakkū, Gi'ichi		
2026	Fate/strange Fake	Jester Karture		
2026	Nippon Sangoku	Yasuke Hei		

=== Animation ===
List of voice performances in animation
Year	Title	Role	Notes	Source
2017	RWBY	Shay D. Mann	Volume 5	

=== Live action dubbing ===
List of voice performances in live action dubbing
Year	Title	Role	Notes	Source
2014	Rurouni Kenshin: Kyoto Inferno	Sawagejō Chō		
2023	Ultraman Blazar	Earth Garon		

=== Video games ===
List of voice performances in video games
Year	Title	Role	Notes	Source
2013	Yousei	David Sawicki		Facebook
2014	Smite	Kukulkan		Press
2014	Borderlands: The Pre-Sequel!	Lost Legion Jetfighter, Dying Scientist #3, Worm-Brained Boil		
2015	Dragon Ball Xenoverse	Time Patroller		
2016	Battleborn	Toby		
2016	Dragon Ball Xenoverse 2	Time Patroller, Cabba (DLC)		
2018	YIIK: A Postmodern RPG	Michael K.		
2018	Dragon Ball Legends	Cabba		
2019	Borderlands 3	Various voices		
2019	Lost Ark	Thirain		
2020	Genshin Impact	Chubby, Niwa, Ronin, Nobushi: Jintouban, Nobushi: Hitsukeban, Nobushi: Kikouban		
2021	Tales of Luminaria	Falk		
2022	Fire Emblem Warriors: Three Hopes	Additional voices		
2022	Tiny Tina's Wonderlands	Happy Buddy Ball		
2022	River City Girls 2	Beeboo, Pop, Sonny Lee, Yakuza		
2023	Octopath Traveler II	Additional voices		
2024	Zenless Zone Zero	Billy Kid		
2024	Romancing SaGa 2: Revenge of the Seven	James/Light Infantry (M)		
2025	Dynasty Warriors: Origins	Ling Tong		
2026	Final Fantasy Resonance	Rain		
