= Shōga =

Shōga (生姜) is the Japanese word for ginger and can refer to:

- Gari (ginger), also called sushi ginger
- Beni shōga, a type of Japanese pickle
- Pork shogayaki, a Japanese dish with sliced pork and ginger

See also:

- Kuchi shōga, a Japanese phonetic system for 'pronouncing' the sounds of drums
- Shogaol, a chemical found in ginger
