= Nishi-Ogikubo =

Human settlement in Japan

Nishi-Ogikubo (西荻窪; Japanese pronunciation: [ɲi.ɕi.o.ɡʲiꜜ.kɯ.bo, -o.ŋʲiꜜ-, -oꜜ.ɡʲi-, -oꜜ.ŋʲi-]), or Nishiogi (西荻; [ɲi.ɕi.o.ɡʲi, -ŋʲi]) for short, is a residential area around Nishi-Ogikubo Station within Suginami Ward of Tokyo in Japan. It is located west of Ogikubo, and further divided into five Streets (chōme) in the neighbourhood of Nishiogi-Kita (西荻北) and four Streets in the neighbourhood of Nishiogi-Minami (西荻南). It limits with the neighborhoods Zenpukuji to the north, Kamiogi and Minami-Ogikubo to the east, Miyamae to the south, and Shōan to the west. It also limits with the Kichijōji neighborhood in the city of Musashino to the west. Historically it formed the unitary village of Kami-Ogikubo together with the modern-day Kamiogi neighborhood of Suginami Ward.

== Characteristics ==
The area has Nishi-Ogikubo Station serving the JR Chūō and Sōbu lines. The neighbourhood is primarily residential, and is known to have a high concentration of shops specialised in antique curiosas and second-hand books, as well as establishments that play live music.

Near Nishiogikubo station, the headquarters of the Japanese animation studio Khara, mostly known for its work on the Rebuild Of Evangelion anime series, is located.

== Neighbouring municipalities ==
- Musashino City
- Mitaka City
- Nerima Ward

== Major institutions ==
- Ōmiya-mae Kasuga Jinja (shrine)
- Nishiogikita municipal library
- Igusa Hachimangu (shrine)
- Tokyo Woman's Christian University
- Sekine public swimming pool
- Tokyo Aviation College
- Ogikubo Junior High School
