= Nishi-Ogikubo Station =

Railway station in Tokyo, Japan

Coordinates: 35.704°N 139.599°E

JC10 JB03 Nishi-Ogikubo Station 西荻窪駅
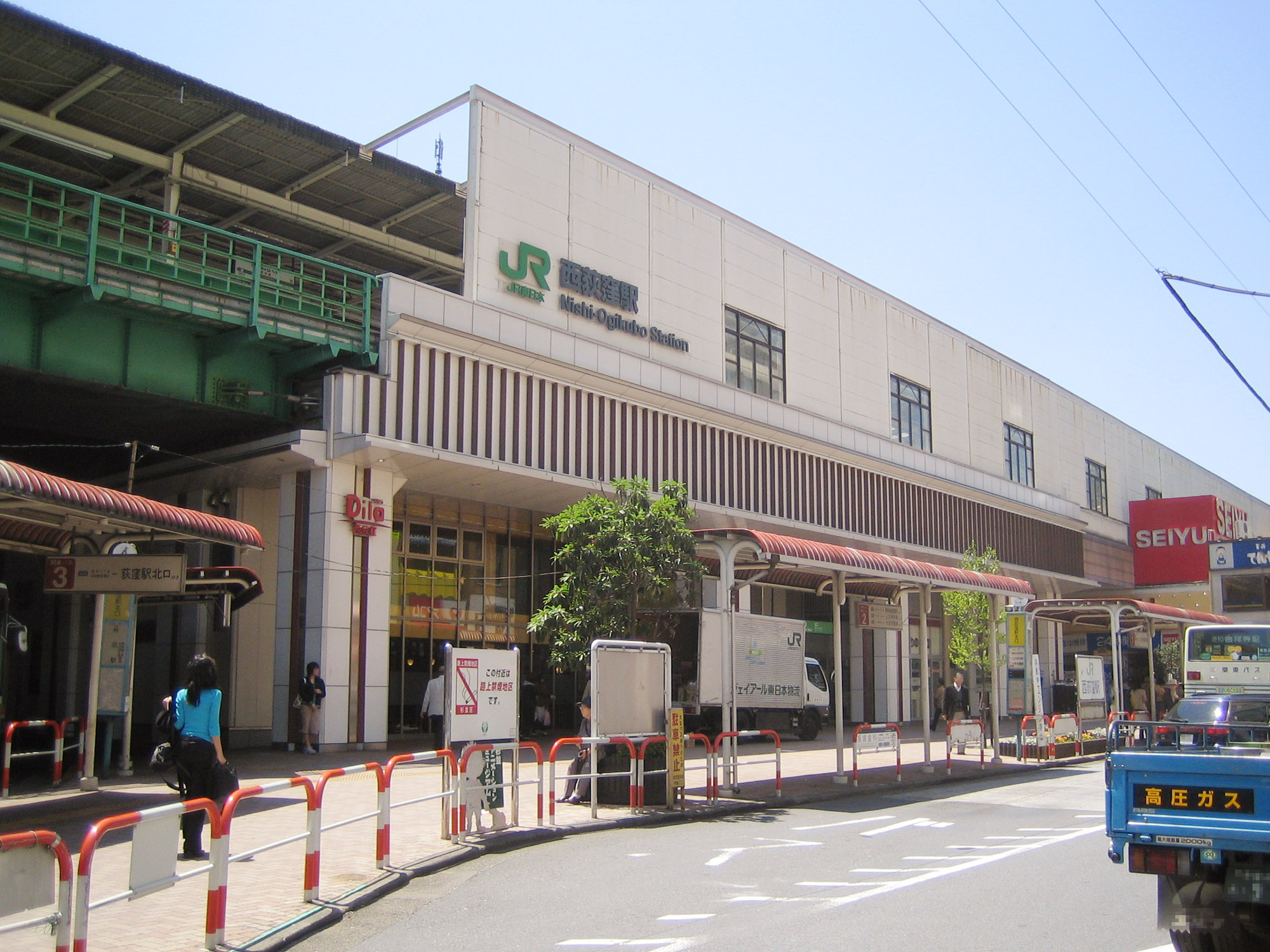
- North side

General information
- Location: 3 Nishi-ogiminami, Suginami, Tokyo （東京都杉並区西荻南3丁目） Japan
- Operator: JR East
- Lines: Chūō Line (Rapid), Chuo-Sobu Line

History
- Opened: 1922

Passengers
- FY2024: 85,340 (daily)

Services
Preceding station	JR East	Following station
Kichijōji JC11 towards Ōtsuki	Chūō Line Rapid (weekdays)	Ogikubo JC09 towards Tokyo
Kichijōji JB02 towards Mitaka	Chūō–Sōbu Line	Ogikubo JB04 towards Chiba
Kichijōji JB02 towards Mitaka	Chūō–Sōbu Line via Tōzai Line	Ogikubo JB04 towards Tsudanuma
Location

Nishi-Ogikubo Station (西荻窪駅, Nishi-Ogikubo-eki) is a railway station on the Chūō Main Line in Suginami, Tokyo, Japan, operated by East Japan Railway Company (JR East).

== Lines ==
Nishi-Ogikubo Station is served by the Chūō Line (Rapid) and Chūō-Sōbu Line.

== Station layout ==
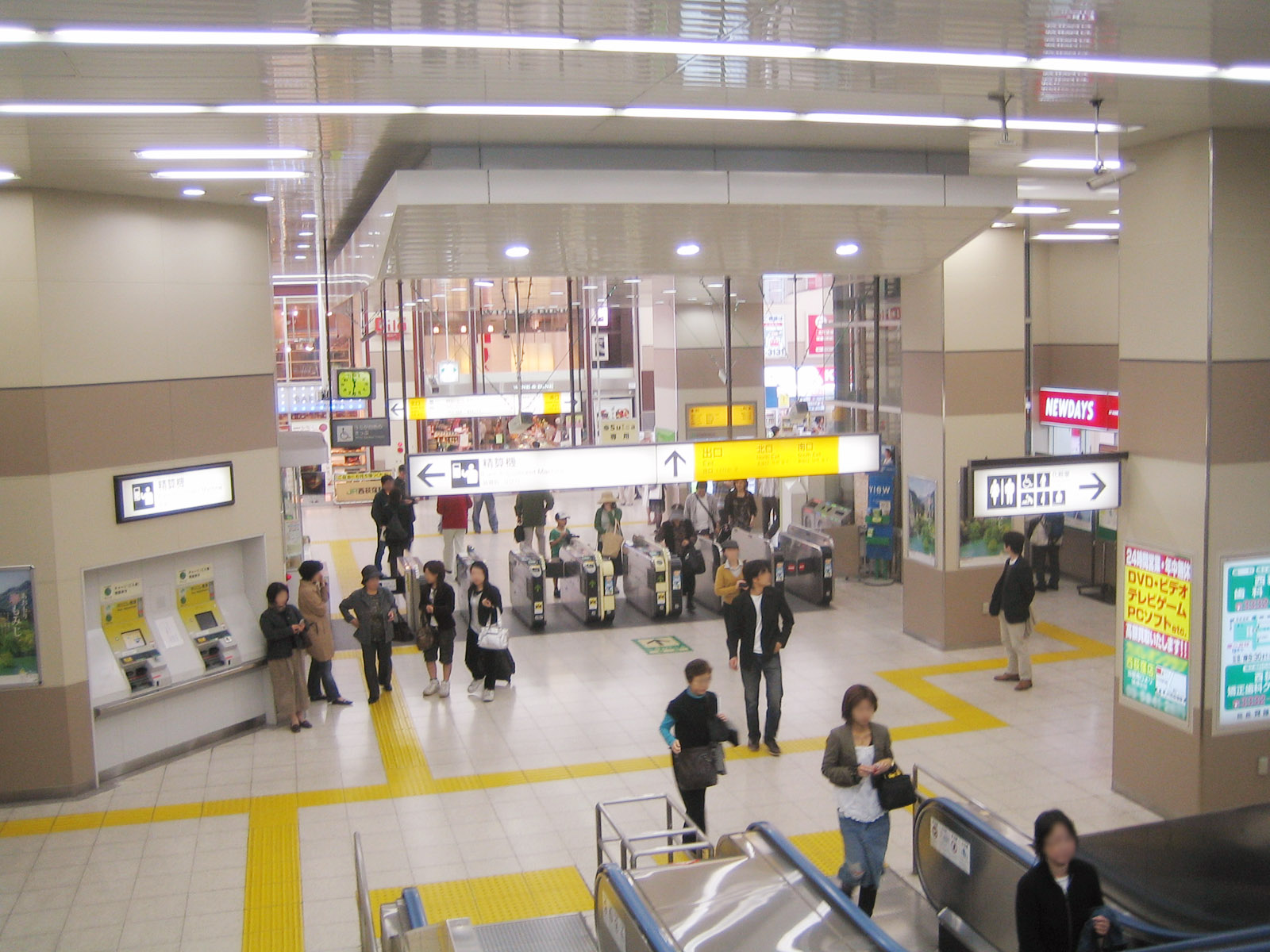
Concourse

The station has a "Midori no Madoguchi" staffed ticket office.

=== Platforms ===
1	Chūō-Sōbu Line	for Mitaka
2	Chūō-Sōbu Line	for Shinjuku, Akihabara, and Chiba
3	Chūō Line (Rapid)	for Tachikawa, Hachiōji, and Takao
4	Chūō Line (Rapid)	for Nakano, Shinjuku, and Tokyo

== History ==
The station opened on 15 July 1922. With the privatization of JNR on 1 April 1987, the station came under the control of JR East.

== Surrounding area ==
The neighbourhoods surrounding the station are characterised by narrow streets. It is primarily a residential area, with a high concentration of shops specialising in antiques and old books.

== See also ==
- List of railway stations in Japan
