= Pork shōgayaki =

Japanese pork dish

Pork shogayaki
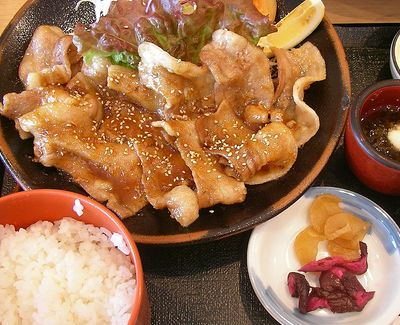
- Ginger Grilled Pork meal
- Associated cuisine: Japan
- Serving temperature: Hot or cold
- Main ingredients: Pork, ginger, soy sauce and mirin
- Ingredients generally used: Onion, garlic, sugar

Pork shōgayaki (豚の生姜焼き, buta no shōgayaki) is a dish in Japanese cuisine. Shōga (生姜) means ginger, and yaki (焼き) means grill or fry. It can also be made with beef, but the pork version is so much more popular that the term "shōgayaki" generally refers only to pork in Japan. It is the second most popular Japanese pork dish after tonkatsu. It can also be made with chicken, although not sliced as thinly as the pork and beef versions.

It consists of thin slices of lean pork, browned in the pan, and then briefly braised in a sauce of grated ginger, soy sauce and mirin. Grated onion and garlic can be added for the extra zest, and additional sugar is sometimes used to round out the taste.

Shōgayaki is a common addition to bento boxes, as it can be eaten cold. However, it is more commonly served hot with rice and shredded cabbage.
