= Tokyo Ravens =

Japanese light novel series and its adaptations

- Cover of the first light novel Shaman*Clan

東京レイヴンズ (Tōkyō Reivunzu)
- Genre: Action, supernatural
- Light novel
- Written by: Kōhei Azano
- Illustrated by: Sumihei
- Published by: Fujimi Shobo
- Imprint: Fujimi Fantasia Bunko
- Original run: May 20, 2010 – present
- Volumes: 17 + 4 EX
- Manga
- Written by: Atsushi Suzumi
- Published by: Kadokawa Shoten
- English publisher: NA: Kadokawa
- Magazine: Shōnen Ace
- Original run: April 26, 2010 – July 26, 2017
- Volumes: 15
- Anime television series
- Directed by: Takaomi Kanasaki
- Produced by: Kazuhiro Kanemitsu; Michio Kaiba; Mitsutoshi Ogura; Nobue Osamu; Saki Kondo
- Written by: Hideyuki Kurata
- Music by: Maiko Iuchi
- Studio: Eight Bit
- Licensed by: Crunchyroll: SA/SEA: Medialink
- Original network: Tokyo MX, Sun TV, KBS, tvk, TV Aichi, AT-X, BS11
- English network: SEA: Animax Asia
- Original run: October 9, 2013 – March 26, 2014
- Episodes: 24
- icon

Tokyo Ravens (東京レイヴンズ, Tōkyō Reivunzu) is a Japanese light novel series written by Kōhei Azano and illustrated by Sumihei. It was adapted into a manga series in 2010. It received an anime series on October 9, 2013 and ended on March 26, 2014. Funimation simulcasted the series on their website.

== Plot ==
Onmyodou magic was a powerful technique which was used by the Japanese during World War I. Later, the infamous Yakou Tsuchimikado performed a ritual known as the "Taizan Fukun Ritual", which will eventually bring out Japan as a formidable force. However, the ritual goes horribly wrong and the result of this becomes what is now known as the "Great Spiritual Disaster", an incident which haunts the entire Japanese continent to date. In addition to this, the Onmyo Agency was established to monitor supernatural activity in the area and to combat any spirits or demons that would make their way into the real world.

In the present day, onmyodou has become more refined, simplified and modernised, even finding its use in the fields of medicine and technology. But not everyone is capable of affording this power, as can be seen in the case of Harutora, a member of one of the Tsuchimikado's branch families, who was born with no spiritual power. Despite being born to a distinguished onmyoji family, his life has become meaningless as he can accomplish nothing without any spiritual power. But he does remember the fact about him making a promise with his engaged childhood friend Natsume, the Tsuchimikado's family heir and Yakou's supposed reincarnation. Despite his background, living a normal and peaceful life is all Harutora ever wanted. But when a group of people from the Onmyo Agency attempt to recreate the same tragedy that led to Japan's downfall two years ago, he decides to take matters into his own hands by fighting alongside Natsume as her shikigami (supporter).

== Media ==
=== Light novels ===
Tokyo Ravens began as a series of light novels by Kōhei Azano, author of Black Blood Brothers, with illustrations by Sumihei; 17 volumes have been released as of March 2025. In March 2025, Azano announced that the series is planned to end with the release of its 18th volume. The first volume of a side-story series titled Tokyo Ravens EX was published on July 20, 2013; four volumes have been released as of October 2016.

==== Volumes ====
No.	Title	Japanese release date	Japanese ISBN
1	SHAMAN*CLAN	May 20, 2010	978-4-8291-3519-8
2	RAVEN's NEST	September 9, 2010	978-4-8291-3552-5
3	cHImAirA DanCE	December 18, 2010	978-4-8291-3592-1
4	GIRL RETURN & days in nest I	May 20, 2011	978-4-8291-3637-9
5	days in nest II & GIRL AGAIN	July 20, 2011	978-4-8291-3657-7
6	Black Shaman ASSAULT	October 20, 2011	978-4-8291-3688-1
7	_DARKNESS_EMERGE_	May 19, 2012	978-4-8291-3757-4
8	over-cry	October 20, 2012	978-4-8291-3809-0
9	to The DarkSky	March 19, 2013	978-4-8291-3865-6
10	BEGINS/TEMPLE	October 19, 2013	978-4-0471-2911-5
11	change:unchange	April 19, 2014	978-4-0407-0087-8
12	Junction of STARs	November 20, 2014	978-4-0407-0139-4
13	COUNT>DOWN	March 20, 2015	978-4-0407-0087-8
14	EMPEROR.ADVENT	December 19, 2015	978-4-0407-0525-5
15	ShamaniC DawN	September 20, 2017	978-4-0407-0526-2
16	[RE]incarnation	October 20, 2018	978-4-0407-2729-5
17	REsiSTANCE	March 19, 2025	978-4-04-073375-3
18	SHAMAN*TALE	January 20, 2027	978-4-04-073375-3
EX1	party in nest	July 20, 2013	978-4-8291-3909-7
EX2	seasons in nest	February 20, 2014	978-4-0407-0030-4
EX3	memories in nest	September 19, 2015	978-4-0407-0523-1
EX4	twelve shamans	August 20, 2016	978-4-04-072057-9

=== Manga ===
Tokyo Ravens inspired the creation of six manga series based on the light novels. The first one, Tokyo Ravens, was illustrated by Atsushi Suzumi. It was serialsed from April 26, 2010, to July 26, 2017, in Monthly Shōnen Ace. The chapters have been collected into fifteen volumes. It follows the main story of the light novels. In 2014 and 2015, Kadokawa published eleven English volumes of the manga adaptation on BookWalker, their official eBook store. The second manga series, Tokyo Ravens: Tokyo Fox was illustrated by COMTA and published in Fujimi Shobo's Age premium in 2011. It features an original story focused on Kon. The third series, Tokyo Ravens: Red and White, is a manga spinoff by Azumi Mochizuki. It was serialized in Kadokawa's Monthly Dragon Age and concluded in the November 2013 issue. The fourth series, Tokyo Ravens: Sword of Song, is a manga spinoff by Ran Kuze. Its serialization began in the November 2013 issue of Kodansha's Monthly Shōnen Rival. The fifth series, Tokyo Ravens -Girls Photograph-, which focuses on the series' female characters, started serialization in Kadokawa's Monthly Dragon Age in the January 2014 issue. The sixth and the latest series, Tokyo Ravens AnotherXHoliday, which focuses on the series' male characters, started in Kadokawa's shojo magazine Millefeui in the February 2014 issue.

=== Anime ===
An anime adaption aired in Japan from October 6, 2013, to March 26, 2014, animated by Eight Bit, directed by Takaomi Kansaki, and with screenplay by Hideyuki Kurata. Funimation has licensed the series for English release. Medialink licensed the series in Asia-Pacific. The first opening theme is "X-encounter" by Maon Kurosaki and the first ending theme is "Kimi ga Emu Yūgure" (君が笑む夕暮れ) by Yoshino Nanjō. The second opening theme is "~Outgrow~" by Gero and the second ending theme is "Break a spell" by Mami Kawada.

==== Episodes ====
No.	Title	Original air date
1	"SHAMAN*CLAN -Promise-" "SHĀMAN*KURAN -Yakusoku-" (SHAMAN*CLAN -約束-)	October 9, 2013
Harutora Tsuchimikado recalls his childhood promise while sleeping during summer school before he and his friend Touji Ato encounter Hokuto. Idling away the day, Hokuto lectures Harutora once again to become an onmyo mage. On his way home, Harutora unexpectedly meets his childhood friend Natsume but ends up offending her prompting Natsume to leave. The next day, Touji enlightens Harutora on Natsume's comments before they meet up with Hokuto at the festival. Hokuto promises Harutora a kiss if he wins but teasingly plays it off but promises to take care of the ribbon. Suzuka Dairenji arrives at the festival while Harutora fights with Hokuto about her ema. Before Harutora can chase her, Suzuka enters and, mistakenly thinking Harutora is Natsume, asks him to help her with a certain ritual she wants to perform. The Magical Investigation Bureau drives up to take Suzuka into custody for use of forbidden magic but she utilizes an Asura to wash them away capturing Harutora in the process. When Hokuto arrives revealing Harutora's real identity, Suzuka leaves Hokuto with a message for Natsume and kisses him.
2	"SHAMAN*CLAN -Confession-" "SHĀMAN*KURAN -Kokuhaku-" (SHAMAN*CLAN -告白-)	October 16, 2013
Hokuto indirectly reveals she loves Harutora but avoids him for the next day. Touji discusses what Suzuka wanted with Harutora before he is called away to meet Natsume wherein Suzuka's familiar (which was inside Harutora's stomach after she kissed him) steals Natsume's spiritual powers. While taking Natsume home, Harutora comes across Suzuka and leaves Natsume to an officer while he goes to Suzuka. Overpowered by Suzuka's juggernaut, the Magical Investigation Bureau agents are spiritually wiped out before Harutora is almost able to convince Suzuka to stop. A badly injured Magic Investigation Department agent binds Suzuka who, enraged, calls upon her juggernaut to kill him. Harutora saves the agent's life but as he is about to die, Hokuto sacrifices herself to save Harutora. Alone and grieving over Hokuto's death, Harutora makes his way to Natsume and becomes her familiar.
3	"SHAMAN*CLAN -Calling the Dead(Tama Night Crawling)-" "SHĀMAN*KURAN -Tamayobai-" (SHAMAN*CLAN -魂呼(たまよばい)-)	October 23, 2013
Natsume and Harutora make their way to the shrine by riding Yukikage (a familiar in the form of a white horse) to stop Suzuka but she retaliates by sending her juggernaut and Asura. As the juggernaut forms a protective barrier around the shrine, Natsume and Harutora battle the two while Harutora develops a strategy to overcome the latter. In the midst of the battle, Harutora falls off Yukikage and Natsume calls out for Hokuto, the Tsuchimikado family's guardian dragon, to save him. Hokuto defeats the Asura and successfully delays the juggernaut enabling Harutora and Natsume to arrive at the shrine but Suzuka stops them. Suzuka ultimately brings forth a spirit pulse which is controlling her brother's body and is now strangling her. Harutora and Natsume eventually save Suzuka whereupon Harutora lets Suzuka see her brother off properly. Afterwards, Natsume reveals that the talisman familiar was a manipulation type and Hokuto's real controller was somewhere else alive. In Tokyo, Harutora meets with Natsume after enrolling at Onmyo Prep School where he conveys the wrong impression that he knew Hokuto was Natsume the entire time. Harutora doesn't realize Natsume has still kept her ribbon and when Tōji appears having enrolled at Onmyo Prep School as well, the two act overly familiar with each other wherein its subtly revealed that Tōji knows Hokuto's controller was Natsume. On the verge of making a connection, Harutora and Tōji leave with Natsume.
4	"RAVEN's NEST -School-" "REIVUNzu NESUTO -Manabiya-" (RAVEN's NEST -学舎-)	October 30, 2013
Harutora and Touji arrive at the Onmyo Academy. The two are greeted by the man-made Shikigami who guards the entrance, Alpha and Omega. Shortly after that the two meet the principal of the academy, Miyo Kurahashi. The three of them discuss about Natsume and Yakou Tsuchimikado and about the supposed connection between the two. Harutora and Touji then meet their homeroom teacher, Jin Ohtomo. While the two introduce themselves, their new classmates are surprised since the two of them transferred half a year later when the new term started. Kyouko Kurahashi, the granddaughter of the principal, annoyed by this fact has a brief argument with Natsume. After that, Harutora is surprised when Natsume and Touji are acting familiar towards each other as he thinks that they just met yesterday. Harutora and Touji befriends their new classmate Tenma Momoe. He gives a brief info about Kyouko and the current Kurahashi clan. At the end of the day, Harutora finally meets his Shikigami, Kon. Due to a misunderstanding, Natsume catches Harutora with a naked Kon thus causing her to punish him. The next day, Harutora is not paying attention in the class. Kyouko suggests that the class should abandon those who can't keep up with their studies. Ohtomo, on the other hand, tells them that he would still help the students despite the strict Academy rules. This irritates Kyouko and at the same time Kon shows up having her sword pointed towards Kyouko for badmouthing Harutora. Annoyed because of Harutora, Kyouko summons her Shikigami called Hakuou and Kokfuu. Seeing this, Jin Ohtomo suggests them to have a Shikigami duel. Harutora tells his plan to Kon and the two prepare to face against Kyouko's shikigami.
5	"RAVEN's NEST -Bonds-" "REIVUNzu NESUTO -Kizuna-" (RAVEN"s NEST -絆-)	November 6, 2013
During her fight with Harutora, Kyouko remembers her childhood promise with a Tsuchimikado boy. After this flashback, Harutora's Bokken energy bursts out due to overcharging. Jin Ohtomo is forced to stop the duel after watching Harutora lose. Due to his duel against Kyouko, Harutora gets popular in his class which upsets Natsume. Later, Kyouko apologizes to Harutora for her rude behaviour which she reveals due to her assumption that the one she met in her childhood was Natsume. She thinks Natsume has forgot about the promise between her and the Tsuchimikado boy she met. As Natsume arrives, she sees Harutora together with Kyouko and gets upset and cries after scolding him. As Harutora goes to comfort her, she gets caught up in the miasma caused by a Magic Investigator from the Onmyo Agency who is in fact a Yakou disciple. Harutora and the others arrive at the place where Natsume is held hostage by the Yakou disciple and he summons a one-armed demon whom he calls Kakugyouki. After an intense battle with the fake Kakugyouki, Harutora manages to break its seal. Unable to control the fake Kakugyouki, the Yakou disciple flees. After getting rescued by Harutora, Natsume summons her Shikigami dragon Hokuto which kills the fake Kakugyouki. Touji later confirms that the one-armed demon was not the real Kakugyouki. Later, in their conversation Kyouko confesses that she likes Natsume and wants Harutora to help her start dating with Natsume. Harutora is surprised after hearing this as he can't tell her that Natsume is in fact a girl pretending to be a boy. Just after their conversation, Harutora has a flashback of a girl whom he made a promise and the girl looks like a younger Kyouko.
6	"days in nest -holiday-" "deizu in nesuto -kyūjitsu-" (days in nest -休日-)	November 13, 2013
The dorm mothers Mako Fujino and Ako Kifu spots Harutora with a Shikigami that looks like Natsume albeit with a male body. They misunderstand the situation and takes their pictures together which embarrasses Harutora. Weird rumours spread throughout the school about Harutora and Natsume which now includes Touji as well thanks to the dorm mothers. Harutora plans to go shopping on his day off but since Touji has plans, he suggests Harutora and Natsume to go together. This makes Natsume happy as she considers this as a date with Harutora. Next day, while searching for a clothes shop, the two of them gets lost and end up in a love hotel where they hide from the dorm mothers who were chasing them. While the two shares a light moment together, Kon shows up and tells them they are also being searched by Kyouko and Tenma's Shikigami. Natsume thinks that she can handle their Shikigami but when Jin Ohtomo shows up to help in their search she loses all her hope. Harutora calls Touji for help and the two escape thanks to him. They later meet up with Jin Ohtomo and others but things don't go well for Harutora when he is misunderstood again being together with Kon in the hotel room. Later in the evening, Jin Ohtomo manages to successfully locate and capture the Yakou disciple who kidnapped Natsume previously. The principal also shows up controlling her cat Shikigami and she confirms the Yakou disciple's connection with the Twin Horn Syndicate. Shortly after that, Ashiya Douman discusses with a man about the Yakou disciple. The man states that he does not want to get involved with the Twin Horn Syndicate's conflict. He also seems interested in the Tsuchimikado branch family's son Harutora. While he is about to leave, it is subtly revealed that he has one arm missing and that person is actually the real Kakugyouki.
7	"cHImAirA DanCE -Ogre Eater-" "kImAirA DanSU -Onikui-" (cHImAirA DanCE -鬼喰(おにくい)-)	November 20, 2013
Six months has passed since Harutora and Touji enrolled into Onmyo Academy and the students prepare for their end of year exams. Natsume is trying to make Harutora pass his exams by helping him in his studies. In a second duel with Kyouko, Harutora manages to beat one of her two Shikigami. Touji meets Miyo in her room where she discusses about the practical exam which will be the purification of a simulated Spiritual Disaster. She tells him about this exam as she thinks Touji has a handicap in this exam for being a victim of the Spiritual Disaster which happened two years ago. Meanwhile, Jin Ohtomo meets Daizen Amami of the Onmyo Agency. Amami, Jin, and the current investigator of the "Twin Horn Syndicate," Atsune Hirata, discuss about the future plans of the Twin Horn Syndicate which caused the Spiritual Disaster two years ago. Ashiya Douman had contacted a member of the Twin Horn Syndicate, Chihiro Mutobe to conduct a new Spiritual Disaster. The next day, the simulated Spiritual Disaster practical exam is held. However, the exam doesn't go well as a Chimera 01 type Nue appears in the exam site due to the miasma getting stronger. Upon sensing danger, Natsume summons Hokuto to expel the miasma and keep her classmates safe. Reiji Kagami, while pursuing the Nue, appears at the exam site. While Touji is in pain due to the strong miasma, Reiji notices him becoming a Half-Ogre.
8	"cHImAirA DanCE -Half-Ogre-" "kImAirA DanSU -Namanari-" (cHImAirA DanCE -生成(なまなり)-)	November 27, 2013
In a flashback, Touji remembers his past during the time he was receiving treatment from Harutora's father. It is revealed that two years ago Touji was possessed by the same Ogre which caused the Spiritual Disaster. Touji is later admitted to the hospital, but disappears after regaining consciousness. Zenjirou Kogure and his Shikigami pair of Karasu-Tengu arrive at the scene of the growing Spiritual Disaster. He and Reiji suspect the Twin Horn Syndicate of causing the event. The two of them leave the scene to go after the Nue. Natsume agrees to aid the Onmyo Agency by using her dragon, Hokuto, to help fight the Spiritual Disaster. Tenma, Kon, and Harutora search for Touji, while Natsume and Kyouko meet Zenjirou. Later, Harutora runs into some strangers but Kakugyouki arrives and tells them to stop making a scene. Before disappearing, Kakugyouki tells Harutora about Touji's whereabouts. Meanwhile, Reiji Kagami and Iwao Miyachi tries to take down the Chimera 01. While fighting, Harutora explains that Touji can't kill him because Touji loves his friends. While Mari Yuge is making a special barrier to contain the Chimera 01, Hokuto lures the Nue towards the barrier. Later, Chihiro Mutobe casts a spell which causes the Chimaira 01 to progress into a Phase-4 Phenomena.
9	"cHImAirA DanCE -Purification-" "kImAirA DanSU -Shubatsu-" (cHImAirA DanCE -修祓-)	December 4, 2013
After witnessing the Chimera 01 progress to a Phase-4 Phenomena, the Nue starts to run away with Natsume and Zenjirou in pursuit. Back in the hospital, Touji wakes up and finds that Miyo has loosened his Ogre seal. She tells him to control his Ogre power instead of merely driving it away. Elsewhere, Reiji Kagami, Iwao Miyachi and other Onmyouji exorcists are purifying the Chimera 01. Zenjirou and Natsume are stopped by Chihiro Mutobe in their chase. Zenjirou faces Chihiro while the others continue after the Nue. Meanwhile, Tenma comforts Touji and tells him he still considers Touji a friend. Touji decides to help Harutora against the Nue and later arrives at the scene. After an intense battle, they are successful in purifying it. Reiji Kagami comments how their actions will cause Natsume to be famous among the Yakou followers and will re-energize them. He meets Ohtomo, who warns him to stay away from his students. Zenjirou also arrives and tells them he failed to take Chihiro Mutobe into custody, since he had placed a suicide spell on himself and died. Shortly after that, everyone feels the powerful presence of Ashiya Douman who was planning to retrieve the Nue for himself but failed. In the end, Atsune Hirata is seen performing the Taizan Fukun ritual thanking Chihiro Mutobe for his work.
10	"GIRL RETURN -Prodigy-" "GĀRU RITĀN -Shindō-" (GIRL RETURN -神童-)	December 11, 2013
One month after the Spiritual Disaster, "The Second Great Purification of March 3," caused by the Twin Horn Syndicate, Onmyo Academy's entrance ceremony is held and Suzuka Dairenji enrolls. She notices Harutora in the ceremony and declares that he was her first kiss which causes him to be bombarded with questions. Zenjirou Kogure tells Jin Ohtomo that the Onmyo Agency enrolled Suzuka in the Academy as her penalty for the incident she caused last year. Jin states that the Onmyo Academy will take care of Suzuka for her re-education. Natsume becomes worried because Suzuka saw her dressed as a girl during last year's incident, so she continues to hide herself from Suzuka. While searching for Suzuka, Harutora meets an unusual senior third year student who seems interested in Kon. Later in the evening, Suzuka reveals to Harutora that the Onmyo Agency sealed most of her magic powers and gave her a penalty of staying in Onmyo Academy for three years. The next day, she keeps wanting to meet Natsume. Touji suggests that Harutora tell her about Natsume's circumstances regarding the family tradition to dress as a boy. Harutora talks to Suzuka; she cries that even though she killed Hokuto, Harutora doesn't resent her. Harutora releases Suzuka from her guilt when he tells her that Hokuto was in fact a Shikigami controlled remotely by its user. After their conversation, Suzuka notices Natsume's presence and quickly recognizes her as the girl who wore the priestess outfit.
11	"GIRL RETURN -Tiger-" "GĀRU RITĀN -Tora-" (GIRL RETURN -虎-)	December 18, 2013
After learning about Natsume's real gender, Suzuka continues to bully both Harutora and Natsume, though she chooses not to reveal the secret to anyone. As punishment for not answering her phone calls, Suzuka decides to investigate both Harutora's and Natsume's rooms. Natsume becomes very reluctant and defensive. Suzuka notices a barrier placed on Natsume's closet, but Natsume summons Hokuto and ends the situation. The next day, Harutora notices that Kon is still in her physical form and can't transform back. Touji suggests that it was Natsume and Suzuka's fault due to the spells used in the closet incident. Suzuka and Natsume both refuse to ask for the teacher's help. Kon wants to follow Harutora through school, so she disguises herself wearing Harutora's favorite tiger imprinted jacket. She causes trouble in the cafeteria when she is mistaken for a tiger Shikigami. The school issues a tiger warning and calls the Onmyo Agency for help. The principal and Zenjirou conclude that someone sent a tiger Shikigami to attack the students. While Suzuka helps Kon escape, Zenjirou attacks them. They manage to escape, but Harutora's jacket gets destroyed in the process. Suzuka, Kon and Harutora are scolded by Jin and Kon is able to get rid of her physical form. In the end, Suzuka is seen sleeping with a one eyed Tiger plushie toy.
12	"GIRL RETURN -Love-" "GĀRU RITĀN -Koigokoro-" (GIRL RETURN -恋心-)	December 25, 2013
Harutora's whole class goes on a Shikigami training camp somewhere in the mountains. Suzuka also attends the tour, much to Harutora's and Natsume's dismay. Touji then asks Suzuka for a partnership to defend themselves against the Yakou devotees who are after Natsume. She complies, leading Natsume to ask Suzuka if she really is Yakou's reincarnation. Suzuka believes Natsume is but can't be sure. She tells them about the "Raven Coat," a spiritual tool Yakou used to wear that is the only way to find out if Natsume really is his reincarnation. Jin Ohtomo and the principal overhear their conversation. Jin believes that the real Raven Coat is in Onmyo Academy and the one in the Onmyo Agency is just a replica based on information he learned from a man named "Ryo Saotome". The next day, Harutora is stopped by Kyouko who wants to know if he really likes Suzuka. Out of nowhere, Suzuka steps in and rants on about how Harutora likes Hokuto and not her. Harutora tells Kyouko about how Hokuto was a Shikigami being controlled outside, and Kyouko speculates that Hokuto's controller had to be very powerful to make Hokuto seem like a real person for so long. Later on the bus ride home, Harutora notices the pink ribbon in Natsume's hair and realizes that it's the exact ribbon he won for Hokuto at the fair, making him believe that Hokuto's real controller was Natsume.
13	"Black Shaman ASSAULT -Priest-" "Burakku Shāman ASARUTO -Hōshi-" (Black Shaman ASSAULT -法師-)	January 8, 2014
14	"Black Shaman ASSAULT -Face-off-" "Burakku Shāman ASARUTO -Jutsukurabe-" (Black Shaman ASSAULT -術比-)	January 15, 2014
15	"_DARKNESS_EMERGE_ -Encounter-" "_DĀKUNESU_EMĀJI_ -Kaikō-" (_DARKNESS_EMERGE_ -邂逅-)	January 22, 2014
16	"_DARKNESS_EMERGE_ -Divine Fan-" "_DĀKUNESU_EMĀJI_ -Shinsen-" (_DARKNESS_EMERGE_ -神扇-)	January 29, 2014
17	"_DARKNESS_EMERGE_ -Razor-" "_DĀKUNESU_EMĀJI_ -Higekiri-" (_DARKNESS_EMERGE_ -髭切-)	February 5, 2014
A Spirit Disaster begins at the Onmyo Agency's branch office. Harutora, Natsume, and the others fight against Shaver, who has become increasingly berserk. In the process, Natsume's true gender is revealed in front of her friends and other students. To protect her, Harutora manages to tap into the power of the star mark she gave him earlier. He realizes he can now sense the type of spirits around him and how to fight them. He defeats Shaver and the remaining spirits. Later, Amami talks with the Chief about Takiko Souma, assuming she is part of the Twin Horn Syndicate. Souma enters the room and Amami finds out the Chief is also working with her. She presumably kills Amami for knowing too much. Souma and the Chief agree that it's time to attempt turning Natsume into Yakou by using the Raven Coat.
18	"over-cry -Assault-" "ōbā-kurai -Kyoushū-" (over-cry -強襲-)	February 12, 2014
School classes resume as usual. Suzuka persuades Kurahashi to make up with Natsume and Harutora, despite Kurahashi's disappointment that they all kept secrets from her. Harutora talks to Kyouko, then realizes that he is the one from her childhood memories. The next day, the Tsuchimikado house is found to be burned down with Natsume's father nowhere to be found. The events leading up to the fire are revealed: Mari Yuge, on behalf of the Onmyo Agency, had come to take Natsume's father into custody. Later, Jin talks to the newly reincarnated Ashiya Douman, learning that the Twin Horn Syndicate has supporters in the Onmyo Agency.
19	"over-cry -Princess-" "ōbā-kurai -Hime-" (over-cry -姫-)	February 19, 2014
Souma learns of the fire and reveals to Natsume, Harutora, and the others that she is somehow connected to the Onmyo Agency. She duels with Natsume, testing whether Natsume is worthy as Yakou's reincarnation. Jin-sensei steps in to break up the fight when he notices that Harutora's spirit energy seems unusual. Later, Natsume makes up with Kyouko and they acknowledge that they will be rivals for Harutora's attention. The principal talks to Jin-sensei about him resigning as a teacher and working independently behind-the-scenes again. She offers to protect Natsume in Jin's stead, but is also shocked when Jin reveals the Natsume is actually a girl. Meanwhile, Chief Kurahashi is shown talking to a man who is bound to Takiko Souma. He claims to be Yashahara, one of the Imperial Pallbearers that Souma can summon. Souma enters with Mutobe, the other Pallbearer. She questions whether Natsume can become their comrade, and becomes very excited when she is presented with a package presumably containing the Raven Coat.
20	"over-cry -Fireworks-" "ōbā-kurai -Hanabi-" (over-cry -花火-)	February 26, 2014
Natsume reminisces about her childhood, revealing her attempts to be close to Harutora through Hokuto. Later, the group goes to the fireworks festival. While Natsume and Harutora are alone together, she begins to tell him about Hokuto. Their conversation soon gets interrupted when Souma Takiko arrives. She then explains her family's connection to Yakou and reveals that Harutora is Yakou's true reincarnation. She lets loose the Raven Coat, but instead of settling on him, it begins to possess him. By this time, all the others have arrived to the scene and they follow Harutora in an attempt to stop him. Natsume recalls all the events up till date and realizes that the star spell she placed on him really didn't give him spiritual seeing power, it only undid half the curse which was sealing his natural abilities. She decides to completely undo the seal so that Harutora's spiritual power can settle down. After doing so, the Raven Coat stops possessing him. In the process however, Natsume is fatally injured, but manages to tell Harutora that she loves him.
21	"to The Darksky -Dark night-" "tū Za DākuSukai -Yamiyo-" (to The Darksky -闇夜-)	March 5, 2014
Harutora runs off with Natsume's body, with Touji and Suzuka following. They encounter Dairenji Shido, Takiko's summoned familiar. Suzuka recognizes that he is her father, though he had died and was brought back to life. He tries to persuade Harutora to join the Twin Horn Syndicate, offering the Taizan Fukun Ritual to bring Natsume back to life as a bribe. He departs and the Onmyo Agency catches up, taking Harutora in for interrogation. Touji and the others wait at the Onmyo Agency, explaining what happened to the principal. She talks with Zenjiro and they say they'll handle things. Touji and the others decide to sneak back to the Onmyo Agency later to see Harutora and attempt to retrieve Natsume's body in case there's any chance of reviving her. Meanwhile, Jin-sensei visits Natsume and apologizes for not saving her. He calls Ashiya Douman and asks for his help to attack the Onmyo Agency.
22	"to The DarkSky -Protector-" "tū Za DākuSukai -Gohō-" (to The DarkSky -護法-)	March 12, 2014
Harutora talks with Chief Kurahashi and Yashamaru about resurrecting Natsume with the Taizan Fukun Ritual. He almost agrees to cooperate with them when Kon appears and talks him out of trusting such shady people. She assures him that if he is Yakou's reincarnation, he will find a way to revive her himself. Meanwhile, Douman and Jin-sensei attack the Onmyo Agency. Miyachi fights against Douman while Jin-sensei runs into Kagami. Touji, Suzuka, and Kyouko also move in to try finding Harutora.
23	"to The DarkSky -Onmyou-" "tū Za DākuSukai -Onmyō-" (to The DarkSky -陰陽-)	March 19, 2014
A flashback reveals how Tenma single handedly infiltrated the Onmyo Agency and broke the seal on the Raven Coat. He's aided by a magic spider, one of the spells his mother developed. Daizen Amami is shown to still be alive, possibly the one controlling the spider. Jin-sensei easily defeats Kagami. Touji retrieves Harutora from Chief Kurahashi and Yashamaru. They meet up with Suzuka and Kyouko outside. Tenma appears with the Raven Coat and they all manage to get away from the Onmyo Agency. Tenma relays that Suzu has offered assistance with the Taizan Fukun Ritual if Harutora chooses to do it to which he says he will. Zenjiro and Jin-sensei appear, after hearing their plan. Zenjiro plans on stopping them from using forbidden magic. Kyouko manages to slip into a star-reading state for the first time and tells them that she still sees Natsume's stars, and that she's waiting for Harutora. Harutora, Suzuka, and Touji get away to find Natsume.
24	"to The DarkSky -Calling the Dead(Tama Night Crawling)-" "tū Za DākuSukai -Tamayobai-" (to The DarkSky -魂呼(たまよばい)-)	March 26, 2014
Yakou's memories of meeting Kon (Hishamaru) are shown. Presently, Harutora continues on by himself to retrieve Natsume's body. Kagami intercepts him, calling out Shaver to fight as well. He stabs Kon and Harutora rushes to protect her. In the process, his left eye gets slashed and is almost killed. Enraged, Kon decides to release the seal on her to access her full power. She transforms into a grown version of herself (i.e., Hishamaru) and Kakugyouki appears. They fight off Kagami and Shaver and rescue Harutora, showing their loyalty to him. The three continue on and find Natsume, then meeting up with Suzu to perform the Taizan Fukun Ritual. Elsewhere, Jin has Ashiya Douman become his familiar. Harutora's friends also wait to hear from him, receiving only a vague phone call from Suzu saying that the ritual "kind of" worked. Harutora is shown with Natsume again, just long enough for her to repeat that she loves him and for him to kiss her. She supposedly drifts off, with Harutora promising he'll see her again before departing to the sunrise with Hishamaru and Kakugyouki following him as his loyal subjects.

== Reception ==
In Anime News Network's Fall 2013 Anime Preview Guide, reviewers Rebecca Silverman and Theron Martin gave the series an initial rating of 2 out of 5 stars, while reviewers Carlo Santos and Carl Kimlinger gave the series an initial rating of 2.5 out of 5 stars. Martin commented that "the artistic effort is wholly unimpressive beyond the yukata that Hokuto wears and the CG creations stand out too starkly against the regular animation. Director Takaomki Kanasaki is quite capable of producing fun, stylish fare (as he proved with Is This a Zombie?), but this definitely does not qualify. Only some decent early character development saves this one from the garbage pile," while Santos gave a slightly more positive review, stating that "Tokyo Ravens is nothing special, but it isn't horrible, either. This supernatural adventure series employs all the usual trappings of the genre, but does so without making a mess of the story or throwing too many ideas in. In fact, it even spends a good amount of time on the characters' day-to-day lives, instead of rushing them into the action." Silverman praised the series' art and character designs, as well as the series' use of both 2D and 3D CGI graphics, but concludes that "right now it feels like a hodgepodge of ideas that hasn't quite gotten itself grounded yet," while Kimlinger criticized the series' poor start and use of clichés, stating that "watching Tokyo Ravens is probably the closest you'll get to experiencing precognition. In a show that gets the desired effect from its tropes, that wouldn't be a problem. But Ravens only does its tropes half-right."

=== China ban ===
On June 12, 2015, the Chinese Ministry of Culture listed Tokyo Ravens among 38 anime and manga titles banned in China.
