= Shinsen Station =

Railway station in Shibuya, Tokyo, Japan

Coordinates: 35.6572°N 139.6936°E

Shinsen Station 神泉駅

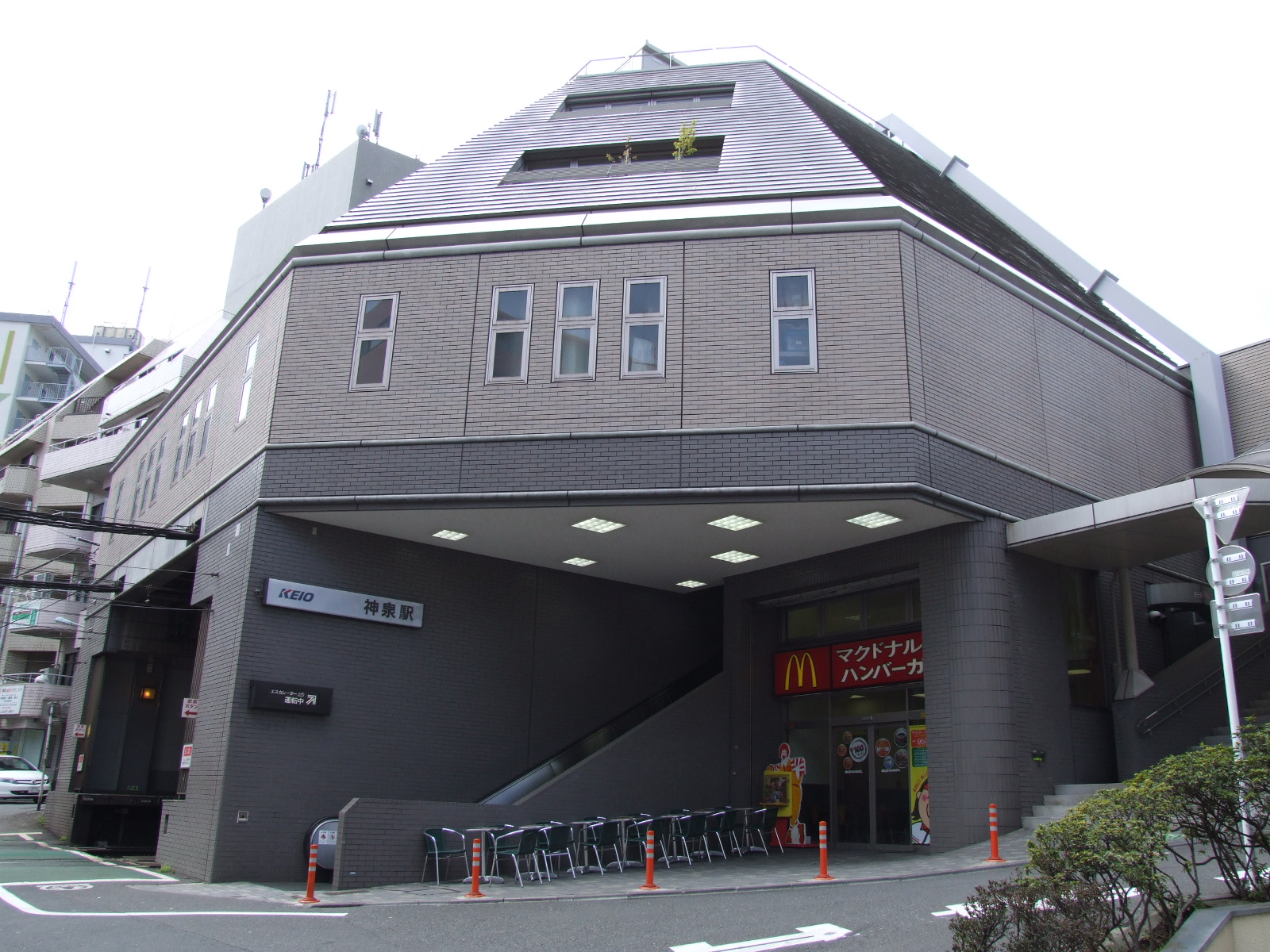
- West exit, April 2008

General information
- Location: Shibuya, Tokyo; Japan
- Operator: Keio Corporation
- Line: Keio Inokashira Line

Other information
- Station code: IN02

History
- Opened: 1 August 1933; 93 years ago

Passengers
- FY2011: 9,871 daily

Services
| Preceding station | Keio Corporation | Following station |
|---|---|---|
| Komaba-tōdaimae towards Kichijōji | Inokashira Line Local | Shibuya Terminus |
Location

Shinsen Station (神泉駅, Shinsen-eki) is a railway station on the Keio Inokashira Line in Shibuya, Tokyo, Japan, operated by the private railway operator Keio Corporation.

== Lines ==
Shinsen Station is served by the 12.7 km Keio Inokashira Line from Shibuya in Tokyo to Kichijōji. Located between Shibuya and Komaba-Tōdaimae, it is 0.5 km from the Shibuya terminus.

== Service pattern ==
Only all-stations "Local" services stop at this station.

== Station layout ==
The station has two opposing side platforms at ground level on either side of the two tracks, which are side by side. The station building is built above the tracks. Although it is considered to be an above-ground station, most of the station is actually within a tunnel so it is somewhat like an underground station.

The effective length of the platform was once only enough to accommodate three 18 m long train cars. As a result, the doors on two cars of trains coming from Kichijoji would not open (even earlier, there was also a period in which some trains simply bypassed the station altogether). The ticket gate and station building on the Shibuya end of the station was extremely simple, in contrast to the current station, which includes a store and entrance on the Shōtō side.

Later, when the Keio 1000 series trains were introduced, which had 20-meter cars, the platform was extended by construction into the tunnel, and starting on September 28, 1995, all doors on trains stopping at the station could open. During the period when the doors would not open, on the inside of the tunnel outside the unopening doors was written the words, "The doors here do not open" (ここではドアがあきません, Koko dewa doa ga akimasen).

Along with the construction in 1995 of the tunnel, construction to renovate the station as a whole was begun and on December 2, 1996, the current station was opened.

There are elevators between both platforms and the ticket gates.

The toilet is located on the upper level by the ticket gates. It includes a multi-purpose toilet, intended to as part of the station’s scheme of universal design.

The station was selected for the "100 Stations of Kantō" (関東の駅百選, Kanto no eki hyakusen) feature by the former Ministry of Transport (運輸省, un'yushō), now part of the Ministry of Land, Infrastructure, Transport and Tourism.

=== Platforms ===
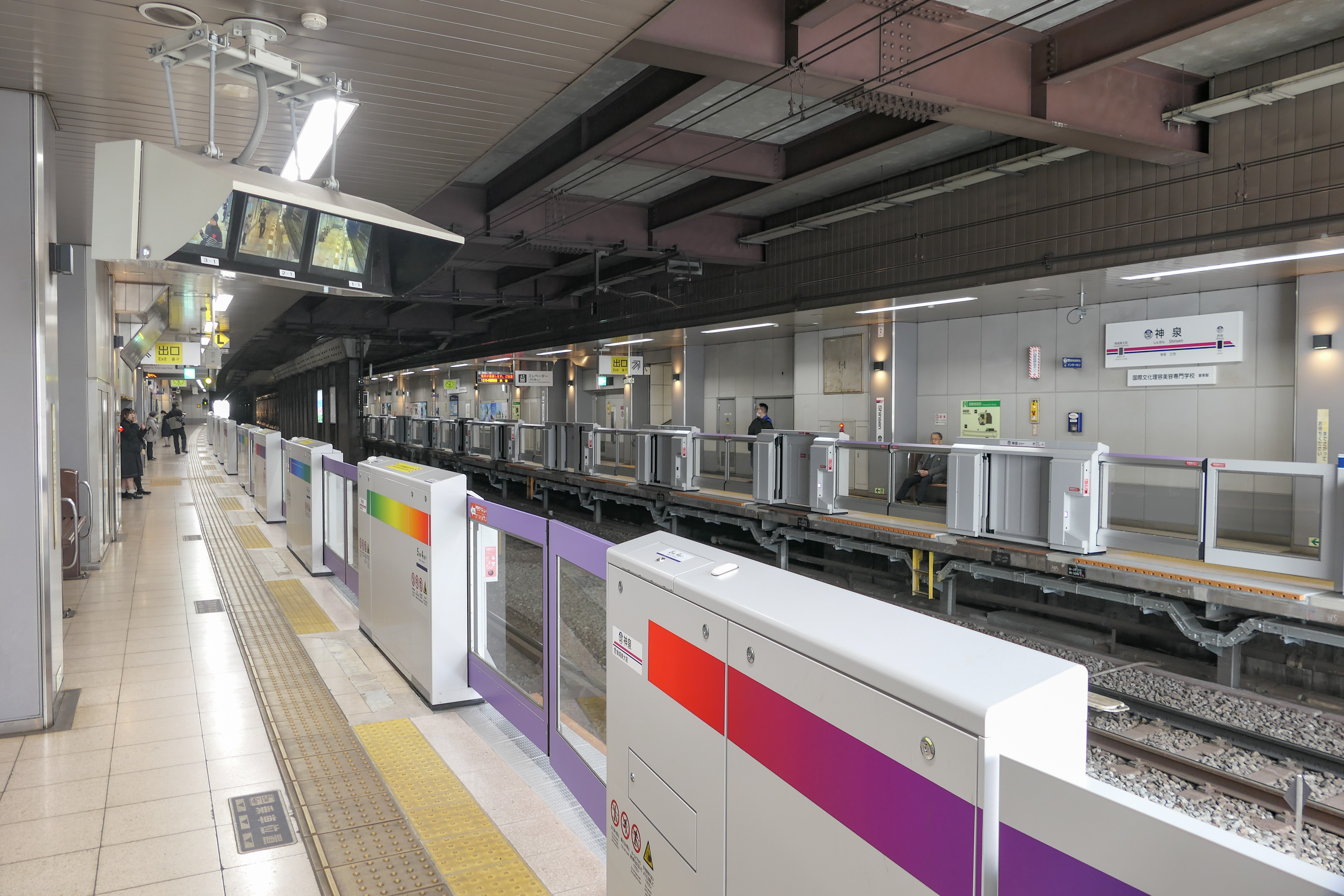
The platforms in March 2024

| 1 | Keio Inokashira Line | for Shimo-Kitazawa, Meidaimae, and Kichijōji |
| 2 | Keio Inokashira Line | for Shibuya |

== History ==
The station opened on August 1, 1933.

From February 22, 2013, station numbering was introduced on Keio lines, with Shinsen Station becoming "IN02".

== Passenger statistics ==
In fiscal 2011, the station was used by an average of 9,871 passengers daily.

The passenger figures for previous years are as shown below.

| Fiscal year | Daily average |
|---|---|
| 1999 | 8,633 |
| 2010 | 10,056 |
| 2011 | 9,871 |

== Surrounding area ==
While rents are high in Shinsen, due to the close proximity to Shibuya, cheaper options are to be found nearer the Dogenzaka side of the station, which is predominantly made up of apartments for single occupants. This area was well known for its love hotels, though in recent years new restaurants, bars, and izakayas have opened. Shinsen is also host to an artistic community with galleries, livehouses and studios.
