= Komaba-tōdaimae Station =

Railway station in Komaba, Tokyo, Japan

Komaba-tōdaimae Station 駒場東大前駅

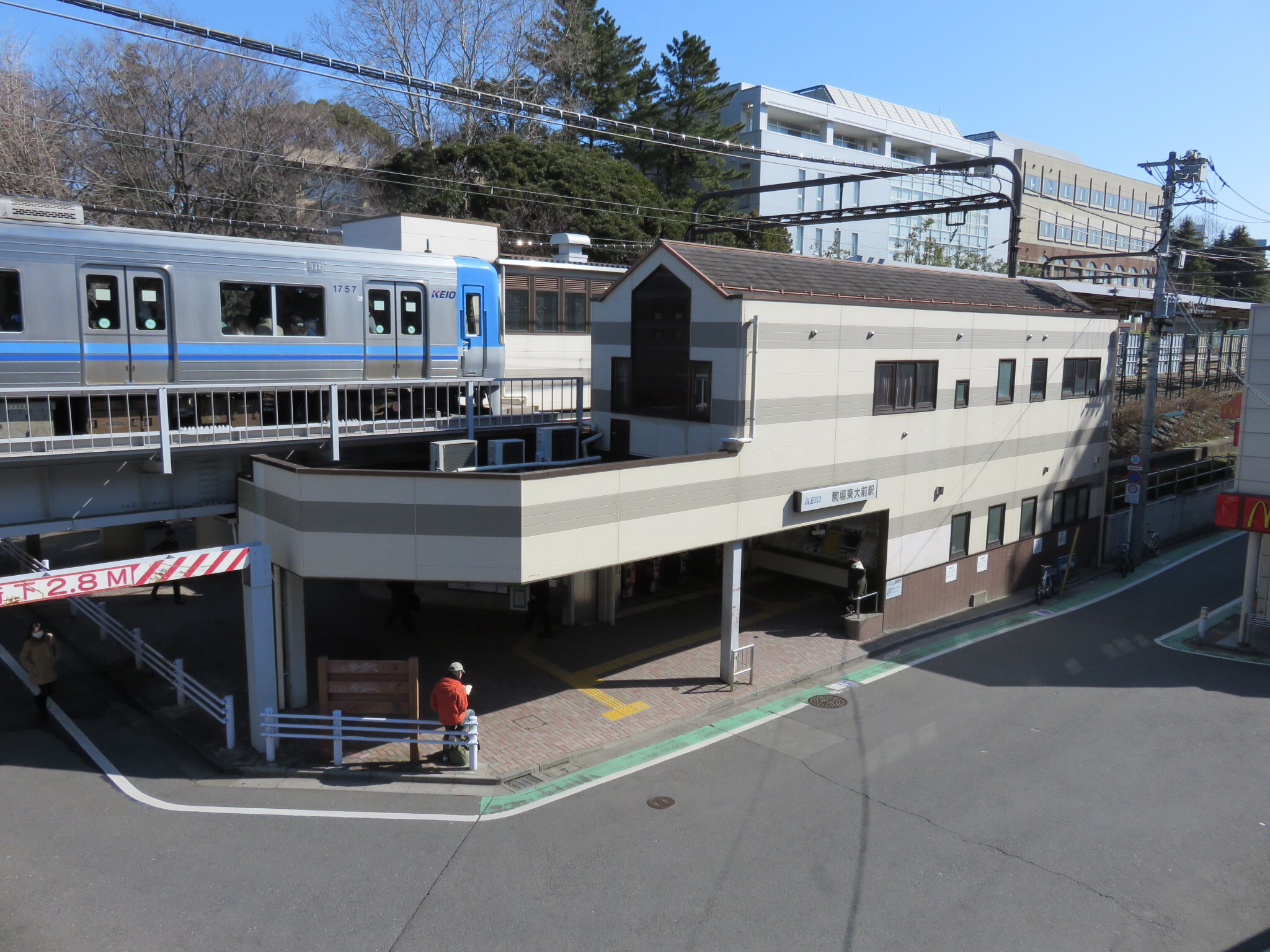
- Komaba-tōdaimae Station, West Exit

General information
- Location: Meguro, Tokyo; Japan
- Coordinates: 35.658611°N 139.684444°E
- Operator: Keio Corporation
- Line: Keio Inokashira Line

Other information
- Station code: IN03

History
- Opened: August 1, 1933; 93 years ago

Passengers
- FY2011: 39,297 daily

Services
Preceding station	Keio Corporation	Following station
Ikenoue towards Kichijōji	Inokashira Line Local	Shinsen towards Shibuya
Location

Komaba-tōdaimae Station (駒場東大前駅, Komaba-tōdaimae eki) is a railway station on the Keio Inokashira Line in Komaba, Meguro, Tokyo, Japan, operated by the private railway operator Keio Corporation.

The station's name is a combination of Komaba, the name of the suburb in which it is located, and Todai-mae - which means "in front of University of Tokyo".

== Lines ==
Komaba-tōdaimae Station is served by the 12.7 km Keio Inokashira Line from Shibuya in Tokyo to Kichijōji. Located between Shinsen and Ikenoue, it is 1.4 km from the Shibuya terminus.

== Service pattern ==
Only all-stations "Local" services stop at this station. On special occasions in November the express train will stop at the station temporarily.

== Station layout ==
There are two main exits from the station, East and West. The East Exit is close to the main entrance to the Komaba campus of the University of Tokyo, and to the central part of Komaba. The West Exit leads to Komaba 2, 3, and 4 chōme.

The station has one island platform, serving two tracks. Because the station is located on a slope, on the western end, toward Kichijoji, it is effectively an elevated station; the eastern end is an ordinary ground-level platform. The ticket gate at the western entrance is located on ground level, below the level of the platform, and the gate at eastern gate is located in an above-track station building, higher than the platforms.

There is an elevator between the platform and ground-level at the western entrance.

=== Platforms ===
1	Keio Inokashira Line	for Shimo-Kitazawa, Meidaimae, and Kichijōji
2	Keio Inokashira Line	for Shibuya

== History ==
- August 1, 1933: Teito Electric Railway opened Higashi-Komaba Station and Nishi-Komaba Station.
- August 10, 1935: Higashi-Komaba Station was renamed Ichikō-mae Station.
- August 1, 1937: Nishi-Komaba Station was renamed Komaba Station (notification filed on July 8).
- May 1, 1940: Following the merger with Odawara Express Railway, the station became part of the company's Teito Line.
- May 1, 1942: Odakyu Electric Railway merged with Tokyu Corporation to form the Dai-Tokyu conglomerate.
- June 1, 1948: Keio Teito Electric Railway was separated from Tokyu Corporation, and the station became part of the Inokashira Line.
- December 1, 1951: Ichikō-mae Station was renamed Todaimae Station.
- July 11, 1965: Komaba Station and Todaimae Station were merged to form Komaba-Tōdaimae Station.

From 22 February 2013, station numbering was introduced on Keio lines, with Komaba-tōdaimae Station becoming "IN03".

== Passenger statistics ==
In fiscal 2013, the station was used by an average of 39,813 passengers daily.

The passenger figures for previous years are as shown below.

Fiscal year	Daily average
1999	35,524
2010	40,024
2011	39,297
2012	39,119
2013	39,813

== Surrounding area ==
- University of Tokyo, Komaba Campus
- National Center for University Entrance Examinations
- Japanese Folk Crafts Museum
- Komaba Park
