= Shimokitazawa =

Area in Kitazawa, Setagaya, Tokyo

Coordinates: 35°39′42″N 139°40′00″E

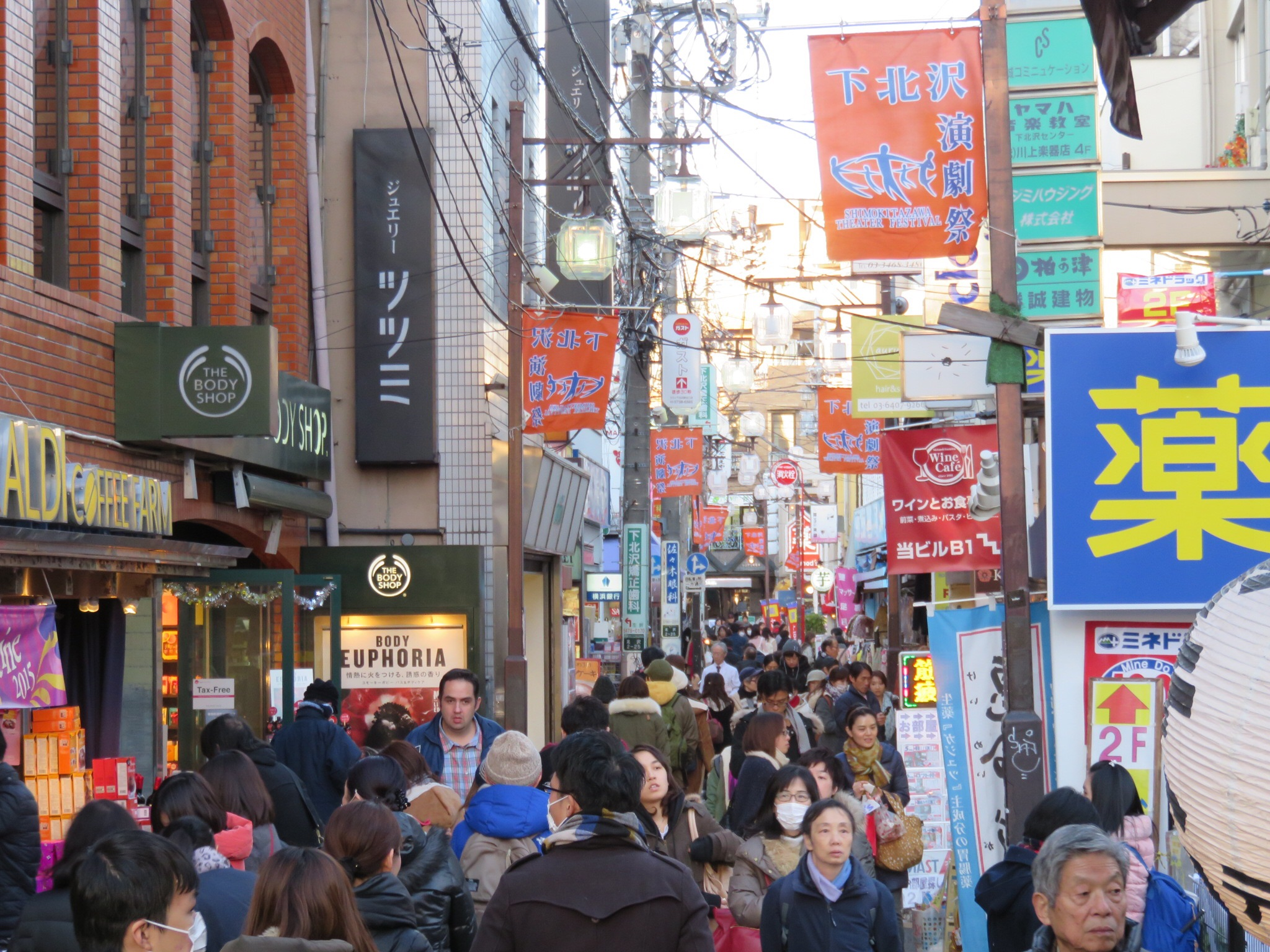
Shimokitazawa street scene

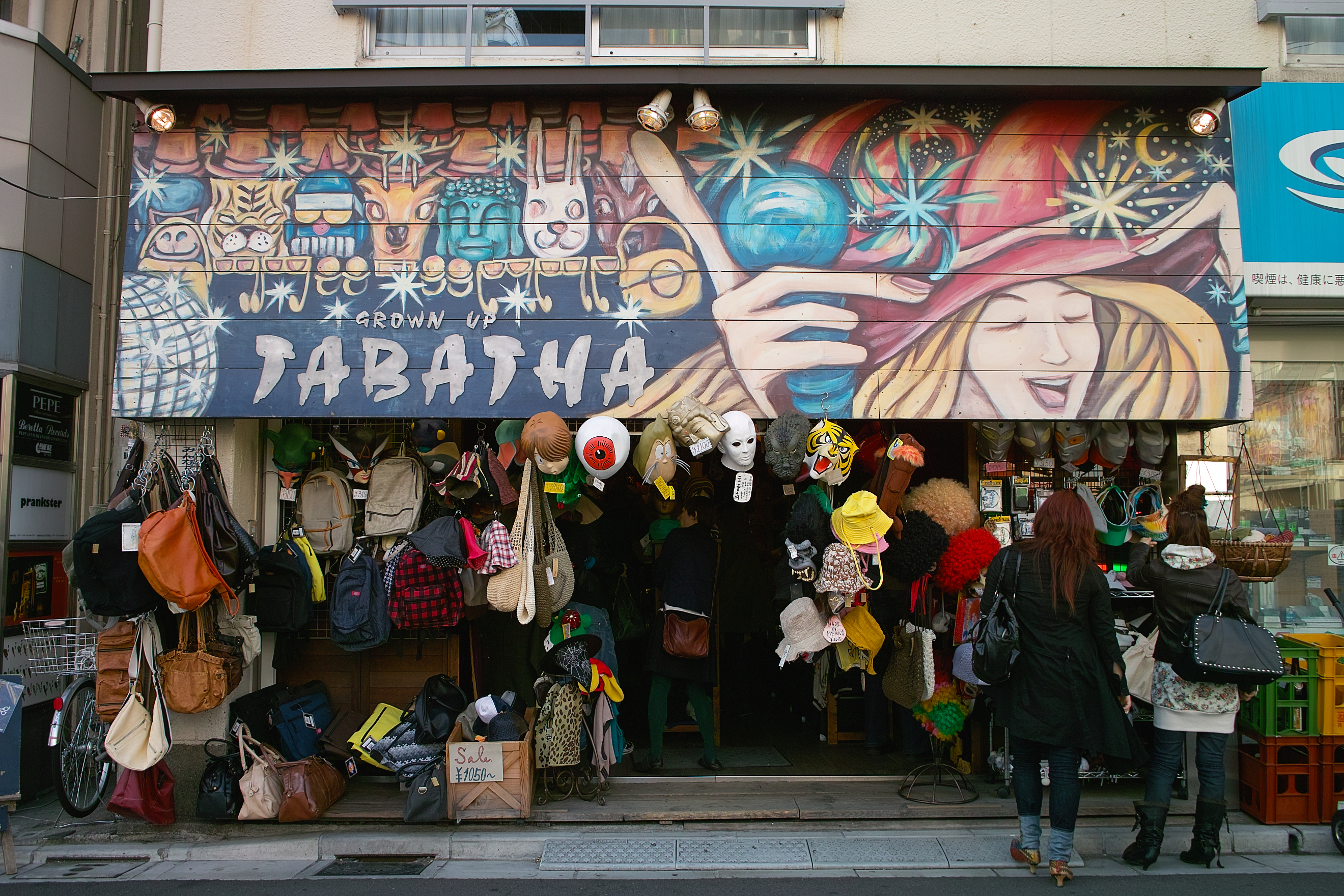
Independent fashion retail; a feature of Shimokitazawa

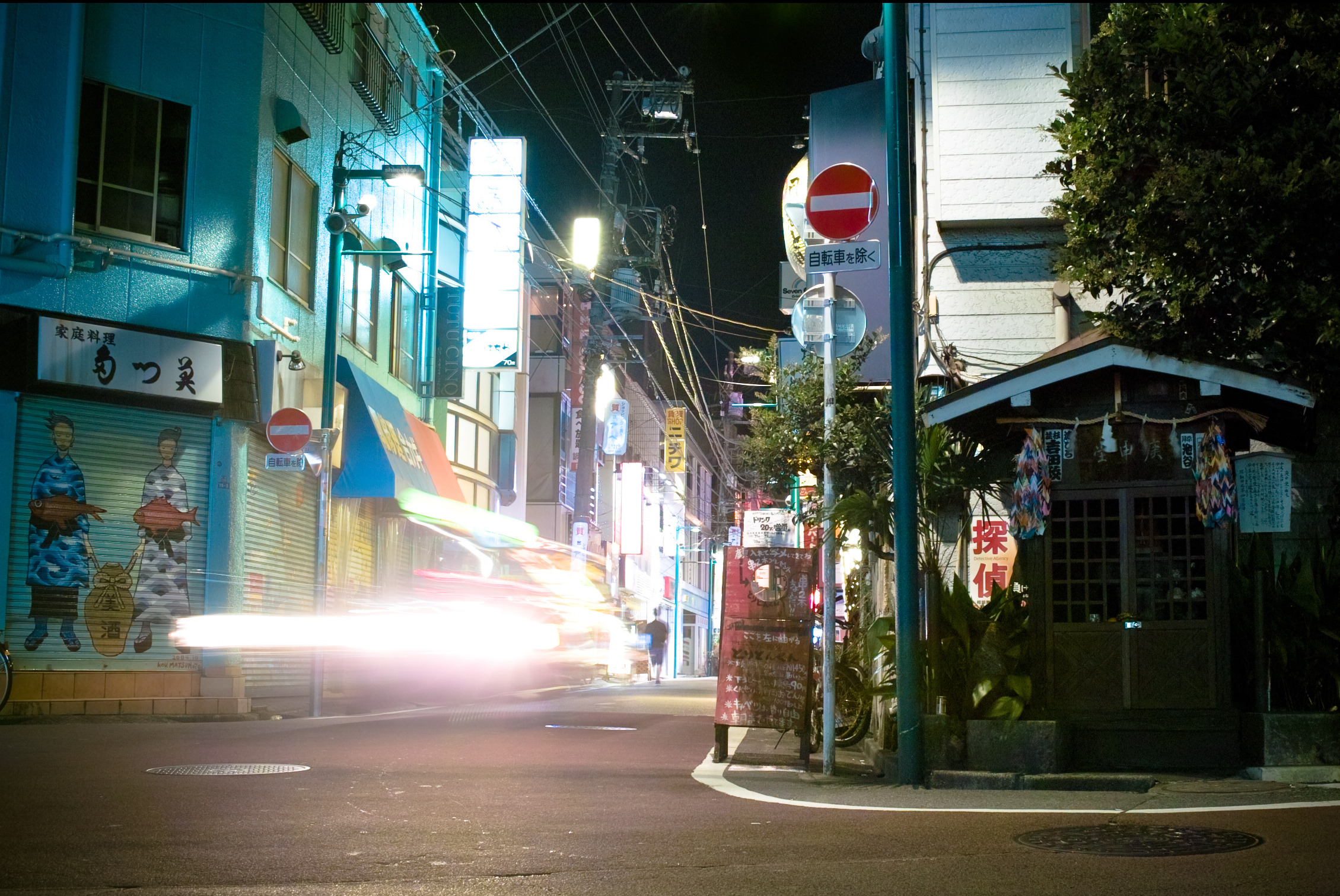
A small Shinto shrine in Shimokitazawa at night

Shimokitazawa (下北沢, Shimokitazawa) is a neighborhood in Setagaya, Tokyo, Japan. It is located in the southwestern corner of the Kitazawa district, hence the name "Shimo-kitazawa" (lit. lower Kitazawa). Also known as "Shimokita", the neighbourhood is well known for the density of small independent fashion retailers, cafes, theaters, bars and live music venues.

== History ==
The agricultural community of Shimokitazawa Village is first mentioned in 1912, where it was remarked that villagers would travel to Shibuya in order to trade. At the time, only one shop was recorded in Shimokitazawa Village. The area around the nearby Ikenoue Station, however, was much more renowned for commerce. In 1927, Shimokitazawa Station was built, and was connected to the Keio Inokashira Line in 1933. This led to a rapid growth of population in the region. Paddy fields were cleared to build the station, and craftsmen and merchants began to move in. The rapid development of properties, public spaces, and businesses led to Shimokitazawa's somewhat cramped appearance, which remains to this day. In 1991, a town hall was built, which was equipped in order to spur the growth of performing arts.

== Independent retail ==
The neighbourhood is often compared with the backstreets of Ura-Harajuku and Koenji; smaller shop units and restricted vehicular access has limited its appeal to larger domestic and international fashion merchandisers, enabling independent retailers to survive. The district consists of the streets immediately surrounding Shimo-Kitazawa Station, where the Odakyu Electric Railway and Keio Inokashira Lines intersect. The neighbourhood has long been a center for stage theater and live music venues; serves as a home to the historic Honda Gekijō theater and holds theatre festivals throughout the year. With numerous cafes, secondhand and vintage fashion and recorded music outlets, Shimokitazawa remains popular with students and followers of Japanese youth subcultures.

== Redevelopment ==
In 2004, the Setagaya City Council released a plan to redevelop a large section of the city, including the construction of several high rise buildings, and extending Route 54 across the city. The streets are very narrow and highly intersected, with many small alleyways. Because many residents and visitors consider this to be part of the charm of Shimokitazawa, some controversy surrounds the development plan, which some saw as degrading and crassly commercialized.

With the relocation of the Odakyu Line rail tracks underground in March 2013, new station entrances, along with fully doubled tracks in both directions, larger scale redevelopment of the immediate Shimo-Kitazawa Station area is ongoing. The infamous Odakyu rush hour crunch has been reduced to 150% of train load as of 2018 from nearly 200% previously.

== In popular culture ==
Pre-redevelopment era Shimokitazawa featured as the setting for Shimokita Sundays, a 2006 television comedy series starring Aya Ueto as a member of one of the many underground theatre troupes found in the district.

An episode revolving around a member of a Shimokitazawa theatre troupe also appeared in the television series Solitary Gourmet, highlighting a well known Hiroshima-style okonomiyaki restaurant in the area.

Shimokitazawa serves as the primary setting of the manga series Bocchi the Rock! and its anime adaptation. The popularity of this series has contributed to increased tourism in the area to the point the characters are appointed as ambassadors for the area to promote the activities such as Shimokitazawa Curry Fest.
