= Higashi-matsubara Station =

Railway station in Tokyo, Japan

Coordinates: 35.6627°N 139.6556°E

Higashi-matsubara Station 東松原駅

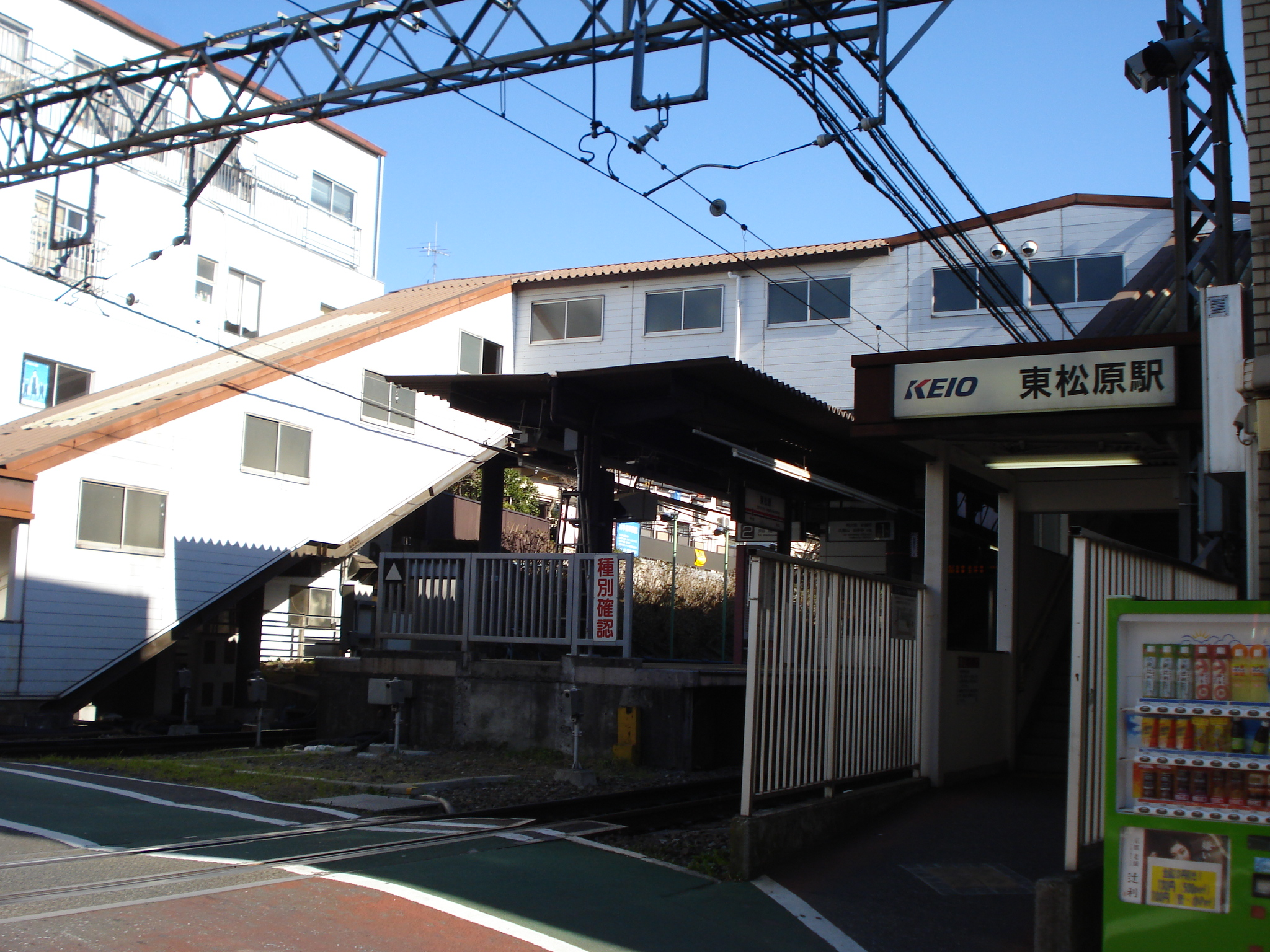
- West entrance, May 2011

General information
- Location: Setagaya, Tokyo; Japan
- Operator: Keio Corporation
- Line: Keio Inokashira Line

Other information
- Station code: IN07

History
- Opened: August 1, 1933; 93 years ago

Passengers
- FY2011: 18,374 daily

Services
Preceding station	Keio Corporation	Following station
Meidaimae towards Kichijōji	Inokashira Line Local	Shindaita towards Shibuya
Location

Higashi-matsubara Station (東松原駅, Higashi-matsubara-eki) is a railway station on the Keio Inokashira Line in Setagaya, Tokyo, Japan, operated by the private railway operator Keio Corporation.

== Lines ==
Higashi-matsubara Station is served by the 12.7 km Keio Inokashira Line from Shibuya in Tokyo to Kichijōji. Located between Shindaita and Meidaimae, it is 4.0 km from the Shibuya terminus.

== Service pattern ==
Only all-stations "Local" services stop at this station.

== Station layout ==
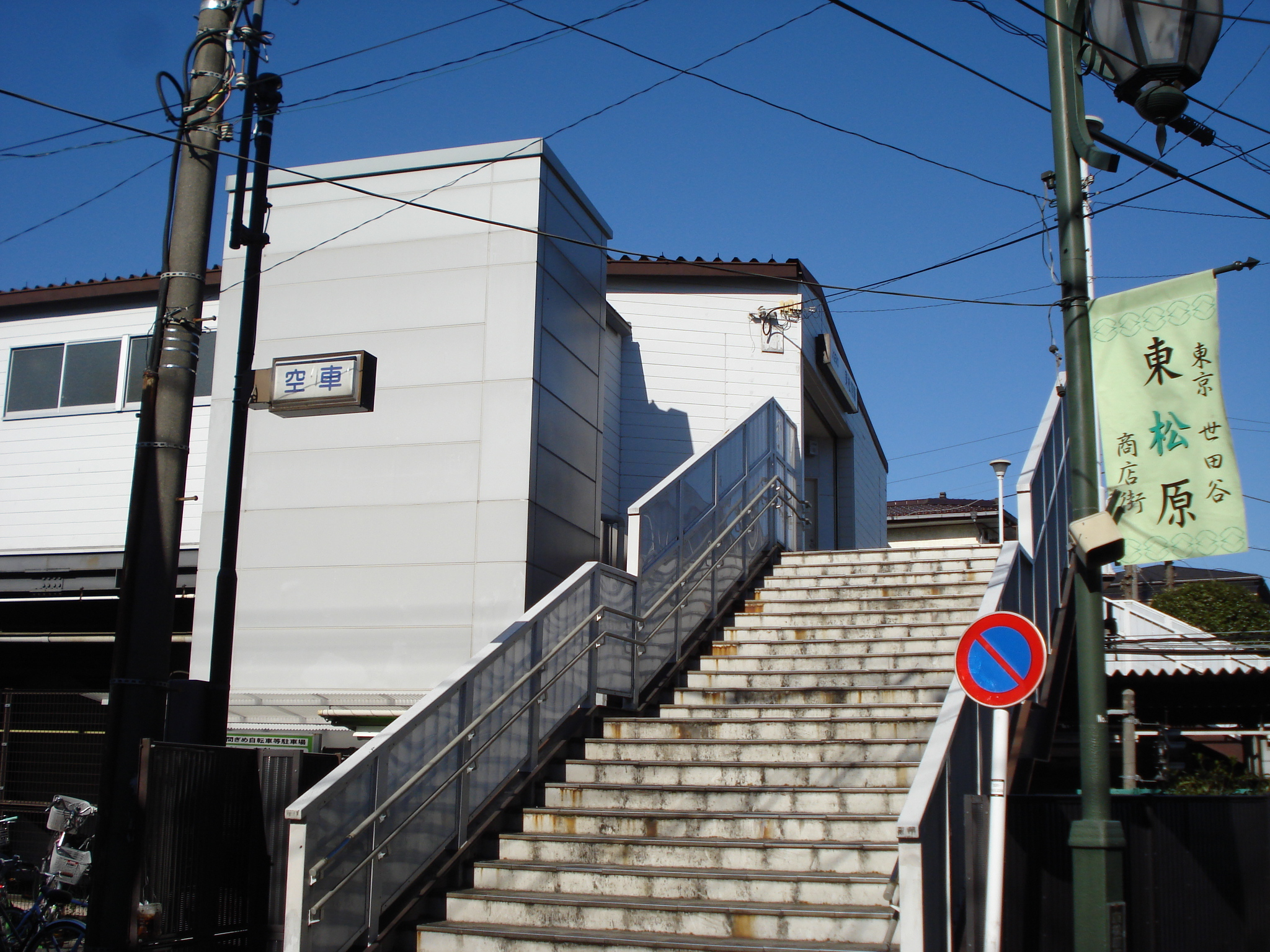
East entrance, May 2011

The station consists of a ground-level island platform serving two tracks, with the station building built above the tracks. On both the east and west ends (toward Shibuya and Kichijoji respectively), the exits are served by over-track bridges, between which is the station building. There are elevators from the south side of the east end of the station to the ground-level exit, and also between the ticket gate area and platforms.

The platform was previously only long enough to accommodate four 18-meter cars, with roads crossing the tracks at either end, and the station building on the western end. Later, the crossing on the eastern end was closed, the platform extended, and the existing station building was closed and rebuilt as an above-track station.

=== Platforms ===
1	Keio Inokashira Line	for Meidaimae, Eifukuchō, and Kichijōji
2	Keio Inokashira Line	for Shimo-Kitazawa and Shibuya

== History ==
The station opened on August 1, 1933.

From 22 February 2013, station numbering was introduced on Keio lines, with Higashi-matsubara Station becoming "IN07".

== Passenger statistics ==
In fiscal 2011, the station was used by an average of 18,374 passengers daily.

The passenger figures for previous years are as shown below.

Fiscal year	Daily average
1999	16,426
2010	18,529
2011	18,374

== Surrounding area ==
- Hanegi Park
