= Ikenoue Station =

Railway station in Setagaya, Tokyo, Japan

Ikenoue Station 池ノ上駅

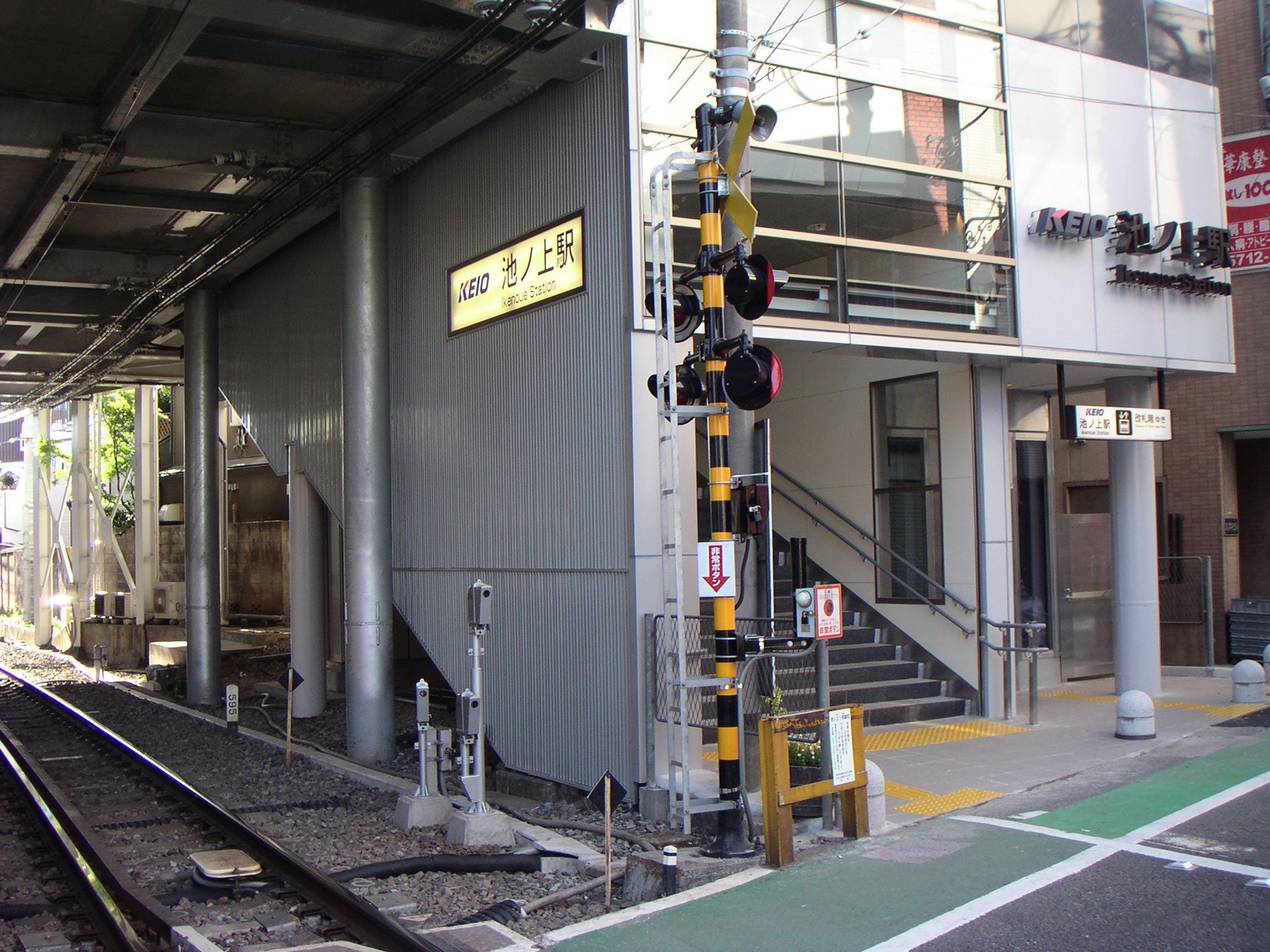
- Ikenoue Station entrance, April 2006

General information
- Location: Setagaya, Tokyo; Japan
- Coordinates: 35°39′38″N 139°40′23″E
- Operator: Keio Corporation
- Line: Keio Inokashira Line

Other information
- Station code: IN04

History
- Opened: August 1, 1933; 93 years ago

Passengers
- FY2011: 9,334 daily

Services
Preceding station	Keio Corporation	Following station
Shimo-kitazawa towards Kichijōji	Inokashira Line Local	Komaba-tōdaimae towards Shibuya
Location

Ikenoue Station (池ノ上駅, Ikenoue-eki) is a railway station on the Keio Inokashira Line in Setagaya, Tokyo, Japan, operated by the private railway operator Keio Corporation.

== History ==
The station opened on August 1, 1933.

From 22 February 2013, station numbering was introduced on Keio lines, with Ikenoue Station becoming "IN04".

== Lines ==
Ikenoue Station is served by the 12.7 km Keio Inokashira Line from Shibuya in Tokyo to Kichijōji. Located between Komaba-Tōdaimae and Shimo-Kitazawa, it is 2.4 km from the Shibuya terminus.

== Service pattern ==
Only all-stations "Local" services stop at this station.

== Station layout ==
The station consists of a ground-level island platform serving two tracks. It is an above-ground station, with the station building built above the tracks. The station has two exits, so this construction installed three elevators, between the platform and concourse, between the concourse and north exit, and between the concourse and south exit. On the north-side exit there is only an elevator, and no stairs. The toilets is at the upper level, inside the ticket gates.

=== Platforms ===
1	Keio Inokashira Line	for Shimo-Kitazawa, Meidaimae, and Kichijōji
2	Keio Inokashira Line	for Shibuya

== Passenger statistics ==
In fiscal 2011, the station was used by an average of 9,334 passengers daily.

== Surrounding area ==
- Youth Exchange Center Ikenoue Seishonen Kaikan
- Shoei church
- Institute of Industrial Science, the University of Tokyo
- Research Center for Advanced Science and Technology, The University of Tokyo
- Higashikitazawa station
- Holy Trinity Church, Tokyo
- Komabano park
- Higashi-Kitazawa station
- Komaba park
- Kitazawa town hall
- Tokyo Metropolitan Kokusai High School
- Junior and Senior High School at Komaba, University of Tsukuba
- Shoin Junior and Senior High School
- Komaba Gakuen High School

The passenger figures for previous years are as shown below.

Fiscal year	Daily average
1999	10,451
2010	9,396
2011	9,334
