= Daitabashi Station =

Railway station in Tokyo, Japan

Coordinates: 35.6712°N 139.6597°E

Daitabashi Station 代田橋駅

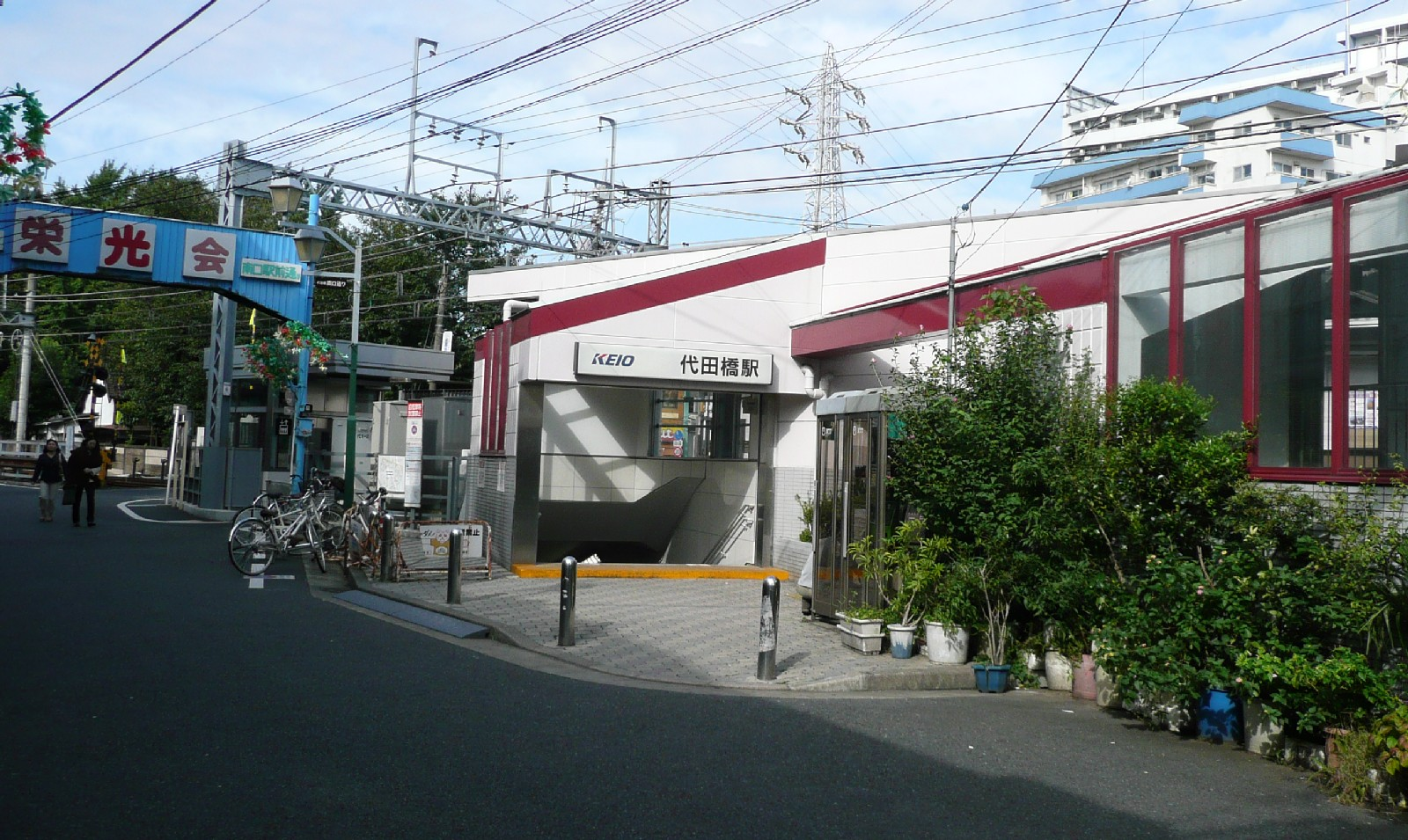
- Entrance of the station

General information
- Location: Setagaya, Tokyo; Japan
- Operator: Keio Corporation
- Line: Keiō Line

Other information
- Station code: KO05

History
- Opened: 15 April 1913; 113 years ago

Services
Preceding station	Keio Corporation	Following station
Meidaimae towards Keiō-hachiōji	Keiō Line Local	Sasazuka towards Shinjuku
Location

Daitabashi Station (代田橋駅, Daitabashi-eki) is a railway station on the Keiō Line in Setagaya, Tokyo, operated by the private railway operator Keio Corporation.

== Lines ==
Daitabashi Station is served by the Keiō Line, and lies 4.4 km from the line's Tokyo terminus at Shinjuku.

== Station layout ==
This station has two ground-level side platforms.

=== Platforms ===
1	Keiō Line	for Meidaimae, Chōfu, Kitano, and Keiō-Hachiōji; Keiō Sagamihara Line for Hashimoto (via Chōfu); Keiō Takao Line for Takaosanguchi (via Kitano)
2	Keiō Line	for Sasazuka and Shinjuku; Keiō New Line for Shinjuku; Toei Shinjuku Line for Moto-Yawata

== History ==
Daitabashi Station opened on 15 April 1913.
