= Keio 1000 series =

Japanese electric multiple unit train type

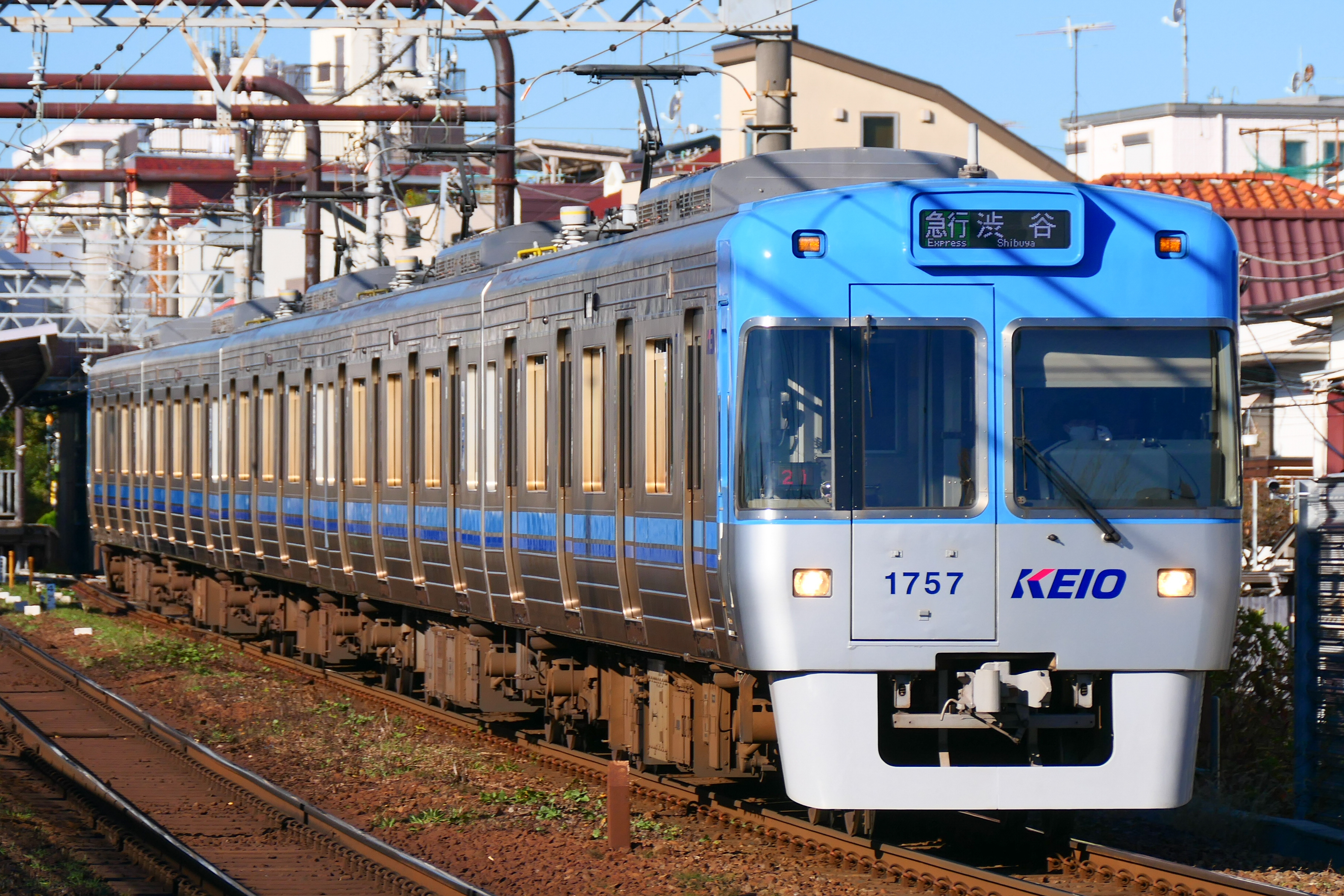
- Set 1707 in December 2022
- In service: 1996–present
- Manufacturers: Tokyu Car Corp, Nippon Sharyo
- Replaced: Keio 3000 series
- Constructed: 1995–2010
- Entered service: 9 January 1996
- Refurbished: 2016–2020
- Number built: 145 vehicles (29 sets)
- Number in service: 145 vehicles (29 sets)
- Formation: 5 cars per trainset
- Fleet numbers: 1701–1715; 1721–1734
- Operator: Keio Corporation
- Depot: Fujimigaoka
- Line served: Inokashira Line

Specifications
- Car body construction: Stainless steel
- Car length: 20,000 mm (65 ft 7 in)
- Width: 2,864 mm (9 ft 5 in)
- Doors: 4 pairs per side
- Maximum speed: 90 km/h (56 mph)
- Traction system: Variable frequency (GTO/IGBT)
- Acceleration: 2.6 km/(h⋅s) (1.6 mph/s) (batches 1-2); 3.3 km/(h⋅s) (2.1 mph/s) (batches 3-6)
- Deceleration: 3.7 km/(h⋅s) (2.3 mph/s) (service); 4.0 km/(h⋅s) (2.5 mph/s) (emergency)
- Electric systems: 1,500 V DC (overhead line)
- Current collection: Pantograph
- Safety system: Keio ATC
- Track gauge: 1,067 mm (3 ft 6 in)

The Keio 1000 series (京王1000系) is a DC commuter electric multiple unit (EMU) train type operated by Keio Corporation in Tokyo, Japan. Introduced into service on 9 January 1996, a total of 29 five-car sets were built between 1995 and 2010 by Tokyu Car Corporation and Nippon Sharyo in six batches for use on the Keio Inokashira Line.

== Variants ==
As of 1 April 2016, the fleet consists of 29 five-car trainsets.

=== Batches 1-2 ===
Sets 1701 to 1710. Formation consists of two motor and three trailer cars.

=== Batches 3-4 ===
Sets 1711 to 1715. Formation consists of three motor and two trailer cars. Raised driver's position.

=== Batches 5-6 ===
Sets 1721 to 1734. Formation consists of three motor and two trailer cars. Beadless stainless steel bodysides. Full-colour LED destination indicator panels. Interior includes 17-inch colour LCD information panels.

== Formations ==
=== Sets 1701 to 1710 (unrefurbished) ===
The first ten sets, 1701 to 1710, were originally formed as follows with two motored ("M") cars and three non-powered trailer ("T") cars, and car 1 at the Kichijoji (western) end.

| Car No. | 1 | 2 | 3 | 4 | 5 |
|---|---|---|---|---|---|
| Designation | Tc2 | M' | T | M | Tc1 |
| Numbering | KuHa 1700 | DeHa 1000 | SaHa 1500 | DeHa 1100 | KuHa 1750 |

Cars 2, 3, and 4 each have one single-arm pantograph. Car 3 is designated a mildly air-conditioned car. Car 1 has a wheelchair space.

=== Refurbished sets 1701 to 1710 ===
The refurbished sets are formed as follows with three motored ("M") cars and two non-powered trailer ("T") cars, and car 1 at the Kichijoji (western) end.

| Car No. | 1 | 2 | 3 | 4 | 5 |
|---|---|---|---|---|---|
| Designation | Tc2 | M2 | M1 | M | Tc1 |
| Numbering | KuHa 1700 | DeHa 1000 | DeHa 1050 | DeHa 1100 | KuHa 1750 |
| Capacity (total/seated) | 144/46 | 155/54 | 155/54 | 155/54 | 144/46 |
| Weight (t) | 26.0 | 33.3 | 31.2 | 34.2 | 26.0 |

Cars 2, 3, and 4 each have one single-arm pantograph.

=== Sets 1711 to 1715, 1721 to 1734 ===
Sets 1711 to 1715 and 1721 to 1734 are formed as follows with three motored ("M") cars and two non-powered trailer ("T") cars, and car 1 at the Kichijoji (western) end.

| Car No. | 1 | 2 | 3 | 4 | 5 |
|---|---|---|---|---|---|
| Designation | Tc2 | M2 | M1 | M | Tc1 |
| Numbering | KuHa 1700 | DeHa 1000 | DeHa 1050 | DeHa 1100 | KuHa 1750 |

Cars 2, 3, and 4 each have one single-arm pantograph. Car 3 is designated a mildly air-conditioned car. Car 1 has a wheelchair space.

== History ==
The 1000 series sets were initially built by Tokyu Car Corp. The type entered service on 9 January 1996, and was the first new rolling stock introduced on the Keio Inokashira Line in three decades, after the 3000 series of 1962. It was the first type on the Inokashira Line to feature 20 m (65 ft 7 in) long cars with four pairs of doors per side.

Third- and fourth-batch sets 1711 to 1715, built between 2003 and 2004, incorporate system and interior modifications.

A new batch of 14 (batches 5-6) 5-car 1000 series sets (1721–1734) built by Nippon Sharyo and Tokyu Car Corp were delivered between 2008 and 2010 to replace ageing rolling stock on the Inokashira Line. These new trains feature full-colour LED destination indicators.

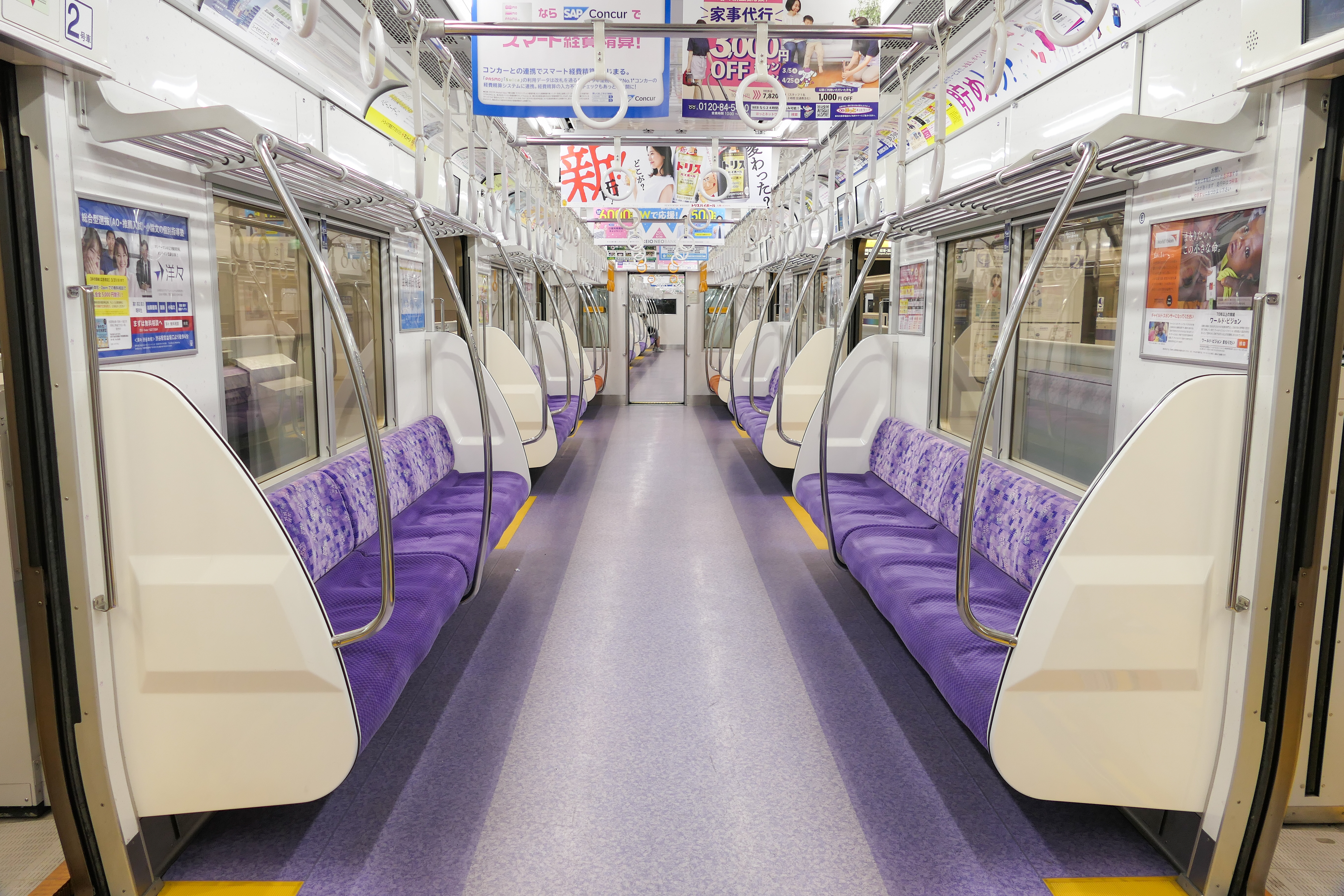
Interior of an early-build 1000 series set

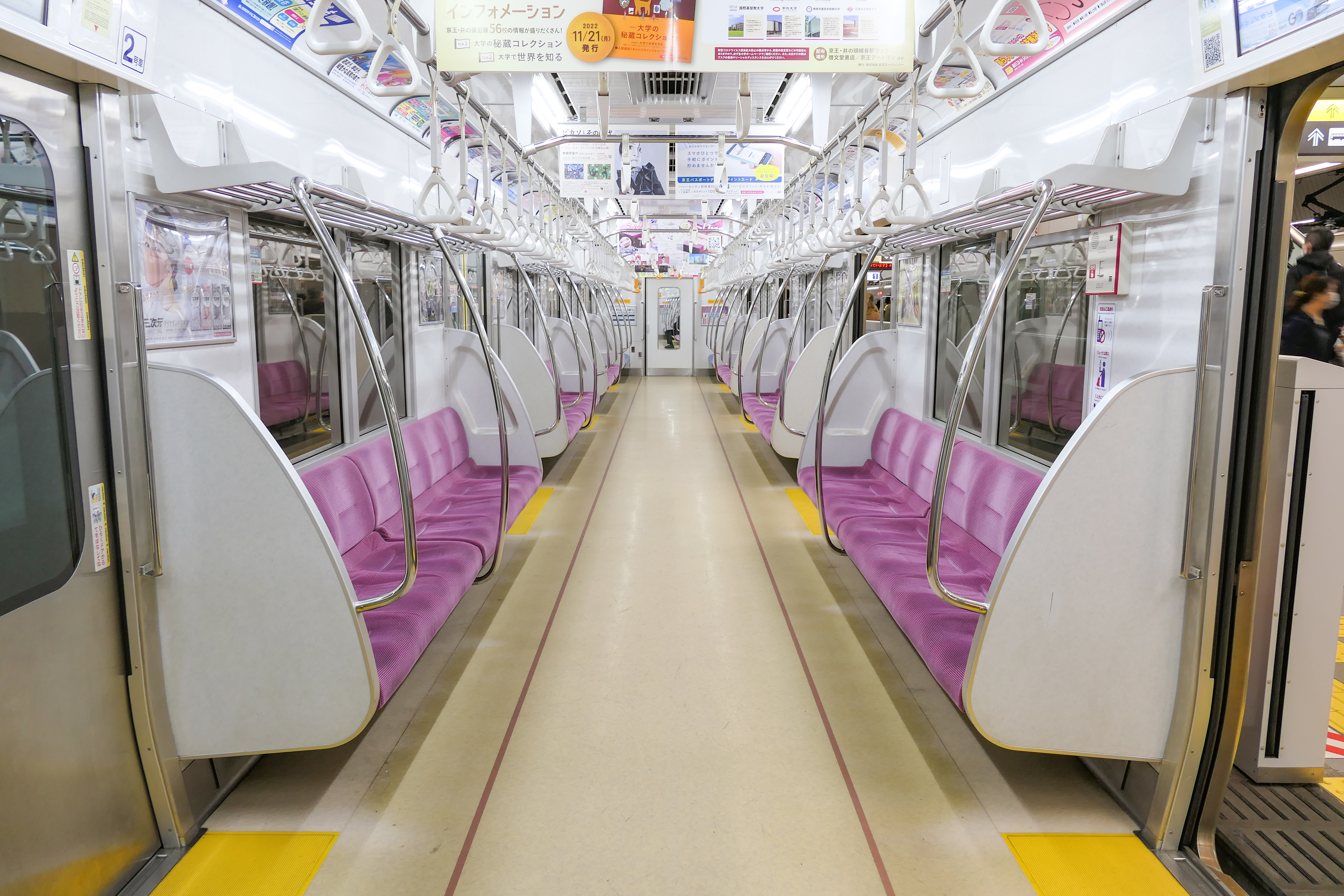
Interior of a late-build 1000 series set

=== Refurbishment ===
Starting in 2016, the original batch of ten sets is undergoing a programme of refurbishment. Refurbishment includes converting the centre trailer car to a motor car to provide three motored cars per five-car set, as is the case with later-build sets. The ten original sets are all scheduled to be refurbished by 2020.

== Livery variations ==
The cab ends are painted one of several different pastel colours as shown below. The colour is also used for bodyside stripes.

| Colour | Set numbers | | | |
|---|---|---|---|---|
| Light blue | 1701 | 1708 | 1715 | 1722 |
| Ivory white | 1702 | 1709 | 1723 | 1730 |
| Salmon pink | 1703 | 1710 | 1724 | 1731 |
| Light green | 1704 | 1711 | 1725 | 1732 |
| Violet | 1705 | 1712 | 1726 | 1733 |
| Orange | 1706 | 1713 | 1727 | 1734 |
| Blue | 1707 | 1714 | 1721 | 1728 |
| Rainbow | 1729 | | | |

Sets 1706 and 1713 were originally painted in a beige colour scheme. Their schemes were changed to orange-beige in 2010. Set 1729 was repainted in a new "rainbow" colour scheme from 3 October 2012.

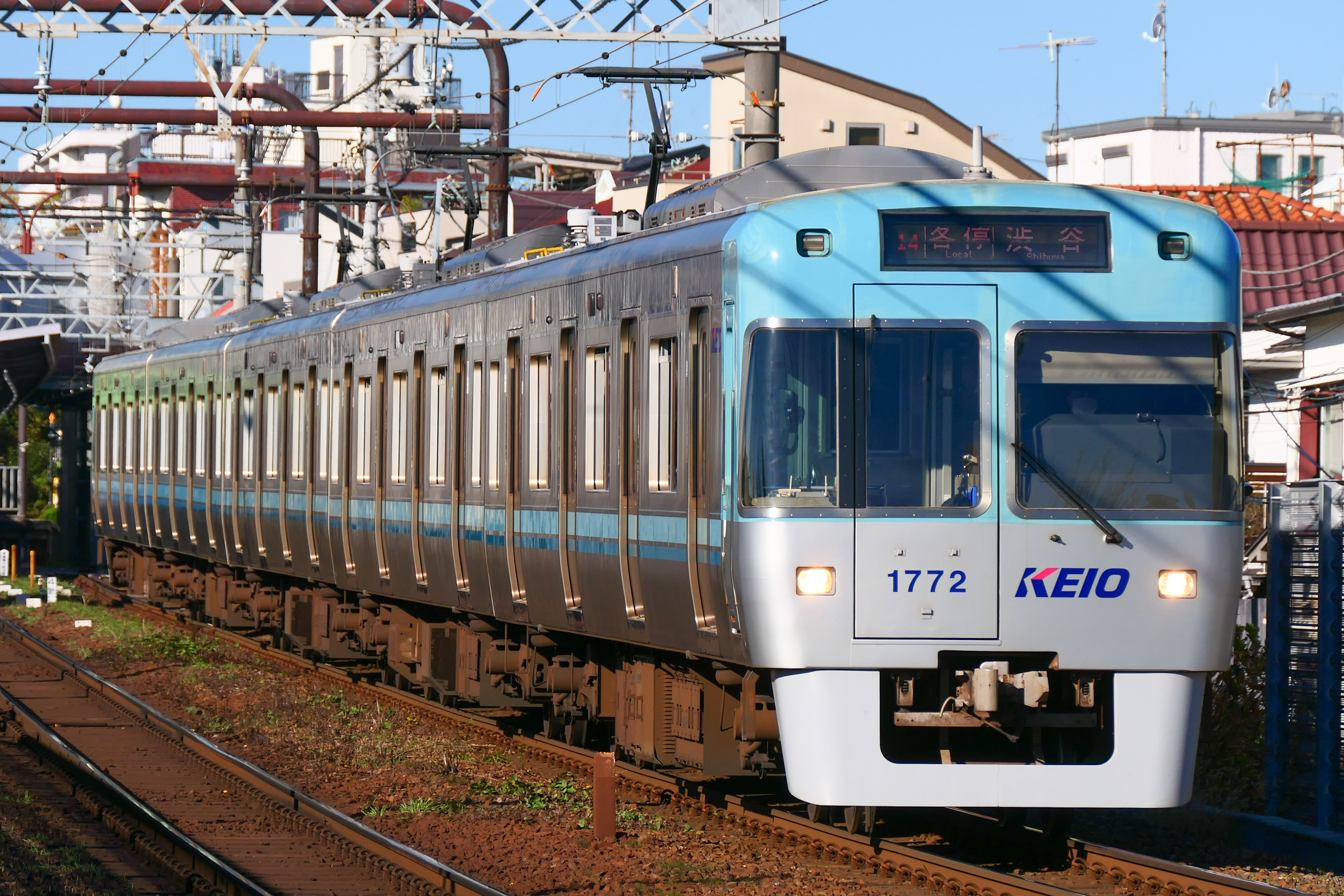
Blue-green set

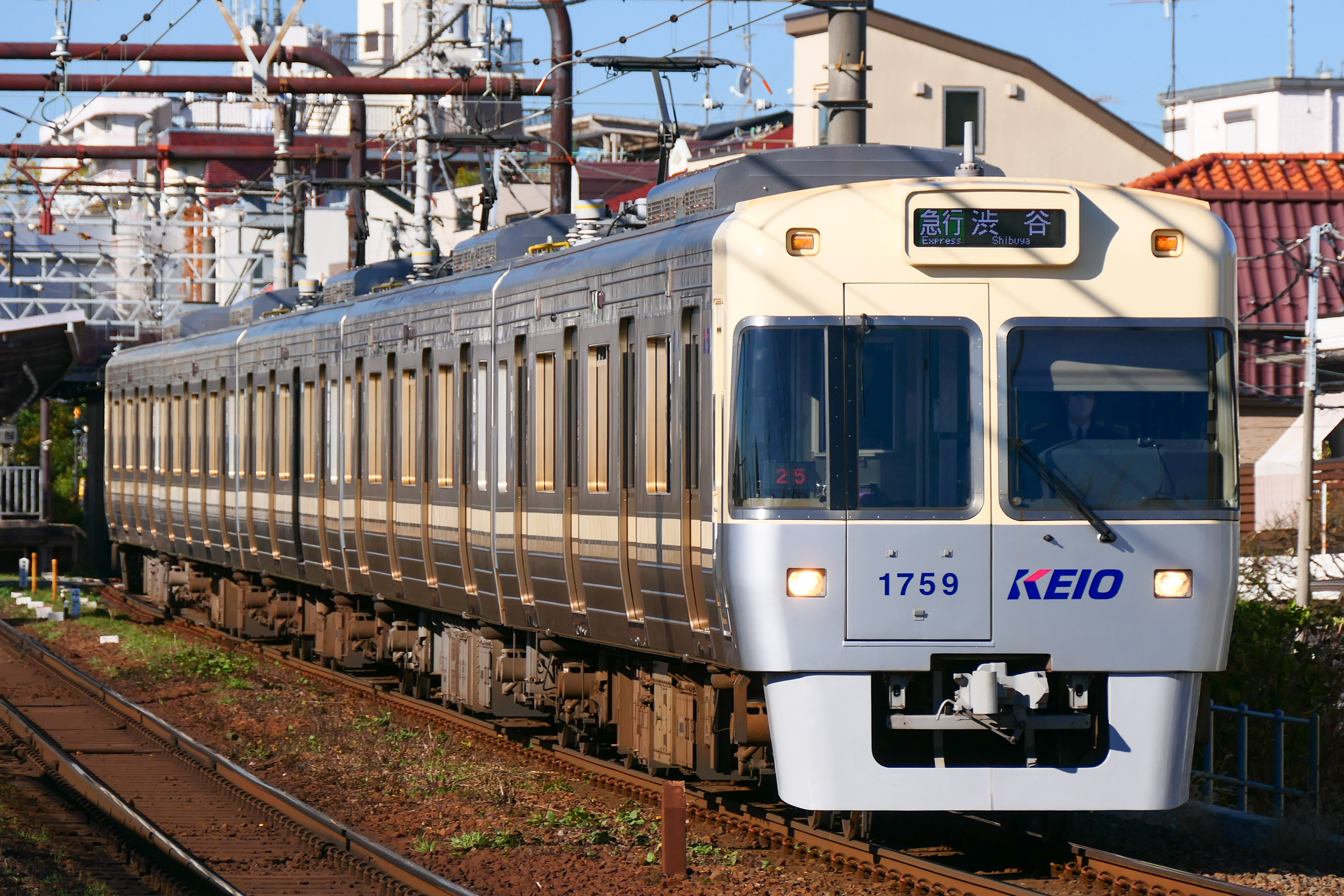
Ivory white set

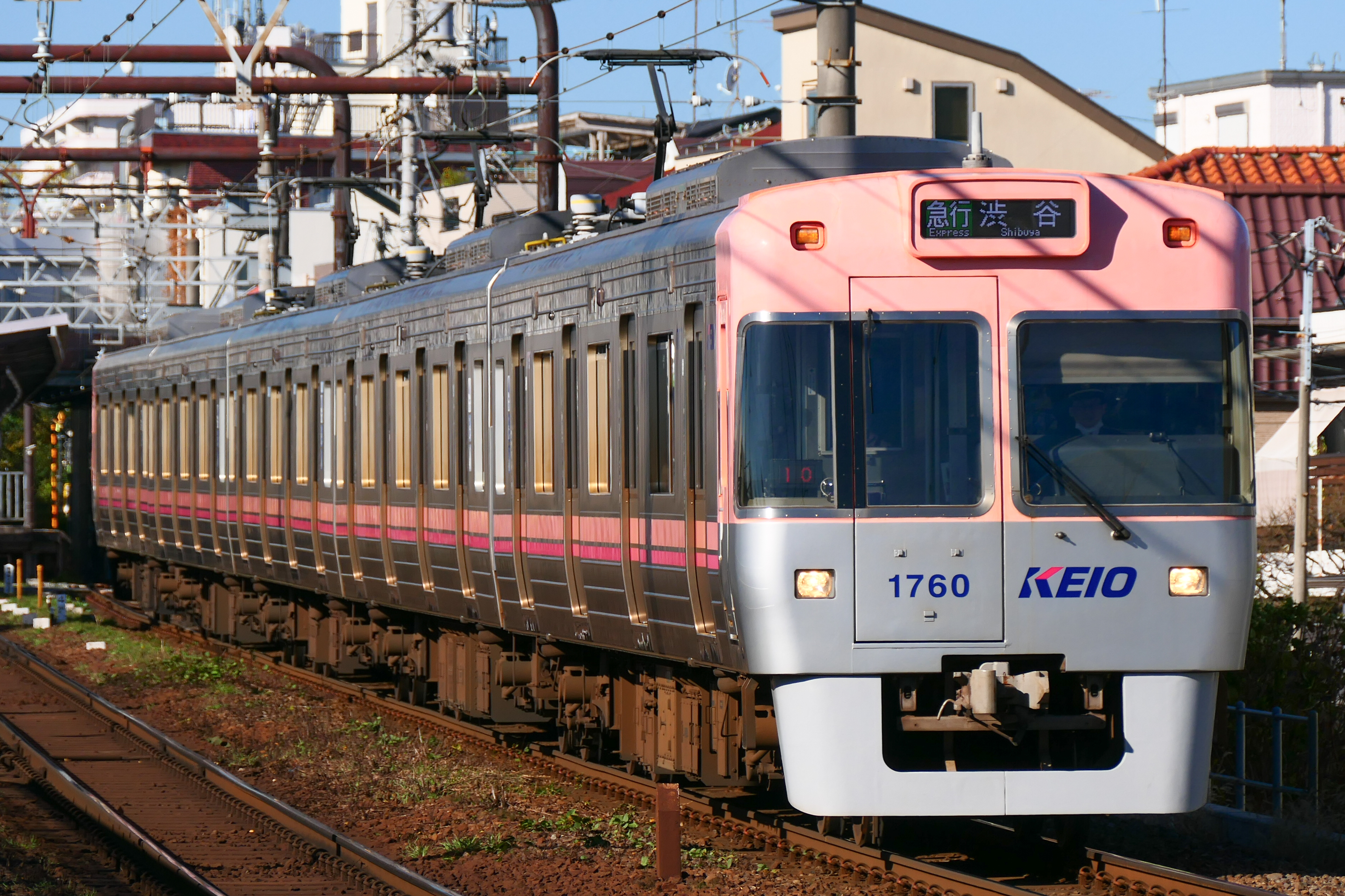
Salmon pink set

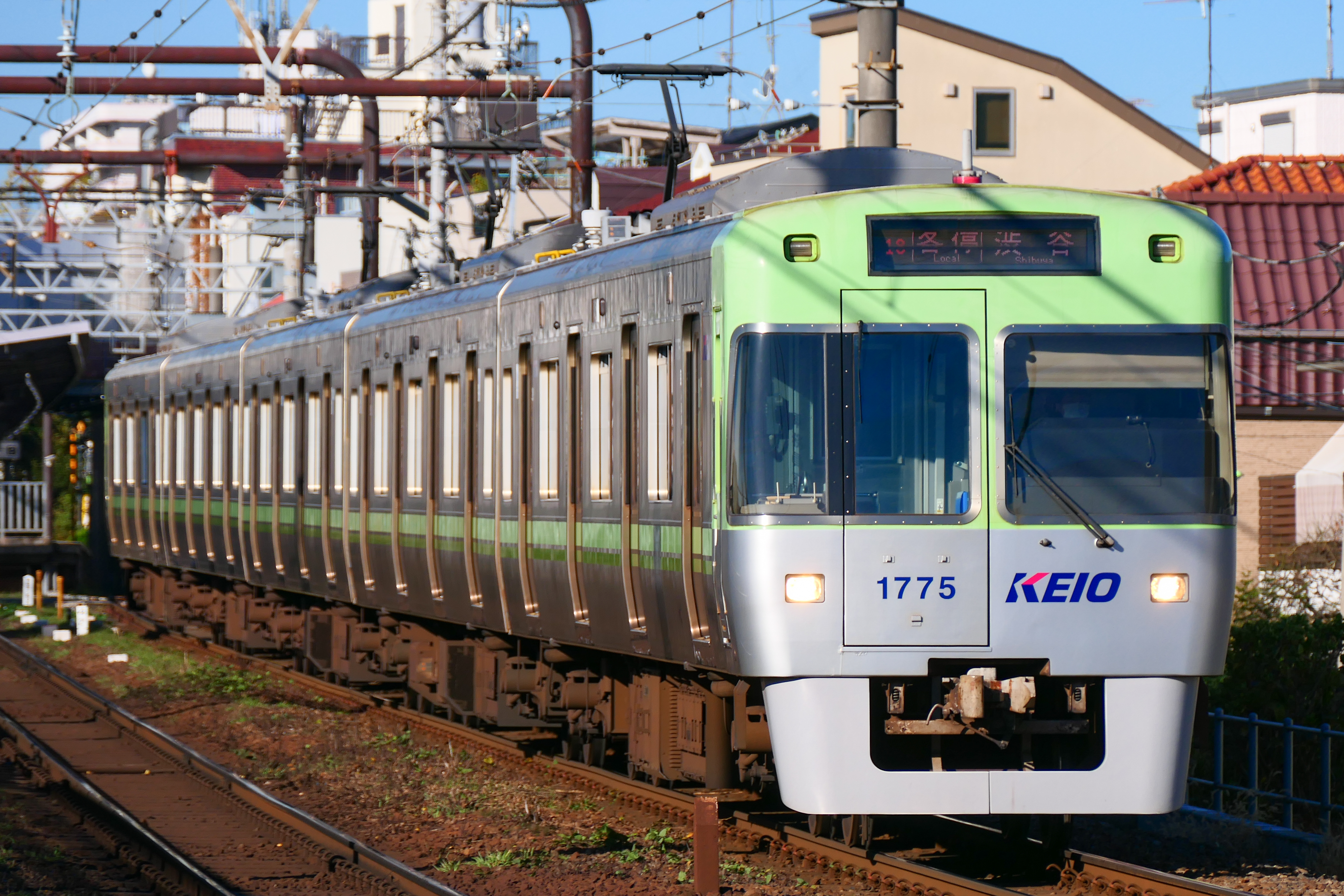
Light green set

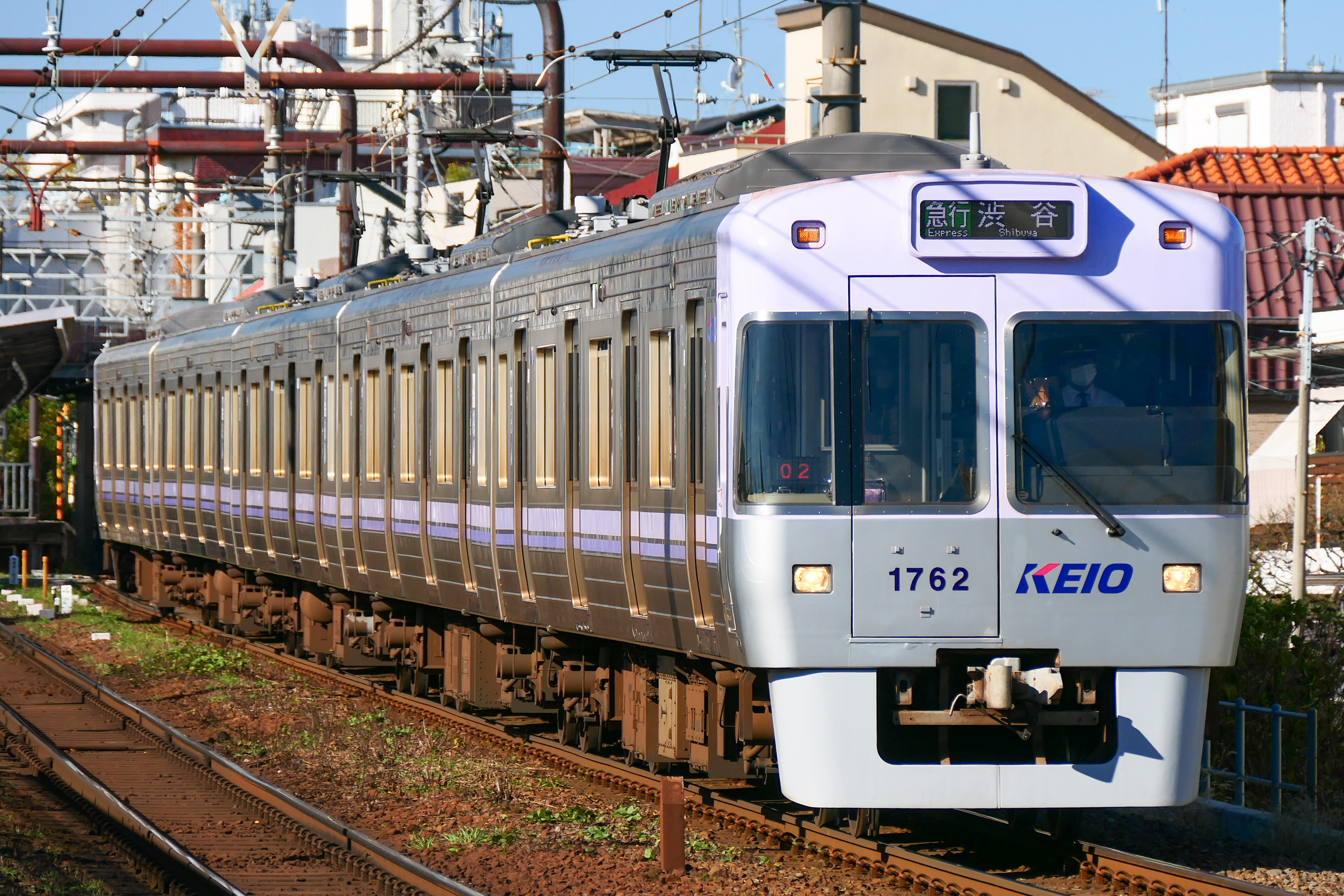
Violet set

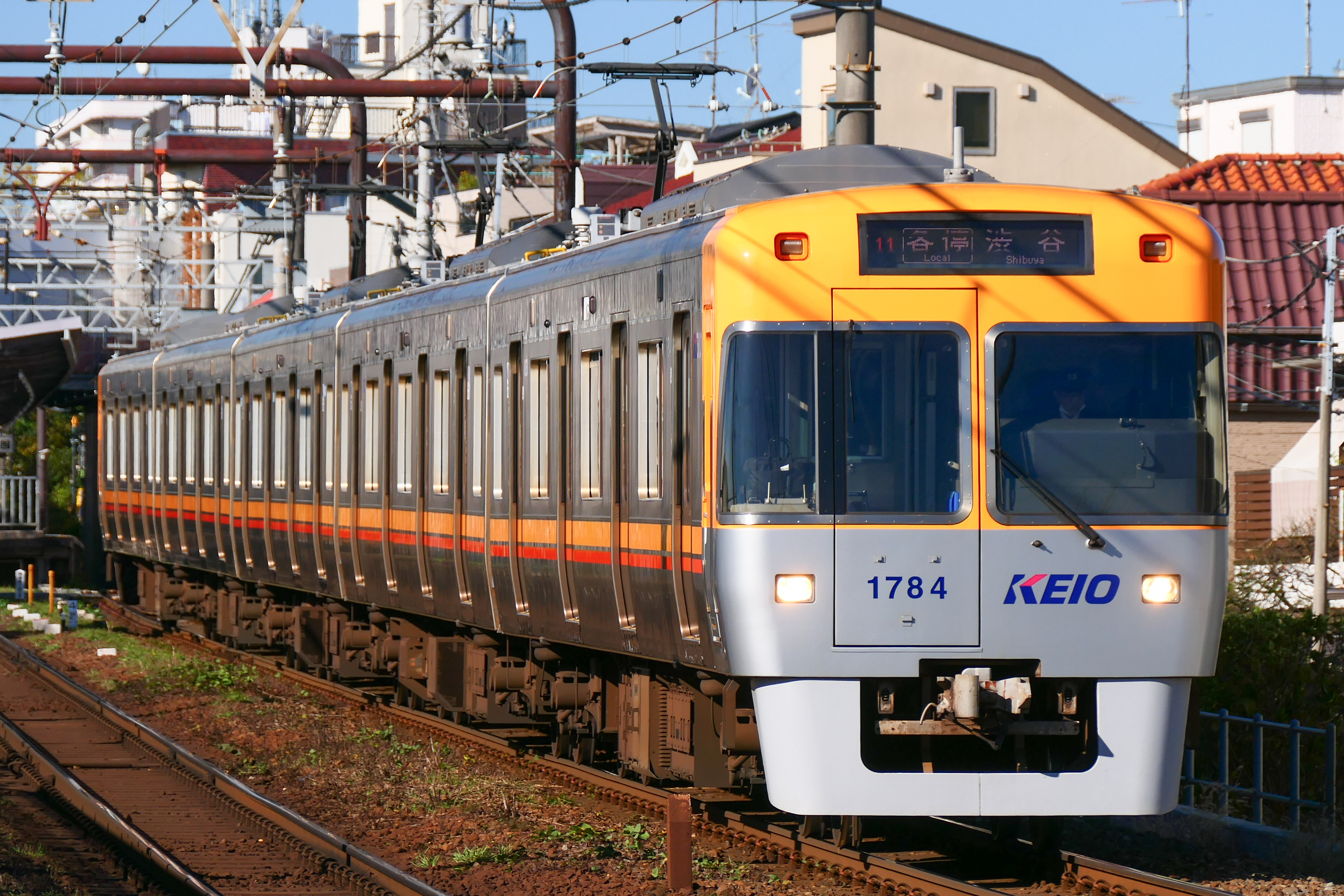
Orange-beige set

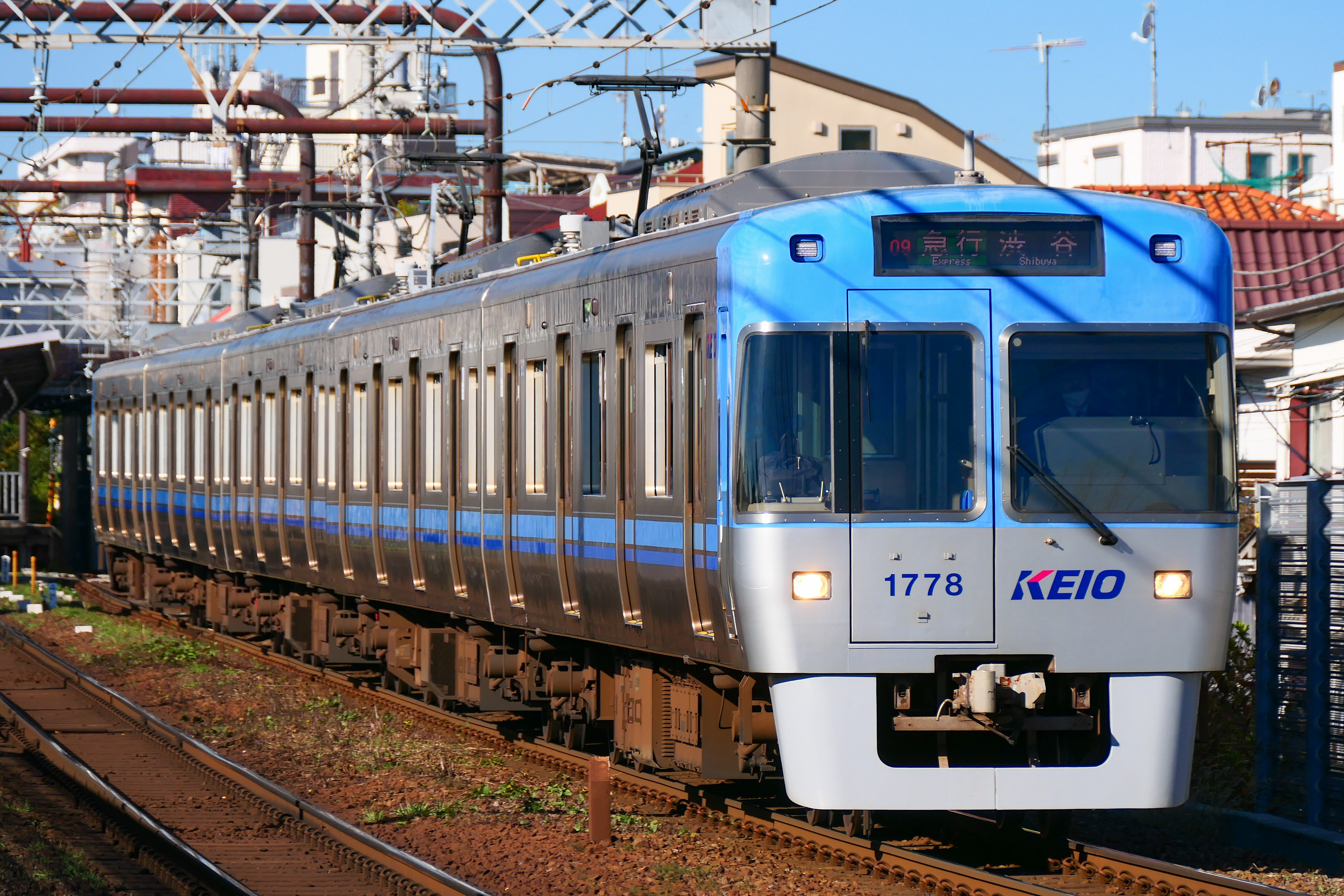
Light blue set

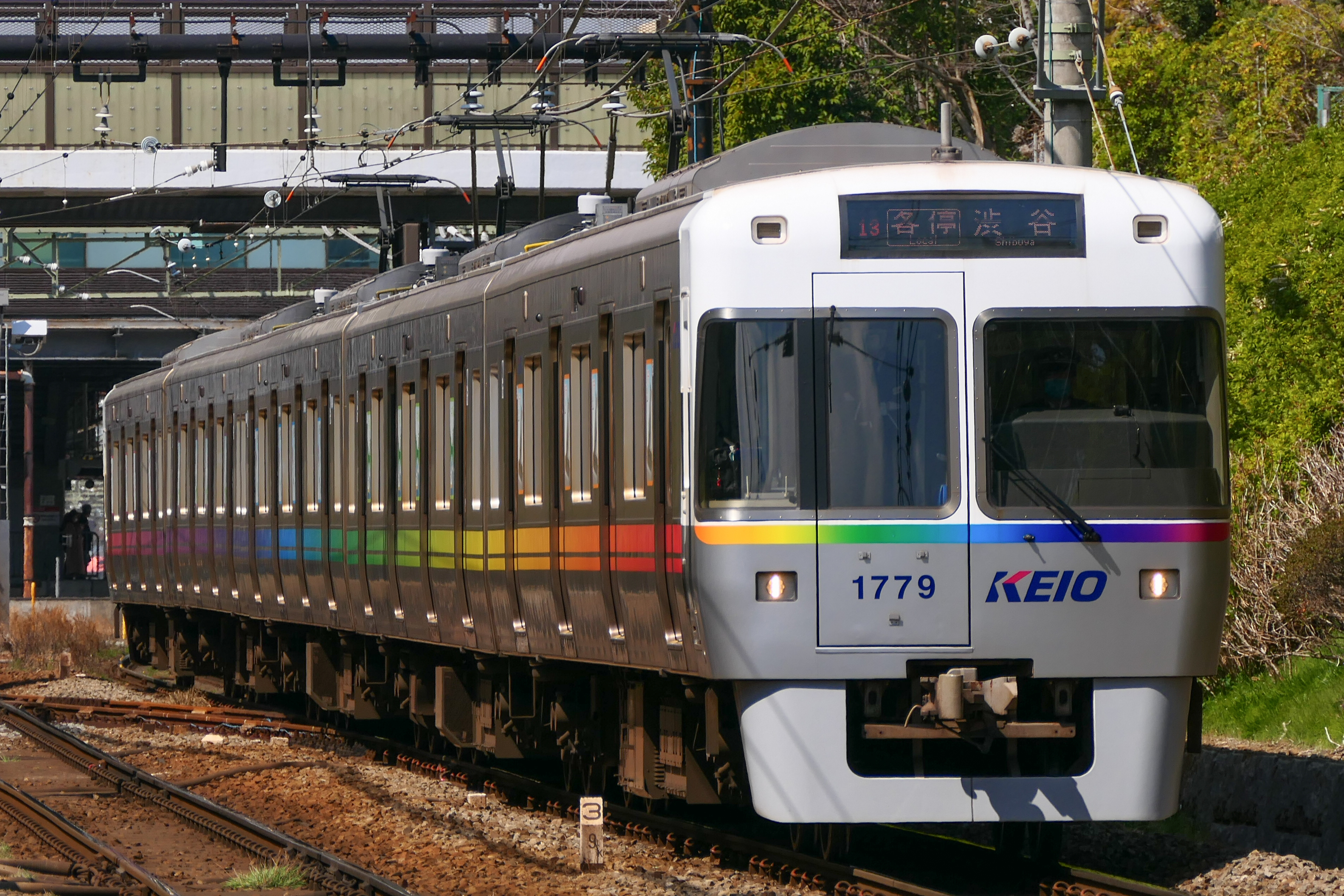
Rainbow set
