= Keio Inokashira Line =

Railway line in Tokyo, Japan

Inokashira Line

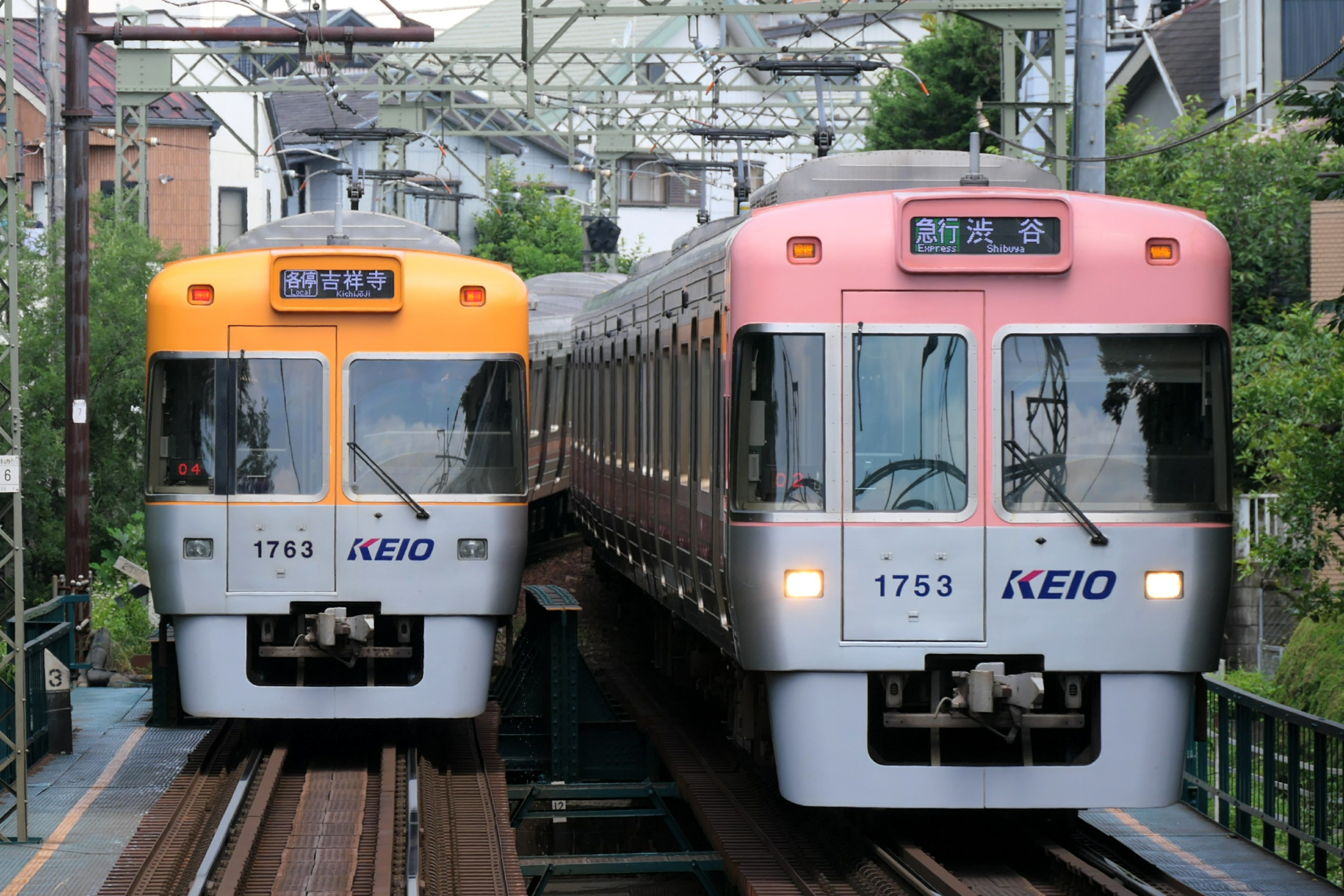
- Keio 1000 series EMUs on the Inokashira Line in June 2020

Overview
- Native name: 井の頭線
- Owner: Keio Corporation
- Locale: Tokyo
- Termini: Shibuya; Kichijōji
- Stations: 17

Service
- Type: Commuter rail
- Depot: Fujimigaoka
- Rolling stock: Keio 1000 series
- Daily ridership: 547,845 (2010)

History
- Opened: 1 August 1933; 93 years ago
- Last extension: 1 April 1934; 92 years ago

Technical
- Line length: 12.7 km (7.9 mi)
- Number of tracks: 2
- Track gauge: 1,067 mm (3 ft 6 in)
- Minimum radius: 200 m (660 ft)
- Electrification: Overhead line, 1,500 V DC
- Operating speed: 90 km/h (56 mph)

The Inokashira Line (Japanese: 井の頭線, Hepburn: Inokashira-sen) is a railway line operated by the Japanese private railway operator Keio Corporation in the western suburbs of Tokyo, connecting Shibuya in Tokyo with Kichijōji in Musashino City. It is not physically connected to the Keio Main Line Network, but a transfer is available at Meidaimae Station. This line is 1,067 mm (3 ft 6 in) gauge, unlike other Keio lines which are 1,372 mm (4 ft 6 in) gauge.

== Operation ==
Keio operates two types of trains on the line: all-stations "Local" (各停, Kakutei) or (Kakueki Teisha (各駅停車)) services and limited-stop Express (急行, Kyūkō) services. During the daytime off-peak, one local and one express operate every 8 minutes on the line.

== Stations ==
All stations are in Tokyo.

No.	Station	Distance in km (mi)	Express	Transfers	Location
IN-01	Shibuya 渋谷	0 (0)	●	Yamanote Line (JY20); Saikyō Line (JA10); Shōnan–Shinjuku Line (JS19); Tōyoko Line (TY01); Den-en-toshi Line (DT01); Ginza Line (G-01); Hanzōmon Line (Z-01); Fukutoshin Line (F-16)	Shibuya
IN-02	Shinsen 神泉	0.5 (0.31)	|		Shibuya
IN-03	Komaba-Tōdaimae 駒場東大前	1.4 (0.87)	|		Meguro
IN-04	Ikenoue 池ノ上	2.4 (1.5)	|		Setagaya
IN-05	Shimo-Kitazawa 下北沢	3.0 (1.9)	●	Odawara Line (OH07)	Setagaya
IN-06	Shindaita 新代田	3.5 (2.2)	|		Setagaya
IN-07	Higashi-Matsubara 東松原	4.0 (2.5)	|		Setagaya
IN-08	Meidaimae 明大前	4.9 (3.0)	●	Keiō Line (KO06)	Setagaya
IN-09	Eifukuchō 永福町	6.0 (3.7)	●		Suginami
IN-10	Nishi-Eifuku 西永福	6.7 (4.2)	|		Suginami
IN-11	Hamadayama 浜田山	7.5 (4.7)	|		Suginami
IN-12	Takaido 高井戸	8.7 (5.4)	|		Suginami
IN-13	Fujimigaoka 富士見ヶ丘	9.4 (5.8)	|		Suginami
IN-14	Kugayama 久我山	10.2 (6.3)	●		Suginami
IN-15	Mitakadai 三鷹台	11.2 (7.0)	|		Mitaka
IN-16	Inokashira-kōen 井の頭公園	12.1 (7.5)	|		Mitaka
IN-17	Kichijōji 吉祥寺	12.7 (7.9)	●	Chūō Line (JC11); Chūō–Sōbu Line (JB02)	Musashino

== History ==
The line opened in 1933, dual track connecting Shibuya in Tokyo to Inokashira-kōen, owned by Teito Electric Railway (帝都電鉄, Teito Dentetsu), part of the Odakyu Group. The track gauge used was the same 1,067 mm (3 ft 6 in) as for other Odakyu lines, and the overhead power supply was 600 V DC. The line was extended to Kichijōji in April 1934. In May 1940, the company merged with the Odakyu Electric Railway, and on 1 May 1942, Odakyu merged with Tokyo Yokohama Electric Railway (東京横浜電鉄) to become a part of Tokyo Kyuko Electric Railway (present-day Tokyu Corporation), with the Teito Line renamed the Inokashira Line.

After World War II, Greater Tokyu was divided, and the Inokashira Line came under Keio ownership.

A line known as the Daita Link Line (代田連絡線, Daita-renraku-sen) connected Daita-nichōme Station (now Shindaita Station) on the Inokashira Line with Setagaya-Nakahara Station (now Setagaya-Daita Station) on the Odakyū Odawara Line from June 1945, but this was closed in 1952. The track and overhead wire was entirely removed in 1953, although some traces of the trackbed remain today.

Two stations, Tōdaimae (東大前駅, Tōdaimae-eki) and Komaba (駒場駅, Komaba-eki), closed in July 1965 and were replaced by a new station, Komaba-Tōdaimae Station.

From 25 February 1969, following the voltage being increased to 1500 V DC, air-conditioned trains were introduced on the Inokashira Line. From 30 April 1971, the 3000 series trains were lengthened to 5-cars, and from 15 December 1971, limited-stop "Express" services started.

From 22 February 2013, station numbering was introduced on Keio lines. Inokashira Line stations were numbered prefixed with the letters "IN".

== Rolling stock ==
- Keio 1000 series 5-car EMUs (since 9 January 1996)
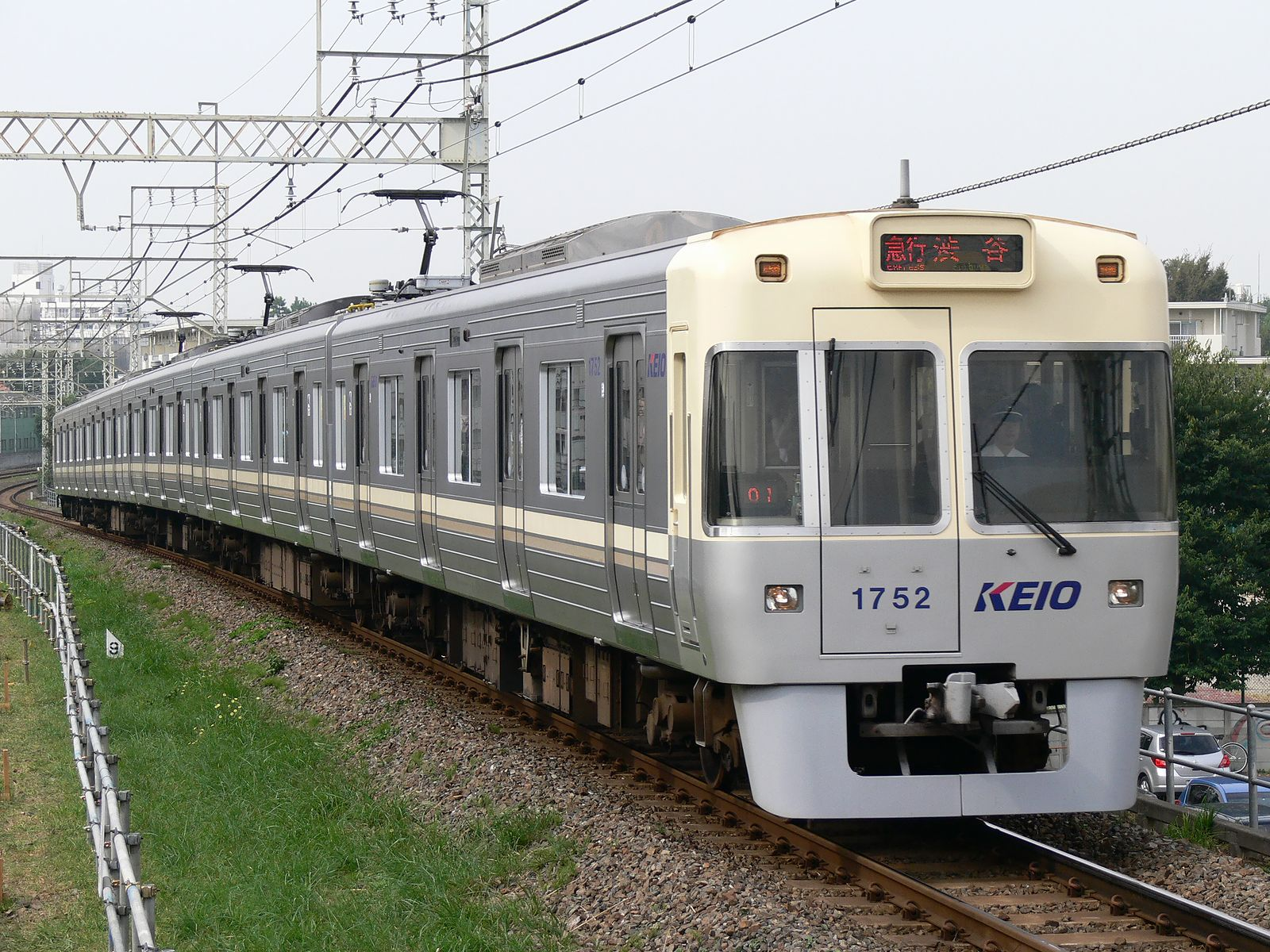
1000 series EMU, October 2008

=== Former rolling stock ===
- Keio 3000 series 5-car EMUs (30 December 1962 – 2011)
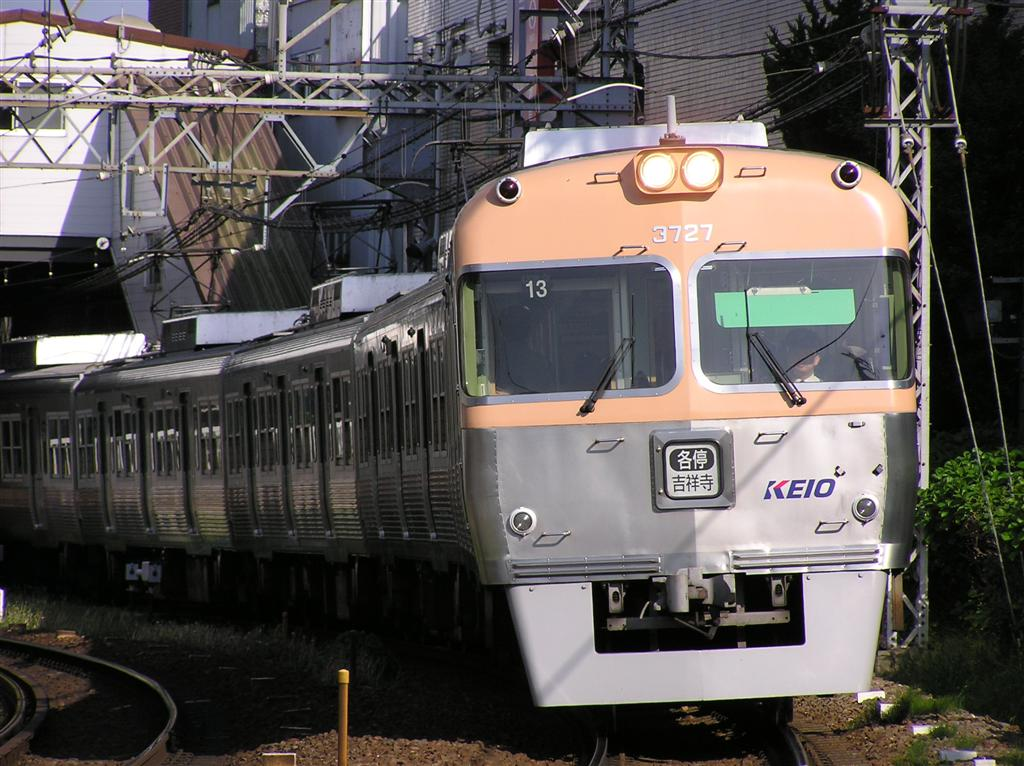
3000 series EMU, May 2006

== See also ==
- List of railway lines in Japan
