= Meidaimae Station =

Railway station in Tokyo, Japan

Meidaimae Station 明大前駅

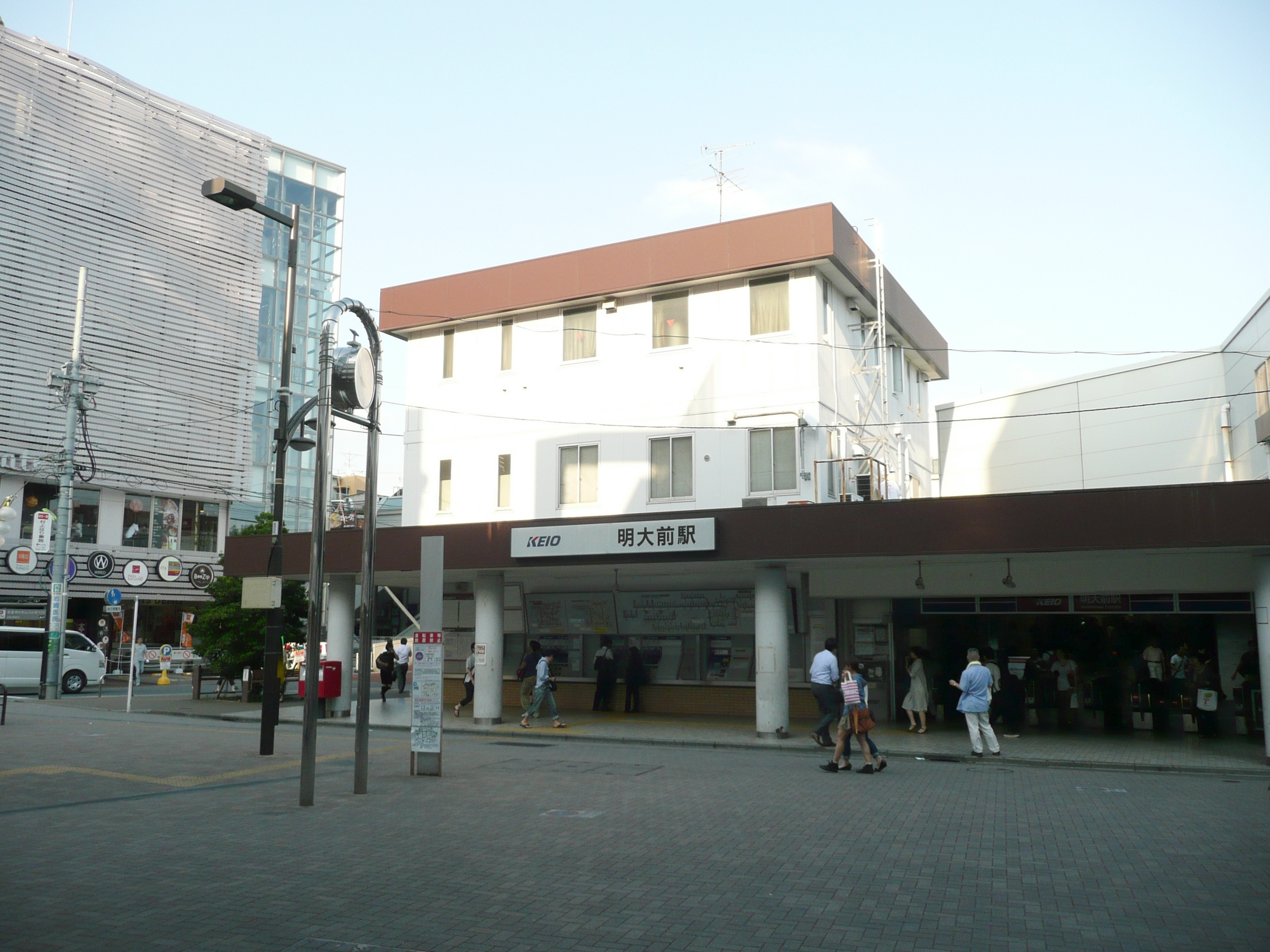
- Station entrance, September 2011

General information
- Location: 2-45-1 Matsubara, Setagaya, Tokyo; Japan
- Coordinates: 35°40′06″N 139°39′02″E
- Operator: Keio Corporation
- Lines: Keiō Line; Inokashira Line

Other information
- Station code: KO06 (Keiō Line); IN08 (Inokashira line)

History
- Opened: 15 April 1913; 113 years ago
- Former names: Kayakukomae; Matsubara (until 1935)

Passengers
- FY2016: 107,394 daily

Services
Preceding station	Keio Corporation	Following station
Takaosanguchi Terminus	Keiō Line Mt Takao	Shinjuku Terminus
Fuchū One-way operation	Keiō Line Mt Takao	Shinjuku Terminus
Chitose-karasuyama towards Keiō-hachiōji	Keiō Line Special Express	Sasazuka towards Shinjuku
Sakurajōsui towards Keiō-hachiōji	Keiō Line Express Semi Express	Sasazuka towards Shinjuku
Shimo-takaido towards Keiō-hachiōji	Keiō Line Rapid	Sasazuka towards Shinjuku
Shimo-takaido towards Keiō-hachiōji	Keiō Line Local	Daitabashi towards Shinjuku
Eifukuchō towards Kichijōji	Inokashira Line Express	Shimo-kitazawa towards Shibuya
Eifukuchō towards Kichijōji	Inokashira Line Local	Higashi-matsubara towards Shibuya
Location
- Location within Special wards of Tokyo Location within Japan

Meidaimae Station (明大前駅, Meidaimae-eki) is a railway station in Setagaya, Tokyo, Japan, operated by the private railway operator Keio Corporation.

== Lines ==
Meidaimae Station is served by the Keio Line from Shinjuku in Tokyo, and by the 12.7 km Keio Inokashira Line from Shibuya in Tokyo to Kichijōji. On the Keio Line, it is located between Daitabashi and Shimo-Takaido, it is 5.2 km from the Shinjuku terminus. On the Inokashira Line, it is located between Higashi-Matsubara and Eifukuchō, it is 4.9 km from the Shibuya terminus.

In addition, "meidai" in the station name is an abbreviation for Meiji University, from which the station is named, and "mae" indicates spatial proximity, similar to "front" in English.

== Station layout ==
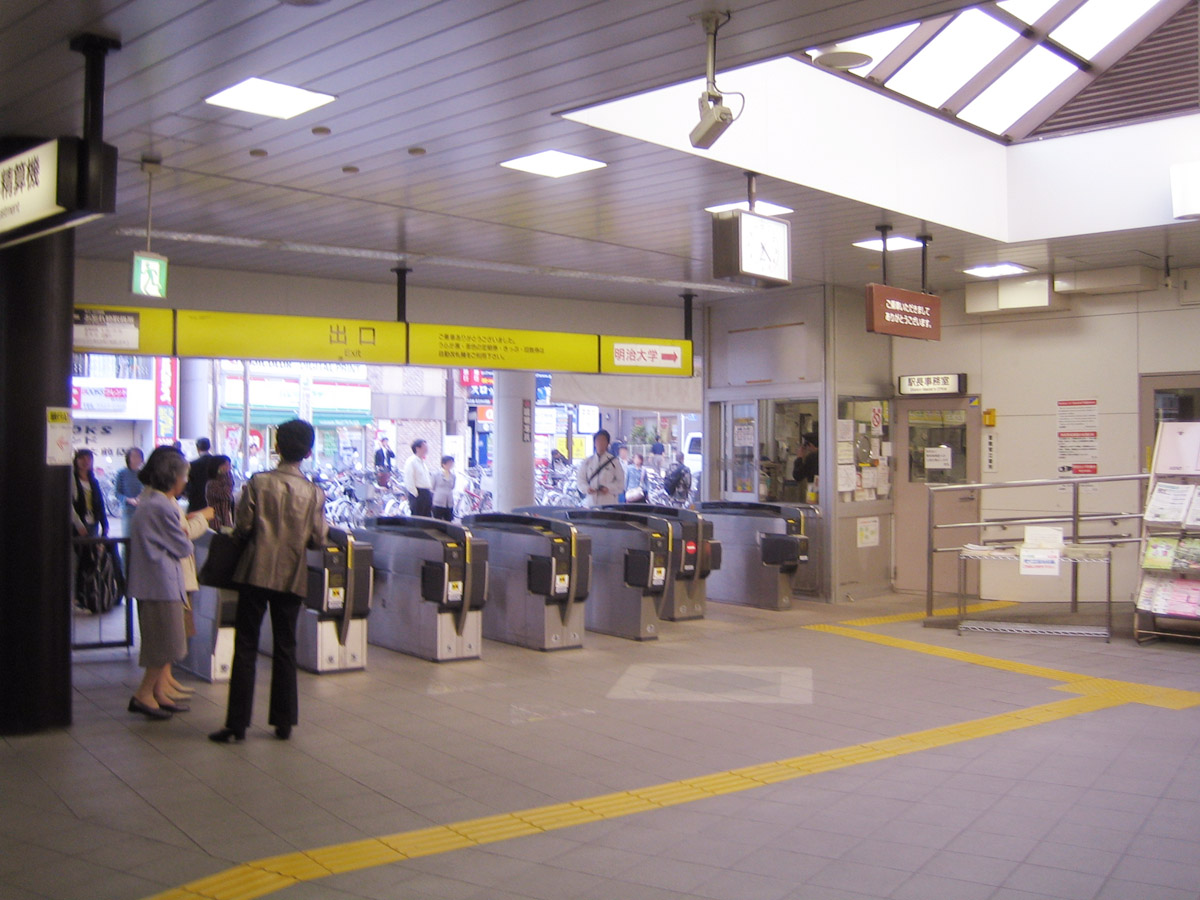
The ticket barriers, May 2006

Meidaimae Station has three floors:

- 2F: Keio Line platforms
- 1F: Ticket gates
- B1F: Keio Inokashira Line platforms

Both lines have two opposing side platforms serving two sets of tracks.

There are upward-only escalators between the Inokashira Line platforms and the concourse. Between the Inokashira Line platform and the Keiō Line platform, on the east end is an upward-only escalator, and on the west end is a downward-only escalator. There are elevators between the Inokashira Line Kichijoji-bound platform and the concourse, between the concourse and the Keio line down platform, between the Inokashira Line Shibuya-bound platform and the concourse, and between the concourse and the Keio Line up line platform.

There are toilets on the first floor, inside the ticket gates, including multi-purpose toilets.

On March 31, 2007, a new ticket gate was opened in the middle section of the Inokashira Line Kichijoji-bound platform, called Frente Exit (フレンテ口, furente guchi). This exit is exit-only, and connects directly to the shopping building Frente Meidaimae (フレンテ明大前, Frente Meidaimae), connected to the station, which opened on May 24 of the same year, run by the Keio Group. The roof covering the Kichijoji-bound platform is attached to the first floor of this building. Additionally, some of the Frente Meidaimae stores are on (that is, face and open onto) the Kichijoji-bound platform.

In February 2001, a solar panel system was installed on the station roof, with the electricity generated used to power the lights in the station. This system was installed with cooperation from the New Energy and Industrial Technology Development Organization, and generates up to 30 kW.

=== Platforms ===
1	Keiō Line	for Chōfu and Keiō-Hachiōji; Keiō Sagamihara Line for Hashimoto (via Chōfu); Keiō Takao Line for Takaosanguchi (via Kitano)
2	Keiō Line	for Sasazuka and Shinjuku; Keiō New Line for Shinjuku; Toei Shinjuku Line for Moto-Yawata
3	Keiō Inokashira Line	for Eifukuchō and Kichijōji
4	Keiō Inokashira Line	for Shimo-Kitazawa and Shibuya

== History ==
The station first opened on 15 April 1913 as Kayakukomae Station (火薬庫前駅). This was renamed Matsubara Station (松原駅) in 1917, and again renamed Meidaimae on 8 February 1935. The Inokashira Line platforms opened on 1 August 1933.

From 22 February 2013, station numbering was introduced on Keio lines, with Meidaimae Station becoming "KO06" on the Keio Line and "IN08" on the Inokashira Line.

== Surrounding area ==
- Meiji University Izumi Campus
