= Kichijōji Station =

Railway station in Musashino, Tokyo, Japan

Kichijōji Station 吉祥寺駅
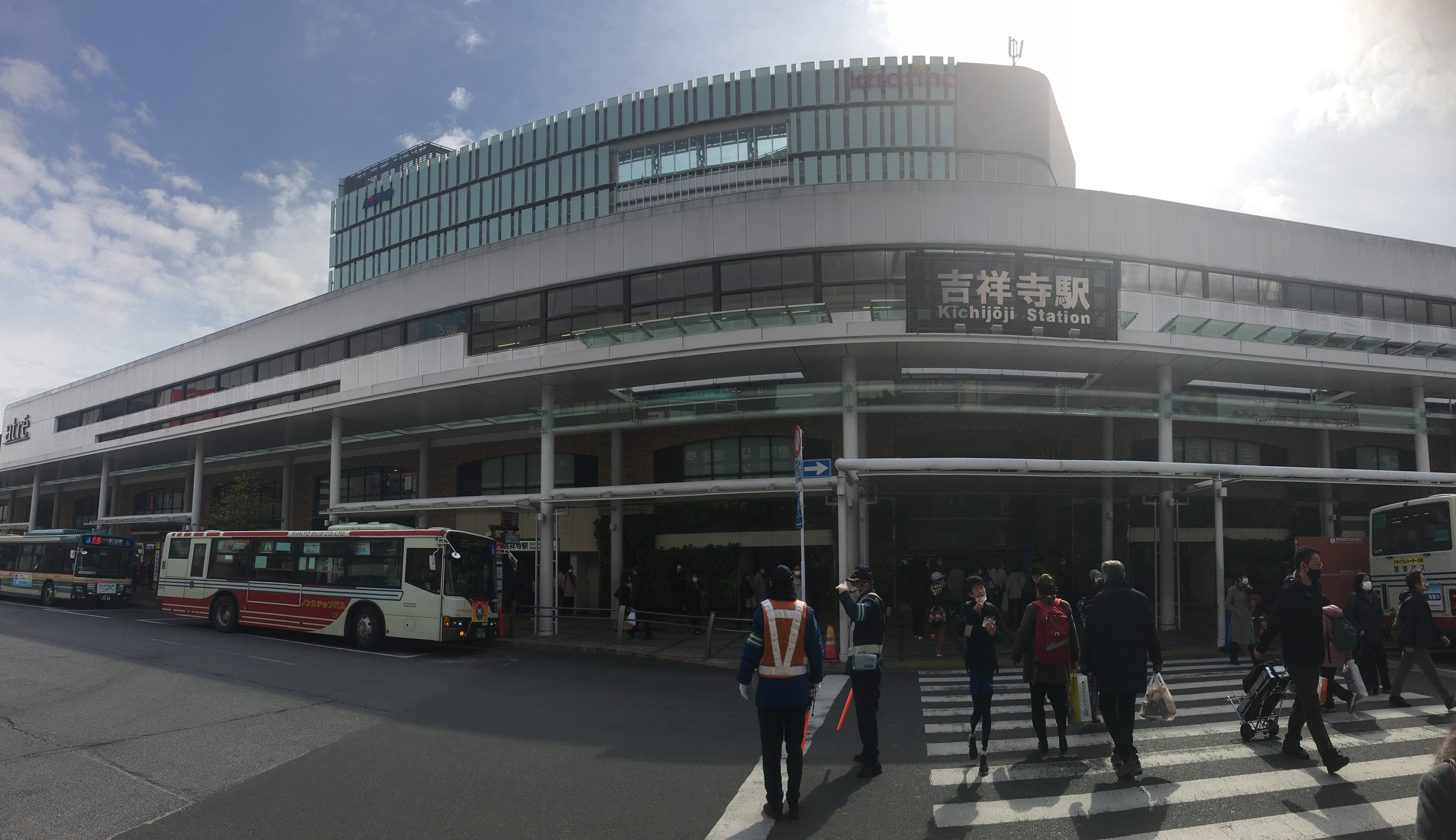
- The north side of the station in February 2022

General information
- Location: Kichijōji-Minami-cho, Musashino, Tokyo; Japan
- Coordinates: 35°42′10″N 139°34′47″E
- Operator: JR East; Keio Corporation
- Lines: ■ Chūō-Sōbu Line; ■ Chūō Line (Rapid); Keio Inokashira Line
- Connections: Bus terminal

History
- Opened: 30 December 1899; 126 years ago
Location
- Location within Tokyo Location within Japan

Kichijōji Station (吉祥寺駅, Kichijōji-eki) is an interchange passenger railway station serving Kichijōji in the city of Musashino, Tokyo, Japan, operated by East Japan Railway Company (JR East) and the private railway operator Keio Corporation.

== Lines ==
Kichijōji Station is located on the JR East Chūō Main Line, and is served by all-stations Chūō-Sōbu Line services from Chiba and some Chūō Line (Rapid) limited-stop services from Tokyo. It also forms a terminus of the Keio Inokashira Line and is located 12.7 kilometers from the opposing terminus at Shibuya in Tokyo. The station is 14 minutes from Shinjuku and 28 minutes from Tokyo by Chuo Line rapid service, and 23 minutes from Shibuya by Inokashira Line express service.

== JR East ==
JC11 JB02 Kichijōji Station 吉祥寺駅
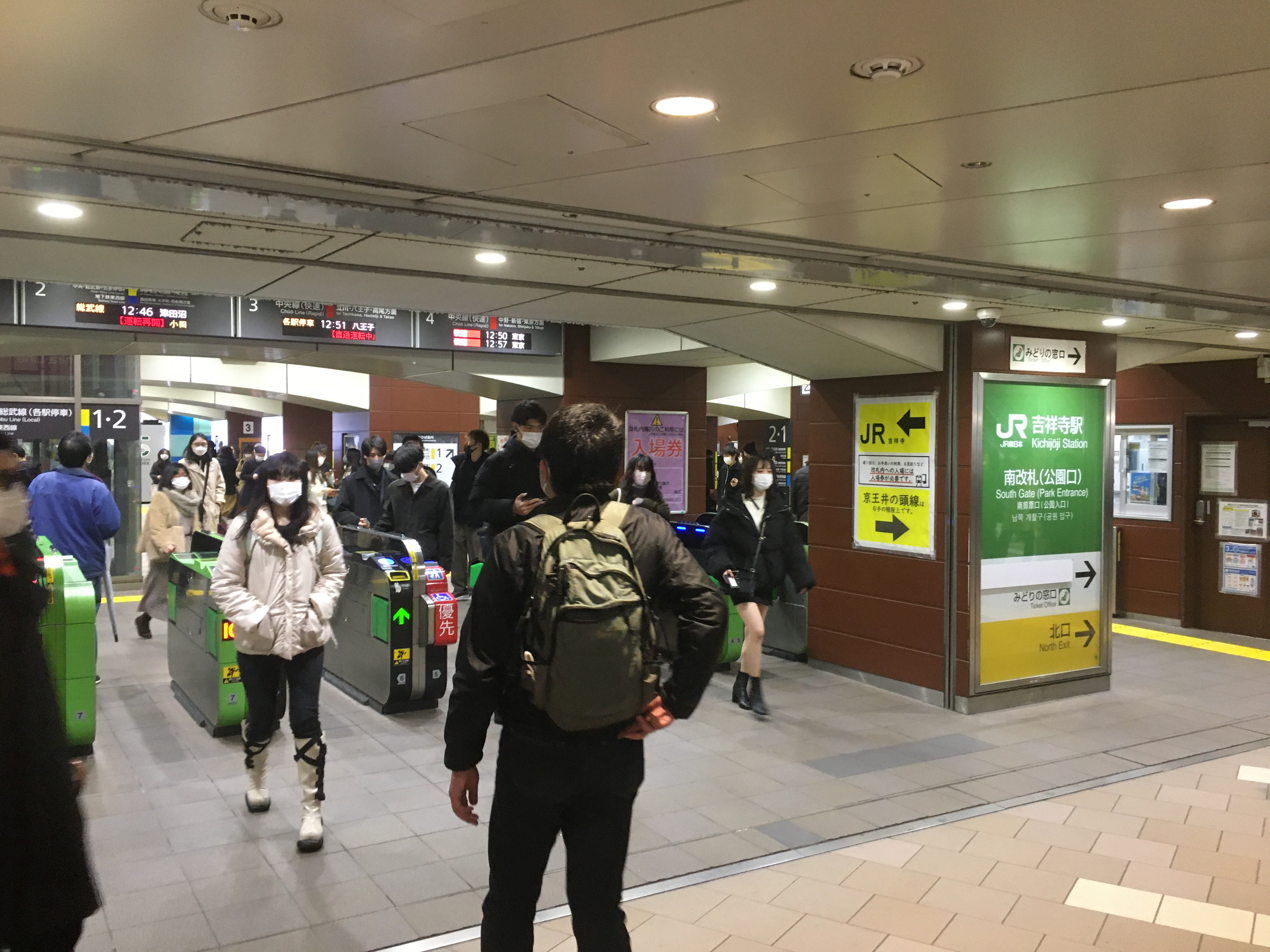
- JR East entrance, February 2022

General information
- Location: 1 Kichijōji Minami-chō, Musashino-shi, Tokyo （東京都武蔵野市吉祥寺南町1丁目） Japan
- Operator: JR East
- Lines: ■ Chūō-Sōbu Line; ■ Chūō Line (Rapid)
- Distance: 22.5 km from Tokyo
- Platforms: 2 island platforms
- Tracks: 4

Construction
- Structure type: Elevated

Other information
- Status: Staffed ( "Midori no Madoguchi")

History
- Opened: 30 December 1899

Passengers
- FY2024: 256,492 (daily)

Services
Preceding station	JR East	Following station
Mitaka JC12 towards Ōtsuki	Chūō Line Commuter Rapid	Ogikubo One-way operation
Mitaka JC12 towards Ōtsuki	Chūō Line Rapid	Ogikubo JC09 (weekends) towards Tokyo
Mitaka JC12 towards Ōtsuki	Chūō Line Rapid	Nishi-Ogikubo JC10 (weekdays) towards Tokyo
Mitaka JB01 Terminus	Chūō–Sōbu Line	Nishi-Ogikubo JB03 towards Chiba
Mitaka JB01 Terminus	Chūō–Sōbu Line via Tōzai Line	Nishi-Ogikubo JB03 towards Tsudanuma
Location

=== Station layout ===
The JR East station consists of two elevated island platforms serving four tracks. It has a "Midori no Madoguchi" staffed ticket office and a "View Plaza" travel agent.

=== Platforms ===
1	Chūō-Sōbu Line	for Mitaka
2	Chūō-Sōbu Line	for Shinjuku, Akihabara, and Chiba; Tokyo Metro Tozai Line for Ōtemachi and Nishi-funabashi (via Nakano)
3	Chūō Line (Rapid)	for Tachikawa, Hachiōji, and Takao
4	Chūō Line (Rapid)	for Nakano, Shinjuku, and Tokyo

== Keio ==
Kichijōji Station 吉祥寺駅

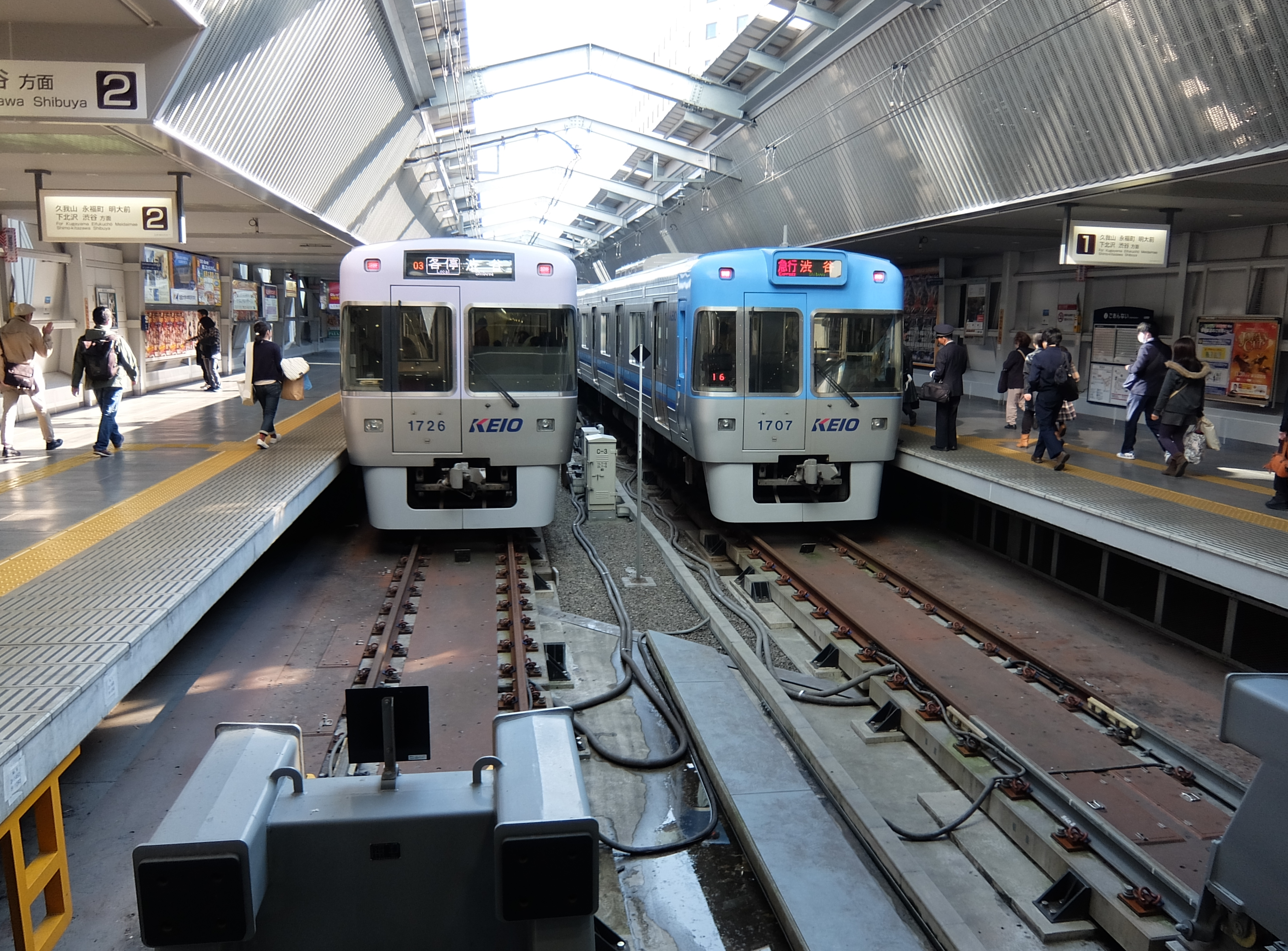
- The Keio Inokashira Line platforms, November 2014

General information
- System: Keio station
- Operator: Keio Corporation
- Line: Keio Inokashira Line
- Distance: 12.7 km from Shibuya
- Platforms: 2 side platforms
- Tracks: 2

History
- Opened: 1 April 1934

Passengers
- FY2024: 127,213 (daily)

Services
Preceding station	Keio Corporation	Following station
Terminus	Inokashira Line Express	Kugayama towards Shibuya
Terminus	Inokashira Line Local	Inokashira-kōen towards Shibuya
Location

=== Station layout ===
The Keio station consists of two elevated side platforms serving two terminating tracks.

=== Platforms ===
1, 2	Keio Inokashira Line	for Meidaimae and Shibuya

== History ==
Kichijōji Station opened on 30 December 1899. The Keio station opened on 1 April 1934.

From 22 February 2013, station numbering was introduced on Keio lines, with Kichijōji Station becoming "IN17".

In 2017, the city of Musashino erected a statue of Hanako, a deceased elephant from the local Inokashira Park Zoo, by the northern exit. The statue was paid for by donations and, in subsequent years, dressed up as part of the mid-winter light festivals.

== Passenger statistics ==
In fiscal 2019, the JR station was used by an average of 141,849 passengers daily (boarding passengers only) making it the 22nd busiest JR East station. Over the same fiscal year, the Keio station was used by an average of 146,901 passengers daily (exiting and entering passengers).

The passenger figures for previous years are as shown below.

Fiscal year	Daily average (JR East)	Daily average (Keio)
1999	-	140,685
2005	139,245	-
2006	140,155	-
2007	143,932	-
2008	143,178	-
2009	141,314	-
2010	138,420	142,083
2011	137,555	140,929
2012	138,483	141,475
2013	139,282	139,679

- Note that JR East figures are for boarding passengers only.

== Surrounding area ==
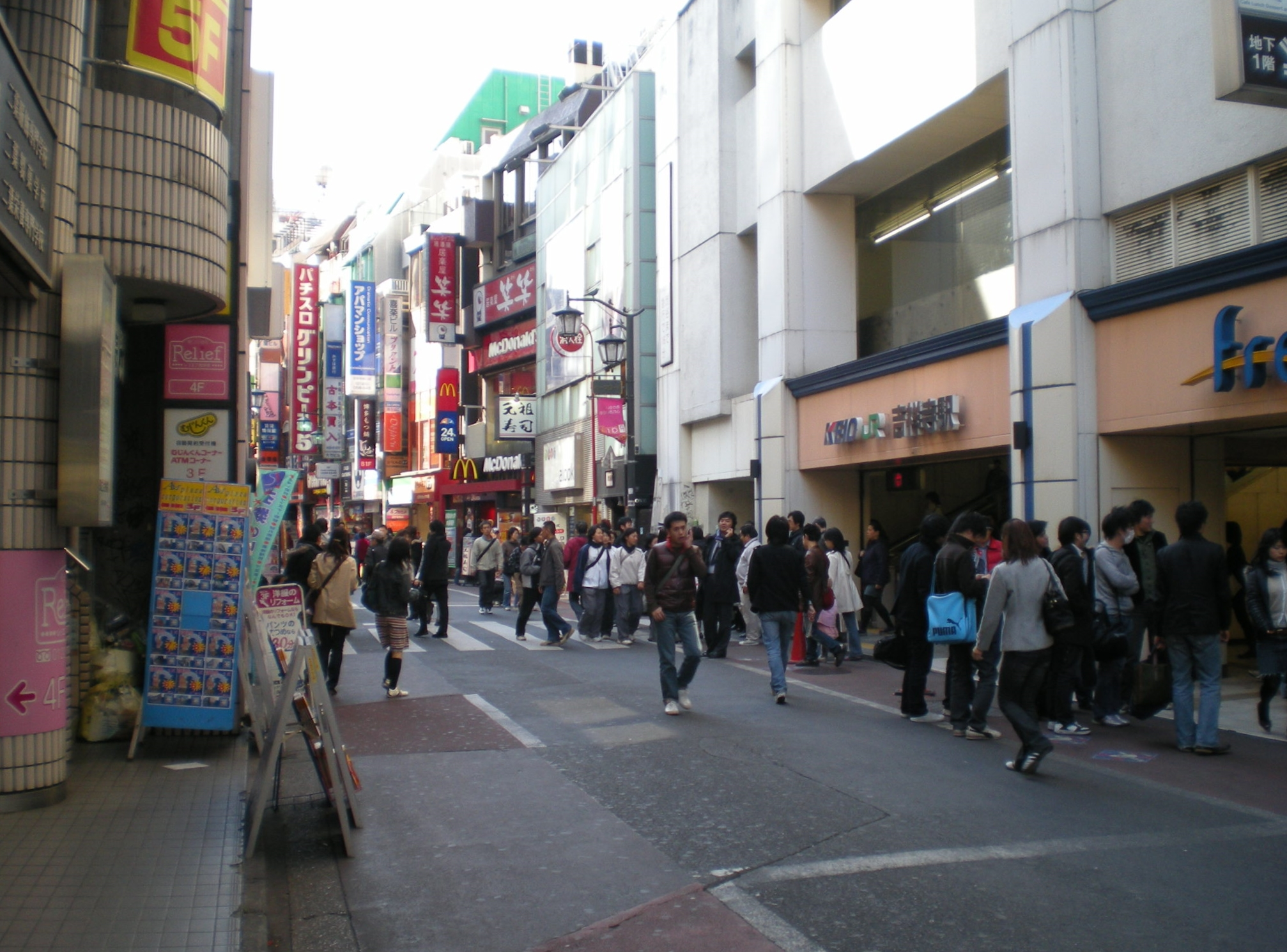
The south entrance to the station in March 2008

- Inokashira Park

== See also ==
- List of railway stations in Japan
