= Takaido Station =

Railway station in Suginami, Tokyo, Japan

Takaido Station 高井戸駅

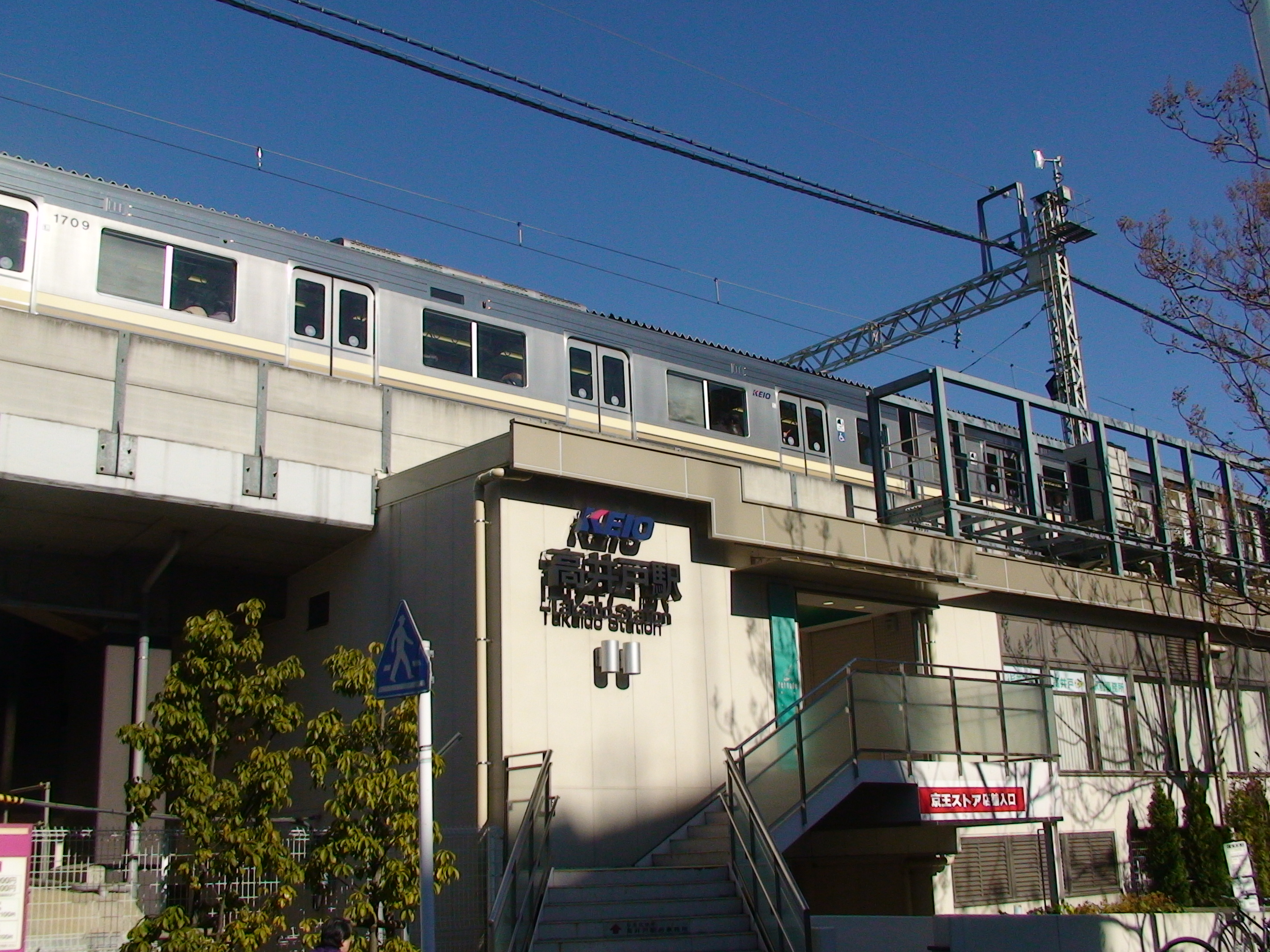
- Station building under the tracks

General information
- Location: Suginami, Tokyo; Japan
- Coordinates: 35°41′00″N 139°36′55″E
- Operator: Keio Corporation
- Line: Keio Inokashira Line
- Connections: Bus stop

Other information
- Station code: IN12

History
- Opened: August 1, 1933; 93 years ago

Passengers
- FY2011: 41,374 daily

Services
Preceding station	Keio Corporation	Following station
Fujimigaoka towards Kichijōji	Inokashira Line Local	Hamadayama towards Shibuya
Location

Takaido Station (高井戸駅, Takaido-eki) is a railway station on the Keio Inokashira Line in Suginami, Tokyo, Japan, operated by the private railway operator Keio Corporation.

== Lines ==
Takaido Station is served by the 12.7 km Keio Inokashira Line from Shibuya in Tokyo to Kichijōji. Located between Hamadayama and Fujimigaoka, it is 8.7 km from the Shibuya terminus.

== Service pattern ==
Only all-stations "Local" services stop at this station. During the daytime, there are eight services per hour in either direction.

== Station layout ==
The station consists of a single elevated island platform serving two tracks.

In December 2006, renovation of the Keio Retnade shopping center below the station was completed.

=== Platforms ===
1	Keio Inokashira Line	for Kugayama and Kichijōji
2	Keio Inokashira Line	for Shimo-Kitazawa, Meidaimae, and Shibuya

== History ==
The station opened on 1 August 1933. It was rebuilt as an elevated station, reopening on 15 March 1972.

From 22 February 2013, station numbering was introduced on Keio lines, with Takaido Station becoming "IN12".

== Passenger statistics ==
In fiscal 2011, the station was used by an average of 41,374 passengers daily.

The passenger figures for previous years are as shown below.

Fiscal year	Daily average
1999	37,374
2010	41,984
2011	41,374
