= Hamadayama Station =

Railway station in Suginami, Tokyo, Japan

Hamadayama Station 浜田山駅

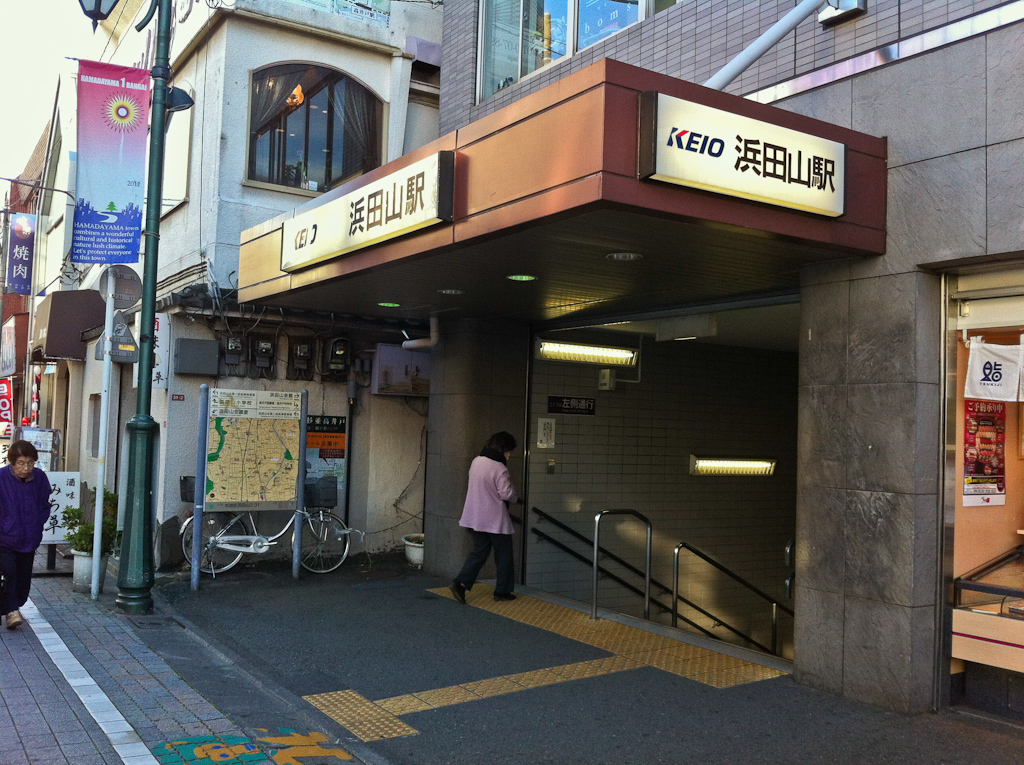
- Station entrance, November 2012

General information
- Location: Suginami, Tokyo; Japan
- Coordinates: 35°40′54″N 139°37′39″E
- Operator: Keio Corporation
- Line: Keio Inokashira Line
- Connections: Bus stop

Other information
- Station code: IN11

History
- Opened: August 1, 1933; 93 years ago

Passengers
- FY2011: 28,169 daily

Services
Preceding station	Keio Corporation	Following station
Takaido towards Kichijōji	Inokashira Line Local	Nishi-eifuku towards Shibuya
Location

Hamadayama Station (浜田山駅, Hamadayama-eki) is a railway station on the Keio Inokashira Line in Suginami, Tokyo, Japan, operated by the private railway operator Keio Corporation.

== Lines ==
Hamadayama Station is served by the 12.7 km Keio Inokashira Line from Shibuya in Tokyo to Kichijōji. Located between Nishi-Eifuku and Takaido, it is 7.5 km from the Shibuya terminus.

== Service pattern ==
Only all-stations "Local" services stop at this station. During the daytime, there are eight services per hour in either direction.

== Station layout ==
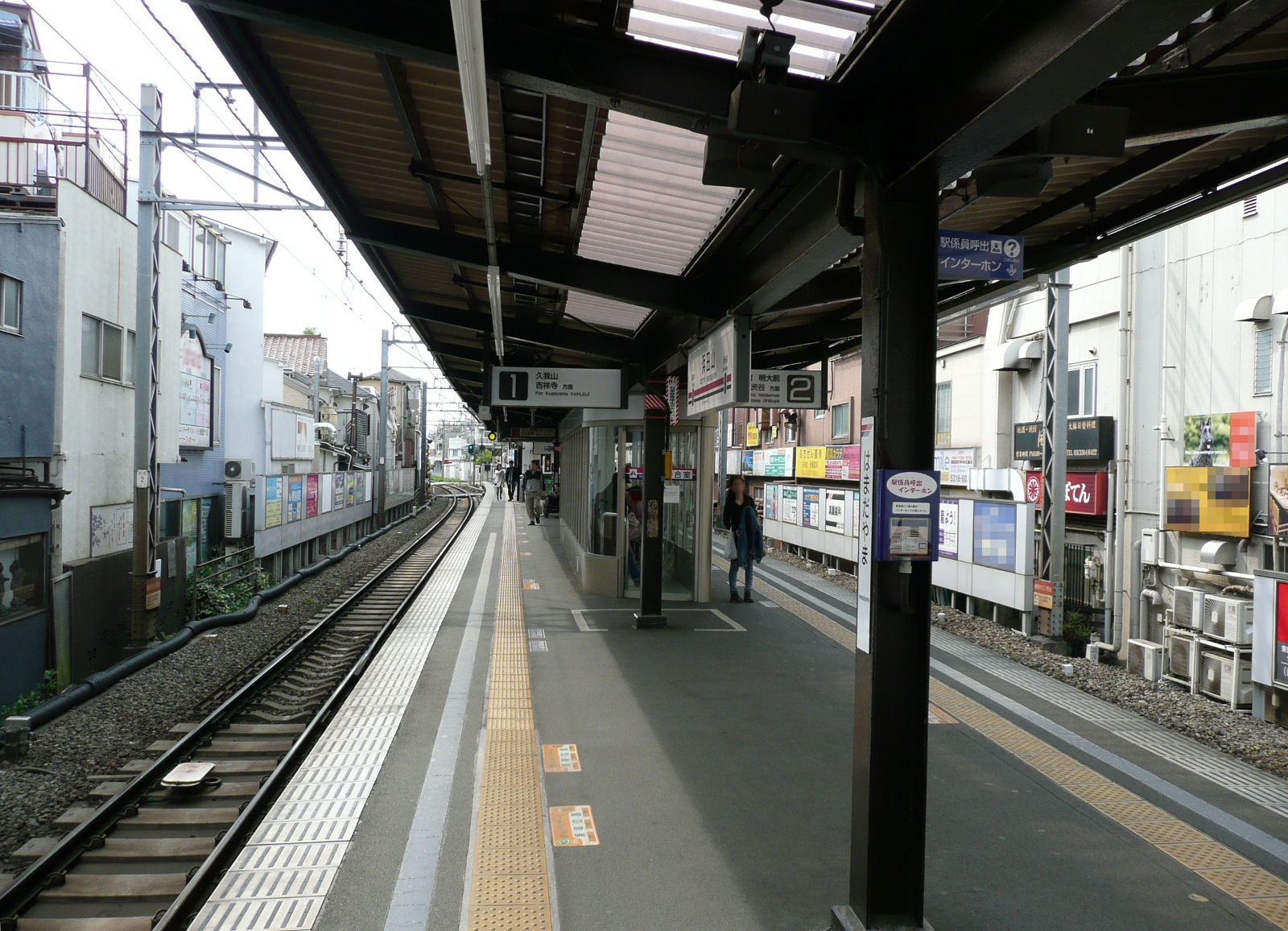
View of the platforms, looking west, April 2011

The station consists of a single ground-level island platform serving two tracks.

Across the tracks at both the Kichijoji and Shibuya ends are pedestrian crossings. The ticket gates are at ground level, but there is only an entrance on the north side of the tracks. In order to enter the station from the south side, one must first use a pedestrian crossing to the north side.

The station was rebuilt in 1995, moving the station building underground, and extending the length of the platform, coinciding with the introduction of the Keio 1000 series, with trains of five 20 m cars. Before the rebuilding, there was a road crossing the tracks within the area that trains stopped in at the station.

=== Platforms ===
1	Keio Inokashira Line	for Kugayama and Kichijōji
2	Keio Inokashira Line	for Shimo-Kitazawa, Meidaimae, and Shibuya

== History ==
The station opened on 1 August 1933.

From 22 February 2013, station numbering was introduced on Keio lines, with Hamadayama Station becoming "IN11".

== Passenger statistics ==
In fiscal 2011, the station was used by an average of 28,169 passengers daily.

The passenger figures for previous years are as shown below.

Fiscal year	Daily average
1999	25,935
2010	28,285
2011	28,169

== Surrounding area ==
- Tokyo Toyotama High School
- Tokyo Suginami General High School

As of February 2016, there was a large number of supermarkets near the station compared to other stations on the Inokashira Line, including Comodi Iida, My Basket, Seiyu, and Seijo Ishii.
