= Nishi-eifuku Station =

Railway station in Suginami, Tokyo, Japan

Nishi-eifuku Station 西永福駅

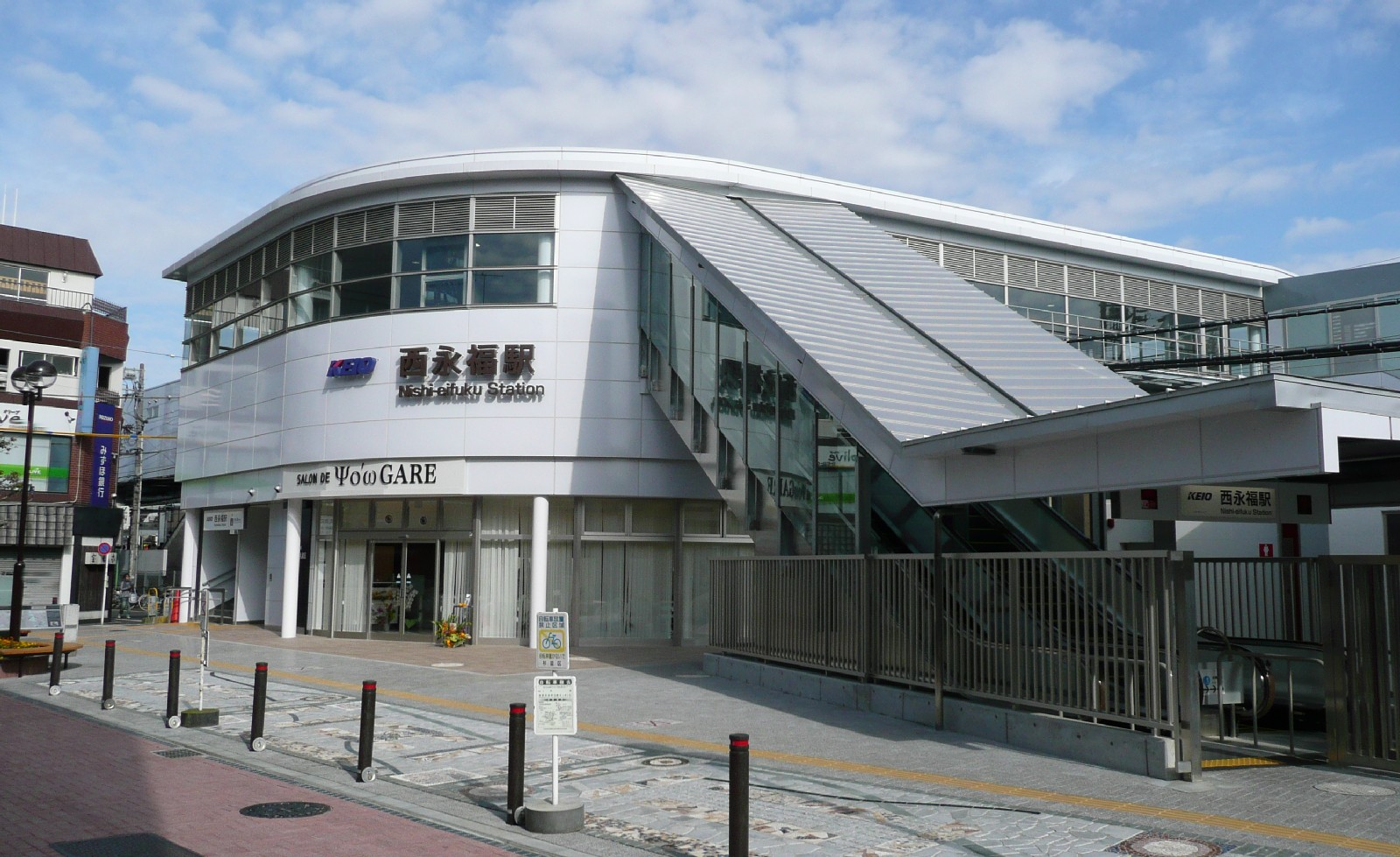
- Station building, October 2008

General information
- Location: Suginami, Tokyo; Japan
- Coordinates: 35°40′44″N 139°38′07″E
- Operator: Keio Corporation
- Line: Keio Inokashira Line
- Connections: Bus stop

Other information
- Station code: IN10

History
- Opened: August 1, 1933; 93 years ago

Passengers
- FY2011: 18,087 daily

Services
Preceding station	Keio Corporation	Following station
Hamadayama towards Kichijōji	Inokashira Line Local	Eifukuchō towards Shibuya
Location

Nishi-eifuku Station (西永福駅, Nishi-eifuku-eki) is a railway station on the Keio Inokashira Line in Suginami, Tokyo, Japan, operated by the private railway operator Keio Corporation.

== Lines ==
Nishi-eifuku Station is served by the 12.7 km Keio Inokashira Line from Shibuya in Tokyo to Kichijōji. Located between Eifukuchō and Hamadayama, it is 6.7 km from the Shibuya terminus.

== Service pattern ==
Only all-stations "Local" services stop at this station. During the daytime, there are eight services per hour in either direction.

== Station layout ==
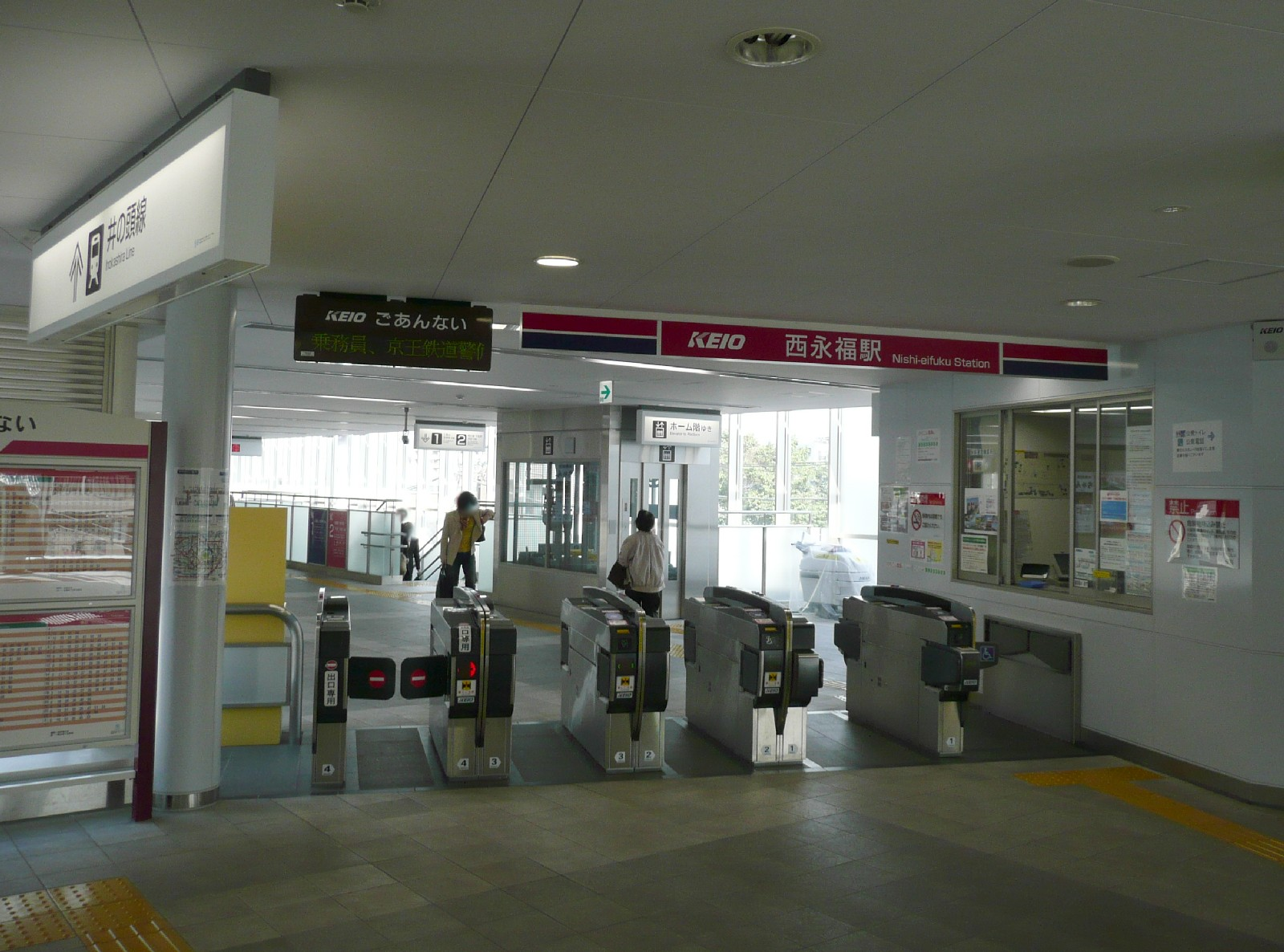
The ticket barriers, October 2008

The station consists of a ground-level island platform serving two tracks.

Previously there was only one ticket gate, at the south exit, and the platform and station building were connected by an underground passageway. In order to make it accessible, and to prevent traffic accidents at the railroad crossing outside the station, it was decided that it would be rebuilt as an over-track station with a north exit, elevators and escalators. It was also decided to add a free passageway over the tracks as well as elevators and an escalator on the north end, and construction began in October 2007, with the new station building opening on 16 December of the same year. On 25 March 2008, the new south exit, with elevators, escalators and stairs opened. Because of space constraints, on the north side there is only an upward escalator.

Before the renovations, there were no toilets within the station, and the Suginami public toilet in the square outside the station was used. With the new over-track station building, however, toilets were built inside the ticket gates, including a multipurpose toilet. After the station's renovations were completed, the public toilet outside the station was rebuilt. The shops outside the south exit were closed before the renovation.

The station is only 700 m from neighboring Eifukucho Station, and both Eifukuchō Station and Hamadayama Station can be seen from the platform.

=== Platforms ===
1	Keio Inokashira Line	for Kugayama and Kichijōji
2	Keio Inokashira Line	for Shimo-Kitazawa, Meidaimae, and Shibuya

== History ==
The station opened on 1 August 1933.

From 22 February 2013, station numbering was introduced on Keio lines, with Nishi-eifuku Station becoming "IN10".

== Passenger statistics ==
In fiscal 2011, the station was used by an average of 18,087 passengers daily.

The passenger figures for previous years are as shown below.

Fiscal year	Daily average
1999	19,706
2010	18,620
2011	18,087

== Surrounding area ==
- Takachiho University
- Omiya Hachimangu Shrine
- Wadabori Park
