= Fujimigaoka Station =

Railway station in Suginami, Tokyo, Japan

Fujimigaoka Station 富士見ヶ丘駅

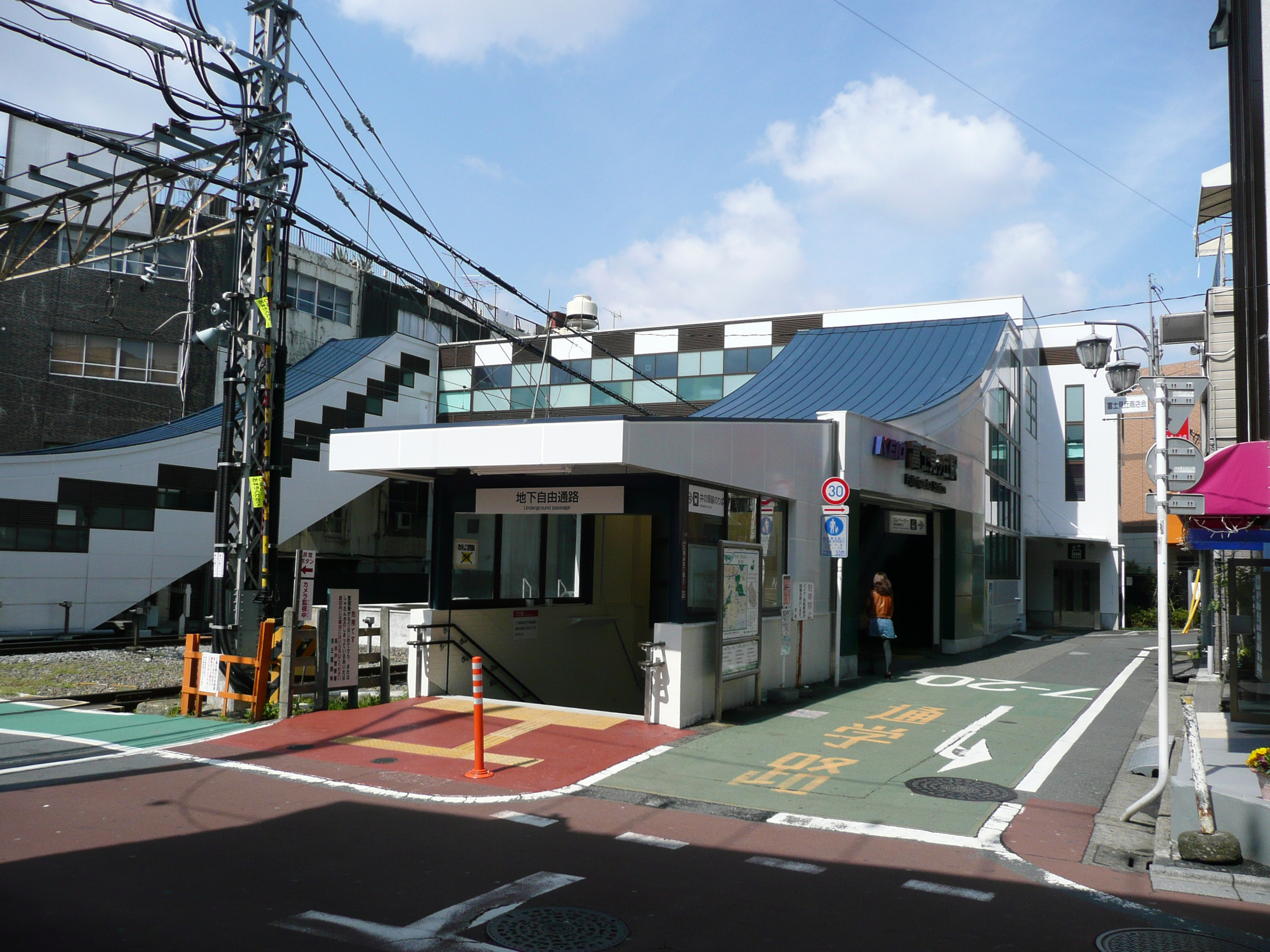
- North entrance, April 2012

General information
- Location: Suginami, Tokyo; Japan
- Coordinates: 35°41′05″N 139°36′26″E
- Operator: Keio Corporation
- Line: Keio Inokashira Line
- Connections: Bus stop

Other information
- Station code: IN13

History
- Opened: August 1, 1933; 93 years ago

Passengers
- FY2011: 13,370 daily

Services
Preceding station	Keio Corporation	Following station
Kugayama towards Kichijōji	Inokashira Line Local	Takaido towards Shibuya
Location

Fujimigaoka Station (富士見ヶ丘駅, Fujimigaoka-eki), i.e. Fuji View Hill Station, is a railway station on the Keio Inokashira Line in Suginami, Tokyo, Japan, operated by the private railway operator Keio Corporation.

== Lines ==
Fujimigaoka Station is served by the 12.7 km Keio Inokashira Line from Shibuya in Tokyo to Kichijōji. Located between Takaido and Kugayama, it is 9.4 km from the Shibuya terminus.

== Service pattern ==
Only all-stations "Local" services stop at this station. During the daytime, there are eight services per hour in either direction.

== Layout ==
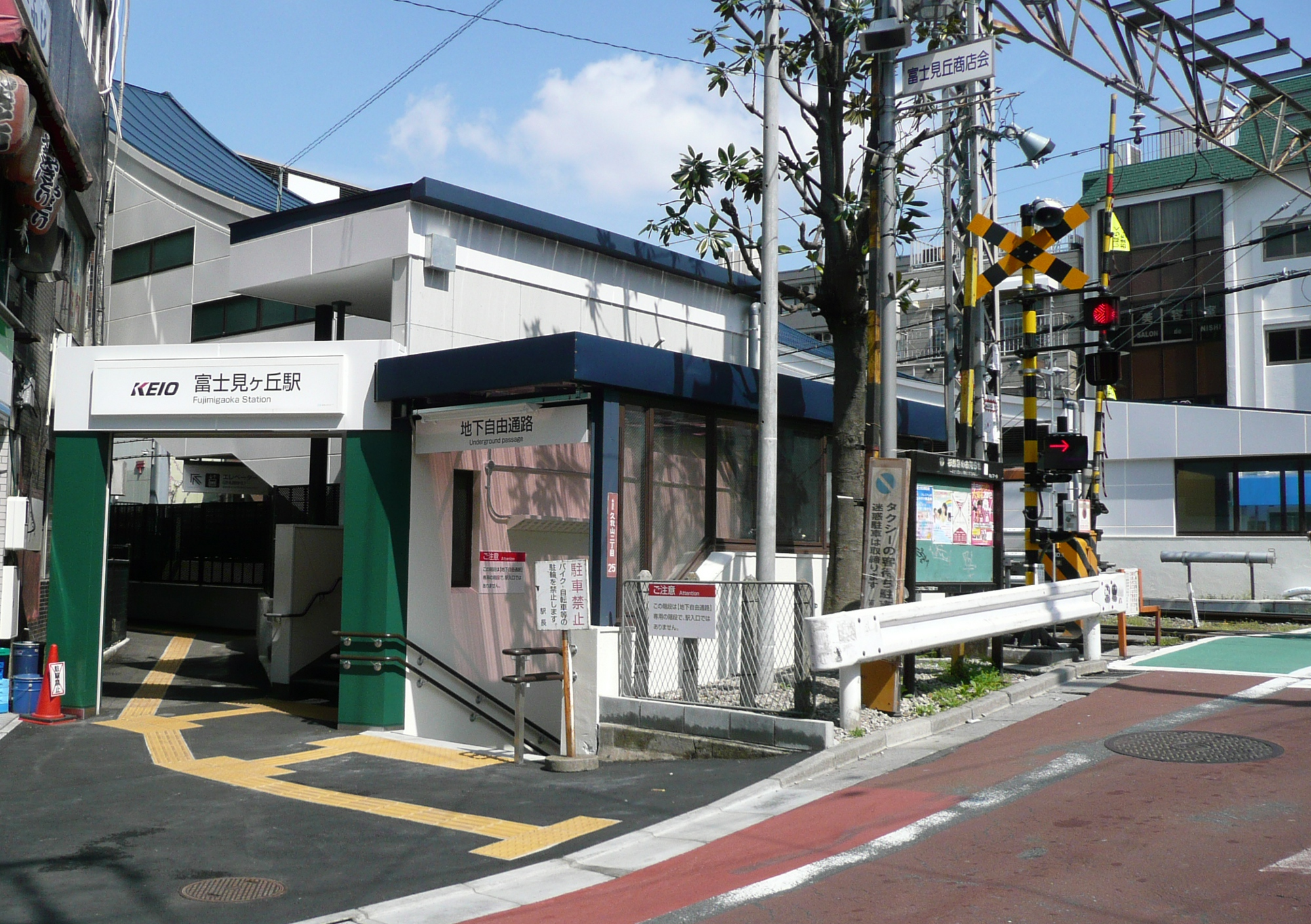
South entrance, April 2012

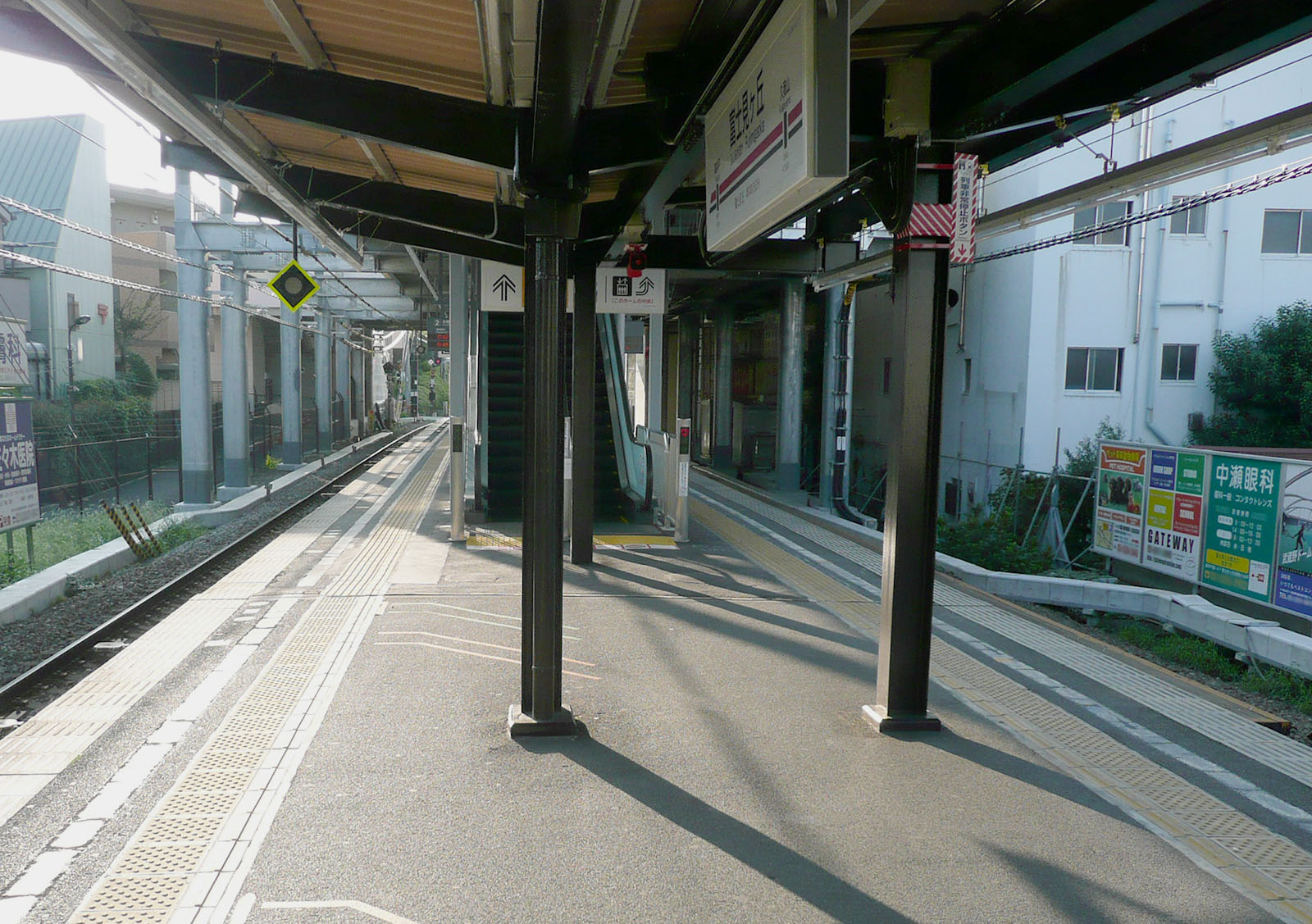
View of the platforms, August 2011

The station consists of a single ground-level island platform serving two tracks. The station has an above-track station building. Construction of the current station building began in March 2010, and was completed in December of the same year. There are elevators and escalators between the station building concourse and platform, and to the ground level at the north and south exits (though there is no escalator between the station building and ground level at the south exit).

The underground passage that was previously used to connect to the old station building until December 2010 has been maintained as a free passageway for pedestrians to cross the tracks on the south side.

To the west of the station lies Fujimigaoka Depot (富士見ヶ丘検車区, Fujimigaoka kensha-ku). Also to the west of the station is an interchange between the two lines of tracks allowing trains to move from the Shibuya-bound tracks to Kichijoji-bound tracks and vice versa. Because trains are stabled at the depot overnight, there are some morning trains which run from this station to Shibuya.

The toilets are on the second floor, inside the ticket gates. These include multi-purpose toilets.

=== Platforms ===
1	Keio Inokashira Line	for Kugayama and Kichijōji
2	Keio Inokashira Line	for Shimo-Kitazawa, Meidaimae, and Shibuya

== History ==
The station opened on 1 August 1933.

From 22 February 2013, station numbering was introduced on Keio lines, with Fujimigaoka Station becoming "IN13".

== Passenger statistics ==
In fiscal 2011, the station was used by an average of 13,370 passengers daily.

The passenger figures for previous years are as shown below.

Fiscal year	Daily average
1999	13,911
2010	13,468
2011	13,370
