= Eifukuchō Station =

Railway station in Tokyo, Japan

Eifukuchō Station 永福町駅

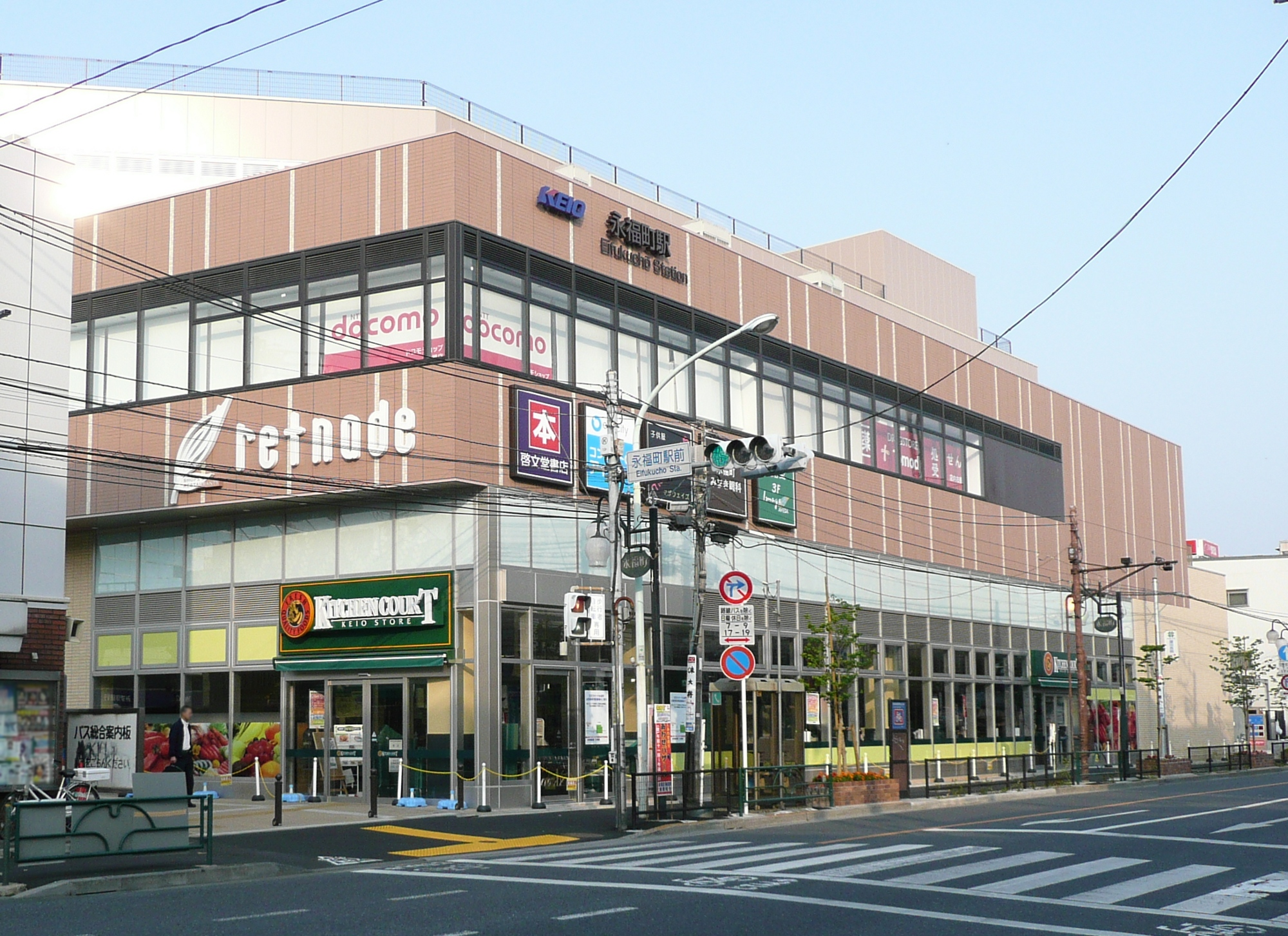
- Station building, May 2011

General information
- Location: Suginami, Tokyo; Japan
- Coordinates: 35°40′33″N 139°38′37″E
- Operator: Keio Corporation
- Line: Keio Inokashira Line
- Connections: Bus stop

Other information
- Station code: IN09

History
- Opened: August 1, 1933; 93 years ago

Passengers
- FY2011: 29,875 daily

Services
| Preceding station | Keio Corporation | Following station |
|---|---|---|
| Kugayama towards Kichijōji | Inokashira Line Express | Meidaimae towards Shibuya |
| Nishi-eifuku towards Kichijōji | Inokashira Line Local | Meidaimae towards Shibuya |
Location

Eifukuchō Station (永福町駅, Eifukuchō-eki) is a railway station on the Keio Inokashira Line in Suginami, Tokyo, Japan, operated by the private railway operator Keio Corporation.

== Lines ==
Eifukuchō Station is served by the 12.7 km Keio Inokashira Line from Shibuya in Tokyo to Kichijōji. Located between Meidaimae and Nishi-Eifuku, it is 6.0 km from the Shibuya terminus.

== Service pattern ==
Both all-stations "Local" services and limited-stop "Express" services stop at this station. During the daytime, there are eight "Local" and "eight "Express" services per hour in either direction.

== Station layout ==
The station consists of two ground-level island platforms serving four tracks, and an above-track station building. It is the only station on the Inokashira Line which has passing loops, to allow transfers between express and local trains in both directions.

As of March 21, 2010, the old, underground station building was replaced by an above-station building, and a south exit was opened, in addition to the existing north exit. On March 23, 2011, the shopping center Keio Retnade (京王リトナード, Keiō ritonaado) was opened.

Before the station was rebuilt as an over-track station, there was a walkway at the end of the platforms toward Shibuya between the platforms and the station building, but it was connected by stairs only, with no barrier free facilities. However, the current station includes elevators and escalators between the concourse and platforms on the Kichijoji end of the platforms, and stairs on the Shibuya end, making it fully accessible.

In the concourse there is a bronze statue of a famous person from the area around the station and panel of photos from the time of the station's opening.

=== Platforms ===
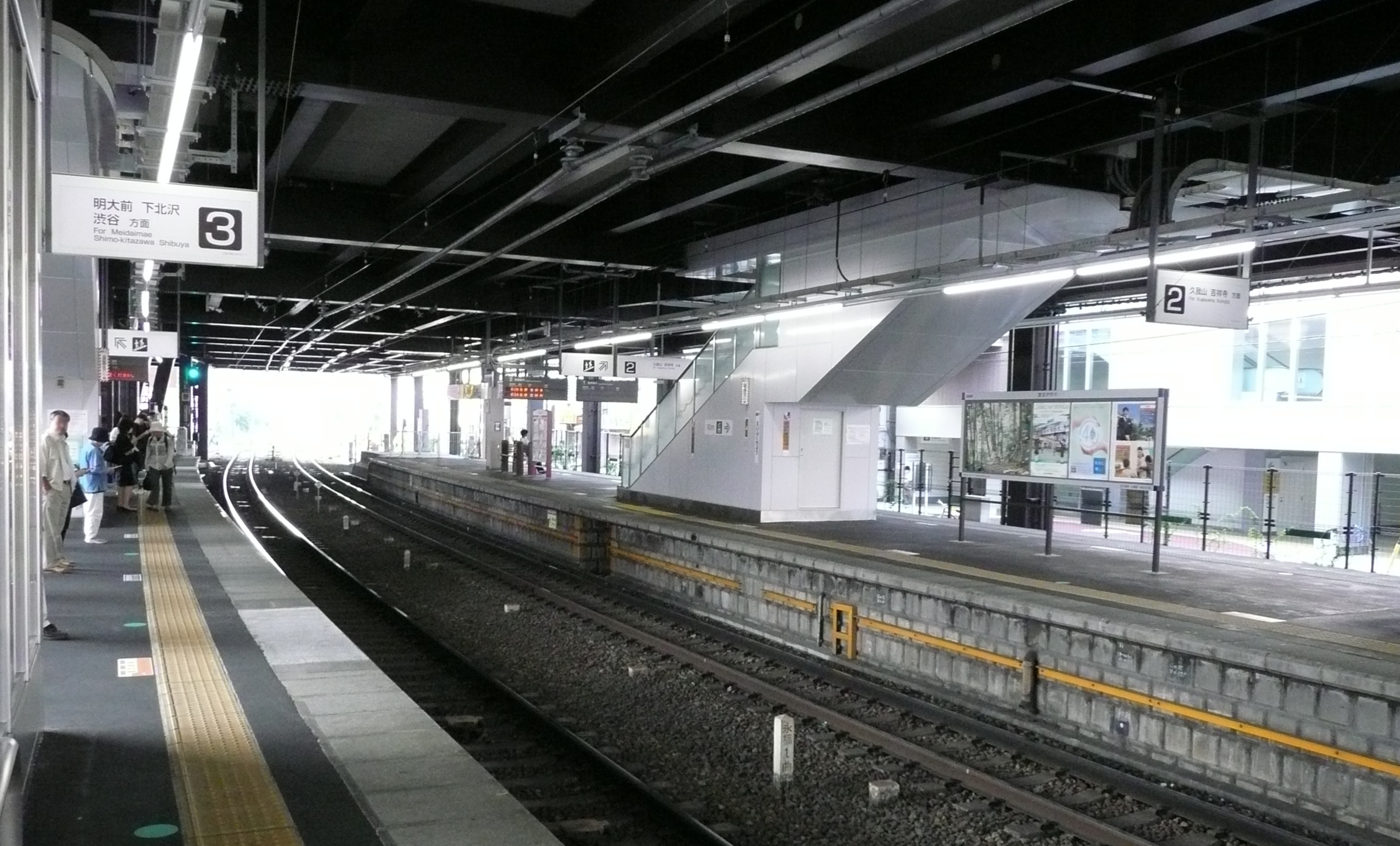
The platforms, May 2011

| 1, 2 | Keio Inokashira Line | for Kugayama and Kichijōji |
| 3, 4 | Keio Inokashira Line | for Shimo-Kitazawa, Meidaimae, and Shibuya |

The outer platforms, 1 and 4, are normally used by all-stations "Local" services.

== History ==
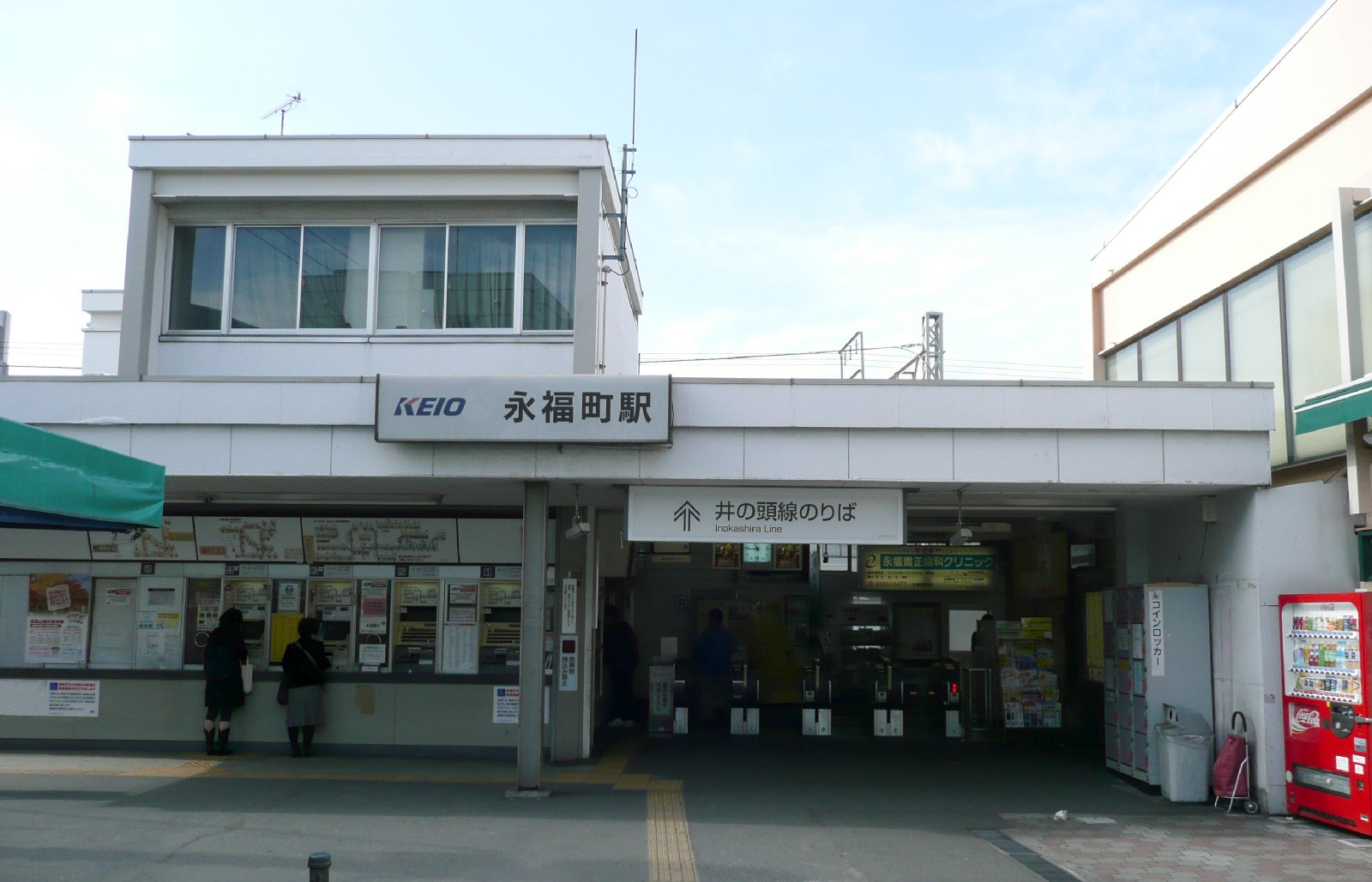
Station entrance before rebuilding, October 2008

The station opened on August 1, 1933.

From 22 February 2013, station numbering was introduced on Keio lines, with Eifukuchō Station becoming "IN09".

== Passenger statistics ==
In fiscal 2011, the station was used by an average of 29,875 passengers daily.

The passenger figures for previous years are as shown below.

| Fiscal year | Daily average |
|---|---|
| 1999 | 28,397 |
| 2010 | 29,340 |
| 2011 | 29,875 |

== Surrounding area ==
- Eifukuji Temple (永福寺), after which the station was named
