= Kugayama Station =

Railway station in Suginami, Tokyo, Japan

Kugayama Station 久我山駅

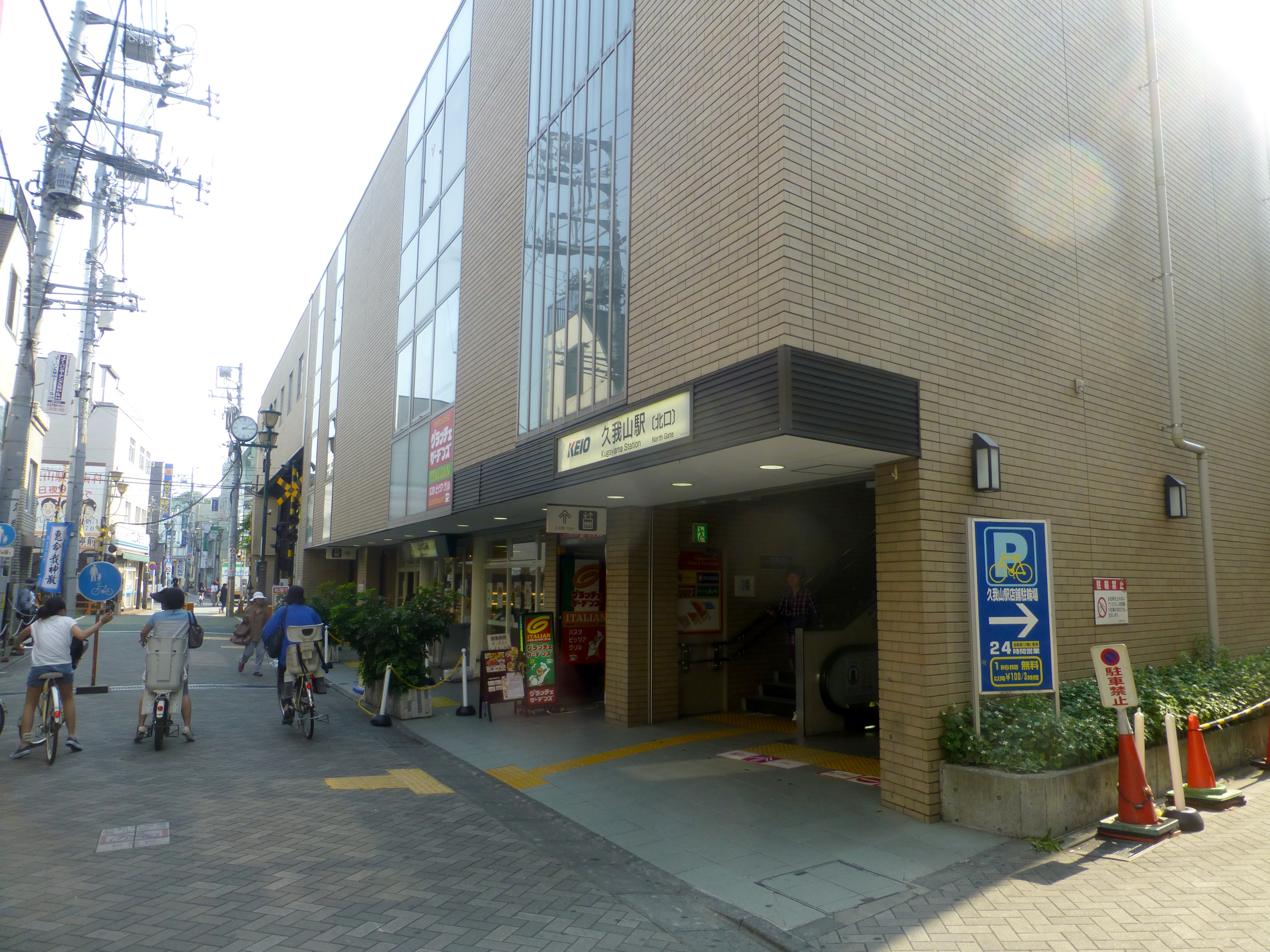
- North entrance, May 2016

General information
- Location: Suginami, Tokyo; Japan
- Coordinates: 35°41′16″N 139°35′59″E
- Operator: Keio Corporation
- Line: Keio Inokashira Line
- Connections: Bus stop

Other information
- Station code: IN14

History
- Opened: August 1, 1933; 93 years ago

Passengers
- FY2011: 36,633 daily

Services
Preceding station	Keio Corporation	Following station
Kichijōji Terminus	Inokashira Line Express	Eifukuchō towards Shibuya
Mitakadai towards Kichijōji	Inokashira Line Local	Fujimigaoka towards Shibuya
Location

Kugayama Station (久我山駅, Kugayama-eki) is a railway station on the Keio Inokashira Line in Suginami, Tokyo, Japan, operated by the private railway operator Keio Corporation.

== Lines ==
Kugayama Station is served by the 12.7 km Keio Inokashira Line from Shibuya in Tokyo to Kichijōji. Located between Fujimigaoka and Mitakadai, it is 10.2 km from the Shibuya terminus.

== Service pattern ==
Limited-stop "Express" and all-stations "Local" services stop at this station. During the daytime, there are eight "Express" and eight "Local" services per hour in either direction.

== Station layout ==
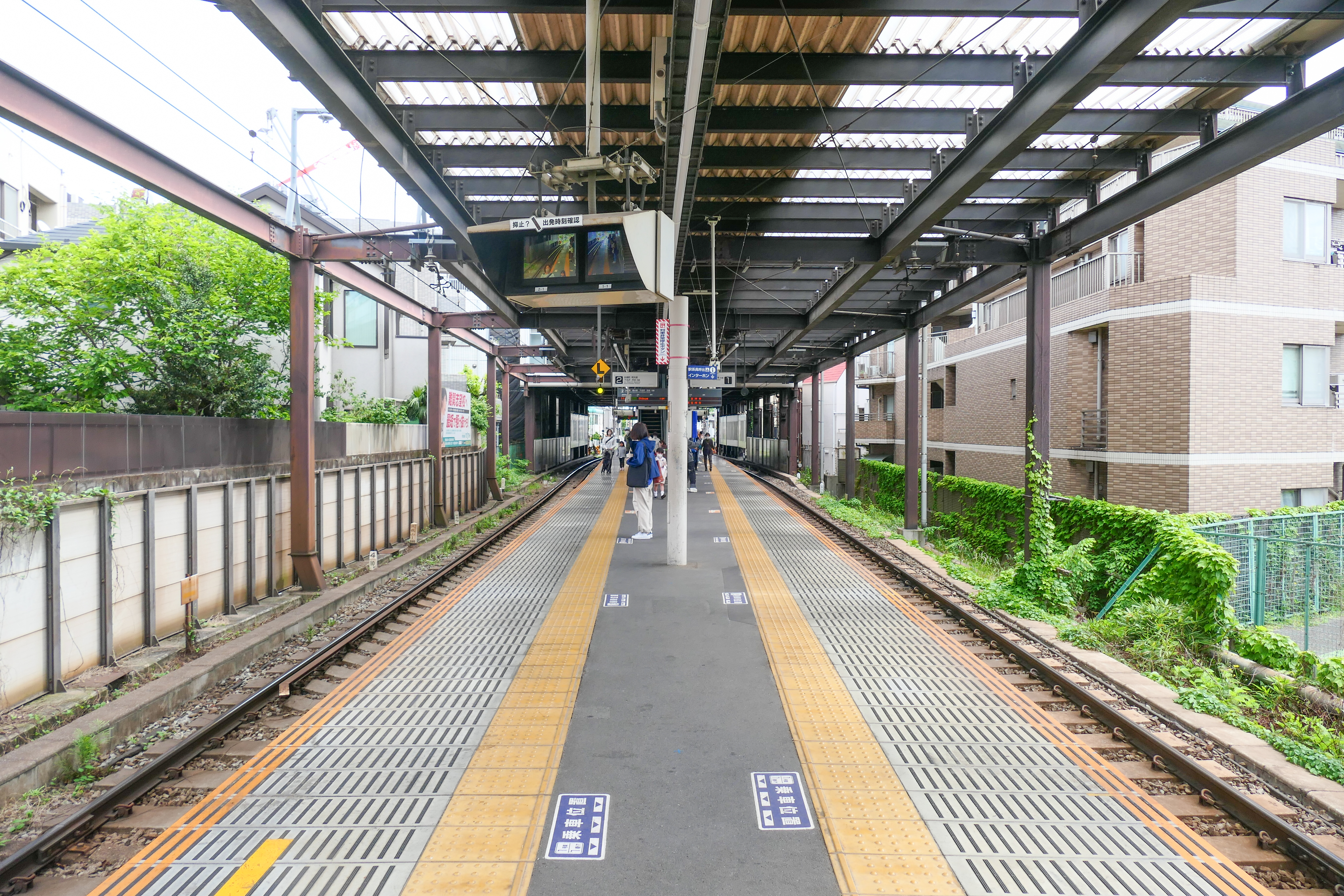
Station platform, April 2023

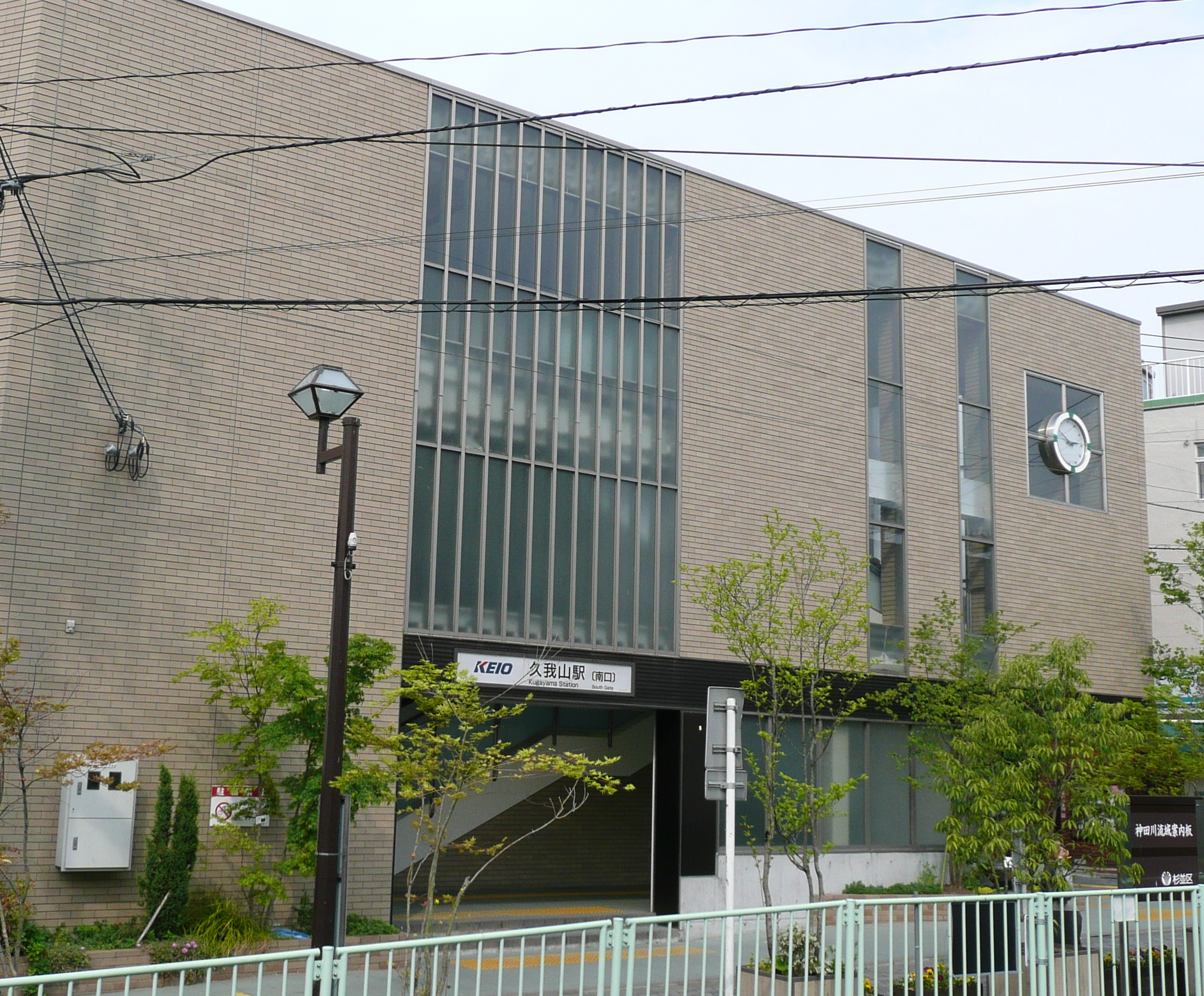
South entrance, April 2011

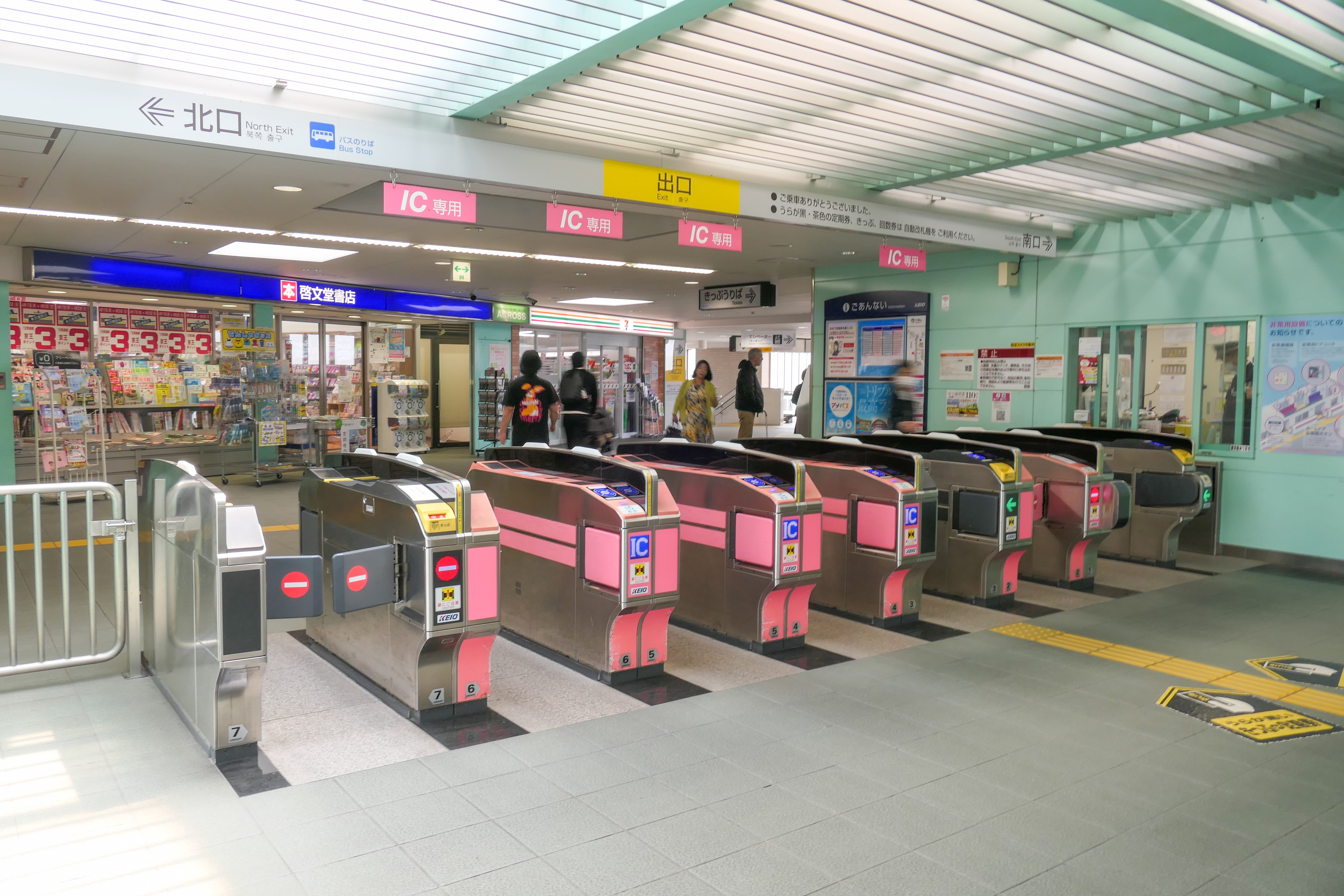
The ticket barriers, April 2023

The station consists of a ground-level island platform serving two tracks. The station has an above-track station building, completed in 2005. The station previously had a ground-level station building at the north exit, connected by an underground passageway.

=== Platforms ===
1	Keio Inokashira Line	for Kichijōji
2	Keio Inokashira Line	for Shimo-Kitazawa, Meidaimae, and Shibuya

== History ==
The station opened on 1 August 1933.

From 22 February 2013, station numbering was introduced on Keio lines, with Kugayama Station becoming "IN14". On 13 August 2018, torrential rain flooded the escalators at Kugayama Station, rendering them unusable.

== Passenger statistics ==
In fiscal 2011, the station was used by an average of 36,633 passengers daily.

The passenger figures for previous years are as shown below.

Fiscal year	Daily average
1999	35,779
2010	36,850
2011	36,633
