= Shibuya Station =

Major railway and metro station in Tokyo, Japan

Shibuya Station 渋谷駅
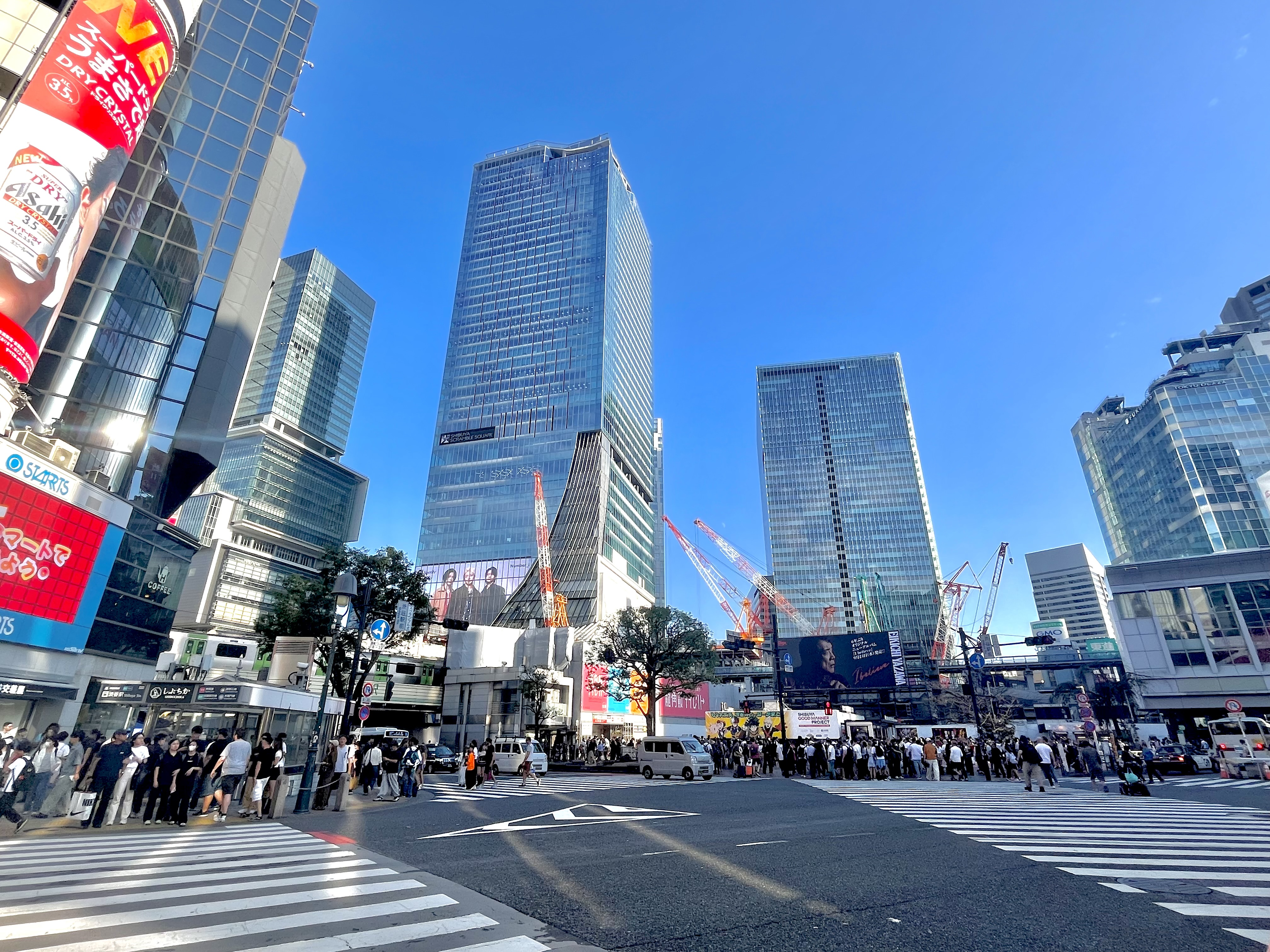
- Shibuya Station in 2025. Facing south with Shibuya Crossing in the foreground.

Japanese name
- Shinjitai: 渋谷駅
- Kyūjitai: 澁谷驛
- Hiragana: しぶやえき

General information
- Location: Shibuya, Tokyo; Japan
- Coordinates: 35°39′31″N 139°42′05″E
- Operator: JR East; Keio; Tōkyū Railways; Tokyo Metro
- Connections: Bus terminal

History
- Opened: 1 March 1885; 141 years ago

Passengers
- FY2024: 648,828 daily; 1,770,430 daily; 191,505 daily; 286,940 daily
Location
- Location within Tokyo Yamanote Loop Location within Tokyo wards area Location within Japan

Shibuya Station (渋谷駅, Shibuya-eki) is a major railway station in Shibuya, Tokyo, Japan, operated by East Japan Railway Company (JR East), Keio Corporation, Tokyu Corporation, and Tokyo Metro. It serves as a terminal for six railway lines, five of which are operated by Tokyo Metro and Tokyu Corporation.

As of 2025, the station is visited by approximately 3 million people per day, making it the second-busiest railway station in the world. The station handles a large population of commuter traffic between the city center and suburbs to the south and west.

== Lines ==
=== JR East ===
- Saikyō Line / Shōnan–Shinjuku Line (Yamanote Freight Line) - also used by Narita Express trains
- Yamanote Line

=== Private railways ===
- Keio Inokashira Line - terminus
- Den-en-toshi Line - through service with Tokyo Metro Hanzomon Line
- Tōyoko Line - through service with Tokyo Metro Fukutoshin Line

=== Subways ===
- Ginza Line - terminus
- Hanzōmon Line - through service with Tokyu Den-en-toshi Line
- Fukutoshin Line - through service with Tokyu Tōyoko Line

Note that while the Tokyo Metro Hanzōmon Line and Fukutoshin Line are directly connected to each other (and passengers can switch from one to another without passing through ticket gates), the Ginza Line station is a standalone terminal. Transfers to the Fukutoshin/Tōyoko Line are given 60 min to do so outside the fare control area, but those needing to transfer to Hanzōmon/Den-en-toshi Line should transfer at the Omotesando station instead.

== History ==
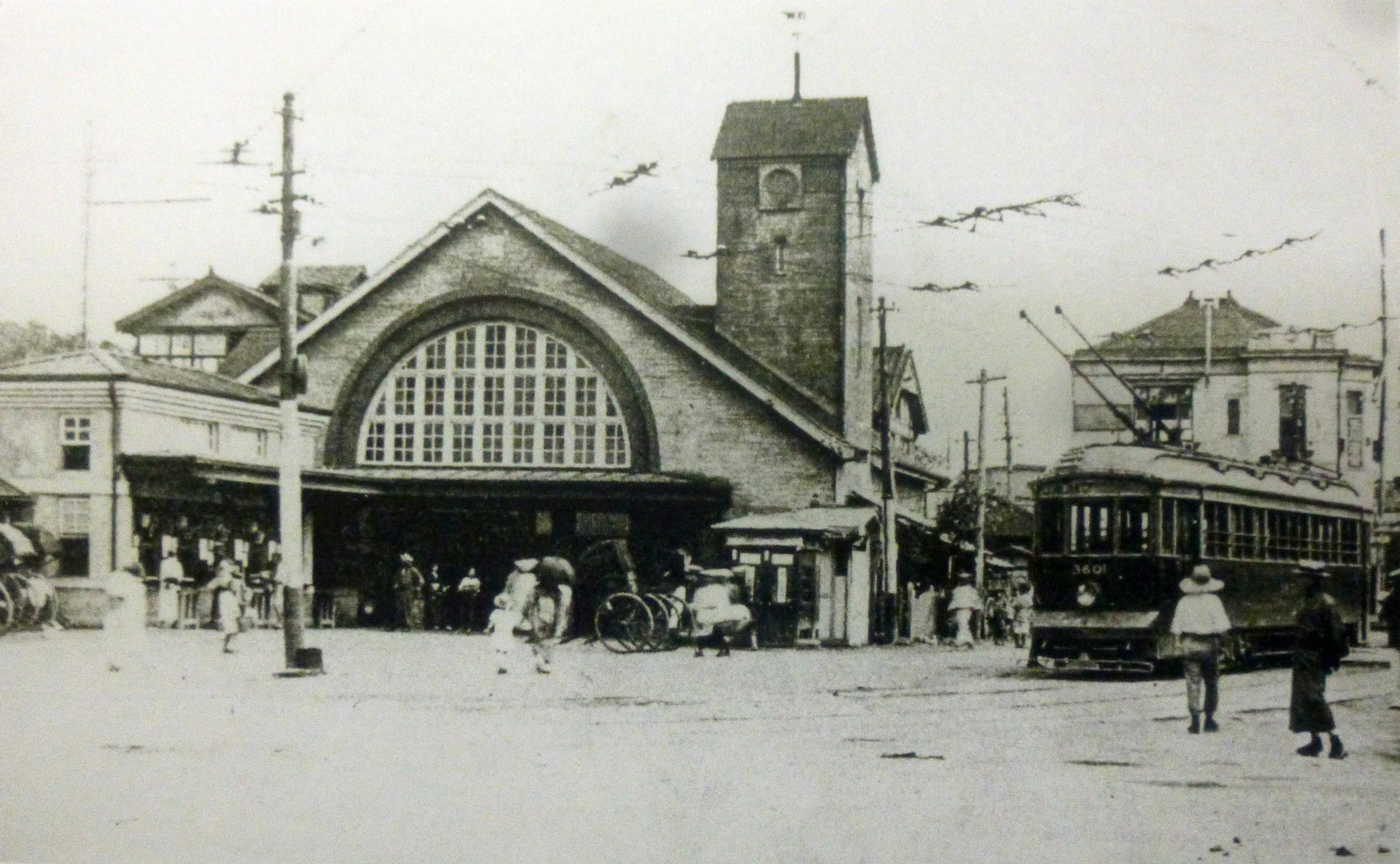
The station in the 1920s

On 1 March 1885, Shibuya Station was opened by the Nippon Railway as a stop on the Shinagawa Line, a predecessor of the present-day Yamanote Line. The station in its first years saw little usage by passengers, with an average of 16 to 17 people per day. The Shinagawa Line itself was initially single-tracked, and the station was serviced by two-car formations making three return trips. Usage increased from 1887, when local residents began to recognize the convenience of rail travel. The Nippon Railway was later nationalized in 1906 under the Railway Nationalization Act. The station was later expanded to accommodate the Tamagawa Line, now a section of the Setagaya Line, in August 1907. The Tokyo Toden extended to the station in August 1911. The station building was rebuilt with a new structure featuring a clock tower.

In 1922, Tamagawa Electric Railway opened the Tenngennji Line which terminates at the station.

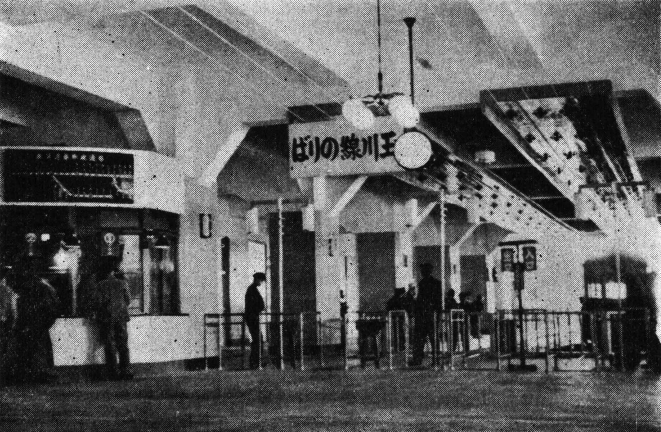
Tamagawa Line Shibuya Station in the 1940s

The station continued to service additional lines, beginning with the Toyoko Line operated by the predecessor of Tokyu Corporation from 1927, and the current Inokashira Line in 1933. The Tokyo Rapid Railway (later the Tokyo Metro Ginza Line) opened and began serving the station in 1938. Developments in the area around Shibuya Station paused during World War II.

Following the end of the war, the Den-en-toshi Line (1977), the Hanzōmon Line (1978), and the Fukutoshin Line (2008) began serving the station. Between December 2008 and March 2009, piezoelectric-generating mats were installed at Shibuya Station as a small-scale test.

From 22 February 2013, station numbering was introduced on Keio lines, with Shibuya Station denoted "IN01". Station numbering was later introduced to the JR East platforms in 2016 with Shibuya assigned station numbers JS19 for the Shonan-Shinjuku line, JA10 for the Saikyo line, and JY20 for the Yamanote Line. At the same time, JR East assigned three-letter codes to its major transfer stations; Shibuya was assigned the code "SBY".

=== Redevelopments ===
In 2013 and 2014, Shibuya station underwent major renovations as part of a long-term site redevelopment plan. Older buildings, such as the former main station building that previously housed the Tokyu department store, were closed and demolished. The Shibuya Hikarie building, also owned by the Tokyu Group, opened in 2012 and contains department stores, restaurants, and offices.

JR East rebuilt the station, with reconstruction work beginning in earnest in fiscal year 2015. On 3 January 2020, the Ginza Line platforms were shifted approximately 50 meters (164 ft 1 in) east of the previous location. On 1 June 2020, the Saikyo Line platforms were shifted about 350 meters (1,148 ft 4 in) north of the old platforms, and now sit right next to the Yamanote Line platforms. Major widening work took place on the Yamanote Line inner-loop platform (Platform 2) on 23–24 October 2021. As a result, Yamanote Line service was suspended between Ikebukuro and Osaki. With the opening of the Sotetsu Link Line on 30 November 2019, the Saikyo Line commenced through services onto the Sagami Railway.

On the platform of the Toyoko Line, which was moved to the east side of the station, Tokyu Corporation constructed a 230-meter (754 ft 7 in) high, 47-story commercial building "Shibuya Scramble Square", which became the tallest building in Shibuya upon its opening in November 2019. Other sections of the complex remain under construction and will be completed by 2031. Several commercial buildings connected to the station are scheduled for completion by 2027.

== Station layout ==
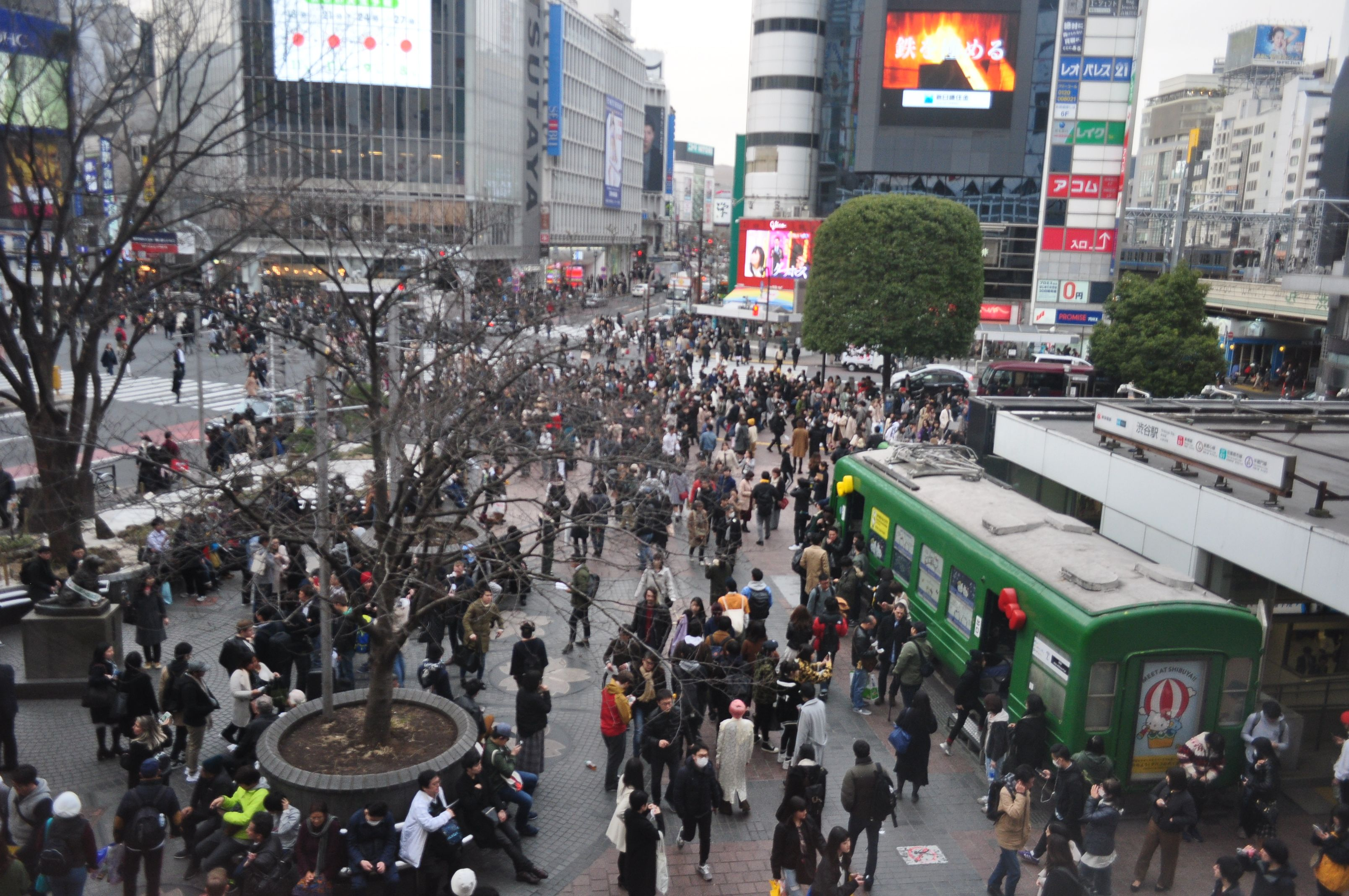
(Hachikō Front Square)

The Tokyo Metro Ginza Line, originally built and operated by a Tokyu keiretsu company, uses platforms on the third floor of the station building. The JR lines are on the second floor in a north-south orientation. The Tokyu Toyoko Line originally used parallel platforms on the second floor of the same building, but from 16 March 2013, the Toyoko Line moved underground to provide rail service with the Tokyo Metro Fukutoshin Line. The Tokyo Metro Hanzomon Line and Tokyu Den-en-Toshi Line share platforms underground in another part of the station. The Keio Inokashira Line uses platforms on the second floor of the Shibuya Mark City building to the west of the main station complex.

The main JR/Tokyu/Tokyo Metro complex has six exits. The northwest Hachikō Exit (ハチ公口, Hachikō-guchi), named for the nearby statue of the dog Hachikō and located next to Shibuya's famous scramble crossing, is a particularly popular meeting spot. The Tamagawa Exit (玉川口, Tamagawa-guchi) on the west side leads to the Keiō Inokashira Line Shibuya Station platforms.

On 17 November 2008 (18 years ago), a mural by Tarō Okamoto, "The Myth of Tomorrow", depicting a human figure being hit by an atomic bomb, was unveiled in its new permanent location at the station, in the connecting passage to the Keio Inokashira Line entrance.

=== JR East ===
SBYJY20 JA10 JS19 Shibuya Station 渋谷駅
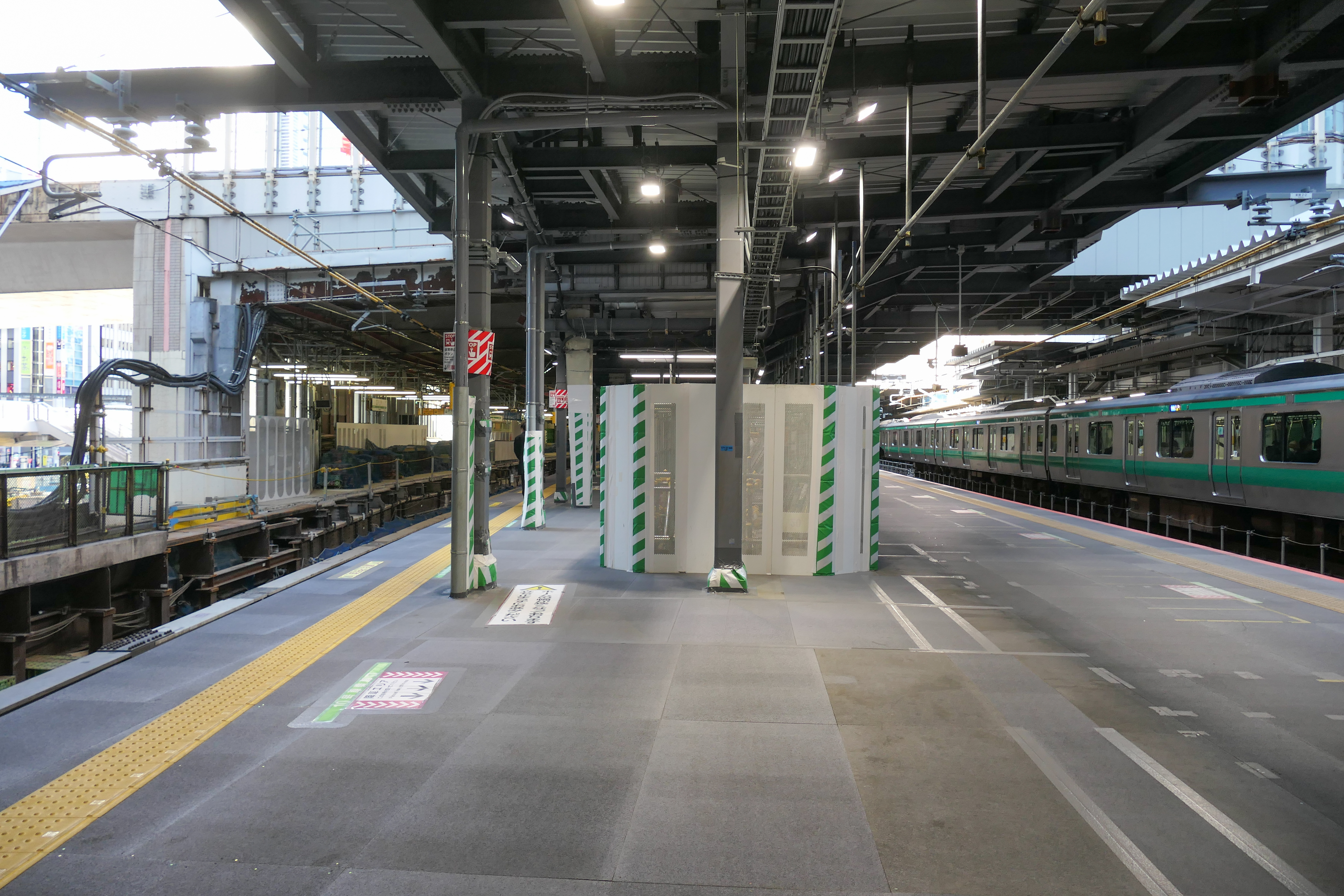
- Yamanote Line platform

General information
- Location: 1-1 Dogenzaka Itchōme, Shibuya, Tokyo; Japan
- Operator: JR East
- Lines: Yamanote Line; Saikyo Line; Shonan-Shinjuku Line
- Platforms: 2 Island platforms
- Tracks: 4

Construction
- Structure type: Ground level
- Accessible: Yes

History
- Opened: 1885; 141 years ago

Passengers
- FY2013: 378,539 daily
Services
Preceding station	JR East	Following station
Ebisu Next counter-clockwise	Yamanote Line	Harajuku JY19 Next clockwise
Shinjuku Terminus	Narita Express	Shinagawa (limited service) towards Narita Airport Terminal 1
Musashi-Kosugi towards Itō	Saphir Odoriko	Shinjuku Terminus
Osaki towards Odawara	Shōnan	Shinjuku Terminus
Ōsaki towards Odawara	Shōnan–Shinjuku Line Special Rapid	Shinjuku towards Takasaki, Maebashi or Utsunomiya
Ebisu towards Odawara or Zushi	Shōnan–Shinjuku Line Rapid Local	Shinjuku towards Takasaki, Maebashi or Utsunomiya
Ebisu towards Ōsaki	Saikyō Line Commuter Rapid Rapid Local	Shinjuku towards Ōmiya
Ebisu towards Ebina	Sōtetsu–JR Link Line	Shinjuku Terminus
Location

==== Platforms ====
There are two island platforms with a total of four tracks. One of the platforms serves the Yamanote Line and the other serves the Saikyō Line and Shōnan–Shinjuku Line.

The station opened in 1885 with one island platform serving what is now the Yamanote Line. To alleviate congestion, a second side platform was opened to the west in July 1940 and the original platform was converted to a side platform. In March 1996, the first Saikyō Line platform was opened. It was located to the south of the Yamanote Line platforms, approximately 350 m (1,148 ft 4 in) away. This platform was relocated to its current location during 30–31 May 2020. The original Yamanote Line platform was then widened during 23–24 October 2021. Further widened during 7–8 January 2023, when the west side platform was removed from service and both directions of the Yamanote Line were recombined into a single island platform.

1	Yamanote Line	for Shinjuku, and Ikebukuro
2	Yamanote Line	for Shinagawa and Tokyo
3	Saikyō Line	for Shinjuku, Ōmiya, and Kawagoe
3	Shōnan-Shinjuku Line	for Shinjuku and Ōmiya (via the Takasaki Line) for Kumagaya, Takasaki, Maebashi (via the Utsunomiya Line) for Oyama, Utsunomiya
4	Saikyō Line	for Ōsaki; Rinkai Line for Shin-Kiba; Sotetsu Line for Hazawa yokohama-kokudai and Ebina
4	Shōnan-Shinjuku Line	for Yokohama and Ōfuna (via the Tōkaidō Line) for Odawara (via the Yokosuka Line) for Zushi
4	■ Ltd. Express Narita Express	for Tokyo and Narita Airport

=== Tokyo Metro/Tokyu ===
Station layout
3F; Ginza Line platforms	Platform 2	Ginza Line towards Asakusa (Omotesandō) →
3F; Ginza Line platforms	Island platform, doors will open on the right
3F; Ginza Line platforms	Platform 1	Ginza Line towards Asakusa (Omotesandō) →
3F; Ginza Line platforms	Ginza Line concourse	Ginza Line ticket barriers, ticket office Passageways to JR platforms
2F	Upper mezzanine	Ginza Line ticket barriers, ticket machines, station agent Passageways to JR and Keio Inokashira Line platforms
1F	Street Level	Exit/Entrance; Transfer between Ginza Line and Hanzomon Line/Fukutoshin Line/Tokyu stations
B1F	Transfer mezzanine	Staircases and elevators to lower mezzanine
B2F	Lower mezzanine	Hanzomon Line/Fukutoshin Line/Tokyu ticket barriers, ticket machines, station agent
B3F; Hanzōmon Line; Den-en-toshi Line platform	Platform 2	Hanzōmon Line towards Oshiage (Omotesandō) →
B3F; Hanzōmon Line; Den-en-toshi Line platform	Island platform, doors will open on the right
B3F; Hanzōmon Line; Den-en-toshi Line platform	Platform 1	← Tōkyū Den-en-toshi Line towards Chūō-rinkan (Ikejiri-ōhashi) ← Hanzōmon Line termination track
B4F	Transfer mezzanine	Transfer between Hanzōmon Line/Den-en-toshi Line and Fukutoshin Line/Tōyoko Line platforms
B5F; Fukutoshin Line; Tōyoko Line platforms	Platform 6	Fukutoshin Line towards Wakōshi (Meiji-Jingūmae) →
B5F; Fukutoshin Line; Tōyoko Line platforms	Island platform, doors will open on the left/right
B5F; Fukutoshin Line; Tōyoko Line platforms	Platform 5	Fukutoshin Line towards Wakōshi (Meiji-Jingūmae) →
B5F; Fukutoshin Line; Tōyoko Line platforms	Platform 4	← Tokyu Toyoko Line towards Yokohama (Daikan-yama)
B5F; Fukutoshin Line; Tōyoko Line platforms	Island platform, doors will open on the left/right
B5F; Fukutoshin Line; Tōyoko Line platforms	Platform 3	← Tōkyū Tōyoko Line towards Yokohama (Daikan-yama)

==== Tokyu Den-en-toshi Line and Tokyo Metro Hanzomon Line ====
Shibuya Station 渋谷駅

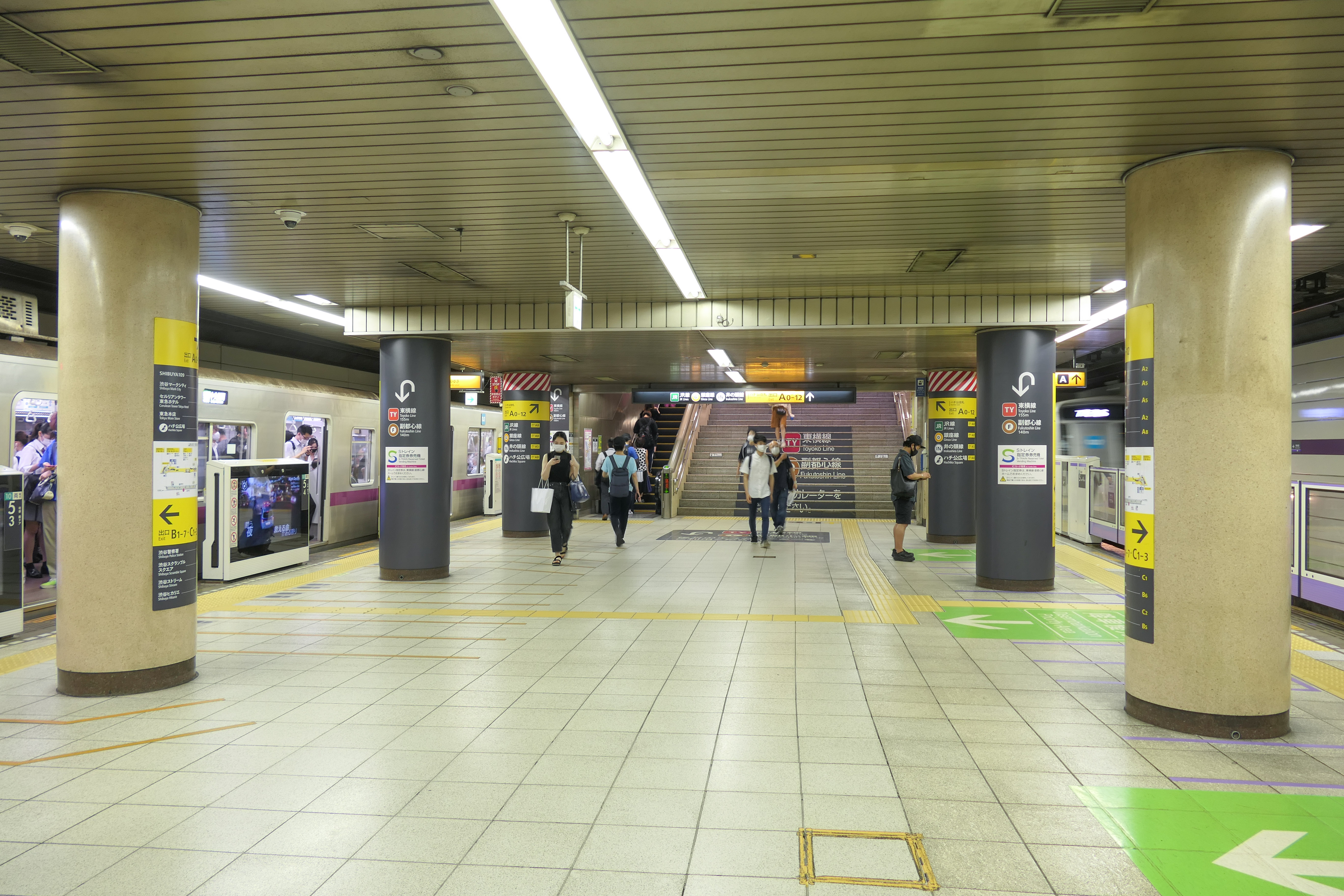
- Platforms for the Den-en-Toshi Line and Hanzomon Line

General information
- Location: 2-1-1 Dogenzaka Nichōme, Shibuya, Tokyo; Japan
- System: /Tokyo Metro station
- Operator: Tōkyū Railways (manager); Tokyo Metro
- Lines: Den-en-toshi Line; Hanzōmon Line
- Platforms: 1 island platform
- Tracks: 2

Construction
- Structure type: Underground

Other information
- Station code: DT01, Z-01

History
- Opened: April 7, 1977; 49 years ago ( Den-en-toshi Line); August 1, 1978; 48 years ago ( Hanzōmon Line)
Services
Preceding station	Tōkyū Railways	Following station
Sangenjaya towards Chūō-rinkan	Den-en-toshi Line Express	through to Hanzomon Line
Ikejiri-ōhashi towards Chūō-rinkan	Den-en-toshi Line Semi Express Local	through to Hanzomon Line
Preceding station	Tokyo Metro	Following station
through to Den-en-toshi Line	Hanzōmon Line	Omote-sando towards Oshiage
Location

===== Platforms =====
On the third basement (B3F) level, a single underground island platform serves two tracks.

1	Den-en-toshi Line	for Futako-tamagawa, Nagatsuta, and Chūō-rinkan
2	Hanzōmon Line	for Otemachi and Oshiage; Tobu Skytree Line for Tōbu-Dōbutsu-Kōen; Tobu Isesaki Line for Kuki; Tobu Nikko Line for Minami-kurihashi

==== Tokyu Toyoko Line and Tokyo Metro Fukutoshin Line ====
Shibuya Station 渋谷駅

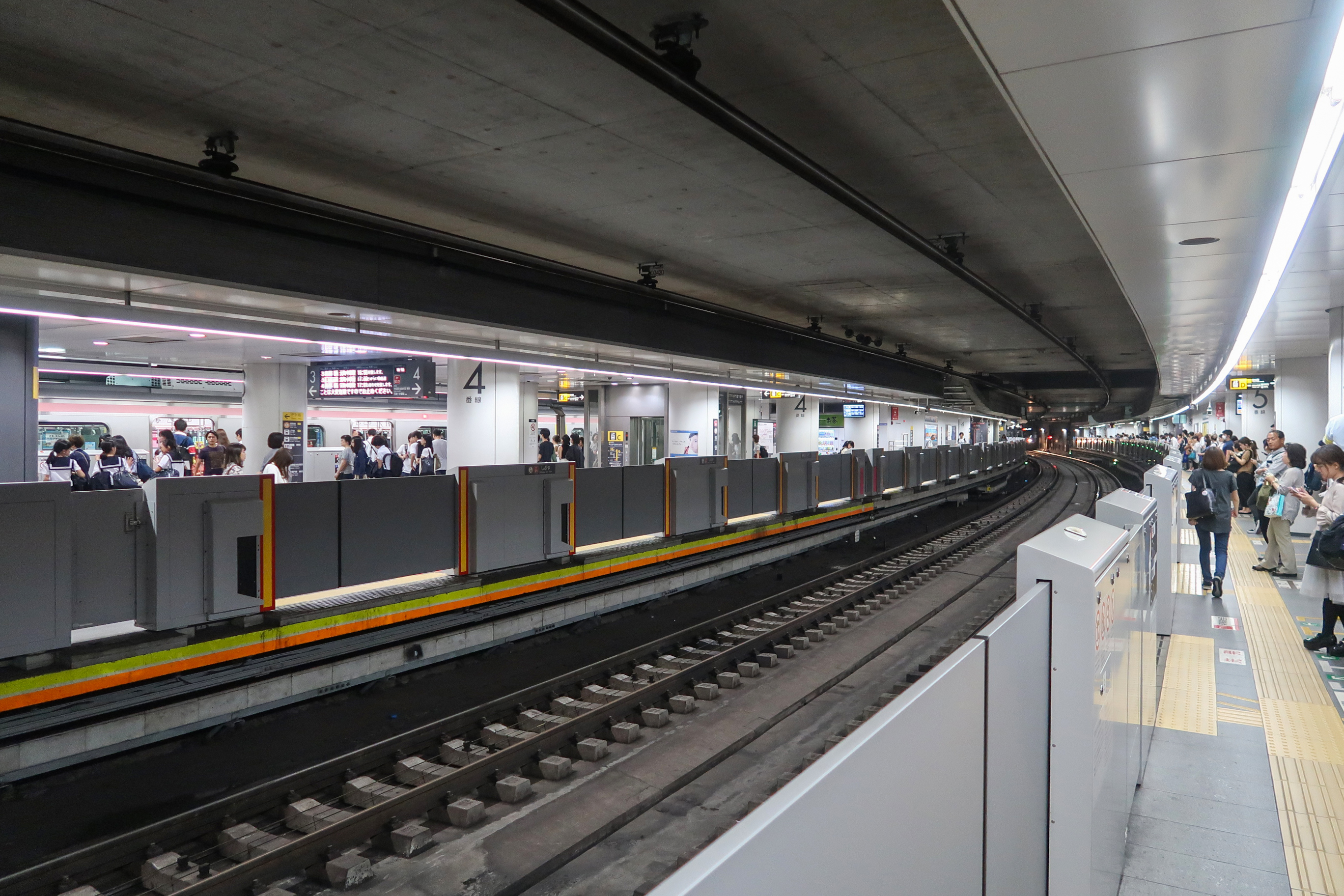
- Platforms 4 and 5 on the Toyoko Line

General information
- Location: 1-1 Dogenzaka Nichōme, Shibuya, Tokyo; Japan
- System: Tokyu Railway/Tokyo Metro station
- Operator: Tōkyū Railways (manager); Tokyo Metro
- Lines: Tōyoko Line; Fukutoshin Line
- Platforms: 2 island platforms
- Tracks: 4

Construction
- Accessible: Yes

Other information
- Station code: TY01, F-16

History
- Opened: 14 June 2008; 18 years ago
Services
Preceding station	Tōkyū Railways	Following station
Jiyūgaoka towards Motomachi-Chūkagai	S-Train (Weekends and national holidays)	Shinjuku-sanchome towards Seibu-Chichibu
Naka-meguro towards Motomachi-Chūkagai	F Liner	Meiji-jingumae towards Hannō or Ogawamachi
Naka-meguro towards Yokohama	Tōyoko Line Limited Express Commuter Express Express	through to Fukutoshin Line
Daikanyama towards Yokohama	Tōyoko Line Local	through to Fukutoshin Line
Preceding station	Tokyo Metro	Following station
through to Toyoko Line	Fukutoshin Line Express Commuter Express Local	Meiji-jingumae towards Wakoshi
Location

===== Platforms =====
Two underground island platforms on the fifth basement (B5F) level serve four tracks. Tokyu has been managing the station since the opening of the Fukutoshin Line in 2008, and the Toyoko Line uses platforms 3 and 4 since the start of through services with the two lines on 16 March 2013.

3-4
5-6
Tōyoko Line
Fukutoshin Line
- for Jiyūgaoka, Yokohama, and Shin-Yokohama
- Minatomirai Line for Motomachi-Chukagai
- Sotetsu Izumino Line for Shōnandai via the Tōkyū/Sōtetsu Shin-yokohama Line
for Shinjuku-sanchome, Ikebukuro, and Wakoshi
- Tobu Tojo Line for Shinrinkōen and Ogawamachi
- Seibu Ikebukuro Line for Hannō

==== Tokyo Metro Ginza Line ====
Shibuya Station 渋谷駅

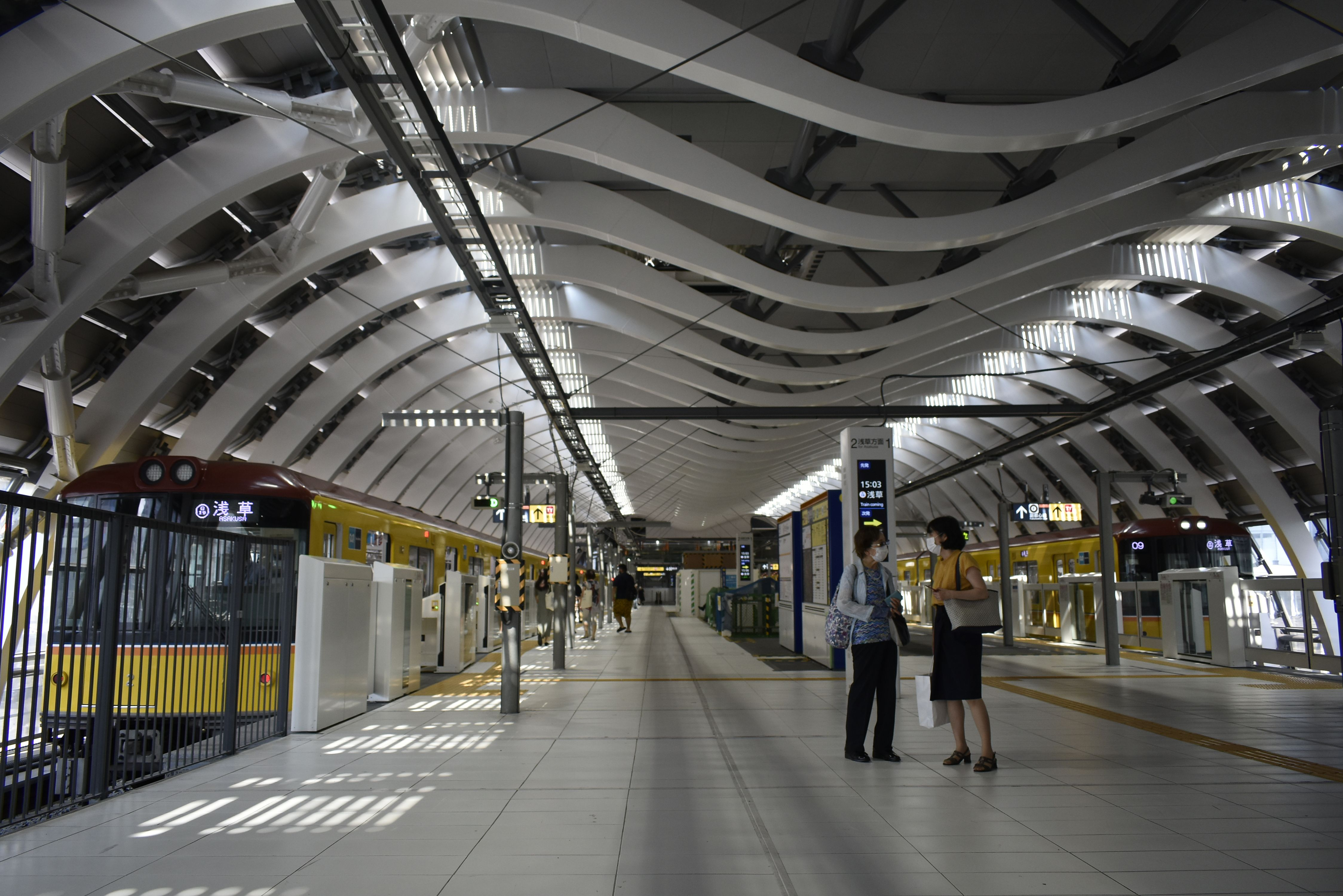
- The new Ginza Line platforms

General information
- Location: 1-1 Dogenzaka Itchōme, Shibuya, Tokyo; Japan
- System: Tokyo subway
- Owner: Tokyo Metro Co., Ltd.
- Operator: Tokyo Metro
- Platforms: 1 island platform
- Tracks: 2
- Connections: Bus terminal

Construction
- Accessible: Yes

Other information
- Station code: G-01

History
- Opened: December 20, 1938; 87 years ago
- Rebuilt: 2018–2019

Passengers
- FY2013: 212,136 daily

Services
Preceding station	Tokyo Metro	Following station
Terminus	Ginza Line	Omote-sando towards Asakusa
Location

===== Platforms =====
As of January 2020, one island platform serves two tracks. Until December 2019, two side platforms each served one track, with one platform for terminating services and one for services departing towards Asakusa.

Due to the distance between the Ginza and Hanzomon Line platforms, transfer information is announced at Omote-sando Station instead.

1-2	Ginza Line	for Akasaka-mitsuke, Ginza, Ueno, and Asakusa

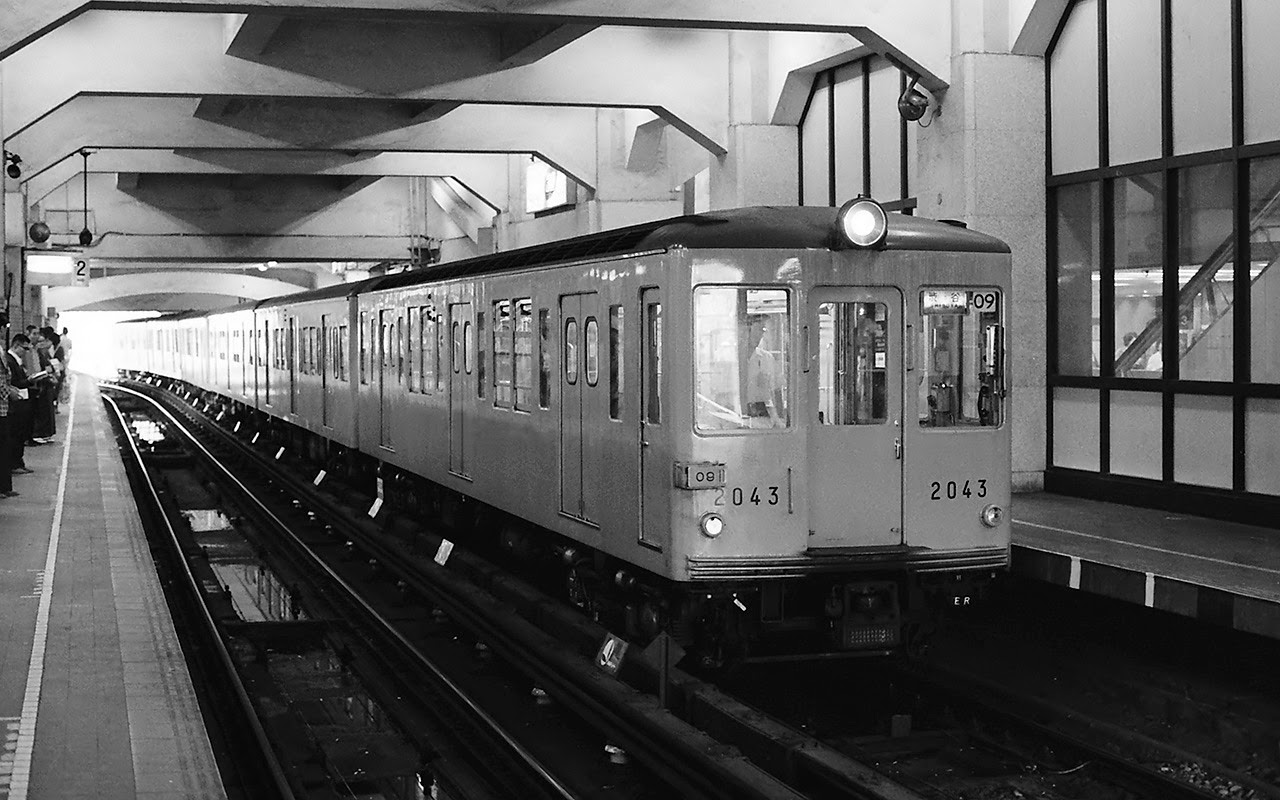
The Ginza Line platforms in 1977

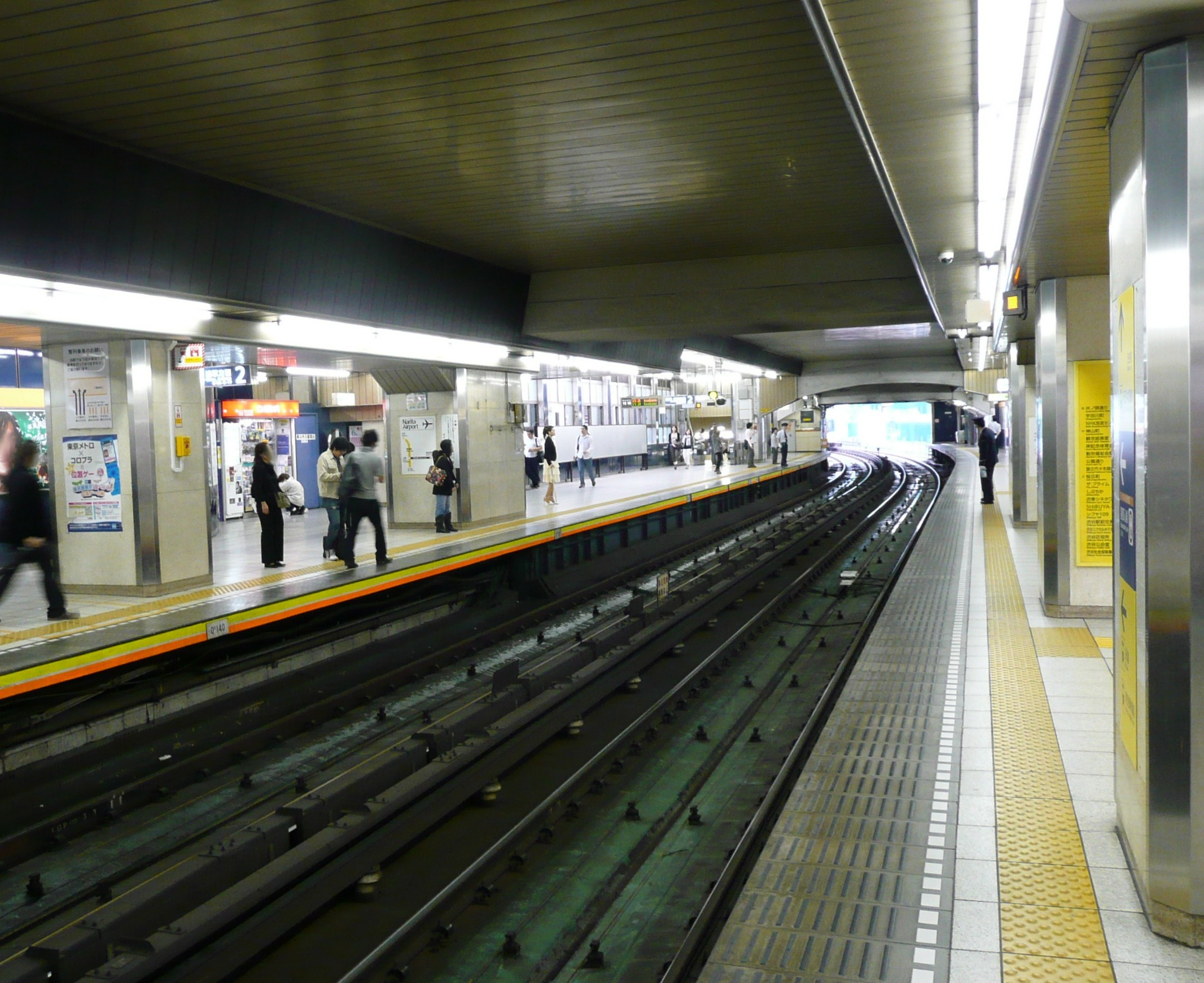
The same platforms in 2010

=== Keio Inokashira Line ===
Shibuya Station 渋谷駅

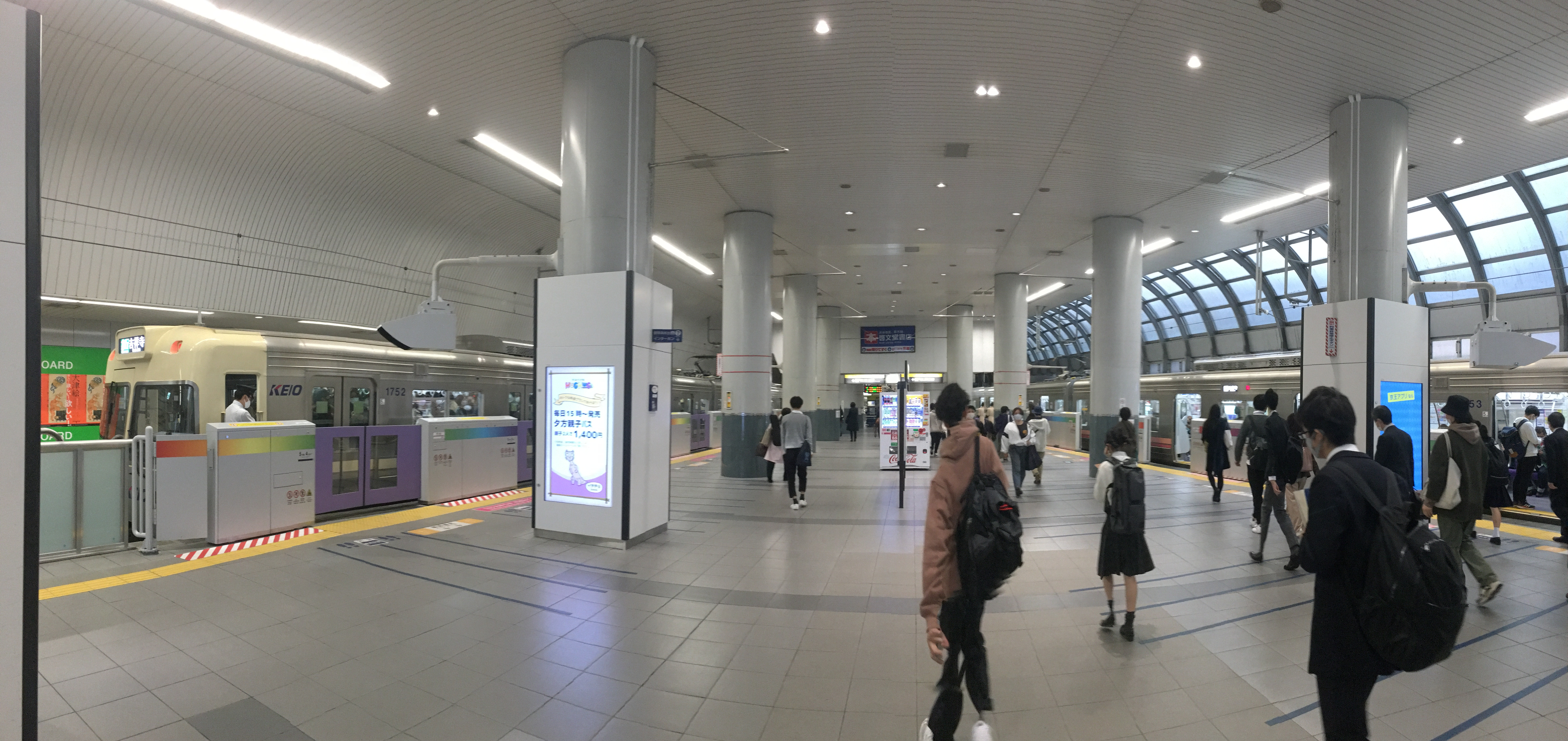
- The Keio Inokashira Line platforms

General information
- Location: 4-1 Dogenzaka Itchōme, Shibuya, Tokyo; Japan
- System: Keio station
- Operator: Keio Corporation
- Line: Keio Inokashira Line
- Tracks: 2

Other information
- Station code: IN01

History
- Opened: 1933; 93 years ago

Passengers
- FY2013: 730,849 daily

Services
Preceding station	Keio Corporation	Following station
Shimo-kitazawa towards Kichijōji	Inokashira Line Express	Terminus
Shinsen towards Kichijōji	Inokashira Line Local	Terminus
Location

==== Platforms ====
The Keio station consists of two bay platforms serving two tracks. It began operations on 1 August 1933.

1, 2	Keio Inokashira Line	for Shimo-Kitazawa, Meidaimae, Eifukuchō, and Kichijōji

=== Former Toyoko Line station ===
Shibuya Station 渋谷駅

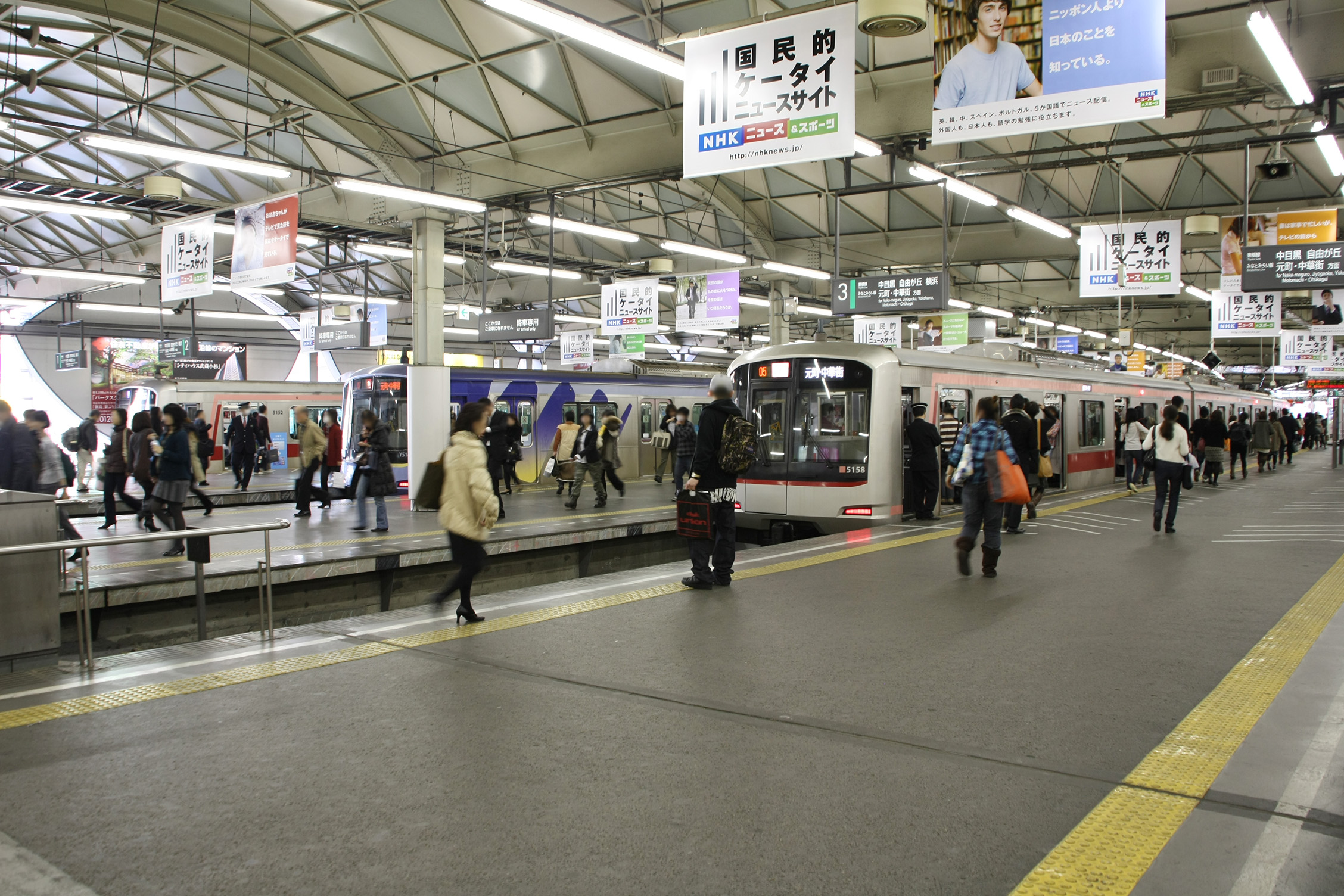
- Former Tokyu Toyoko Line platforms

General information
- Location: 2-24-1 Shibuya, Shibuya, Tokyo; Japan
- System: Tokyu station
- Operator: Tokyu Corporation
- Line: Tokyu Toyoko Line
- Tracks: 4

Other information
- Station code: TY-01

History
- Opened: 1927
- Closed: 15 March 2013

Former services
Preceding station	Tokyū Railways	Following station
Tokyu Toyoko Line
Naka-Meguro	Limited Express	Terminus
Naka-Meguro	Commuter Express	Terminus
Naka-Meguro	Express	Terminus
Daikan-yama	Local	Terminus
Location

The former above-ground Tokyu Toyoko Line terminal station platforms were taken out of use after the last train service on 15 March 2013. From the start of the revised timetable on 16 March 2013, Toyoko Line services used the underground platforms 3-4 shared with Tokyo Metro Fukutoshin Line services.

==== Platforms ====
The station had four 8-car long bay platforms numbered 1 to 4, serving four tracks.

1-4	■ Tokyu Toyoko Line	for Naka-Meguro, Jiyūgaoka, Yokohama, (Minatomirai Line) Motomachi-Chūkagai

== Passenger statistics ==
=== 1953－2000 ===
Source: Tokyo Metropolitan Government

- JR East
- Ginza Line
- Hanzomon Line
- Toyoko Line
- Shin-Tamagawa Line
- Inokashira Line

=== 2000－present ===
In fiscal year 2013, the JR East station was used by 378,539 passengers daily (boarding passengers only), making it the fifth-busiest JR East station. Over the same fiscal year, the Keio station was used by an average of 336,957 passengers daily (exiting and entering passengers), making it the busiest station on the Inokashira Line. In fiscal 2013, the Tokyo Metro Ginza station was used by an average of 212,136 passengers daily and the Tokyo Metro Hanzōmon and Fukutoshin stations were used by an average of 731,184 passengers daily. Note that the latter statistics consider passengers who travel through Shibuya station on a through service as users of the station, even if they did not disembark at the station. In fiscal 2013, the Tokyu Toyoko Line station was used by an average of 441,266 passengers daily and the Den-en-toshi Line station was used by an average of 665,645 passengers daily. The daily passenger figures for each operator in previous years are as shown below.

Fiscal year	JR East	Tokyu		Tokyo Metro	Keio
Fiscal year	JR East	Tōyoko Line	Den-en-toshi Line	Tokyo Metro	Keio
1999	423,336				323,180
2000	428,165				
2005	423,884	412,237	631,481		
2010	403,277	419,482	647,331		336,926
2011	402,766	420,163	641,781	217,117	335,475
2012	412,009	435,994	656,867	226,644	344,972
2013	378,539	441,266	665,645	212,136	336,957

- Note that JR East figures are for boarding passengers only.
- Note that the Tokyo Metro figures are for the Ginza Line station only.

Source: Tokyo Metropolitan Government

- JR East
- Ginza Line
- Hanzomon Line
- Fukutoshin Line
- Toyoko Line
- Den-en-toshi Line
- Inokashira Line

== Surrounding area ==
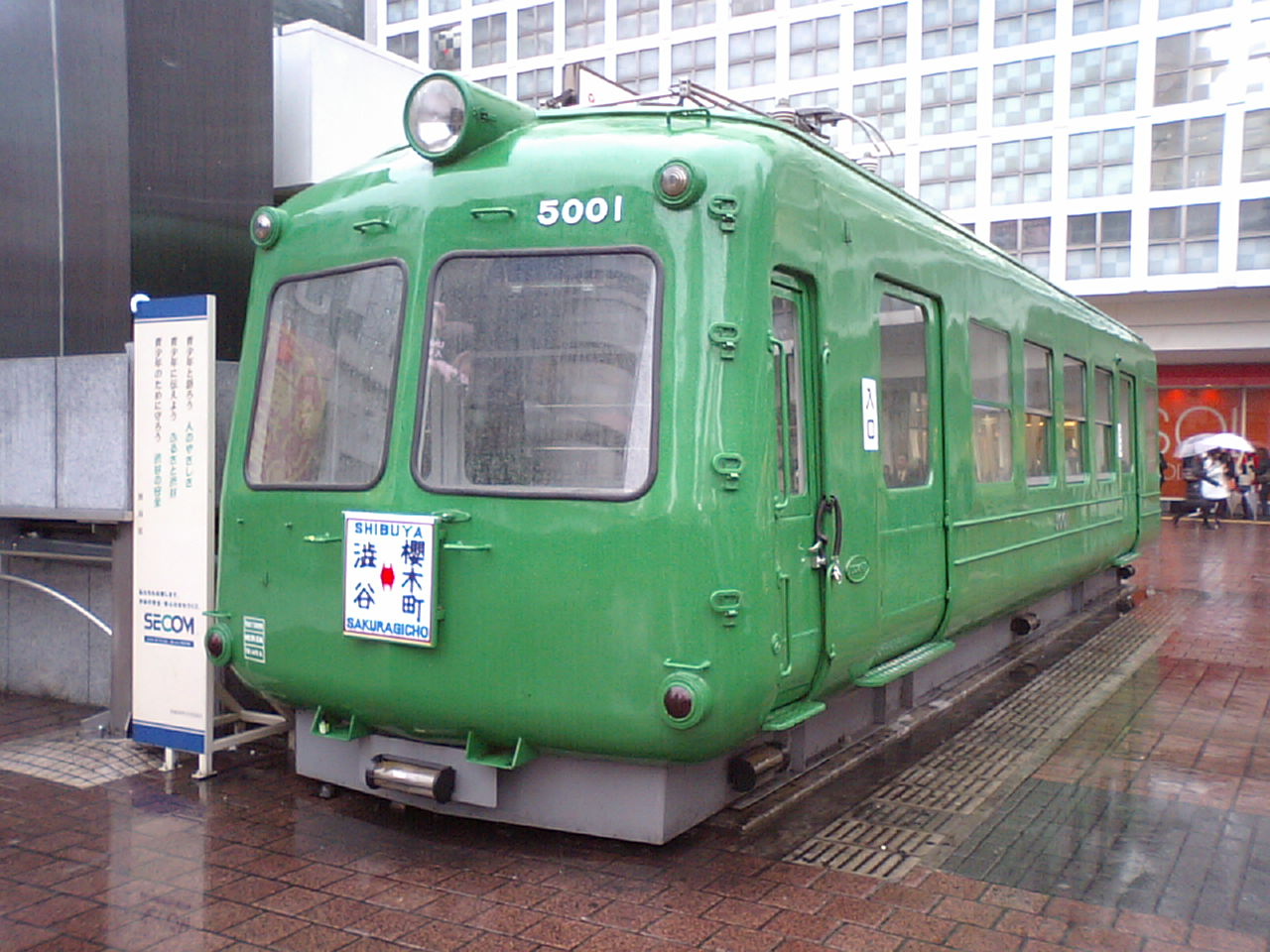
The sectioned body of a former Tokyu 5000 series "Green frog" carriage on static display near the Hachikō exits before it was removed in August 2020. It is now being displayed at Kosaka Railway Museum and Akitainu Visitors Center in Odate, Akita Prefecture (the birthplace of Hachikō)

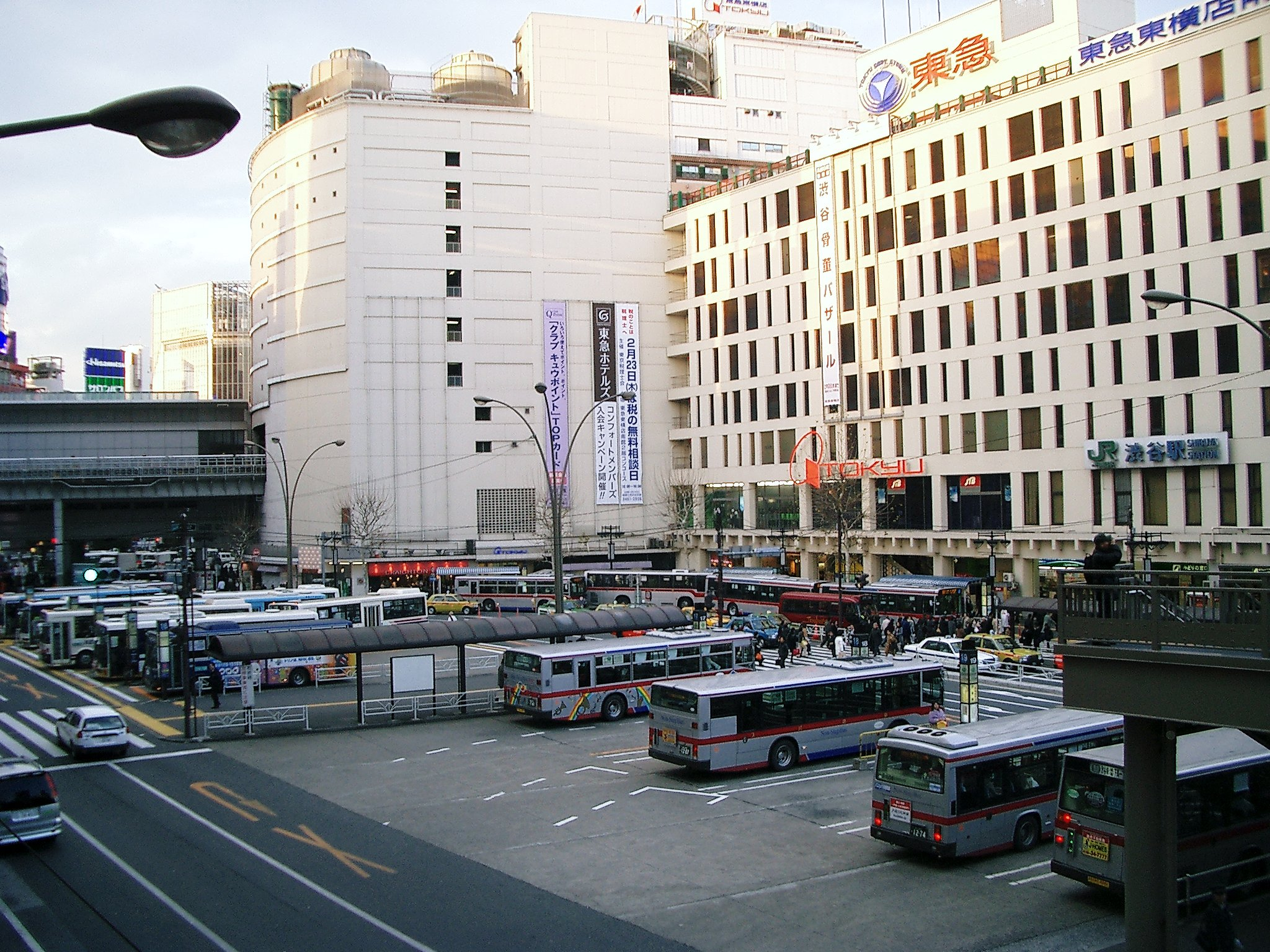
Bus terminal on the west side of Shibuya Station

Surrounding the station is the commercial center of Shibuya. The Tokyu Department Store is connected to the east gate of the station and several other department stores are within walking distance.

- Shibuya Ward Office
- NHK Broadcasting Center
- NHK Hall
- Shibuya Mark City
- Shibuya 109
- Shibuya Hikarie
- Yoyogi Park
- Miyashita Park

The Shibuya River flows directly under the station, to the east and parallel to the JR tracks. Unlike most other Japanese department stores, the east block of Tokyu Department Store closed in 2013, and due for demolition as a part of the Shibuya Station redevelopment plan, did not have basement retail space due to the river passing directly underneath. An escalator in the east block of the store was constructed over the river stops a few steps above floor level to make space for machinery underneath without the need for further excavation. Rivers are deemed public space under Japanese law, so building over one is normally illegal. It is not clear why this was allowed when the store buildings were first constructed in 1933.

== Cultural references ==
The station and its surrounding area serves as the setting for the manga/anime Jujutsu Kaisen from Chapters 79-136 (Episodes 32-47), the arc aptly named the “Shibuya Incident”. The show takes a particular interest in floor B5F in Episode 33 “Shibuya Incident - Gate, Open”.

== See also ==
- List of railway stations in Japan
- Transport in Greater Tokyo
