= Inokashira Park dismemberment incident =

1994 murder in Tokyo, Japan

The Inokashira Park dismemberment incident is an unsolved murder that occurred in Inokashira Park, a park between Mitaka and Musashino, Tokyo, in April 1994, wherein a dismembered body had been found. The incident is noted for the unusual state the victim was found in, in that they had been cut into 20-centimeter pieces with precision equated to that of a highly trained medical professional.

== Case summary ==
On the morning of April 23, 1994, in a trash can in Inokashira Park in Tokyo, a janitor working at the park accidentally opened a plastic bag, and found several human remains. Police were called to the scene, and found 27 severed limb and body parts scattered across several trash cans, all in waste disposal bags which had holes poked in for draining water. The type of knot tied on the bag was also peculiar, being a specific knot used by fishermen in the region. Most of the fingerprints on the victim's fingers and toes had been destroyed, but not in their entirety, giving the police substantial evidence in identifying the victim.

The body was determined to be that of a 35-year-old male architect referred to by authorities as "S", who had lived near the park. His body had been cut into 20-centimeter pieces using an electric saw with an unusual amount of precision. Afterwards, the body was carefully washed and drained of all its blood; something that would require the skills of a highly trained medical expert.

== State of body ==
The dismembered body parts were even in size, having been cut 20 cm in length and 30 cm in width, which was also close to the size of the openings of the trash cans in the park. The dismemberment was noted to have been done with a high level of skill, with an electric saw likely having been used as the weapon, and the muscle having been carefully cut to the specific dimensions. A specific cause of death could not be conclusively determined, as the body did not have any traces of physical battery, or any drugs in its system. Antemortem haemorrhage marks were present on the victim's ribs, indicating a possibility that he had been cut there whilst alive. However, no additional forensic evidence was found that could point to a culprit, leaving the murder unsolved.

The body had been completely washed of blood, with authorities noting that, in order to have accomplished this, the culprit would not only need extensive anatomical knowledge, but that the amount of water needed to wash and drain the blood from the body would require a large water supply that an ordinary household water system could not have.

Almost all fingerprints on the victim's fingers and toes had been scraped off, though the culprit had missed some of them given the authorities were able to identify the victim from the remaining prints.

The victim's torso, chest and genitals were not found among the dismembered body parts, and have not been discovered since. One theory posits that the trash bags containing these parts had been collected by janitorial workers the day before the discovery of the rest of the body, and taken to a waste disposal center.

== Victim information ==
"S" was a 35-year-old architect, living in the vicinity of Inokashira Park in the days leading up to his murder. "S" was also a member of an unidentified religious organization in Tokyo with which he had a close relationship. He had reportedly parted ways with an acquaintance on the midnight of the 22nd of April, after which his whereabouts were unknown.

After this event, only unconfirmed eyewitness accounts are able to explain the hours leading up to his death. One witness claimed that they saw a man who resembled "S" being beaten by two men at a department store near his house, with another stating that later, at 4:00 A.M, they saw two men at Inokashira Park displaying suspicious behavior and carrying plastic bags, though there were no signs of physical battery on the body, which calls the former account into suspicion.

Every friend and acquaintance of "S" was interviewed at length, and his room was thoroughly searched, but no evidence pointing to a culprit could be found. Eleven months later, many officers from the investigative team were recruited to investigate the sarin gas attack on the Tokyo subway, leaving the case with very few people working on it. Finally, in 2009, the statute of limitations expired.

== Aftermath ==
While the case initially attracted the attention of Japan's mass media, the crash of China Airlines Flight 140 occurred on the 26th of April, three days after the murder. It was the deadliest accident in the airlines' history, which caused the media's attention to be diverted there. The investigators present on the case worked on it for another eleven months, until most were recruited to investigate the 1995 sarin gas attacks on the Tokyo subway system, leaving the case ultimately unsolved. The statute of limitations for the case expired in 2009, 15 years after the murder.

Multiple theories have been put forward to explain the murder, or to identify the perpetrator. This includes the person "S" broke up with attacking, or organizing the attack as revenge. Another posits that the religious organization "S" belonged to had murdered him, though a motive for such an act cannot be discerned. However, as the dismemberment of "S"'s body had been so meticulous, requiring not only someone with medical knowledge, but access to an industrial water supply, the most common theory is that "S" had fallen afoul of an organized crime group in the area, as they would have had the resources to carry out such an attack.

Lending further credence to this final theory was testimony from a man who spoke out in 2015, going by the pseudonym "K". "K", who had been doing business at the time of the murder, claimed that he had been mistaken for "S" on multiple occasions, with his warehouse being in the immediate vicinity of "S"'s house.

"K" had worked as a supplier for many street vendors in the area, and admitted to having a bias against foreign street vendors who attempted to open up shop in his area, often using pressure tactics to drive them out. One foreign vendor, however, turned out to have links to an unspecified foreign criminal organization. "K" claimed to have been extensively surveilled by this organization and, fearing a reprisal, booked a hotel in the city to hide from them.

While staying there, "K" saw a report on the murder, as well as footage showing "S"'s house near to his, leading the man to believe that "S" had been the victim of mistaken identity, and that he had been murdered under the assumption he was actually "K". "K" feared the organization would realize their mistake if he immediately revealed himself, and thus left the line of work and kept his own account quiet for years afterwards.

== See also ==
- List of unsolved murders (1980–1999)

== Sources ==
- "【衝撃事件『未解決』の核心】異常さ際立つ猟奇的犯行 なぜ捜査は暗礁に…井の頭公園バラバラ殺人（上）". Sankei Shinbun. April 2009.
- Shincho 45. No. October 1999.
- Inomata, Shinjiro. "井の頭公園バラバラ殺人」事件は"人違い殺人"だった【後編】". Daily News Online. Archived from the original on 8 February 2016.
