= Mitakadai Station =

Railway station in Mitaka, Tokyo, Japan

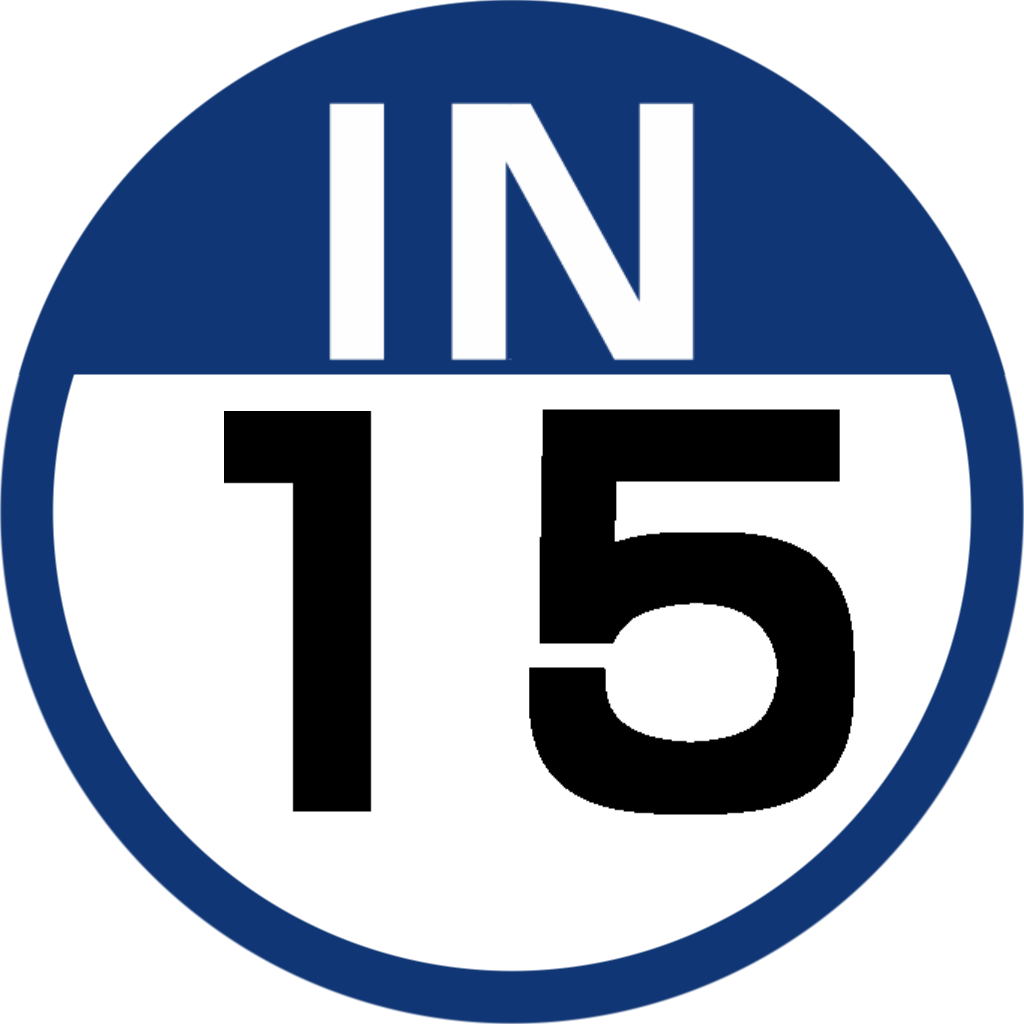
Mitakadai Station 三鷹台駅

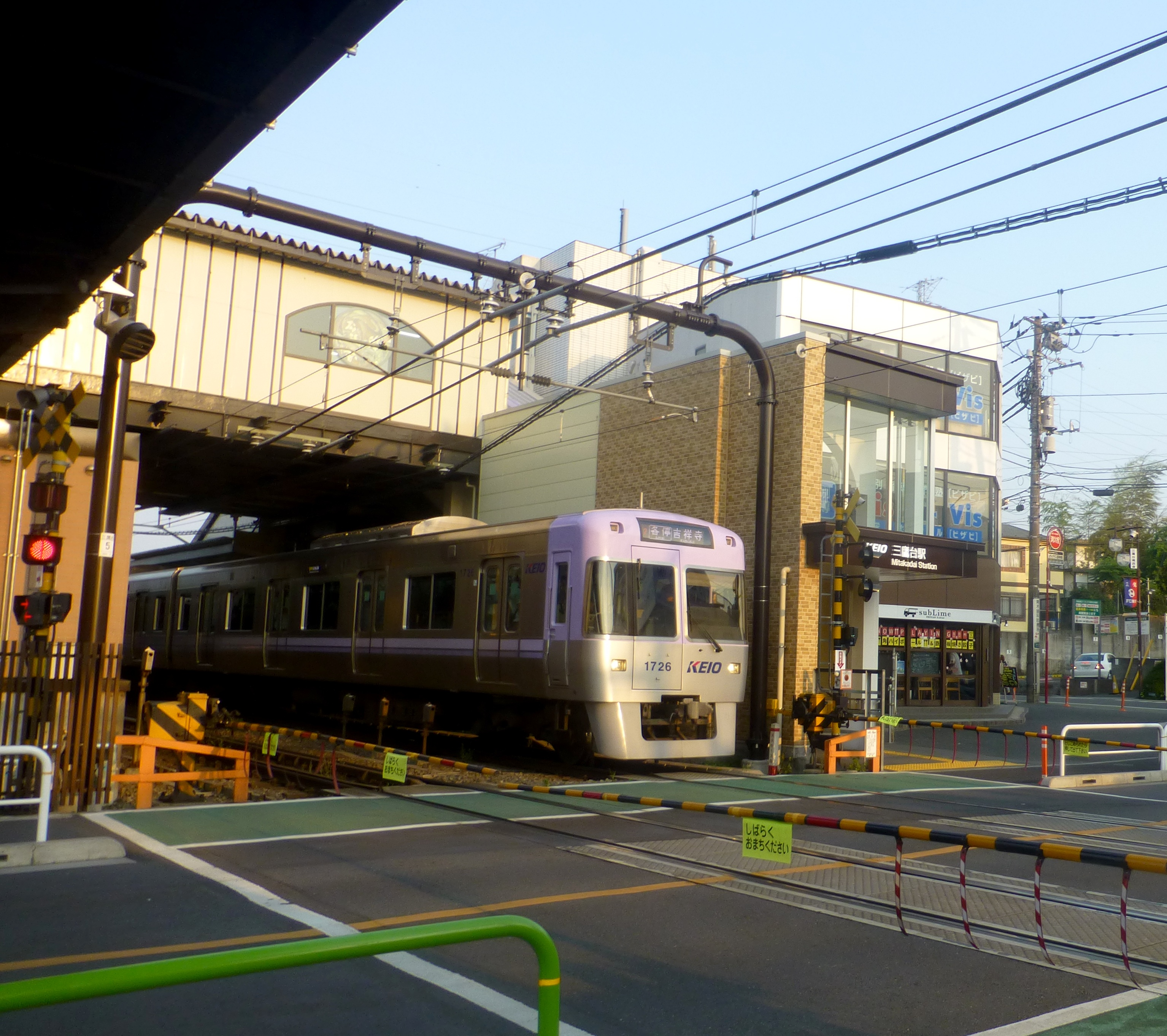
- Mitakadai Station entrance, May 2016

General information
- Location: 1-32-1 Inogashira, Mitaka-shi, Tokyo 181-0001; Japan
- Coordinates: 35.6922°N 139.5889°E
- Operator: Keio Corporation
- Line: Keio Inokashira Line
- Distance: 11.2 km from Shibuya
- Platforms: 2 side platforms
- Connections: Bus stop

Other information
- Station code: IN15
- Website: Official website

History
- Opened: August 1, 1933; 93 years ago

Passengers
- FY 2019: 22,072

Services
Preceding station	Keio Corporation	Following station
Inokashira-kōen towards Kichijōji	Inokashira Line Local	Kugayama towards Shibuya
Location
- Location within Tokyo Location within Japan

Mitakadai Station (三鷹台駅, Mitakadai-eki) is a passenger railway station located in the city of Mitaka, Tokyo, Japan, operated by the private railway operator Keio Corporation.

== Lines ==
Mitakadai Station is served by the 12.7 km Keio Inokashira Line from Shibuya in Tokyo to Kichijōji. Located between Kugayama and Inokashira-kōen, it is 11.2 km from the Shibuya terminus.

== Service pattern ==
Only all-stations "Local" services stop at this station. During the daytime, there are eight services per hour in either direction.

== Station layout ==
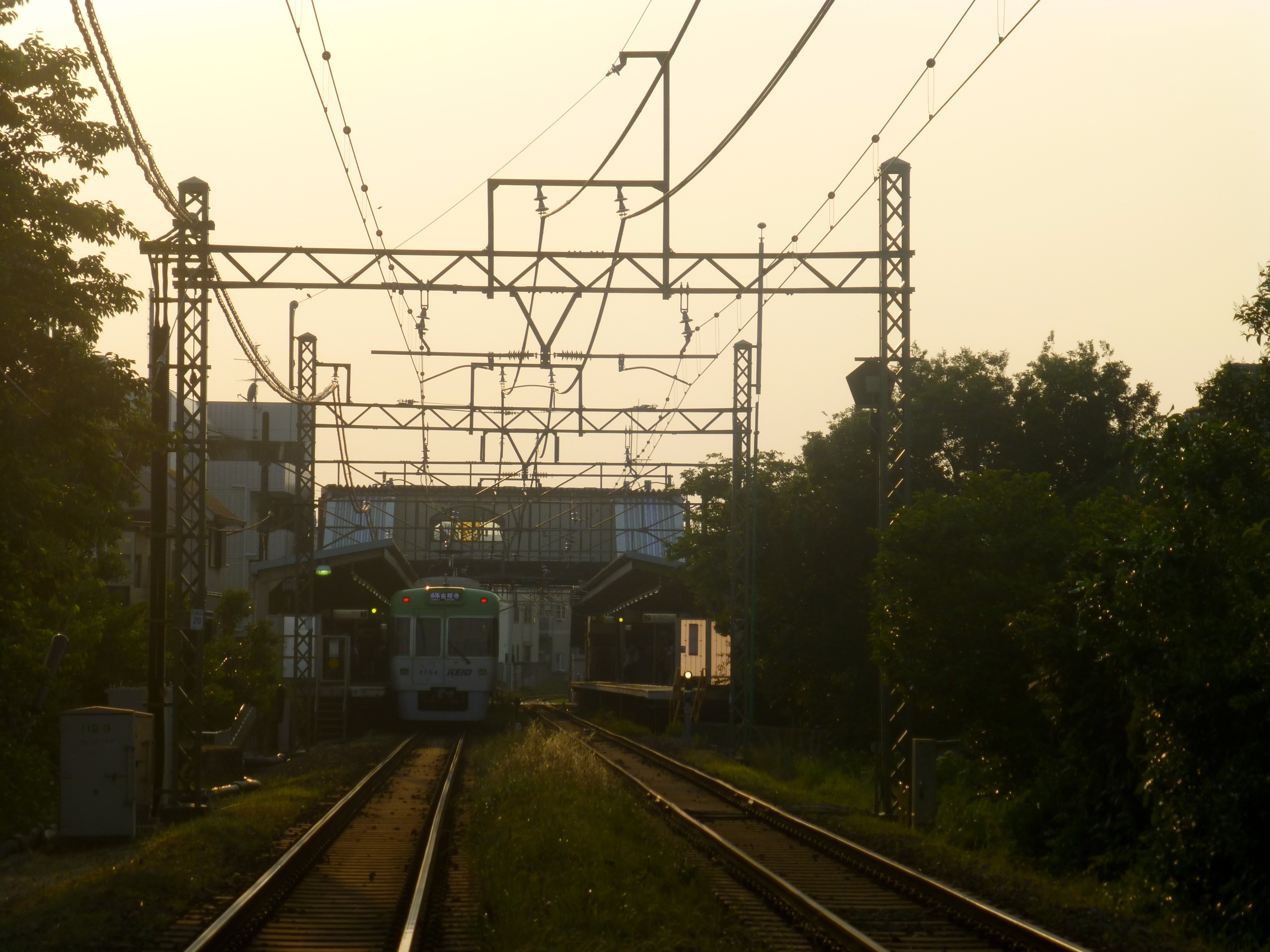
View of the platforms and a train, May 2016

The station consists of two ground-level side platforms serving two tracks. The station building is built above the tracks.

There are elevators from the concourse to each of the two platforms, and to the north exit of the station. The stairway from the north exit is connected by a pedestrian bridge over the road below, which the rails also cross.

There are toilets accessible from platform one, with a "multi-purpose" toilet as well as men's and women's toilets.

=== Platforms ===
1	Keio Inokashira Line	for Kichijōji
2	Keio Inokashira Line	for Shimo-Kitazawa, Meidaimae, and Shibuya

== History ==
The station opened on 1 August 1933.

From 22 February 2013, station numbering was introduced on Keio lines, with Mitakadai Station becoming "IN15".

== Passenger statistics ==
In fiscal 2019, the station was used by an average of 22,072 passengers daily.

The passenger figures for previous years are as shown below.

Fiscal year	Daily average
2005	22,165
2010	22,832
2015	22,760

== Surrounding area ==
- Kanda River
- St. Margaret's Junior College
- St. Margaret's Junior & Senior High School
- St. Margaret's Elementary School

== See also ==
- List of railway stations in Japan
