= Japan Lutheran College =

Private university in Tokyo, Japan

Coordinates: 35°41′17.7″N 139°32′6.7″E

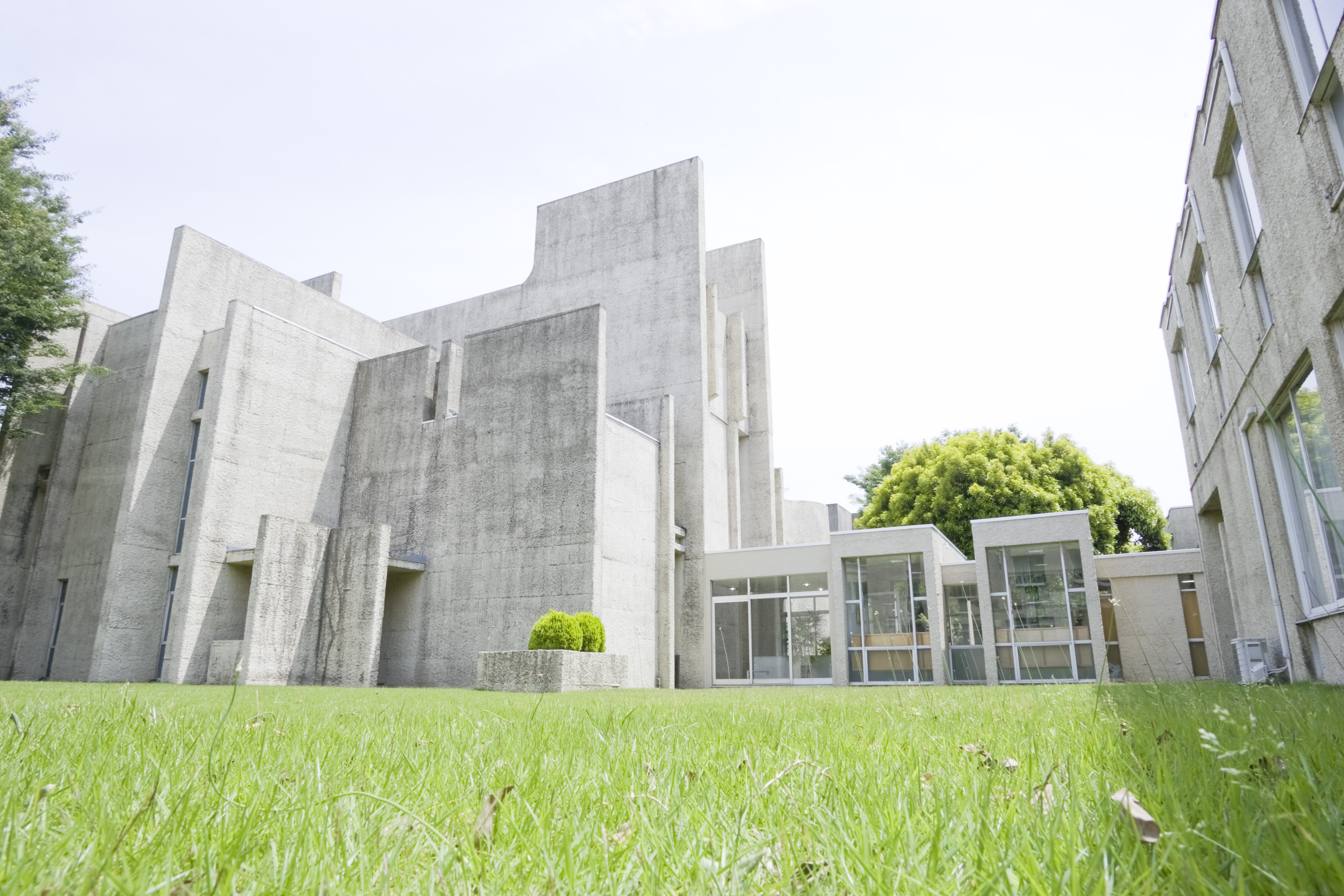
Buildings at Japan Lutheran College

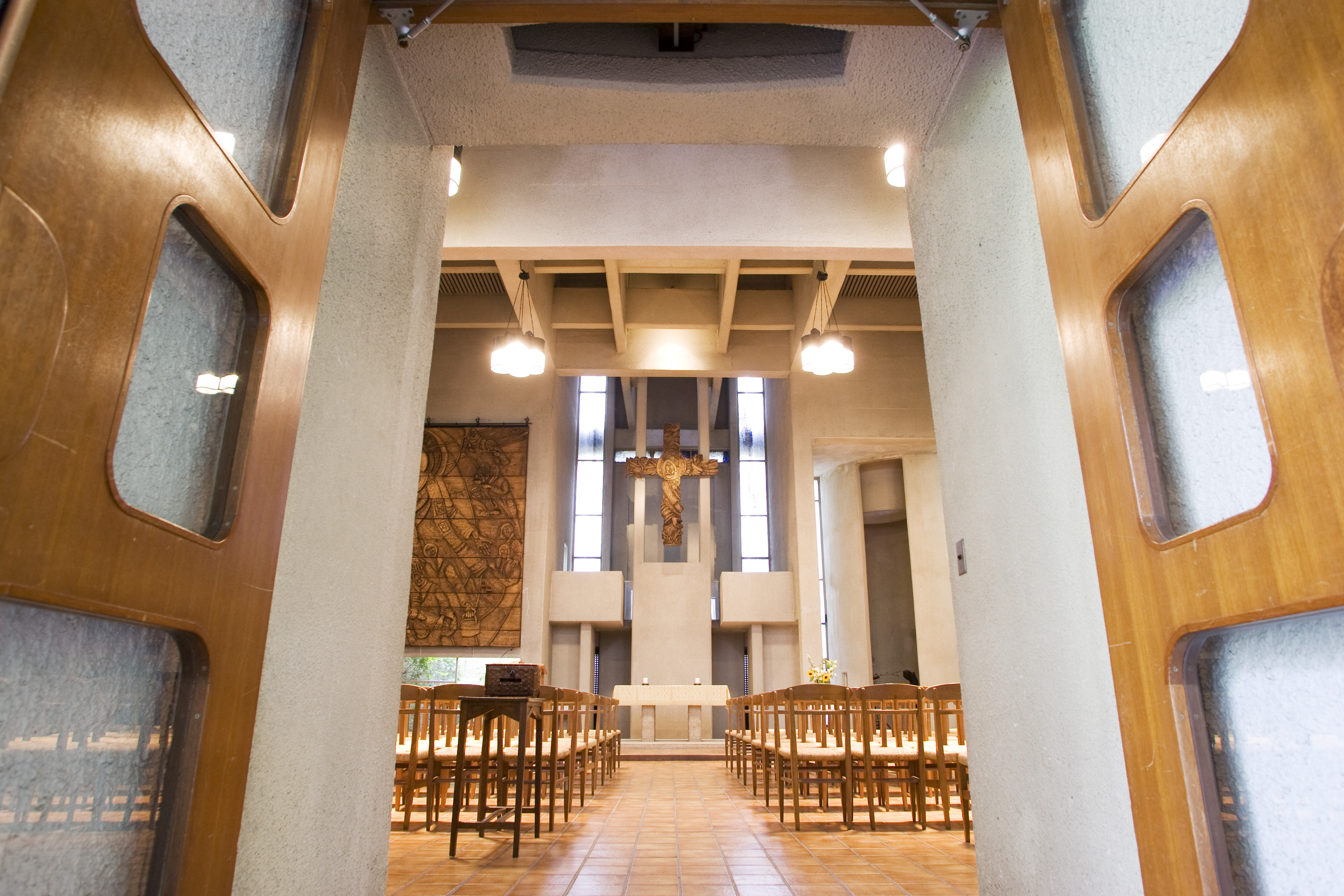
Chapel at the college

Japan Lutheran College (ルーテル学院大学, Rūteru gakuin daigaku) is a private university in Mitaka, Tokyo, Japan.

== History ==
The predecessor of the school was founded 1909 in Kumamoto, Kumamoto. It was chartered as a university in 1964. The present name was adopted in 1996.
