= Mitaka, Tokyo =

Mitaka 三鷹市
- City
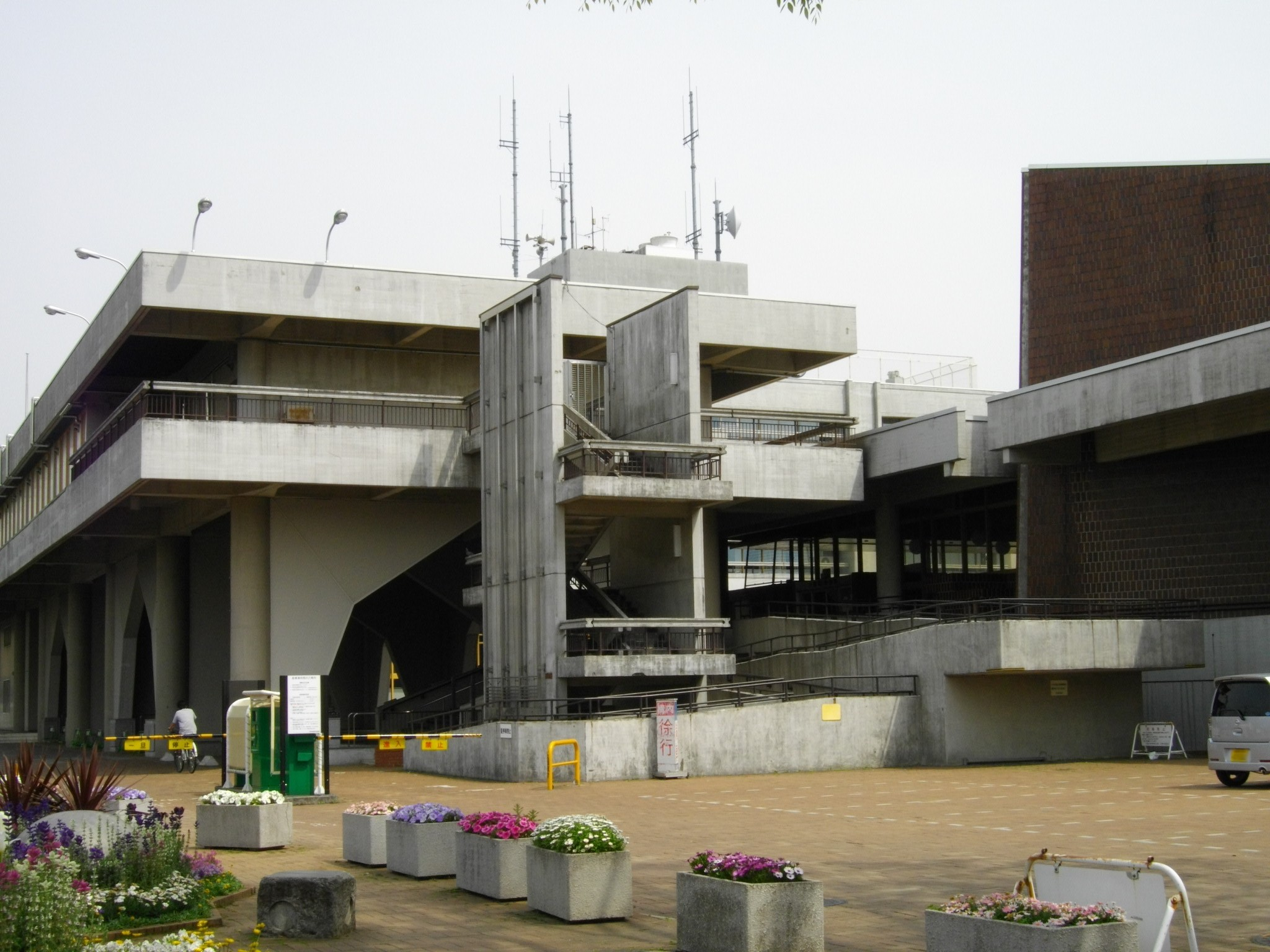
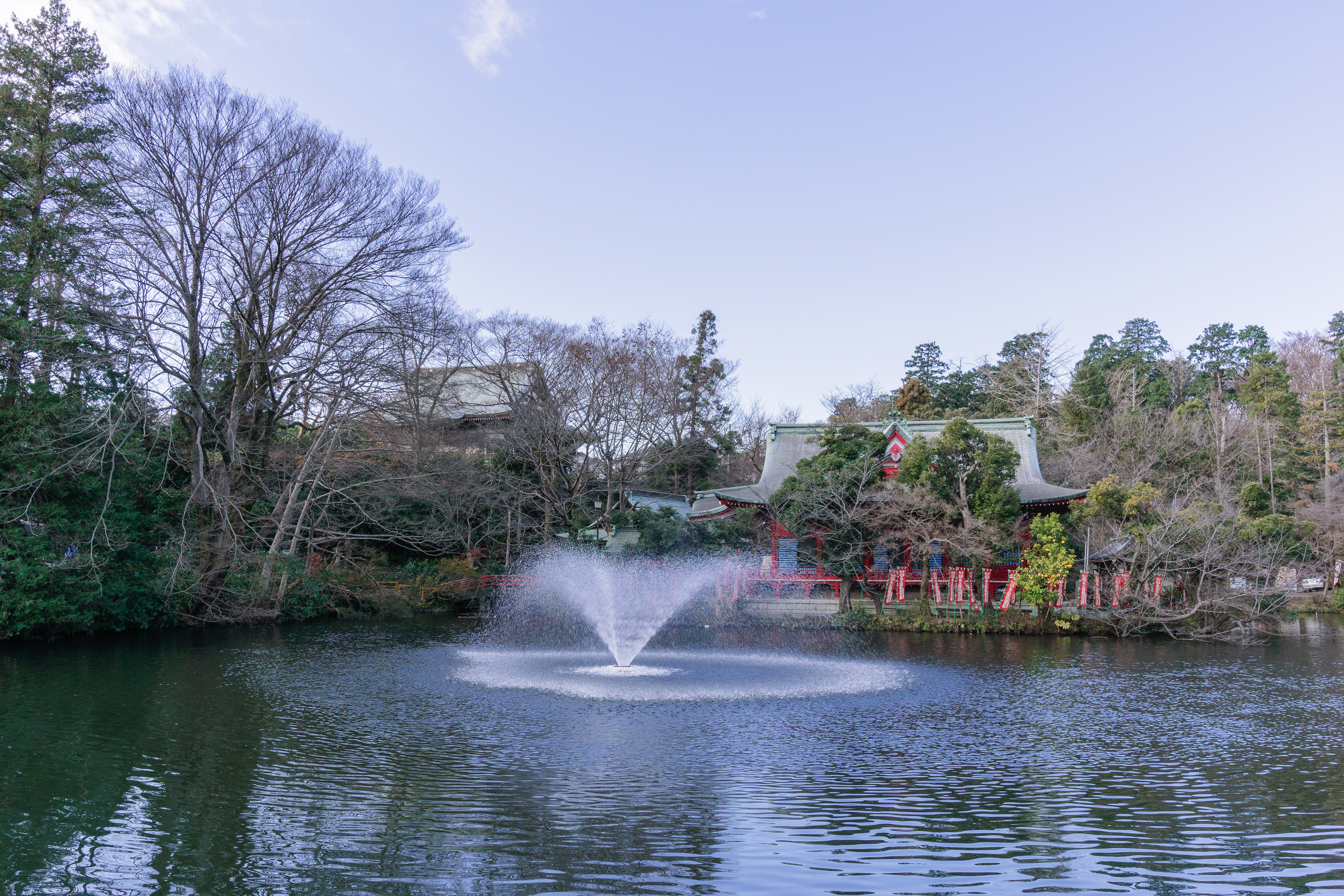
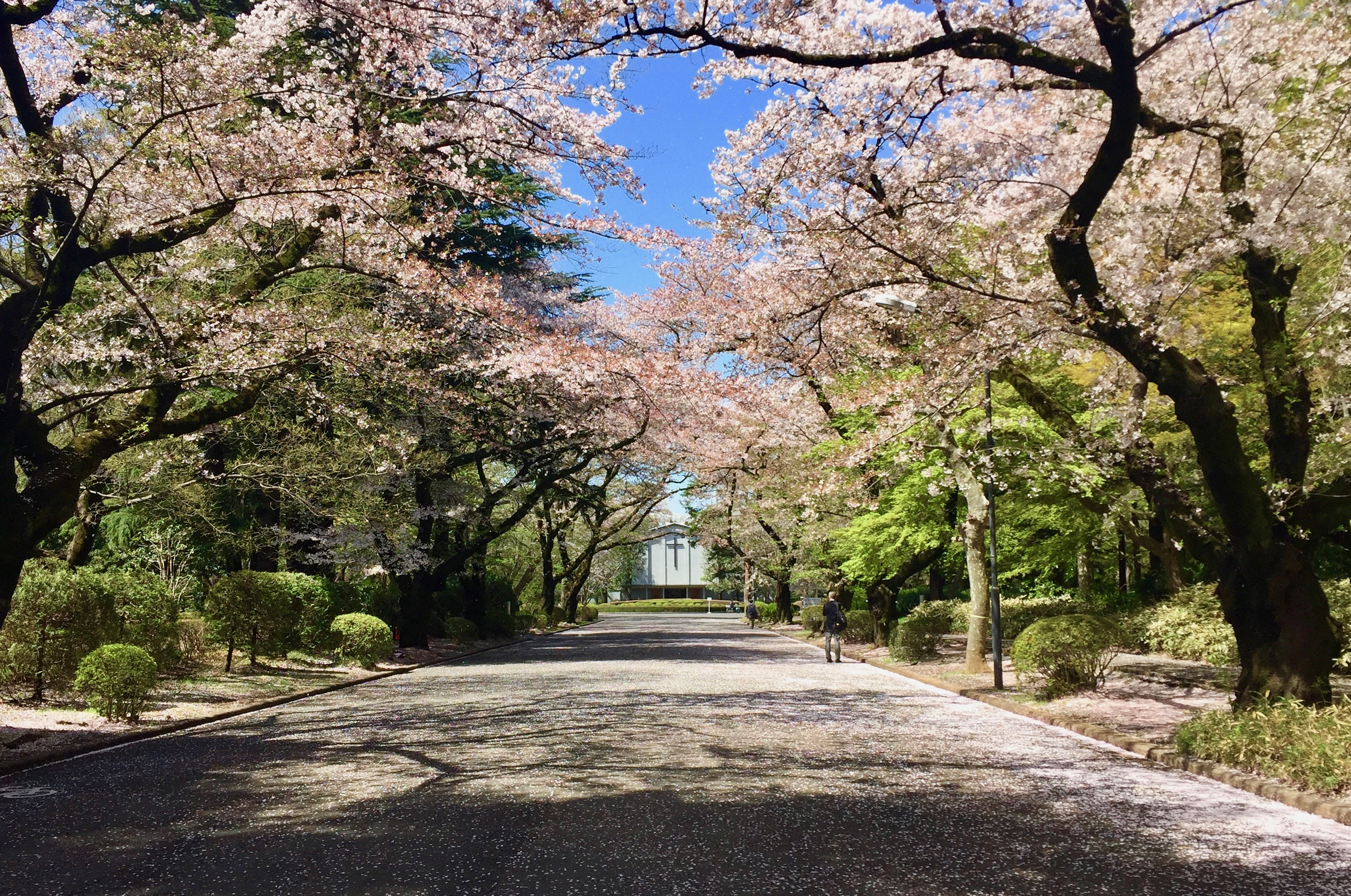
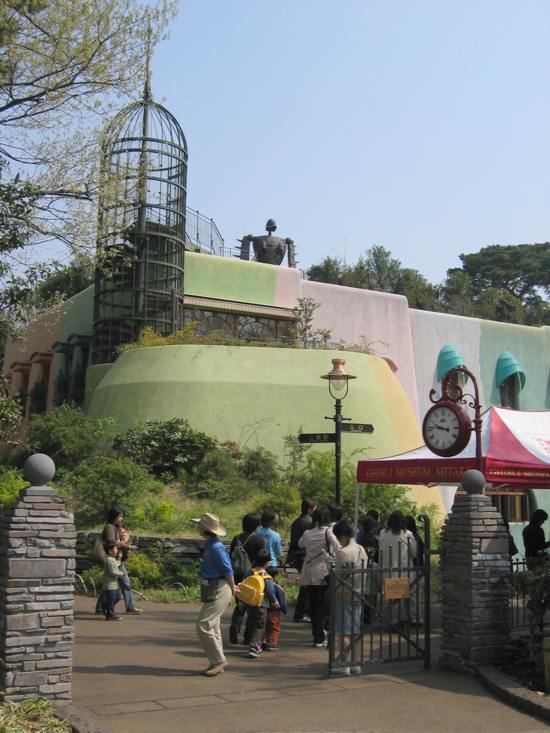
- Clockwise from top: Mitaka City Hall; Inokashira Park; the Ghibli Museum; the entrance of International Christian University campus

- Flag Seal

- Location of Mitaka in Tokyo

- Coordinates: 35°41′0.8″N 139°33′34.3″E
- Country: Japan
- Region: Kantō
- Prefecture: Tokyo

Government
  - Mayor: Takashi Kawamura (since April 2019)

Area
  - Total: 16.42 km^{2} (6.34 sq mi)

Population (March 2021)
  - Total: 190,403
  - Density: 11,600/km^{2} (30,030/sq mi)
- Time zone: UTC+9 (Japan Standard Time)
- Symbols
  - Tree: Ginkgo biloba
  - Flower: Malus halliana
- Phone number: 042-558-1111
- Address: 1-1-1 Nozaki, Mitaka-shi, Tokyo 181-8555
- Website: Official website

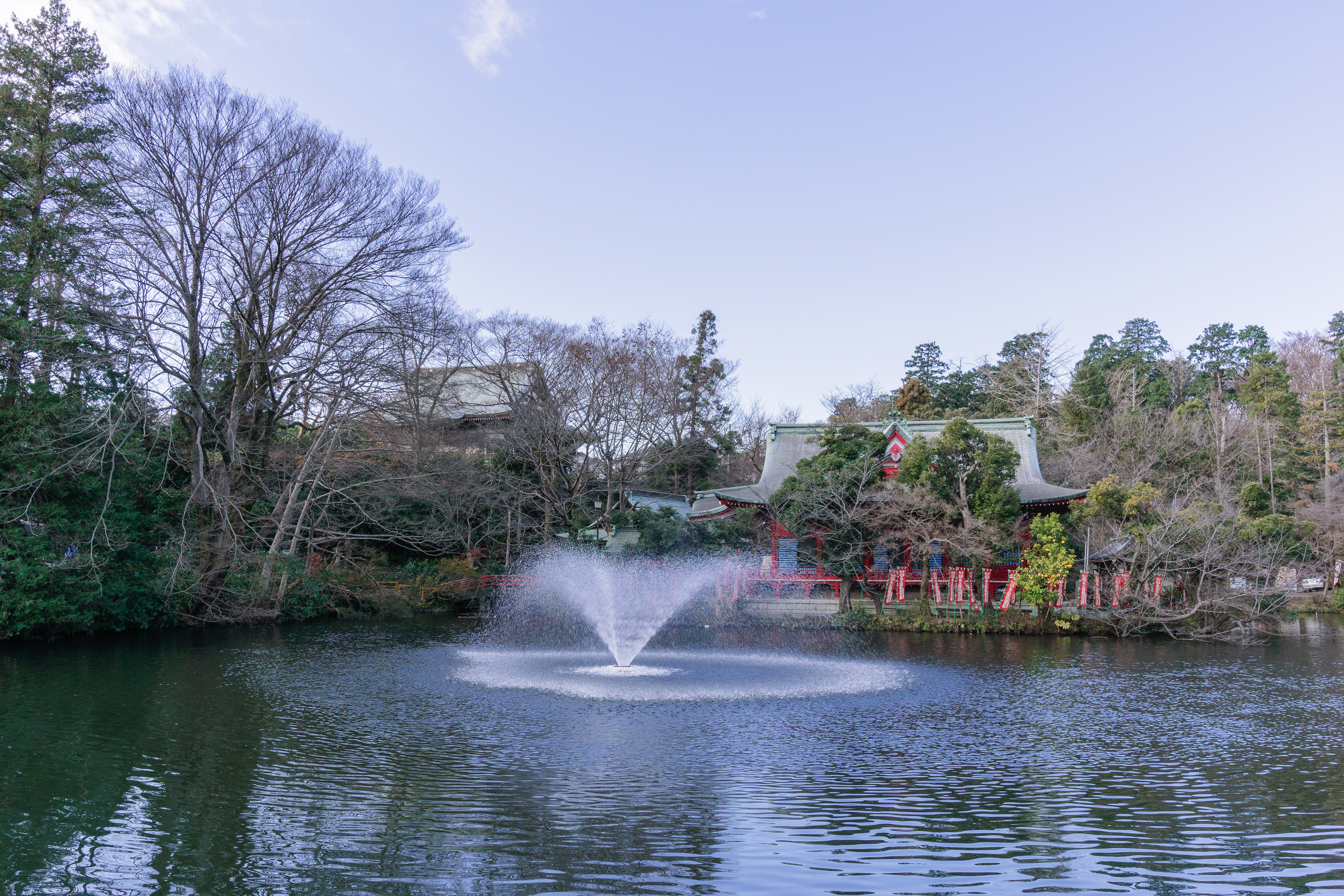
Inokashira Park in Mitaka

Mitaka (三鷹市, Mitaka-shi) is a city in the Western Tokyo region of Tokyo Metropolis, Japan. As of 1 March 2021, the city had an estimated population of 190,403, and a population density of 12,000 persons per km^{2}. The total area of the city was 16.42 square kilometres (6.34 sq mi).

== History ==
The area of present-day Mitaka was part of ancient Musashi Province. In the post-Meiji Restoration cadastral reform of 22 July 1878, the area became part of Kitatama District in Kanagawa Prefecture. The village of Mitaka was created on 1 April 1889 with the establishment of modern municipalities law. Kitatama District was transferred to the administrative control of Tokyo Metropolis on 1 April 1893. Mitaka was raised to town status in 1940. In 1949, the Mitaka incident, one of a series of unexplained fatal train accidents around the same period of time, occurred at Mitaka Station. Mitaka City was officially founded on 3 November 1950. A motion to merge with neighboring Musashino City failed in 1955 by a single vote in the Mitaka city assembly.

== Geography ==
Mitaka is located on the Kantō Plain, just outside the 23 special wards of Tokyo Metropolis, which are on its eastern borders. The Tamagawa Aqueduct canal, which runs alongside Mitaka station, has an important place in history, built in 1653 to feed the local metropolis. It is also the place where novelist Osamu Dazai died by suicide in 1948. The National Astronomical Observatory of Japan is located in Mitaka.

=== Surrounding municipalities ===
Tokyo Metropolis

- Chōfu
- Koganei
- Musashino
- Setagaya
- Suginami

=== Climate ===
Mitaka has a humid subtropical climate (Köppen Cfa) characterized by warm summers and cool winters with light to no snowfall. The average annual temperature in Mitaka is 14.5 °C. The average annual rainfall is 1647 mm with September as the wettest month. The temperatures are highest on average in August, at around 26.0 °C, and lowest in January, at around 3.1 °C.

== Demographics ==
Per Japanese census data, the population of Mitaka increased rapidly in the 1950s and 1960s. In 1994 there were 2,585 foreign residents in Mitaka, including 726 from North and South Korea, 713 from China, 441 from the United States, 114 from the Philippines, and 108 from the United Kingdom. Of all municipalities in Japan, Mitaka had the highest proportion of Chinese returnees.

Historical population
Year	Pop.	±%
1920	5,725	—
1930	8,218	+43.5%
1940	24,247	+195.0%
1950	54,820	+126.1%
1960	98,038	+78.8%
1970	155,693	+58.8%
1980	164,526	+5.7%
1990	165,564	+0.6%
2000	171,612	+3.7%
2010	186,083	+8.4%
2020	195,391	+5.0%

== Government ==
Mitaka has a mayor-council form of government with a directly elected mayor and a unicameral city council of 28 members. Mitaka contributes two members to the Tokyo Metropolitan Assembly. In terms of national politics, the city is part of Tokyo 22nd district of the lower house of the Diet of Japan.

== Economy ==
Mitaka is primarily a bedroom community for Tokyo. A number of animation studios, including Pierrot, Silver Link. and Telecom Animation Film have their corporate headquarters in Mitaka. A short-lived video game manufacturer TAD Corporation was founded and headquartered in the same location. Subaru Tecnica International has its headquarters in Mitaka.

== Education ==
=== Colleges and universities ===
- Graduate University for Advanced Studies – Department of Astronomical Science, School of Physical Sciences
- International Christian University – Japan's oldest and largest American-style university, founded on 15 June 1949.
- Japan Lutheran College
- Kokugakuin Tochigi Junior College
- Kyorin University – School of Medicine, Kyorin University Hospital (at Hospital Campus); Faculty of Health Sciences, Faculty of Social Studies, Faculty of Foreign Studies (at Inokashira Campus)
- Tokyo Union Theological Seminary
- University of Tokyo – the Institute of Astronomy, Faculty of Science; Mitaka International Hall of Residence

=== Primary and secondary schools ===
- Mikata city operates 15 public elementary schools and seven public middle schools. There is also one private elementary school and three private middle schools.
- Mitaka Secondary School (東京都立三鷹中等教育学校) is operated by the Tokyo Metropolitan Government Board of Education. There are also four private high schools, including part of the campus of the International Christian University High School.

Private primary and secondary schools:

- Taisei High School
- Kokugakuin Kugayama Junior High/High School
- Hosei University Junior and Senior High School (法政大学中学高等学校)
- Musashi International School, formerly Little Angels International School

Public junior high schools:

- No. 1 Junior High School (第一中学校)
- No. 2 Junior High School (第二中学校)
- No. 3 Junior High School (第三中学校)
- No. 4 Junior High School (第四中学校)
- No. 5 Junior High School (第五中学校)
- No. 6 Junior High School (第六中学校)
- No. 7 Junior High School (第七中学校)

Public elementary schools:

- No. 1 (第一小学校)
- No. 2 (第二小学校)
- No. 3 (第三小学校)
- No. 4 (第四小学校)
- No. 5 (第五小学校)
- No. 6 (第六小学校)
- No. 7 (第七小学校)
- Hanesawa (羽沢小学校)
- Higashidai (東台小学校)
- Iguchi (井口小学校)
- Kitano (北野小学校)
- Minamiura (南浦小学校)
- Nakahara (中原小学校)
- Osawadai (大沢台小学校)
- Takayama (高山小学校)

== Transportation ==
=== Railway ===
JR East – Chuo Main Line

- Mitaka

Keio Corporation - Keio Inokashira Line

- Mitakadai – Inokashira-kōen

=== Highway ===
- Chūō Expressway
- Tokyo Gaikan Expressway

== Local attractions ==
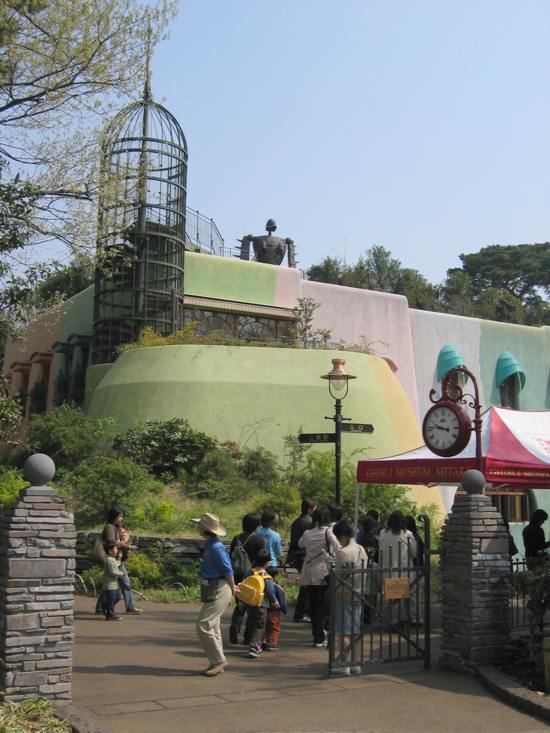
The Ghibli Museum in Mitaka

- Ghibli Museum
- Inokashira Park
- Nogawa Park
- Yuzo Yamamoto Memorial Museum

== Notable people from Mitaka ==
- Hiroki Azuma, cultural critic, novelist, and philosopher
- Masahiro Chono, professional wrestler (originally from Seattle, Washington)
- Akira Fuse, singer
- Tsubasa Honda, actress, model
- Ryo Kimura, actor
- Satoshi Ohno, singer, actor, and member of Arashi
- Yoshikazu Tanaka, businessman, founder of GREE, Inc.
- Yūko Tsushima, author, fiction writer, essayist and critic
- Eiji Wentz, singer, actor, entertainer, and member of the singer-songwriter duo WaT

== See also ==
- Inokashira Park dismemberment incident
- Mitaka incident
