= Nippon Veterinary and Life Science University =

Private university in Tokyo

Coordinates: 35.7018°N 139.5474°E

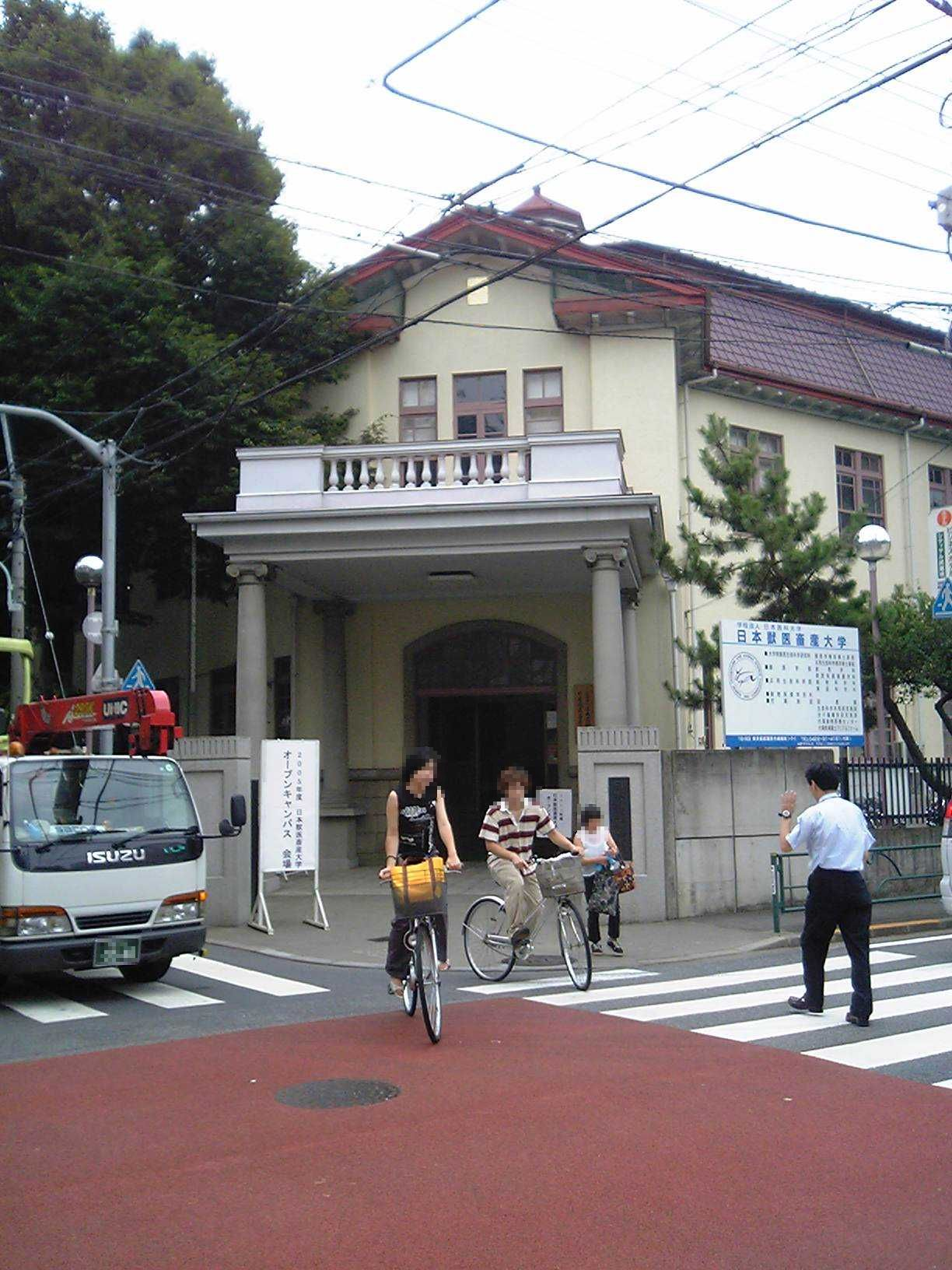
Nippon Veterinary and Life Science University

Nippon Veterinary and Life Science University (日本獣医生命科学大学, Nippon jūi seimei kagaku daigaku), NVLU in short, is a private university in Musashino, Tokyo, Japan. The predecessor of the school was founded 1881, and it was chartered as a university in 1949. Since 1952 NVLU has been merged into the Nippon Medical School (日本医科大学 Nihon ika daigaku), although they maintain separate identities for the medical and veterinary schools.
