= Inokashira-kōen Station =

Railway station in Mitaka, Tokyo, Japan

Inokashira-kōen Station 井の頭公園駅

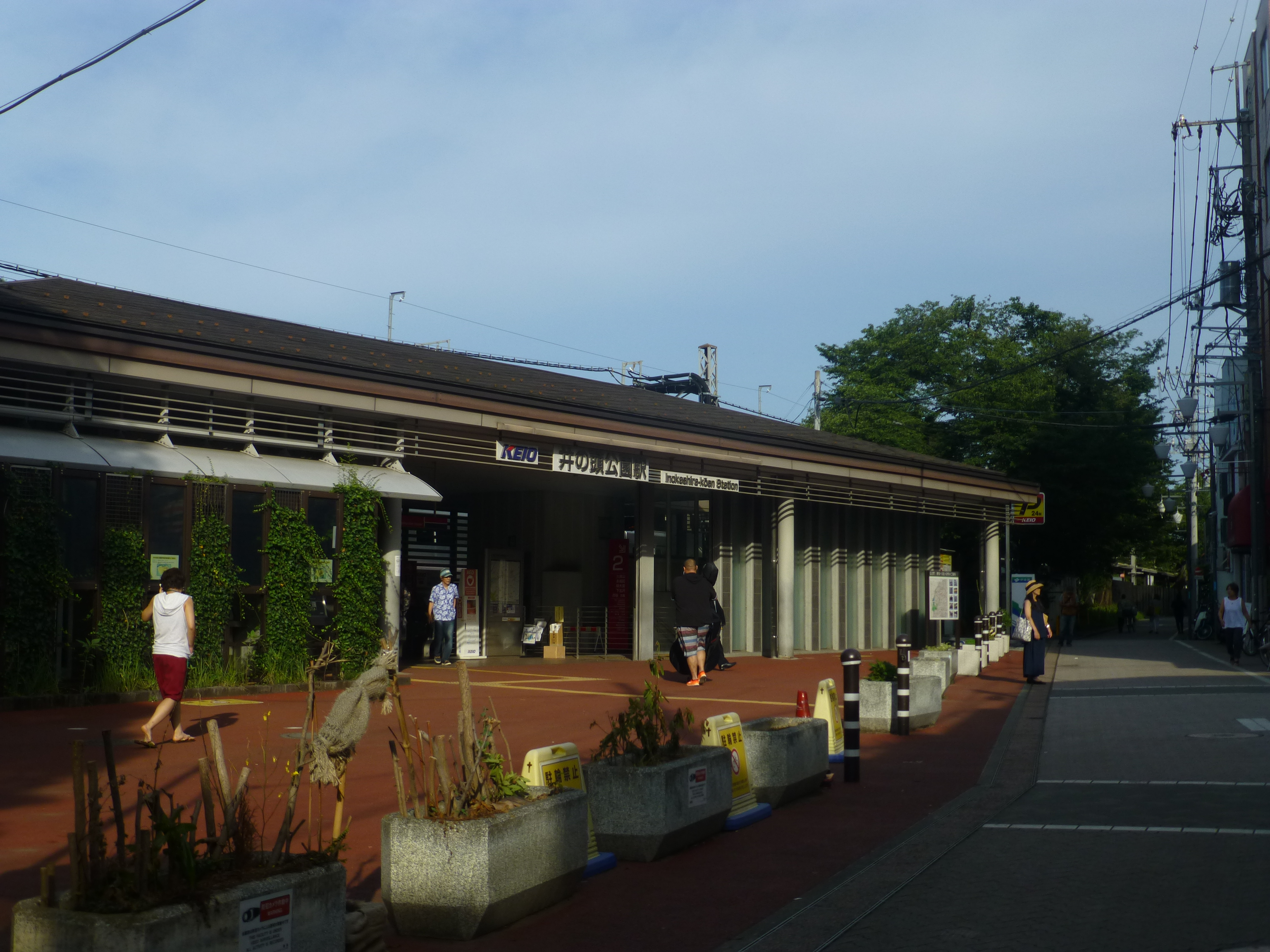
- Inokashira-koen Station, July 2016

General information
- Location: 3-35-12 Inogashira, Mitaka-shi, Tokyo 181-0001; Japan
- Coordinates: 35.6975°N 139.5827°E
- Operator: Keio Corporation
- Line: Keio Inokashira Line
- Distance: 12.1 km from Shibuya
- Platforms: 2 side platforms

Other information
- Station code: IN16
- Website: Official website

History
- Opened: August 1, 1933; 93 years ago

Passengers
- FY 2019: 6,814

Services
Preceding station	Keio Corporation	Following station
Kichijōji Terminus	Inokashira Line Local	Mitakadai towards Shibuya
Location
- Location within Tokyo Location within Japan

Inokashira-kōen Station (井の頭公園駅, Inokashira-kōen-eki) is a passenger railway station located in the city of Mitaka, Tokyo, Japan, operated by the private railway operator Keio Corporation.

== Lines ==
Inokashira-kōen Station is served by the 12.7 km Keio Inokashira Line from Shibuya in Tokyo to Kichijōji. Located between Mitakadai and Kichijōji, it is 12.1 km from the Shibuya terminus.

== Service pattern ==
Only all-stations "Local" services stop at this station. During the daytime, there are eight services per hour in either direction.

== Station layout ==
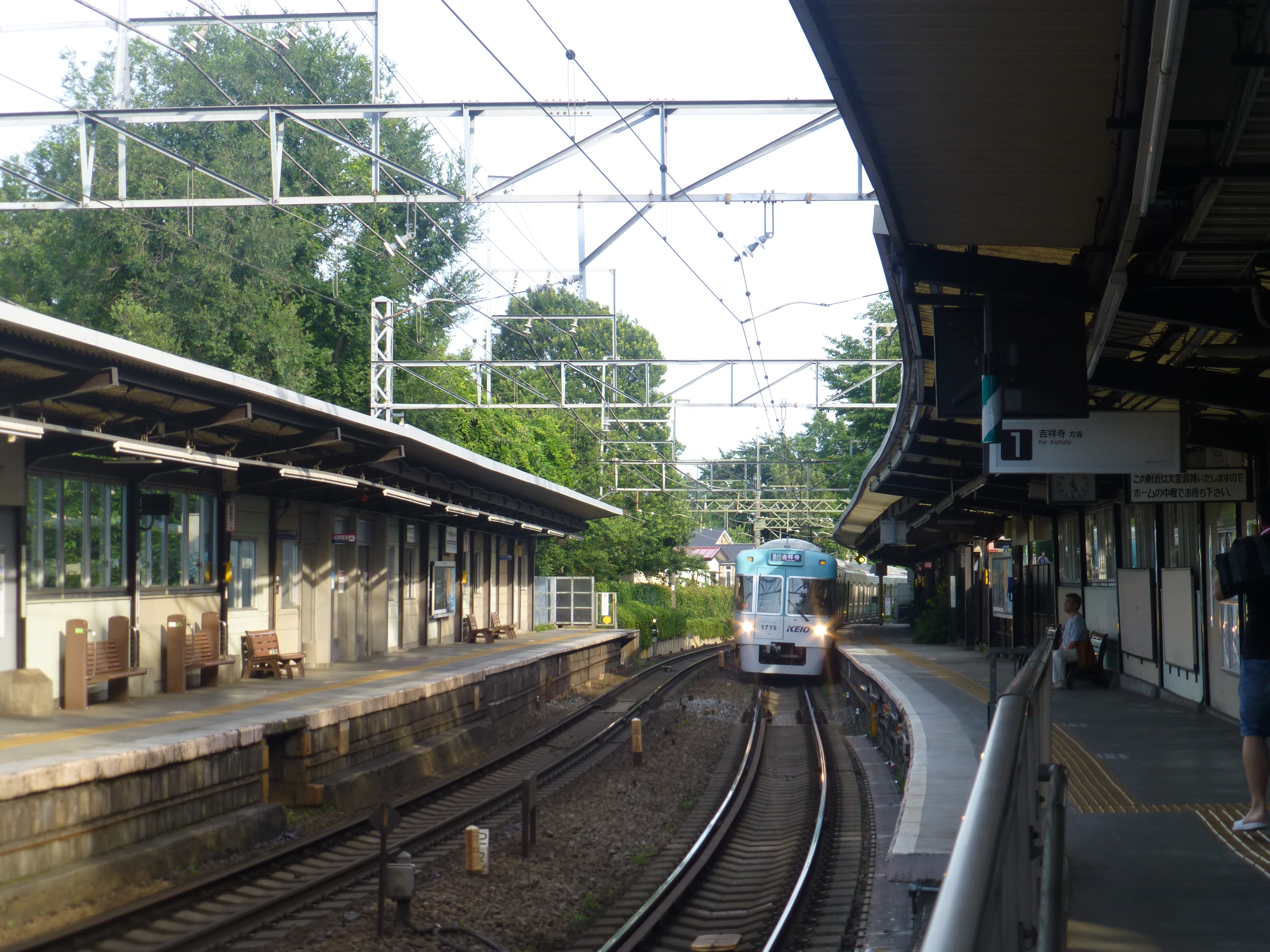
View of the platforms, July 2016

The station has two opposing ground-level side platforms serving two tracks. The station building is located on the side of the Kichijoji-bound platform, and connected to the Shibuya-bound platform by an underground passageway.

In July 2006, the station underwent renovations to provide universal accessibility, including installation of elevators, toilets, and renovations of the station office.

=== Platforms ===
1	Keio Inokashira Line	for Kichijōji
2	Keio Inokashira Line	for Shimo-Kitazawa, Meidaimae, and Shibuya

== History ==
The station opened on 1 August 1933.

From 22 February 2013, station numbering was introduced on Keio lines, with Inokashira-kōen Station becoming "IN16".

== Passenger statistics ==
In fiscal 2019, the station was used by an average of 6,814 passengers daily.

The passenger figures for previous years are as shown below.

Fiscal year	Daily average
2005	5,487
2010	6,682
2015	6,806

== Surrounding area ==
The station is close to Inokashira Park, the source of the Kanda River and is a favorite spot for springtime hanami, or cherry-blossom viewing.

It is situated in a quiet residential area with only a handful of shops and restaurants, but Kichijōji is only a 10-minute walk away (600 m).
