= Musashino Municipal Athletic Stadium =

Multi-use stadium in Musashino, Tokyo, Japan

Musashino Athletic Stadium
- The Musashs
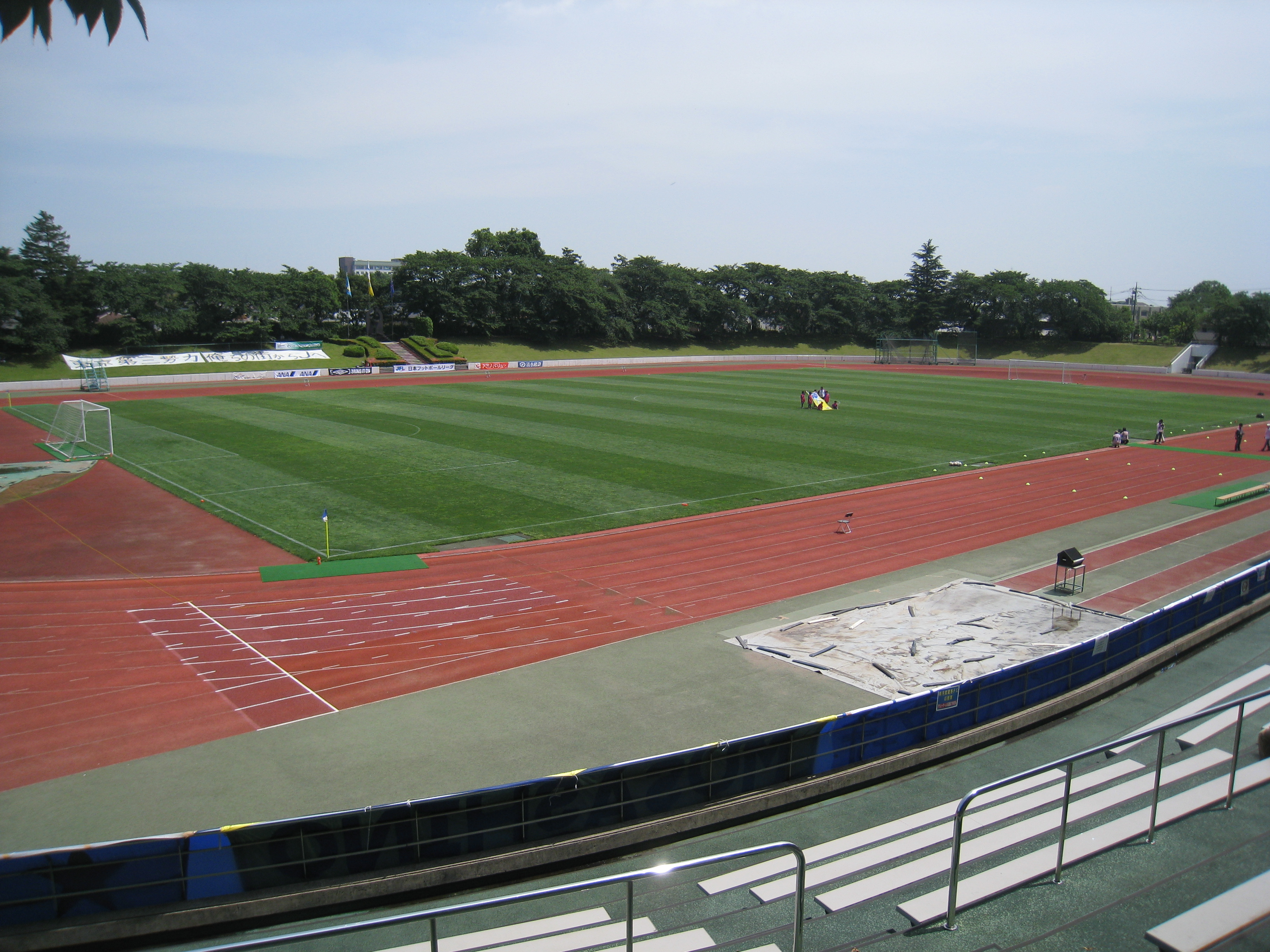
- Interactive map of Musashino Athletic Stadium
- Location: Musashino, Tokyo, Japan
- Coordinates: 35°43′03″N 139°34′06″E
- Owner: Musashino City
- Capacity: 5,000
- Surface: Grass
- Field size: 105 x 64 m

Construction
- Opened: 1989

Tenants
- Tokyo Musashino United FC, FC Tokyo

Musashino Municipal Athletic Stadium (市立武蔵野陸上競技場, Shiritsu Musashino Rikujō Kyōgijō) is a multi-use stadium in Musashino, Tokyo, Japan. It is currently used mostly for football matches and athletics events. This stadium's capacity is 5,000 people.

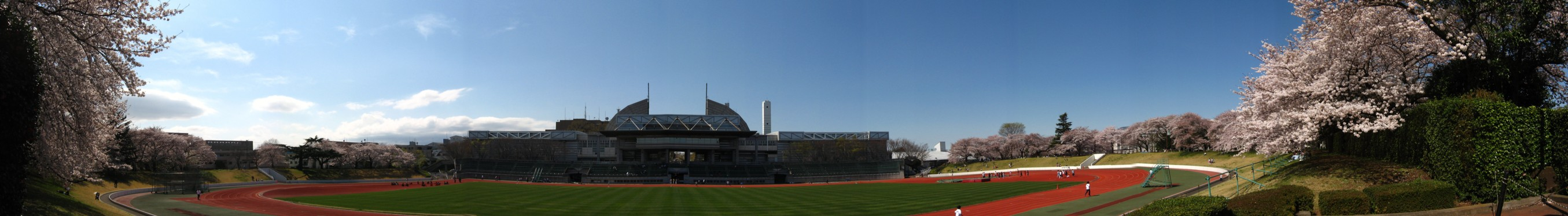
Panorama view of Musashino Municipal Athletic Stadium
