= Inokashira Park =

Park in Tokyo, Japan

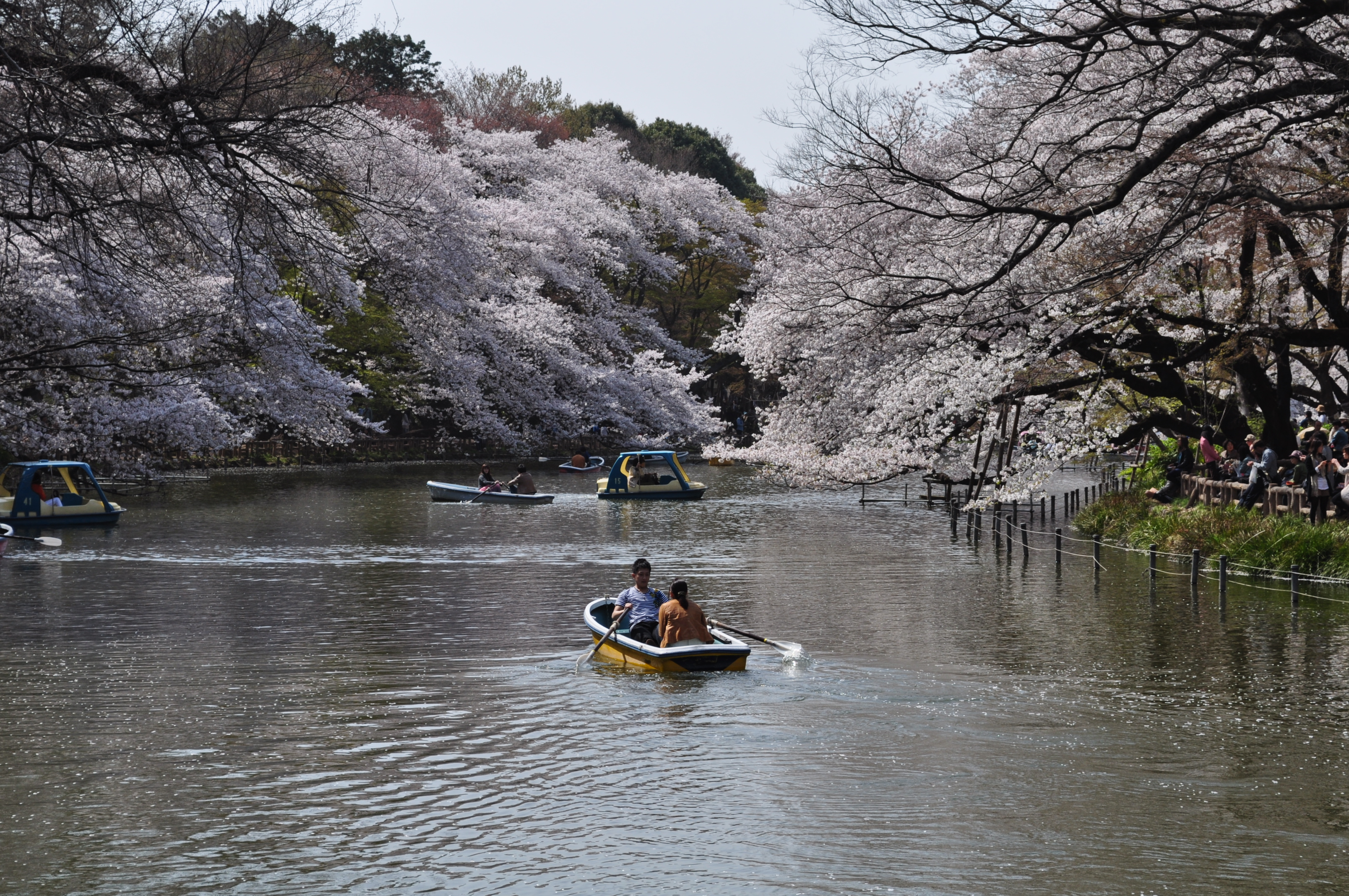
- Park during cherry blossom season
- Interactive map of Inokashira Park
- Location: Musashino and Mitaka, Tokyo, Japan
- Coordinates: 35°42′03″N 139°34′27″E
- Area: 385,844.02 square metres (95.34413 acres)
- Created: May 1, 1917
- Public transit: Kichijōji Station

Inokashira Park (井の頭恩賜公園, Inokashira Onshi Kōen) is a park which straddles Musashino and Mitaka in western Tokyo, Japan. Inokashira Pond (井の頭池) and the Kanda River water source (神田上水, Kanda jōsui), established during the Edo period, are the primary sources of the Kanda River.

The land was given to Tokyo in 1913. On May 1, 1917, it opened under the name Inokashira Onshi Kōen (井の頭恩賜公園), which can be translated as, "Inokashira Imperial Grant Park". Thus the park was considered a gift from the Emperor to the general public.

== Data ==
- Date opened: May 1, 1917
- Area: 383,773 m2
- Address: Gotenyama 1-chōme, Kichijōji Minami-chō 1-chōme, Musashino city, Inokashira 3~5-chōme, Shimorenjaku 1-chōme, Mure 4-chome, Mitaka city, Tokyo
- Nearest stations: 5 min walk from Kichijōji (JR Chūō line), 1 min walk from Inokashira-kōen Station (Keiō Inokashira Line)
- Number of trees: Tall trees: 11,060 / shrubs: 12,800 / lawn: 10,000 m2
- Variety of plants: Cherry trees, cypresses, red pines, azaleas

== Geography ==
Inokashira Park encompasses Inokashira pond in its center. Inokashira Pond is a long, narrow pond, stretching from northwest to southeast, and split into two branches at the northwest end. From the southeast end, the Kanda River flows outward. A section of the stream is also within the bounds of the park. On the west side of the park is a thicket, in Gotenyama, and a small zoo. On the other side of Kichijoji Ave. is the Tokyo Metropolitan Government Bureau of Construction. On the southern side of the thicket, the Tamagawa Aqueduct flows toward the southeast, and further south is the “western park” area. Beside the downstream section of the Tamagawa Aqueduct is there is an “Eastern Garden,” which includes a small open area.

With regard to city boundaries, the Inokashira Pond section of the Kanda River in the park, Inokashira-kōen Station, and the West and East gardens are in Mitaka. The area of the park beginning just past the northern shore of Inokashira Pond is in Musashino. Near the park, less than 500 meters from Inokashira Pond is Kichijōji station, on the JR Chuo Line. Kichijōji Station has a Park Exit (公園口, kōen guchi) on its south side, facing toward the park. The path from the station toward the pond is lined with shops aimed at young people. In the southeast of the park is Inokashira-kōen Station, on the Keio Inokashira Line, which runs parallel to the Kanda River. The distance from the station to the pond is very short, and there are small paths and open spaces between them which visitors can wander through. It is said that, if you ride the boats on Inokashira Park's pond with a girlfriend, you will surely break up soon.

== Nature and the seasons ==
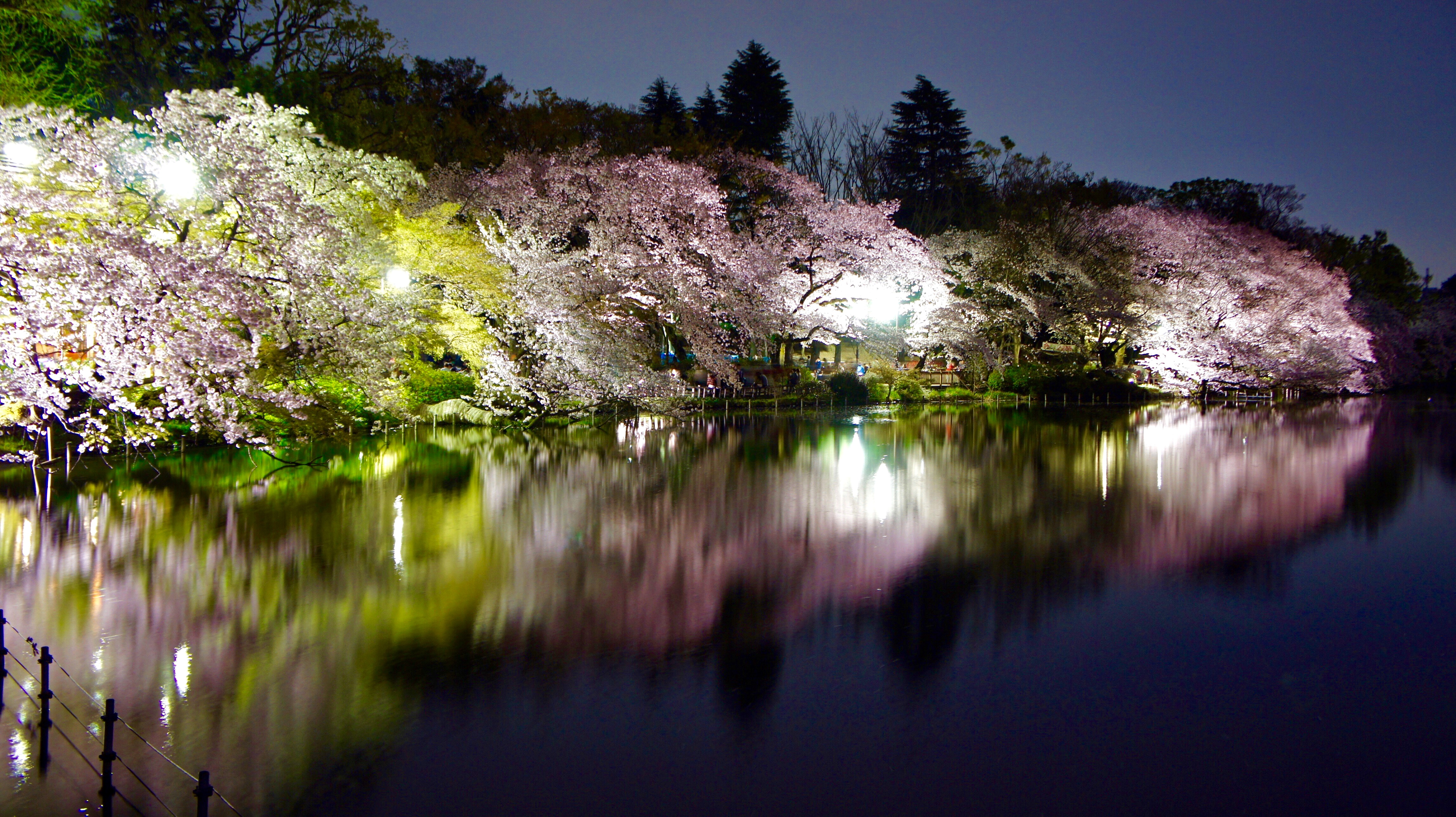
Cherry blossom illumination in Inokashira Park

Spring in Inokashira Park is the season of the blooming cherry trees that line the pond. Looking from the Nanai Bridge, which crosses the pond near the center, the branches of the cherry trees extending from the shore bloom so densely as to all but cover the surface of the pond. The pale color of the blossoms contrasts with the sky and water's surface. During the blooming period of cherry blossoms the park receives many visitors. In addition, on the west side of the park there are many flowers to be seen in the flowering plum grove before the blooming period of the cherry trees. On the north side of the plum grove, on the edge of the pond, there is a spring, but its flow is nowadays weak.

In summer one can enjoy the green of the trees that cover Gotenyama. In autumn the leaves of the many kinds of trees in the park change color, and the fallen leaves bury the walking paths. Winter in Inokashira Park is also lively. Many migrating birds come, and Inokashira Pond becomes their wintering place. Wild snakes can also be seen within the park.

== Attractions ==
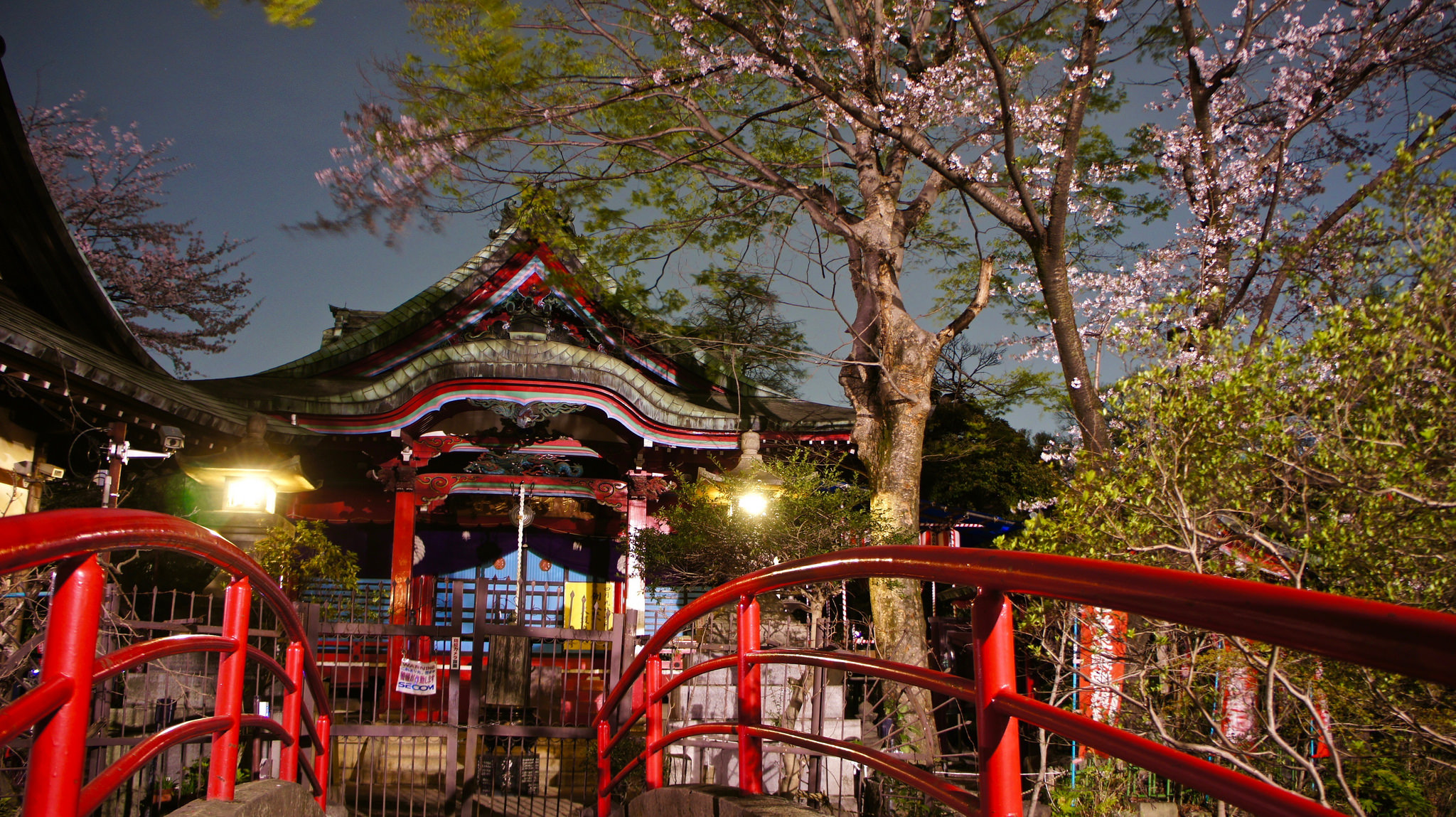
Inokashira Benzaiten

The park contains a small temple dedicated to Benzaiten. The park has a petting zoo and a small aquarium, and is a place where vendors, musicians, artists and street performers gather. The park is bustling with crowds who arrive to take in the lively environment on weekends and holidays, especially during the cherry blossom season when the entire park is overrun with visitors for hanami.

On the southwest end of Inokashira Park is the Ghibli Museum, a popular destination dedicated to the works of animation studio Studio Ghibli.

== Main events ==
As of 2010, the main annual events held at Inokashira Park are as follows.

- Kichijoji Music Festival – Park Concert (beginning in April every year). A Golden Week event. Acts such as brass bands and chorus groups perform.
- Kichijouji Anime Wonderland (held annually in October during consecutive holidays)
  - Exciting Forest Stage (森のわくわくステージ, Mori no wakuwaku suteeji). On an outdoor stage, singers and voice actors perform concerts and talk shows.
  - Forest Movie Theater (森の映画館, Mori no Eigakan). A screen is set up on the outdoor stage, and films are shown from the evening until the night of the festival.
  - Forest Excitement Bazaar (森のわくわくバザール, Mori no wakuwaku bazaaru). Sales booths. Various goods and souvenirs are sold beside the outdoor stage.

== Gallery ==
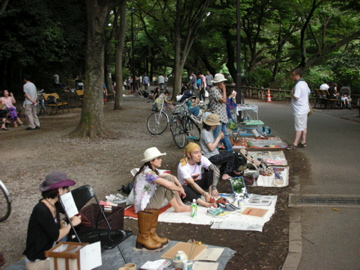
A Sunday afternoon at Inokashira Park

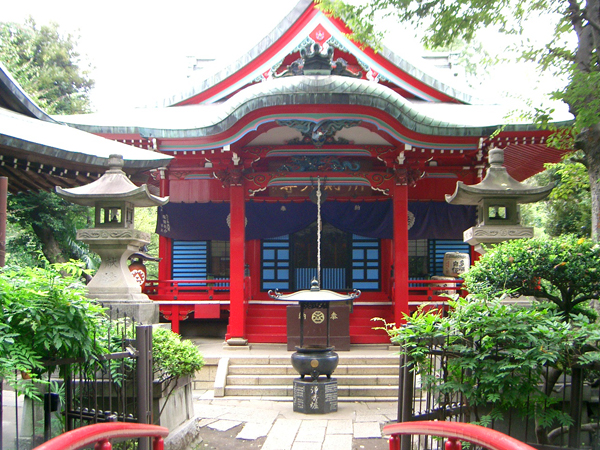
Temple dedicated to Benzaiten

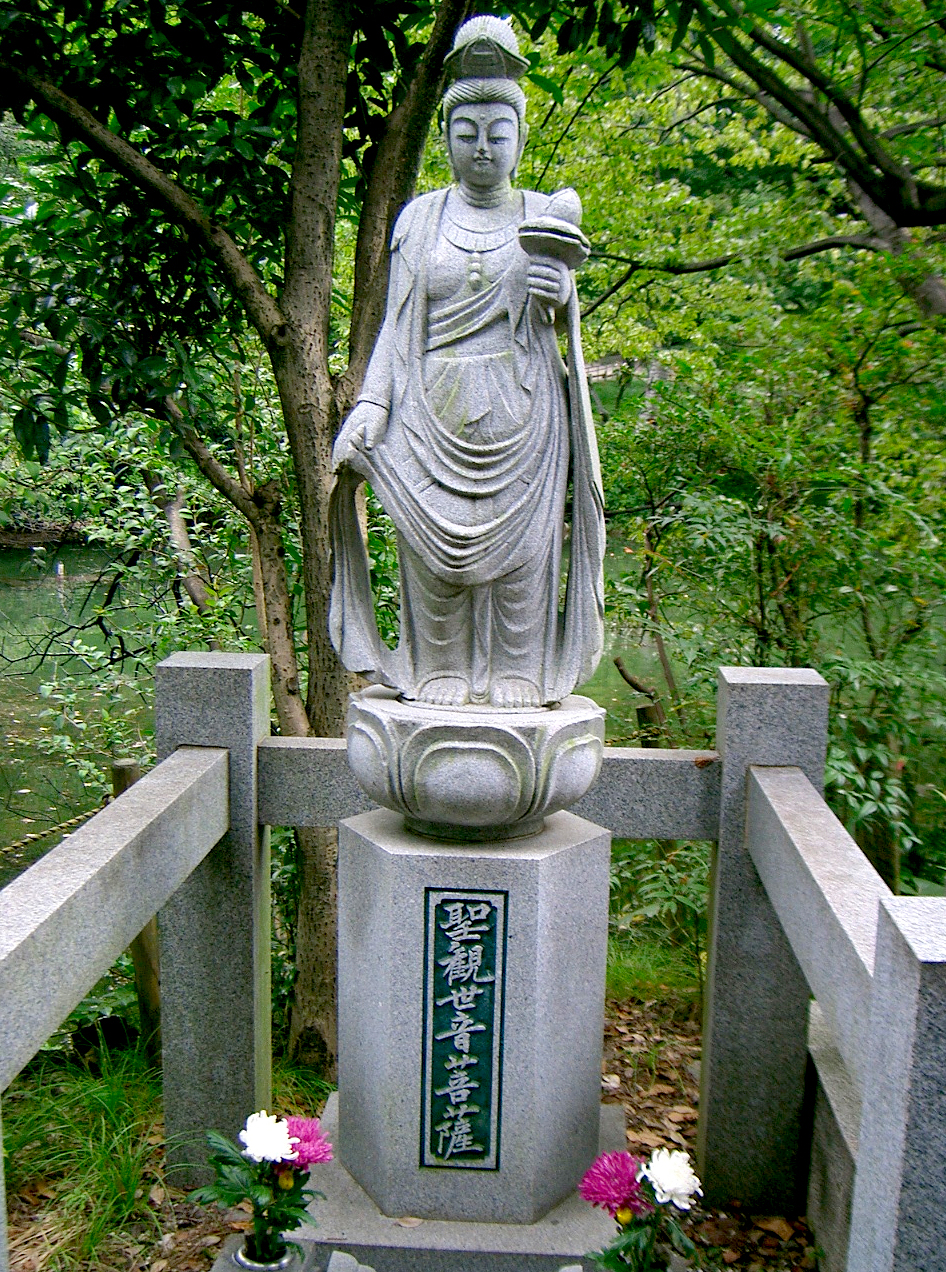
Kanzeon (観世音) statue located at Inokashira

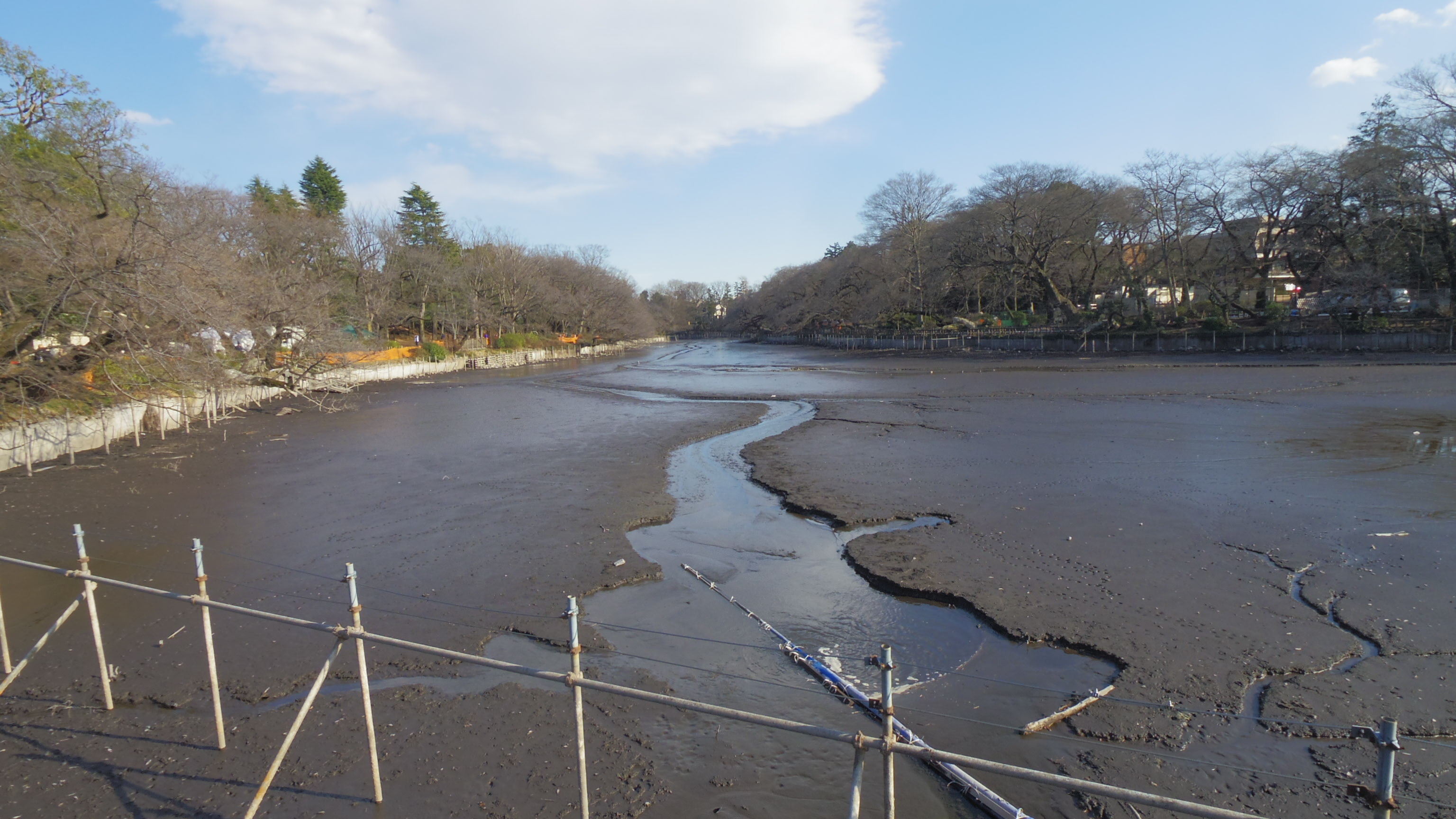
Inokashira Pond in 2016, temporarily drained of water for maintenance work

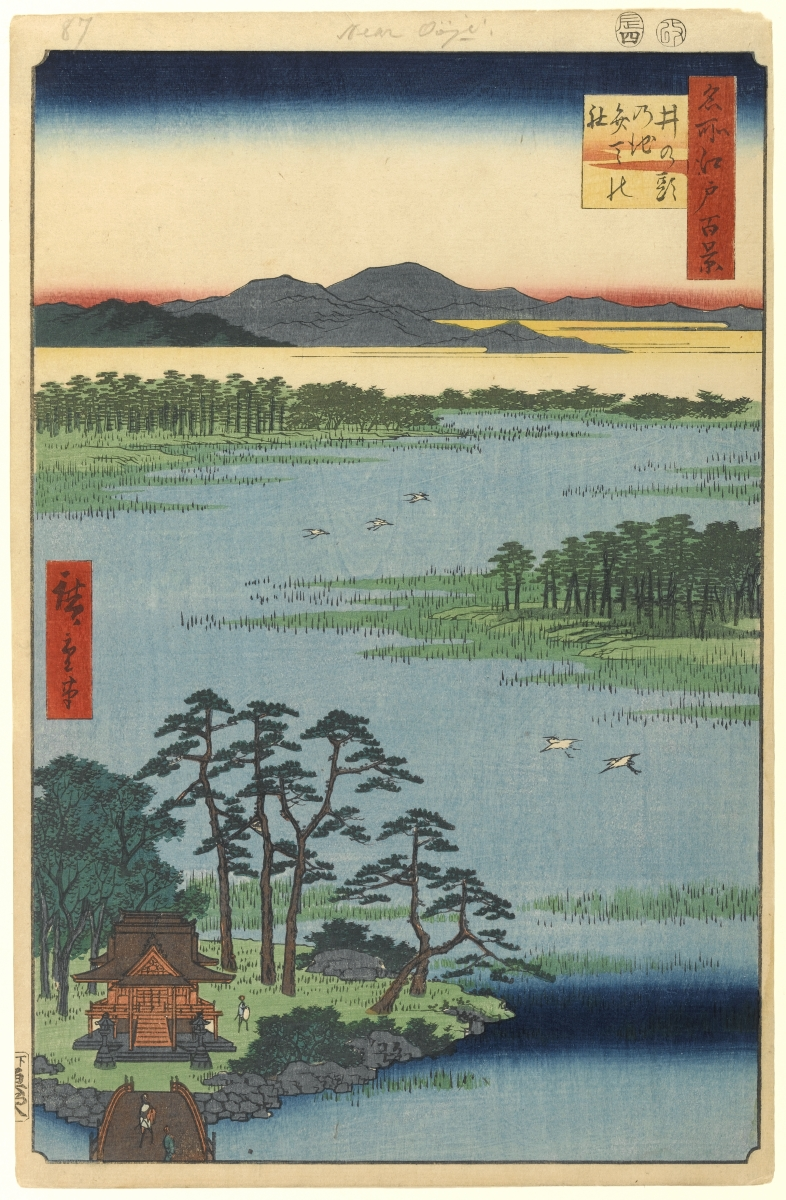
Hiroshige

== See also ==
- Inokashira Park dismemberment incident
