= Musashino, Tokyo =

Musashino 武蔵野市
- City
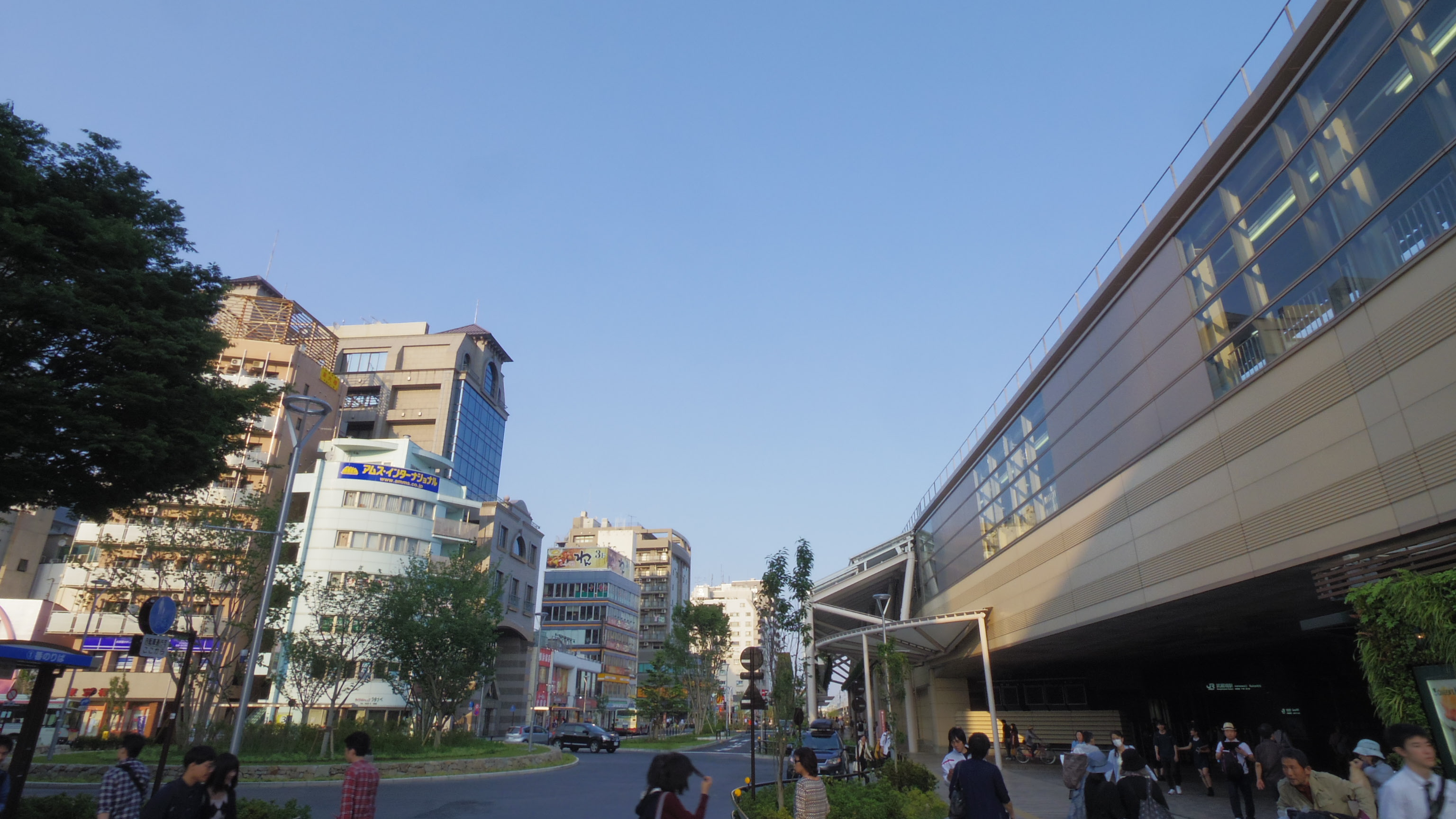
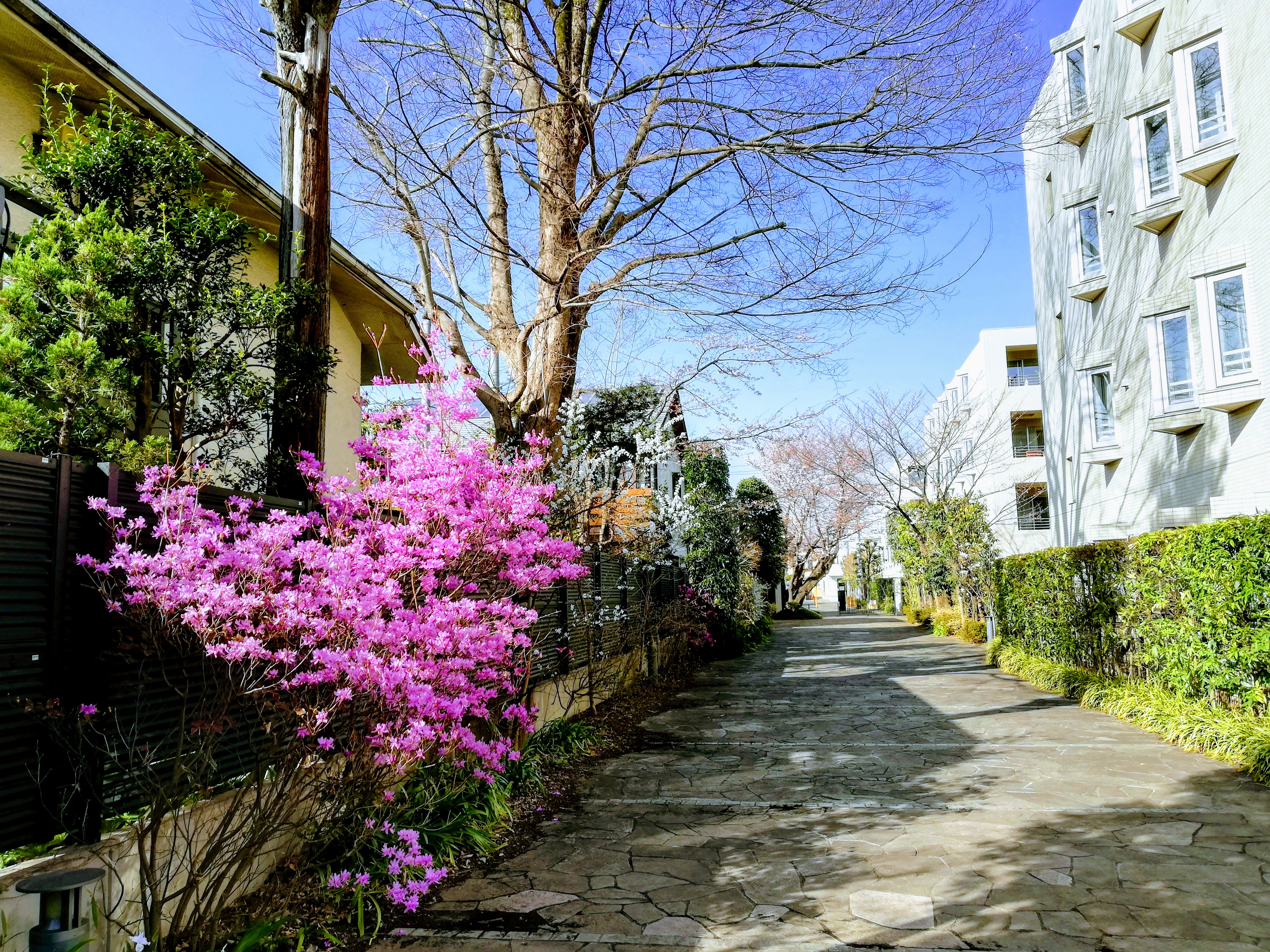
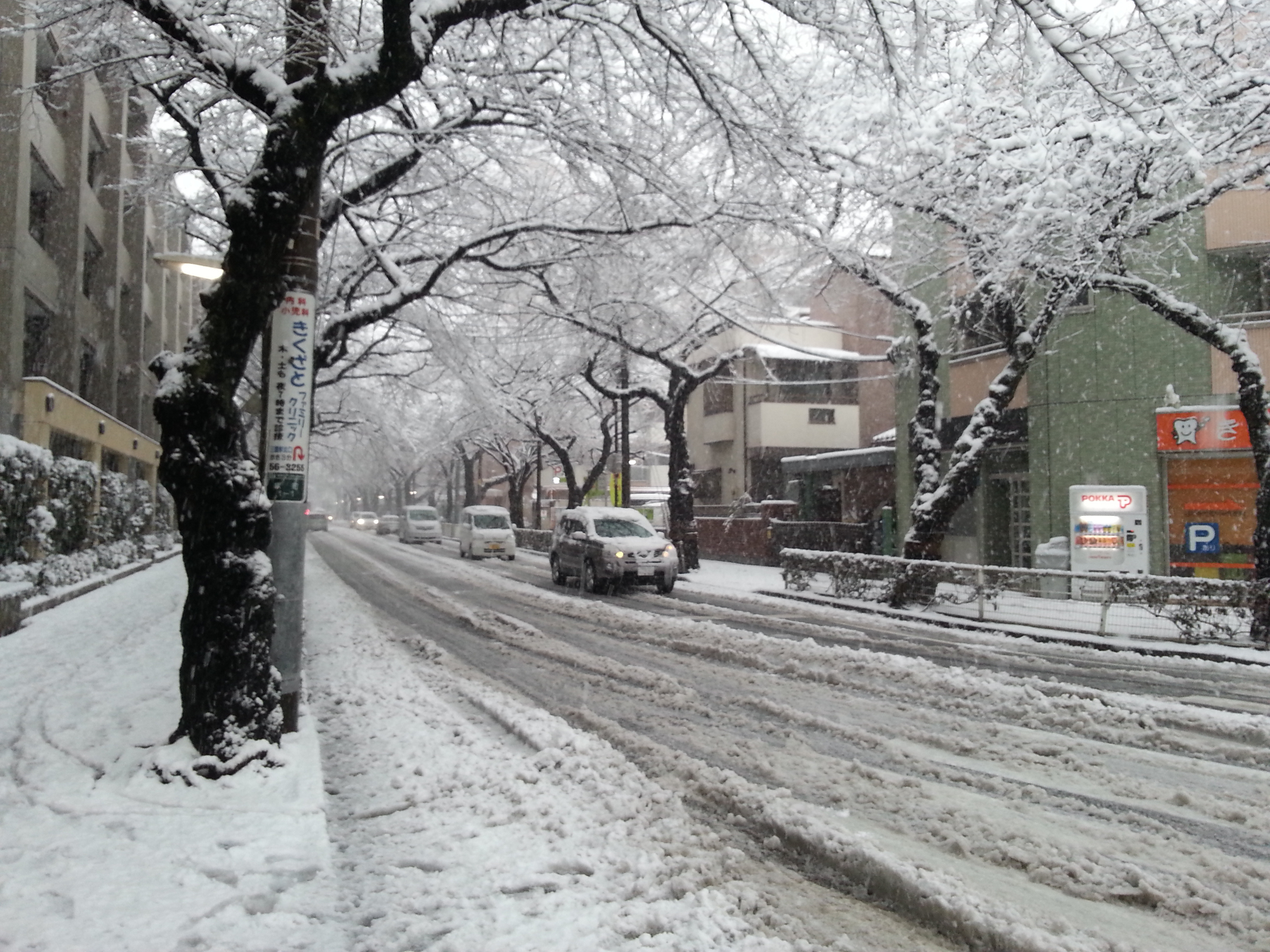
- Top to bottom: Musashi-Sakai Station, Kichijōji Minamicho, Itsukaichikaido, Musashino

- Flag Seal

- Location of Musashino in Tokyo

- Coordinates: 35°43′3.8″N 139°33′57.8″E
- Country: Japan
- Region: Kantō
- Prefecture: Tokyo

Government
  - Mayor: Yasuhiro Omino (小美濃安弘) (from December 2023)

Area
  - Total: 10.98 km^{2} (4.24 sq mi)

Population (February 2024)
  - Total: 147,754
  - Density: 13,460/km^{2} (34,850/sq mi)
- Time zone: UTC+9 (Japan Standard Time)
- Symbols
  - Tree: Magnolia kobus, Zelkova serrata, Cornus florida
  - Flower: Lespedeza, Lithospermum purpurocaeruleum, Orychophragmus, Azalea, Daphne odora, Narcissus, Hibiscus mutabilis, Ipomoea nil, Chrysanthemum
- Phone number: 0422-51-5131
- Address: 2-2-28 Midori-cho, Musashino-shi, Tokyo 180-8777
- Website: Official website

Musashino (武蔵野市, Musashino-shi; Japanese pronunciation: [mɯ̈̀.sä́.ɕí.nó̞(.ɕì)]) is a city located in the western portion of the Tokyo Metropolis, Japan. As of 1 February 2024, the city had an estimated population of 147,754 in 78,614 households, and a population density of 13,000 persons per km^{2}. The total area of the city is 10.98 square kilometres (4.24 sq mi). Based on the 2019 survey by SUUMO, the Kichijoji neighborhood of Musashino was the third most desirable place to live in central Japan.

Popular attractions in Musashino include Kichijōji; a residential and shopping neighborhood with malls such as Atre Kichijoji, recreational areas such as Inokashira Park, Musashino Chuo Park, Musashino Municipal Athletic Stadium and Musashino Sports Complex.

== Geography ==
Sun Road, Kichijōji

Musashino is located in the Musashino Terrace of central Tokyo Metropolis. It is bordered by the 23 Special Wards of Tokyo.

Musashino is composed of the following neighborhoods: Kichijoji Kitamachi, Kichijoji Higashi Cho, Kichijoji Honcho, Kichijoji Minamicho, Kyonan Cho, Gotenyama, Sakai, Sakurazuki, Sekimae, Nakacho, Nishikubo, Midoricho, and Yahata Cho.

Kichijōji includes the source of the Kanda River.

=== Surrounding municipalities ===
Tokyo Metropolis

- Koganei
- Mitaka
- Nerima
- Nishitōkyō
- Suginami

=== Climate ===
Musashino has a humid subtropical climate (Köppen Cfa) characterized by warm summers and cool winters with light to no snowfall. The average annual temperature in Musashino is 14.5 °C. The average annual rainfall is 1647 mm with September as the wettest month. The temperatures are highest on average in August, at around 26.0 °C, and lowest in January, at around 3.1 °C.

== Demographics ==
Per Japanese census data, the population of Musashino increased rapidly in the 1950s and 1960s, but has remained relatively constant over the past 50 years.

Historical population
| Year | Pop. | ±% |
|---|---|---|
| 1920 | 4,931 | — |
| 1930 | 17,229 | +249.4% |
| 1940 | 41,767 | +142.4% |
| 1950 | 73,149 | +75.1% |
| 1960 | 120,337 | +64.5% |
| 1970 | 136,959 | +13.8% |
| 1980 | 136,910 | −0.0% |
| 1990 | 139,077 | +1.6% |
| 2000 | 135,746 | −2.4% |
| 2010 | 138,734 | +2.2% |
| 2020 | 150,149 | +8.2% |

== History ==
The area of present-day Musashino was part of ancient Musashi Province. In the post-Meiji Restoration cadastral reform of July 22, 1878, the area became part of Kitatama District in Kanagawa Prefecture. The village of Musashino was created on April 1, 1889, with the establishment of modern municipalities law. Kitatama District was transferred to the administrative control of Tokyo Metropolis on April 1, 1893. Musashino was elevated to town status in 1928. Nakajima Aircraft Company had an aircraft engine plant in Musashino, which became a target for American bombers in World War II. Musashino was elevated to city status on November 3, 1947.

== Government ==
Musashino has a mayor-council form of government with a directly elected mayor and a unicameral city council of 26 members. Musashino contributes one member to the Tokyo Metropolitan Assembly. In terms of national politics, the city is part of Tokyo 18th district of the lower house of the Diet of Japan.

== Economy ==
Musashino is largely a commuter town for central Tokyo.

The anime and manga company Coamix has its headquarters in the Kichijōji neighborhood of Musashino. At one time Studio Ghibli was located in Kichijōji. Several other animation studios are located in Musashino, including J.C.Staff, Artland, Studio Ponoc, Production I.G, Bee Train, Wit Studio, Silver Link and Tatsunoko Production.

The electrical engineering and software company Yokogawa Electric has its headquarters in Nakacho, Musashino. Tokyo Musashino City FC, a football (soccer) club, is also located there.

== Education ==
=== Universities and colleges ===
- Asia University
- Japanese Red Cross College of Nursing
- Nippon Veterinary and Life Science University
- Seikei University

=== Primary and secondary schools ===
- Musashino has 12 public elementary schools and six public middle schools operated by the Musashino city government. There are also three private elementary schools, two private middle schools and two private combined middle/high schools.
- The city has two public high schools operated by the Tokyo Metropolitan Government Board of Education.

Metropolitan secondary and high schools:

- Tokyo Metropolitan Musashi Senior High School & Junior High School
- Musashino Kita High School

Municipal junior high schools:

- No. 1 Junior High School (第一中学校)
- No. 2 Junior High School (第二中学校)
- No. 3 Junior High School (第三中学校)
- No. 4 Junior High School (第四中学校)
- No. 5 Junior High School (第五中学校)
- No. 6 Junior High School (第六中学校)

Municipal elementary schools:

- No. 1 Elementary School (第一小学校)
- No. 2 Elementary School (第二小学校)
- No. 3 Elementary School (第三小学校)
- No. 4 Elementary School (第四小学校)
- No. 5 Elementary School (第五小学校)
- Honjuku Elementary School
- Inokashira Elementary School
- Kyonan Elementary School
- Onoden Elementary School
- Sakurano Elementary School
- Sekimae Minami Elementary School
- Senkawa Elementary School

Private schools:

- Fujimura Girls' Junior and Senior High School
- Kichijo Girls' School (junior and senior high school)
- Seikei Junior and Senior High School
- Shotoku Gakuen Junior and Senior High School

=== International schools ===
- Little Angels International School (now Musashi International School Tokyo), a private international school, previously had a campus in Kichijōji, Musashino.

== Transportation ==
=== Railways ===
JR East – Chūō Line (Rapid)

- Kichijōji
- Mitaka (northern part of the station is located in Nakacho, Musashino)
- Musashi-Sakai

Keio Corporation - Keio Inokashira Line

- Kichijōji

- Seibu Tamagawa Line

- Musashi-Sakai

=== Highways ===
- Musashino is not served by any national highways or expressways

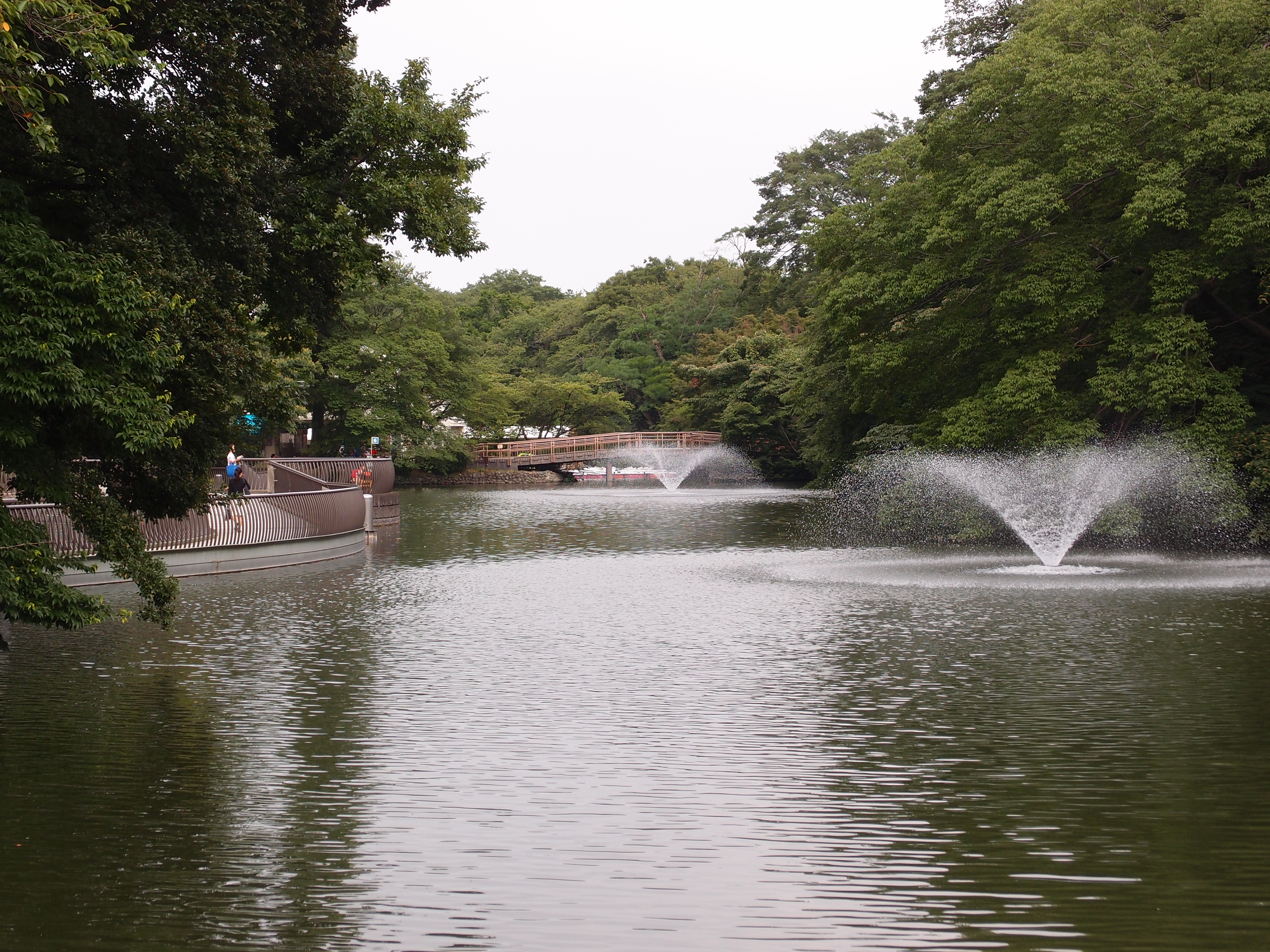
Inokashira Park

== Local attractions ==
- Inokashira Park
- Musashino Central Park
- Musashino Municipal Athletic Stadium
- Musashino Sports Complex

== Sister cities ==
- Chungju, Chungcheongbuk-do, South Korea
- Gangdong District, Seoul, South Korea
- Brașov, Romania
- Khabarovsk, Khabarovsk Krai, Russia
- Lubbock, Texas, United States

== Musashino in popular culture ==
- Satoshi Kon's anime series Paranoia Agent and Oyuki Konno's shōjo novel series Maria-sama ga Miteru take place in Musashino.
- Shōhei Ōoka's 1951 novel A Wife in Musashino (Musashino Fujin) is a drama in which a moral and stoic woman, trapped in a loveless marriage with a selfish and morally decadent man, becomes implicated against her will in what looks like an affair with her younger cousin. The story ends tragically as she is let down by him as well as by her husband. Kenji Mizoguchi made the story into a film in 1951, starring Kinuyo Tanaka and Masayuki Mori.
- Innocent Grey's 2007 visual novel Kara no Shoujo features many scenes set in Musashino in 1956. Inokashira Park in particular serves as a pivotal setting for much of the story.
- In the Yokohama Kaidashi Kikou manga by Hitoshi Ashinano, Musashino is the "former capital of the East" in a post-apocalyptic Japan in which the ocean level continually rises, implying Tokyo itself had been submerged many years before it.
- In the anime Shirobako the animation studio is named Musashino Animation.
- In the manga series Great Teacher Onizuka, Onizuka lives in Musashino and his first job is at Musashino Public High School. He later gets a job at a private school in Kichijōji.
