= Shin-Sayama Station =

Railway station in Sayama, Saitama Prefecture, Japan

SS27 Shin-Sayama Station 新狭山駅
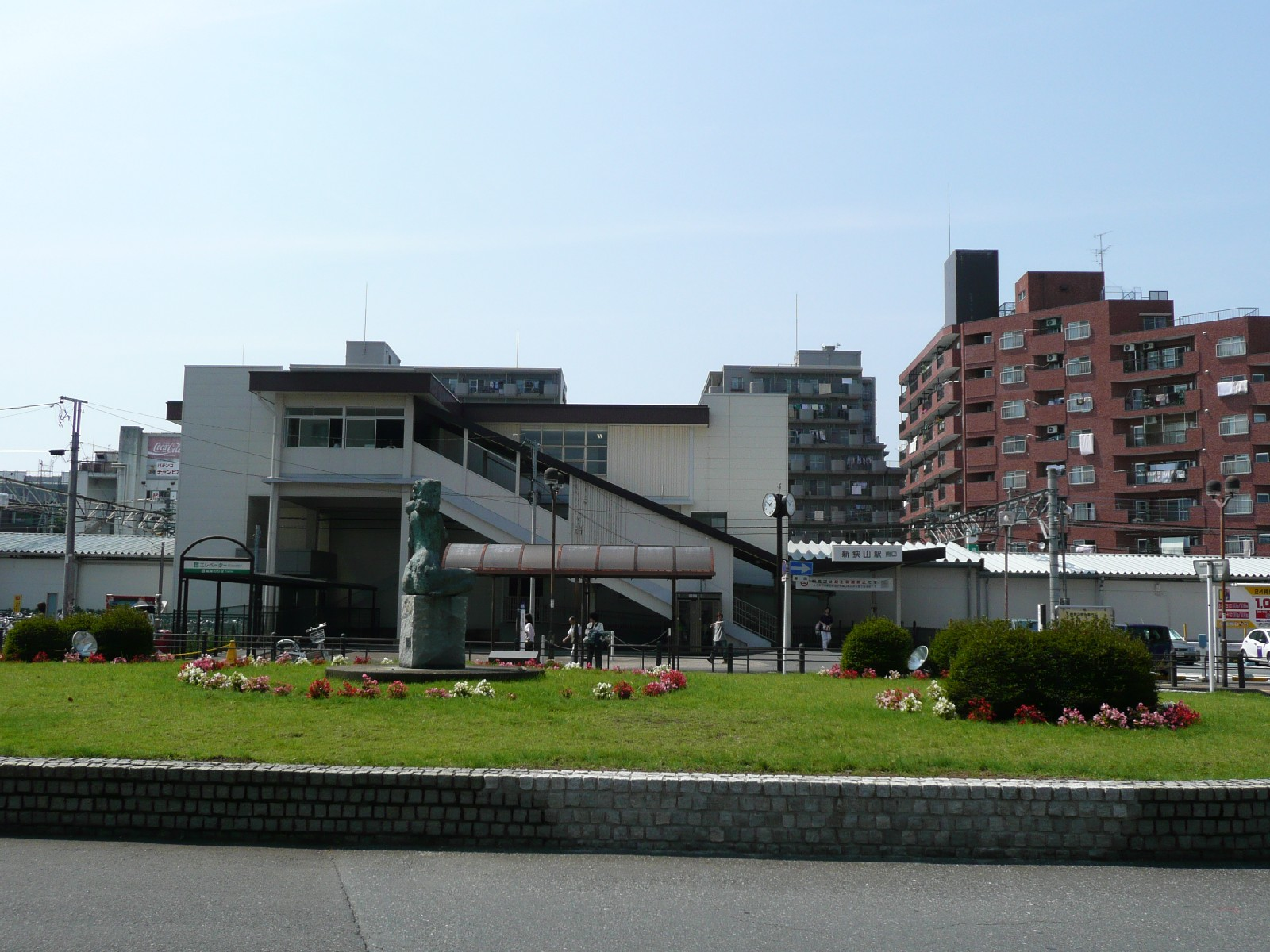
- Shin-Sayama Station, south side, July 2008

General information
- Location: 3-12-1 Shin-Sayama, Sayama-shi, Saitama-ken 350–1331; Japan
- Coordinates: 35°52′27″N 139°26′00″E
- Operator: Seibu Railway
- Line: Seibu Shinjuku Line
- Distance: 41.3 km from Seibu-Shinjuku
- Platforms: 2 side platforms

Other information
- Station code: SS27
- Website: Official website

History
- Opened: 15 November 1964

Passengers
- FY2019: 20,559 (Daily)

Services
Preceding station	Seibu Railway	Following station
Minami-Ōtsuka SS28 towards Hon-Kawagoe	Shinjuku Line Rapid Express	Sayamashi One-way operation
Minami-Ōtsuka SS28 towards Hon-Kawagoe	Shinjuku Line Express Semi Express Local	Sayamashi SS26 towards Seibu-Shinjuku
Location
- Location within Saitama Prefecture Location within Japan

Shin-Sayama Station (新狭山駅, Shin-Sayama-eki) is a passenger railway station located in the city of Sayama, Saitama, Japan, operated by Seibu Railway.

== Lines ==
Shin-Sayama Station is served by the Seibu Shinjuku Line between Seibu Shinjuku Station in Tokyo and Hon-Kawagoe Station in Kawagoe, and is located 41.3 km from the Seibu Shinjuku terminus.

== Station layout ==
The station consists of two side platforms serving two tracks. The station building is elevated and located above and at a right angle to the platforms.

=== Platforms ===
1	Seibu Shinjuku Line	for Hon-Kawagoe
2	Seibu Shinjuku Line	for Tokorozawa, Takadanobaba, and Seibu-Shinjuku

== History ==
The station opened on 15 November 1964.

Station numbering was introduced on all Seibu Railway lines during fiscal 2012, with Shin-Sayama Station becoming "SS27".

== Passenger statistics ==
In fiscal 2019, the station was the 52nd busiest on the Seibu network with an average of 20,559 passengers daily.

The passenger figures for previous years are as shown below.

Fiscal year	Daily average
2000	19,246
2005	20,929
2010	21,749
2015	21,434

== Surrounding area ==
- Bunri University of Hospitality
- National Route 16
