= Iriso Station =

Railway station in Sayama, Saitama Prefecture, Japan

SS25 Iriso Station 入曽駅
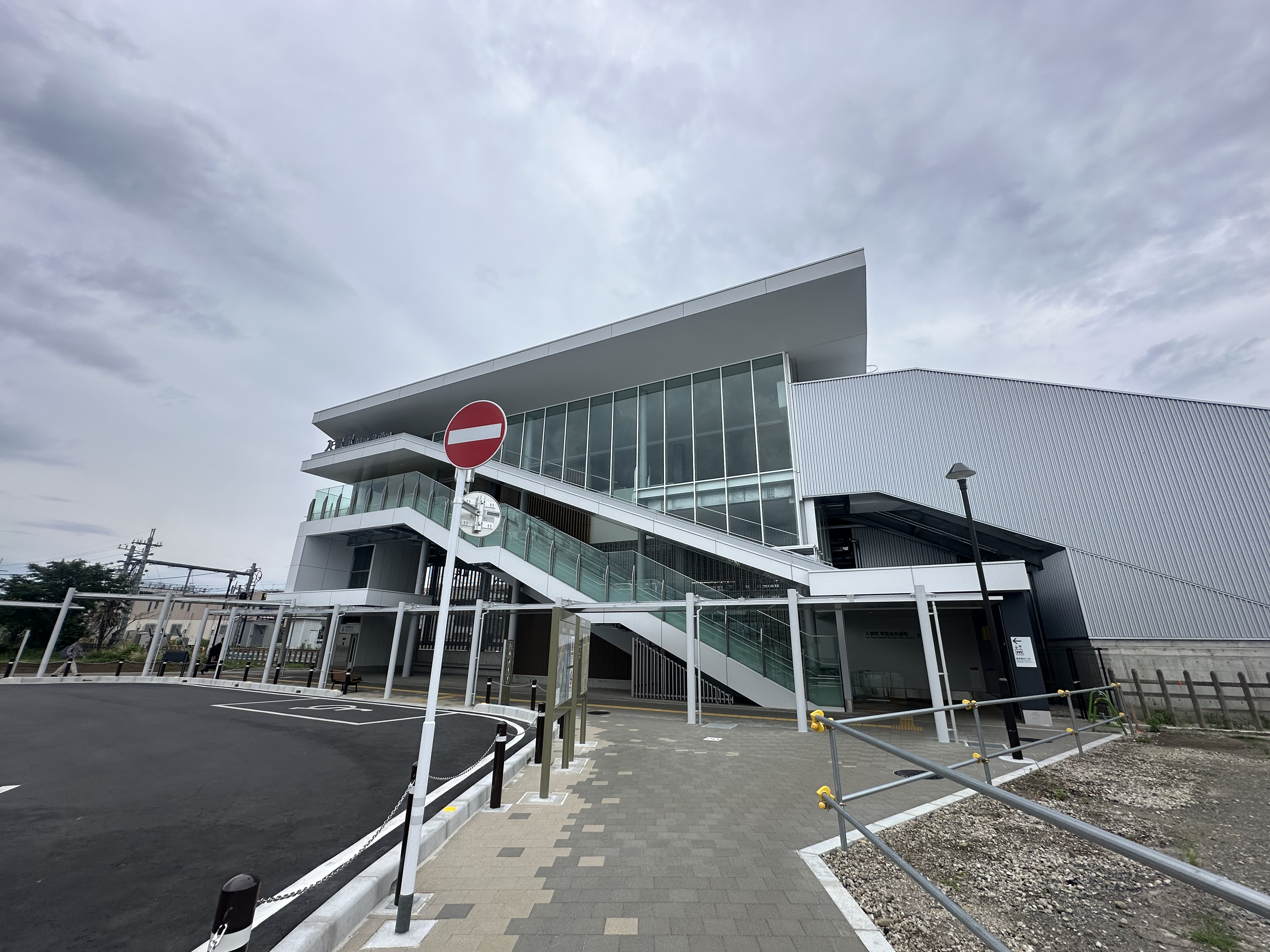
- West entrance, May 2025

General information
- Location: Minami-Iriso, Sayama-shi, Saitama-ken 350-1316; Japan
- Coordinates: 35°49′56″N 139°25′39″E
- Operator: Seibu Railway
- Line: Seibu Shinjuku Line
- Distance: 35.6 km from Seibu-Shinjuku
- Platforms: 2 side platforms

Other information
- Station code: SS25
- Website: Official website

History
- Opened: 21 March 1953

Passengers
- FY2019: 17,764 (Daily)

Services
Preceding station	Seibu Railway	Following station
Sayamashi SS26 towards Hon-Kawagoe	Shinjuku Line Rapid Express	Shin-Tokorozawa One-way operation
Sayamashi SS26 towards Hon-Kawagoe	Shinjuku Line Express Semi Express Local	Shin-Tokorozawa SS24 towards Seibu-Shinjuku
Location
- Location within Saitama Prefecture Location within Japan

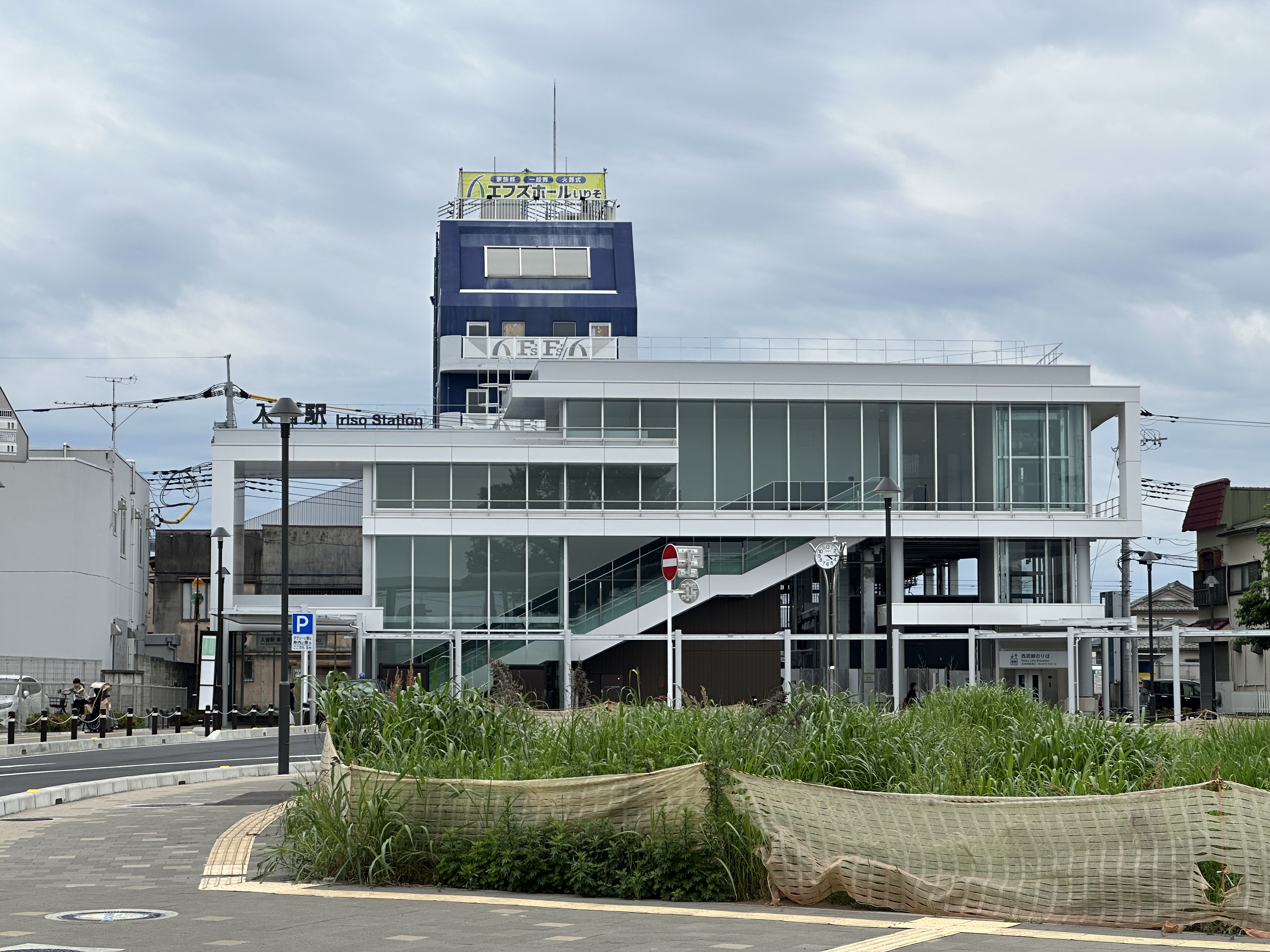
East exit, 2025

Iriso Station (入曽駅, Iriso-eki) is a passenger railway station located in the city of Sayama, Saitama, Japan, operated by the private railway operator Seibu Railway.

== Lines ==
Iriso Station is served by the 47.5 km Seibu Shinjuku Line from Seibu-Shinjuku in Tokyo to Hon-Kawagoe in Saitama Prefecture.

== Station layout ==
This station consists of two opposed side platforms serving two tracks, connected to each other by a footbridge.

=== Platforms ===
1	Seibu Shinjuku Line	for Tokorozawa, Takadanobaba, and Seibu-Shinjuku
2	Seibu Shinjuku Line	for Hon-Kawagoe

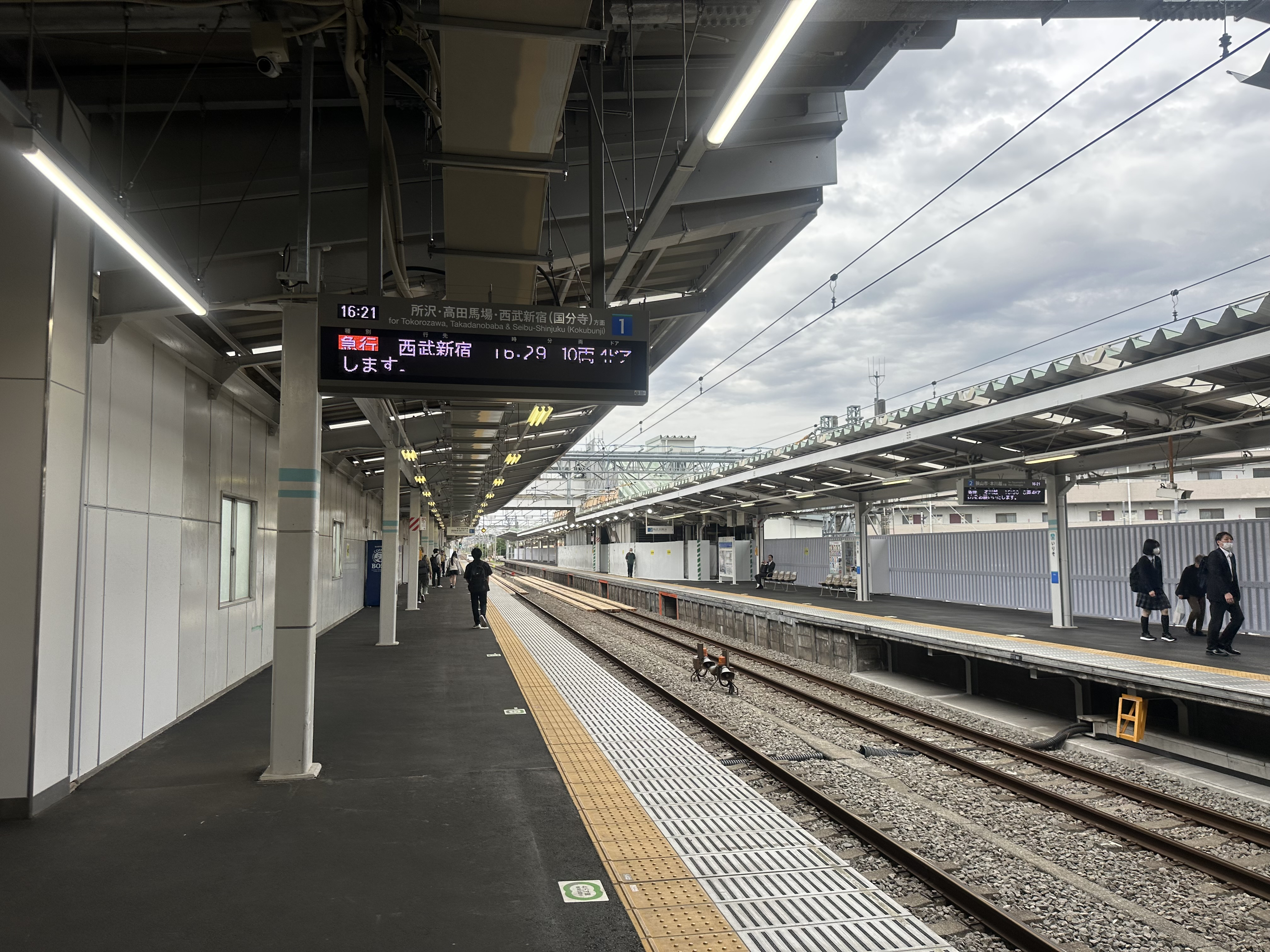
Platforms

== History ==
Iriso Station opened on 21 March 1953.

Station numbering was introduced on all Seibu Railway lines during fiscal 2012, with Iriso Station becoming "SS25".

== Passenger statistics ==
In fiscal 2019, the station was the 56th busiest on the Seibu network with an average of 17,764 passengers daily.

The passenger figures for previous years are as shown below.

Fiscal year	Daily average
2000	23,641
2005	10,654
2010	19,507
2015	18,378

== Surrounding area ==
- Iriso Post Office
- Minami-Iriso rail yard
