= Shin-Tokorozawa Station =

Railway station in Tokorozawa, Saitama Prefecture, Japan

SS24 Shin-Tokorozawa Station 新所沢駅
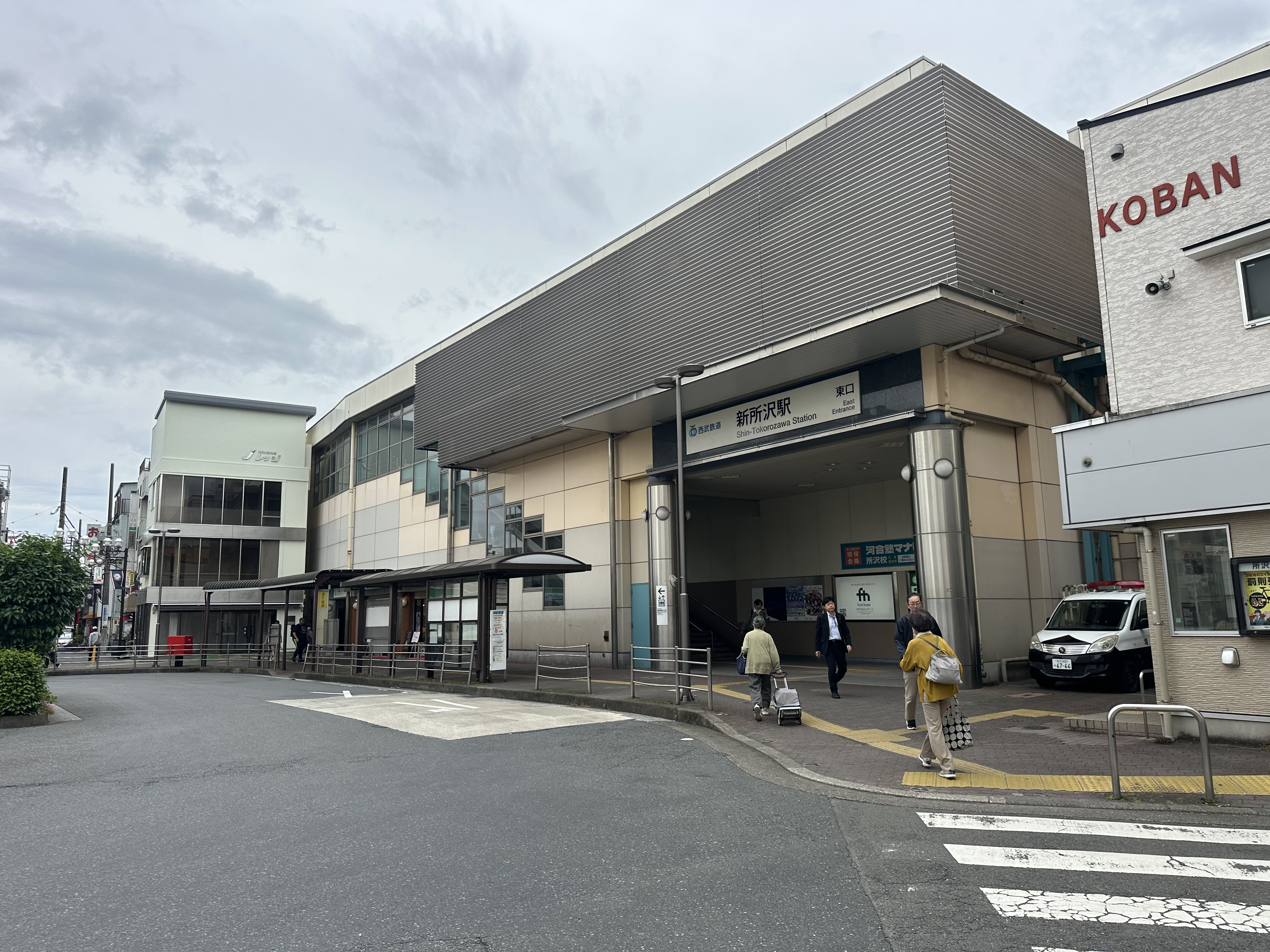
- East entrance, November 2025

General information
- Location: 1-21-25 Midori-chō, Tokorozawa-shi, Saitama-ken 359-1111; Japan
- Coordinates: 35°48′24.20″N 139°27′20.80″E
- Operator: Seibu Railway
- Line: Seibu Shinjuku Line
- Distance: 31.7 km from Seibu Shinjuku
- Platforms: 2 island platforms
- Tracks: 4
- Connections: Bus terminal

Other information
- Station code: SS24
- Website: Official website

History
- Opened: 11 June 1951
- Former names: Kita-Tokorozawa (until 1959)

Passengers
- FY2019: 54,822 daily

Services
Preceding station	Seibu Railway	Following station
Iriso SS25 towards Hon-Kawagoe	Shinjuku Line Rapid Express	Tokorozawa One-way operation
Sayamashi One-way operation	Shinjuku Line Commuter Express	Tokorozawa SS22 towards Seibu-Shinjuku
Iriso SS25 towards Hon-Kawagoe	Shinjuku Line Express Semi Express Local	Kōkū-kōen SS23 towards Seibu-Shinjuku
Location
- Location within Saitama Prefecture Location within Japan

Shin-Tokorozawa Station (新所沢駅, Shin-Tokorozawa-eki) is a passenger railway station located in the city of Tokorozawa, Saitama, Japan, operated by the private railway operator Seibu Railway.

== Lines ==
Shin-Tokorozawa Station is served by the 47.5 km Seibu Shinjuku Line from Seibu Shinjuku in Tokyo to Hon-Kawagoe in Saitama Prefecture. Located between Kōkū-kōen and Iriso, it lies 31.7 km from the Seibu Shinjuku terminus. All trains except Limited express Koedo services stop at Shin-Tokorozawa Station.

== Station layout ==
Shin-Tokorozawa Station has two entrances, east and west, with ticket vending on the second floor level of the elevated station building.

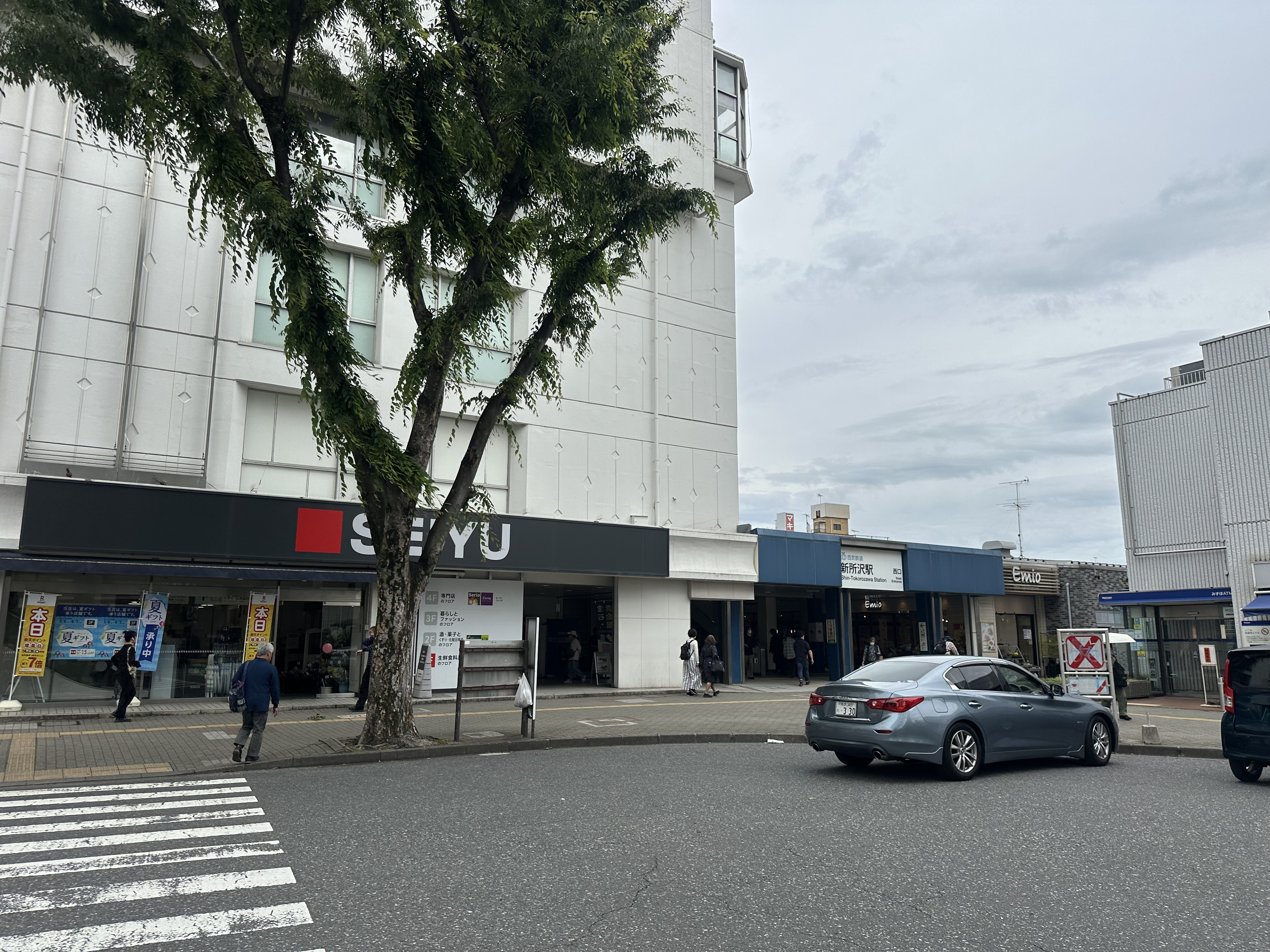
West entrance, May 2025

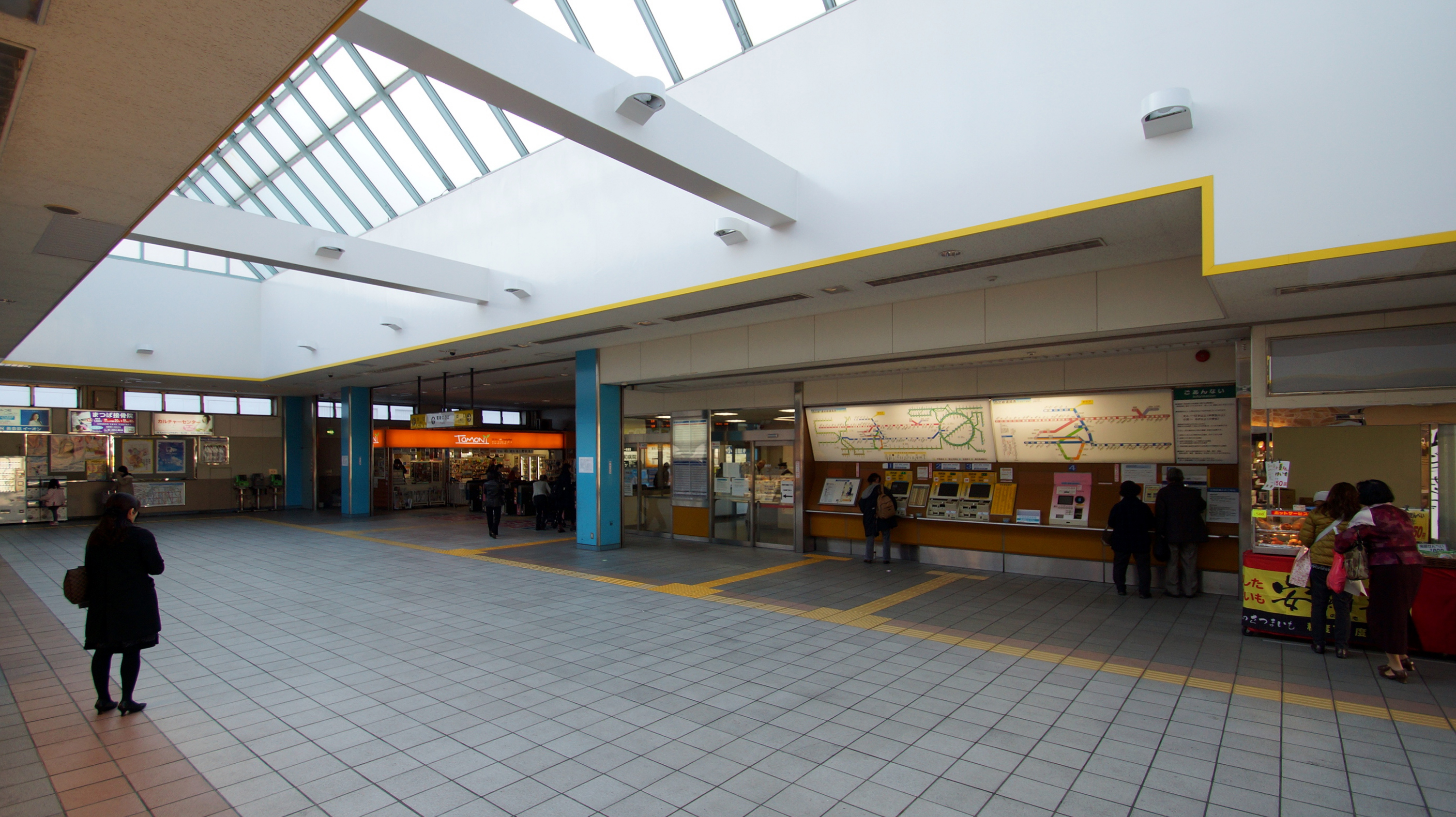
Ticket vending machines, November 2013

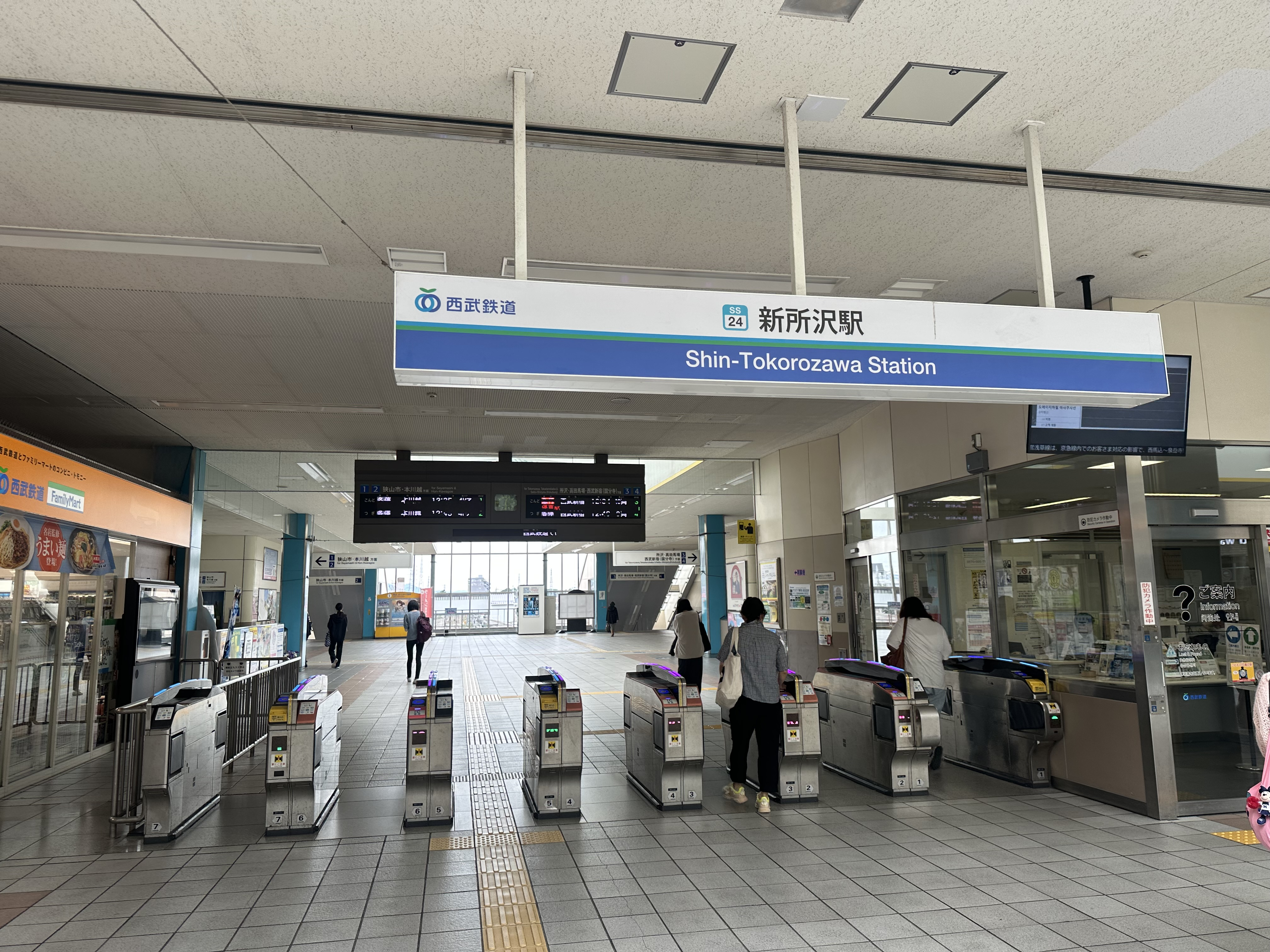
Ticket barriers, May 2025

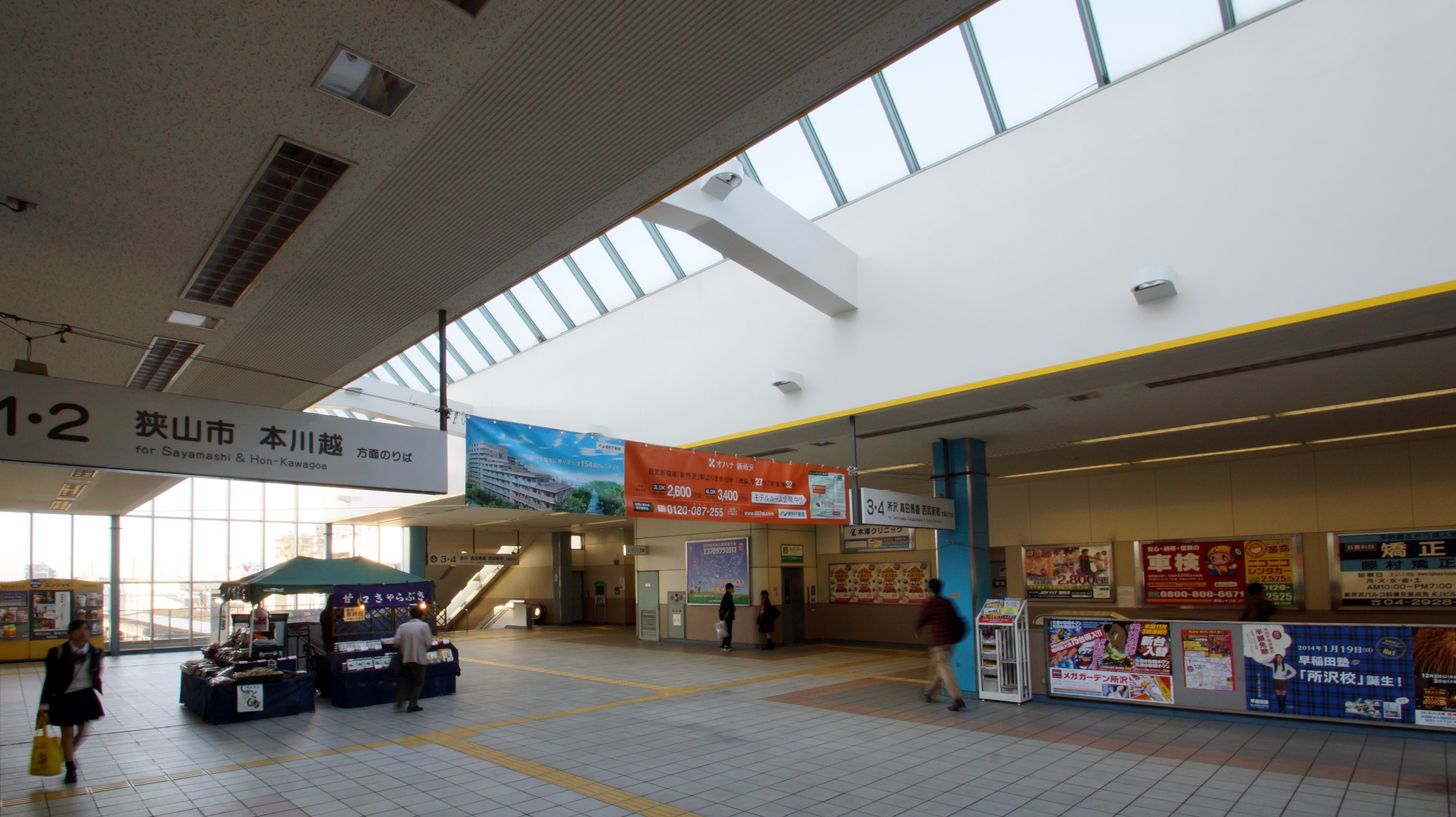
Concourse inside the ticket barriers, November 2013

=== Platforms ===
The station consists of two island platforms serving four tracks.

1/2	Seibu Shinjuku Line	for Hon-Kawagoe
3/4	Seibu Shinjuku Line	for Tokorozawa, Takadanobaba, and Seibu-Shinjuku

From August 2013, an experimental platform edge door system was installed for evaluation purposes at the Tokorozawa end of platform 1 for a period of approximately 8 months. The "Dokodemo Saku" (どこでも柵) platform edge door system jointly developed by the University of Tokyo and Kobe Steel is designed to handle trains with three or four doors per car, and the temporary installation is just one car length long.

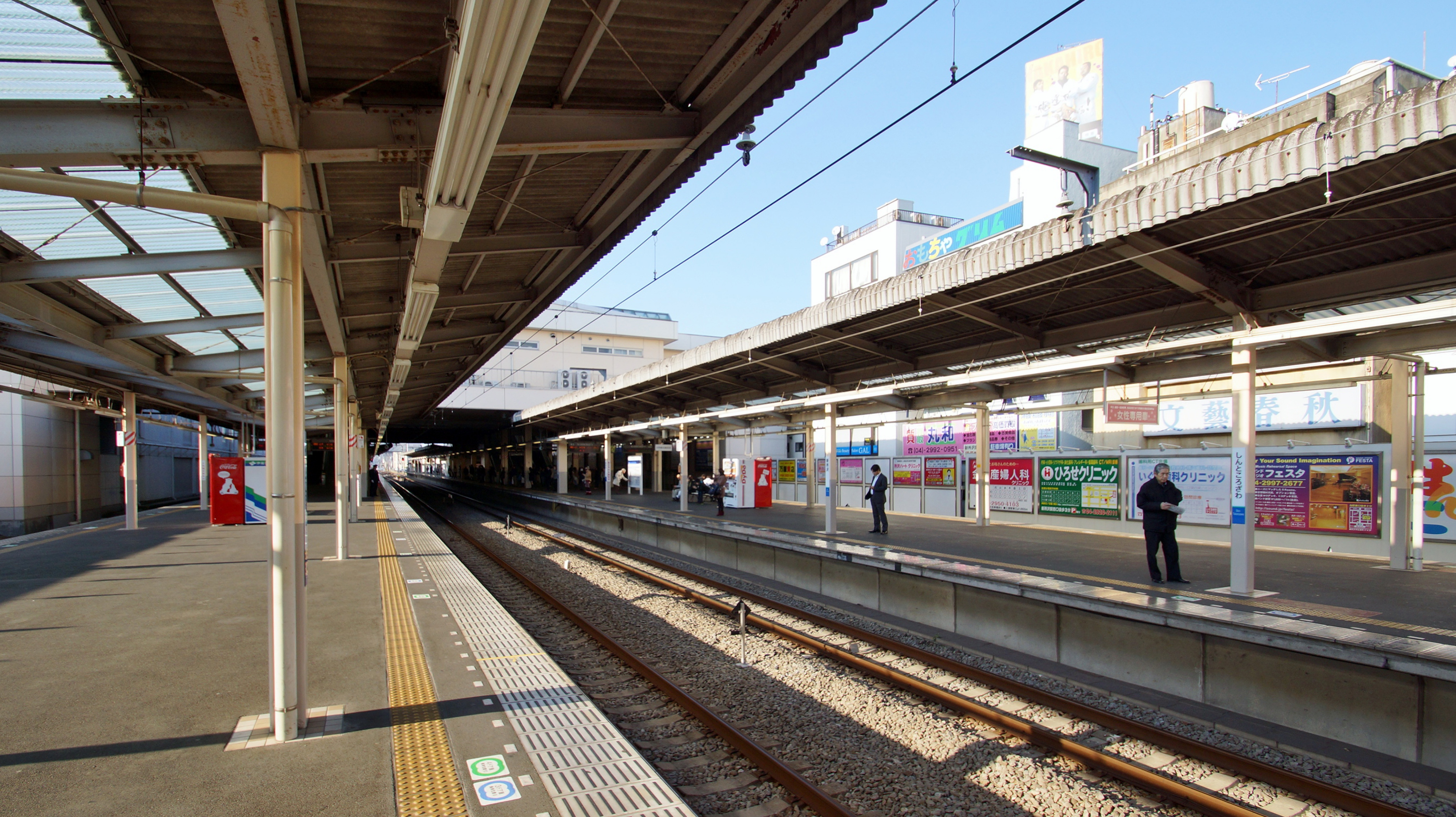
South end of platform 1/2, November 2013

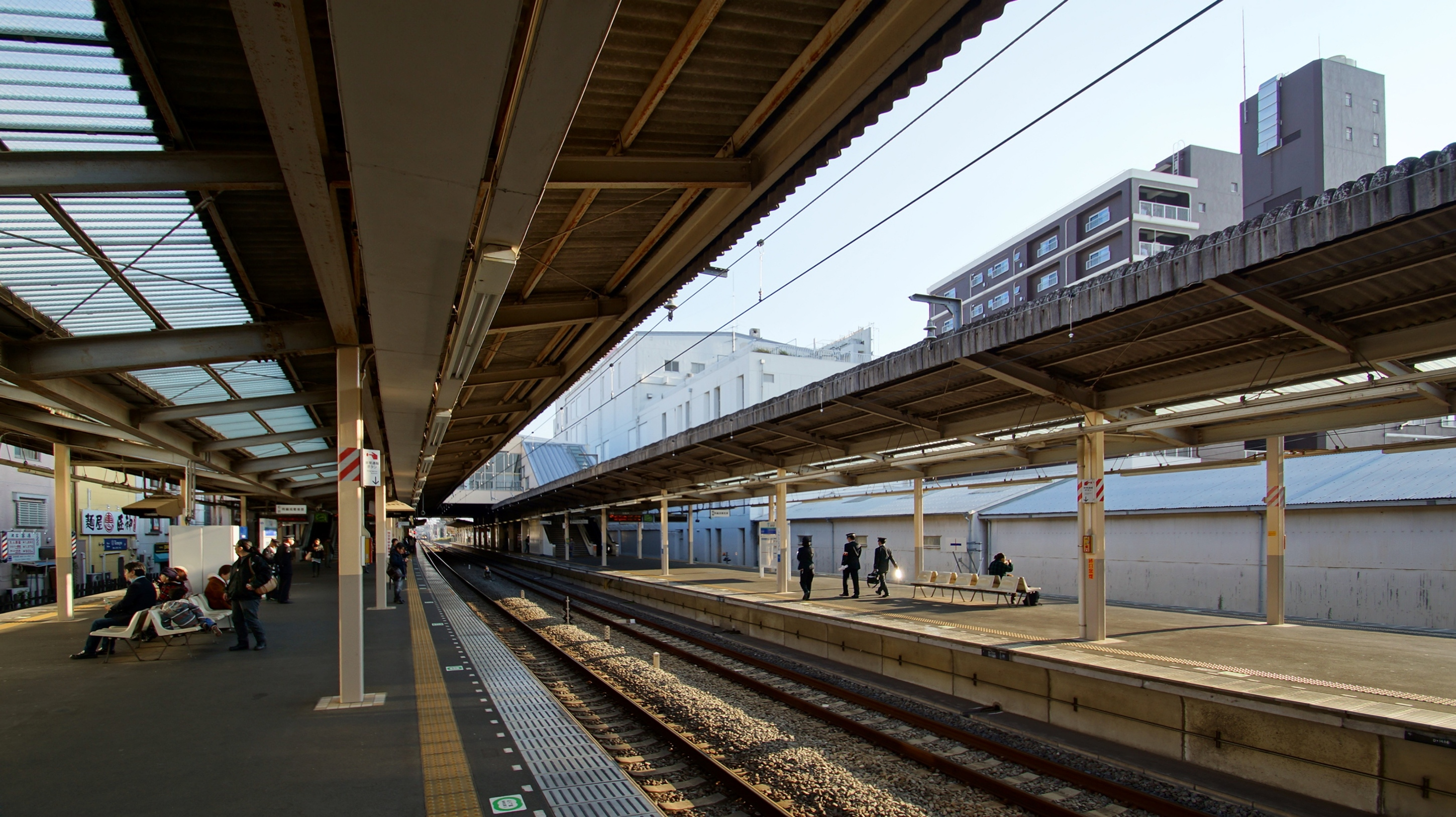
North end of platform 3/4, November 2013

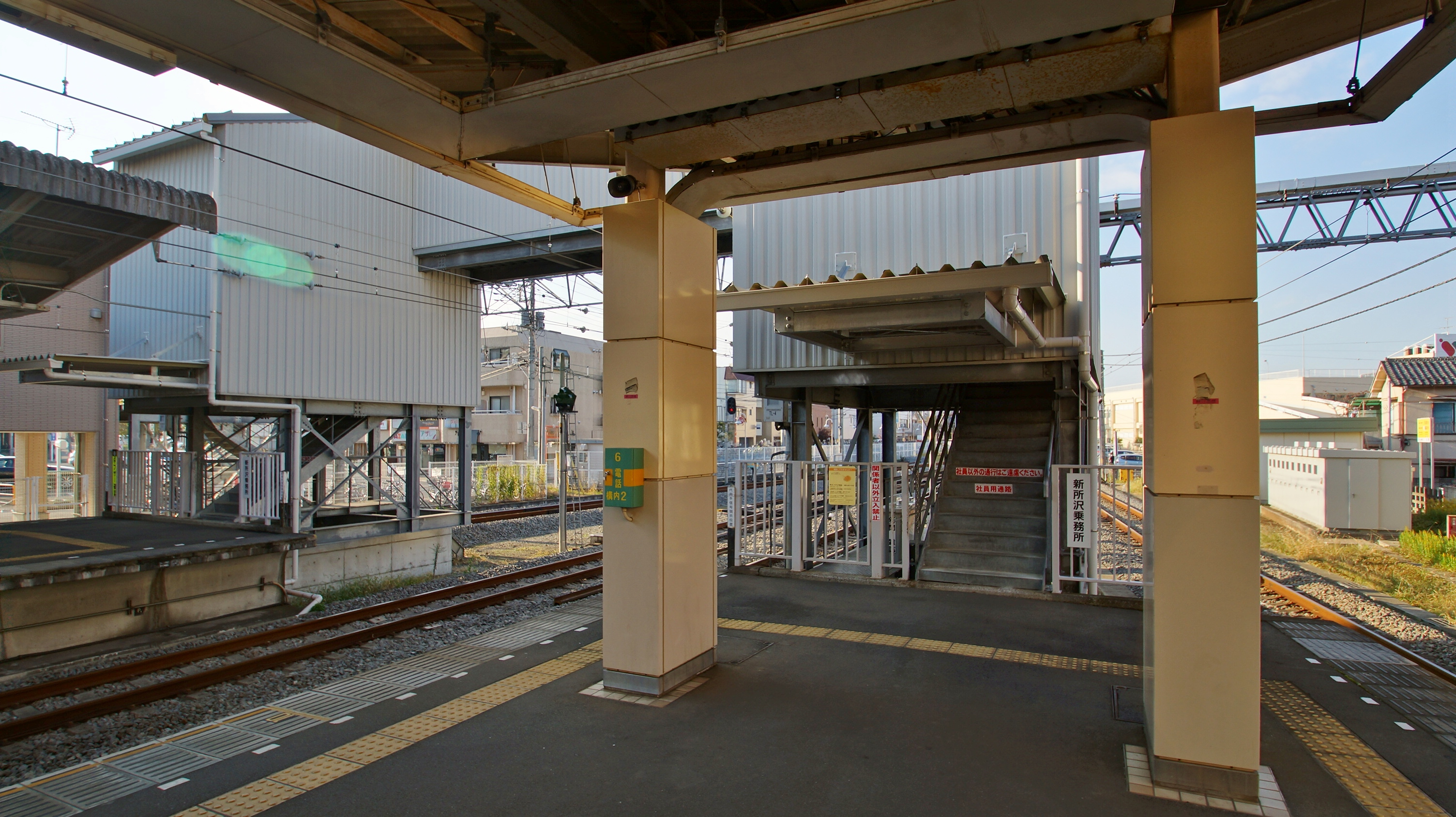
Staff footbridge at the north end of platform 3/4, November 2013

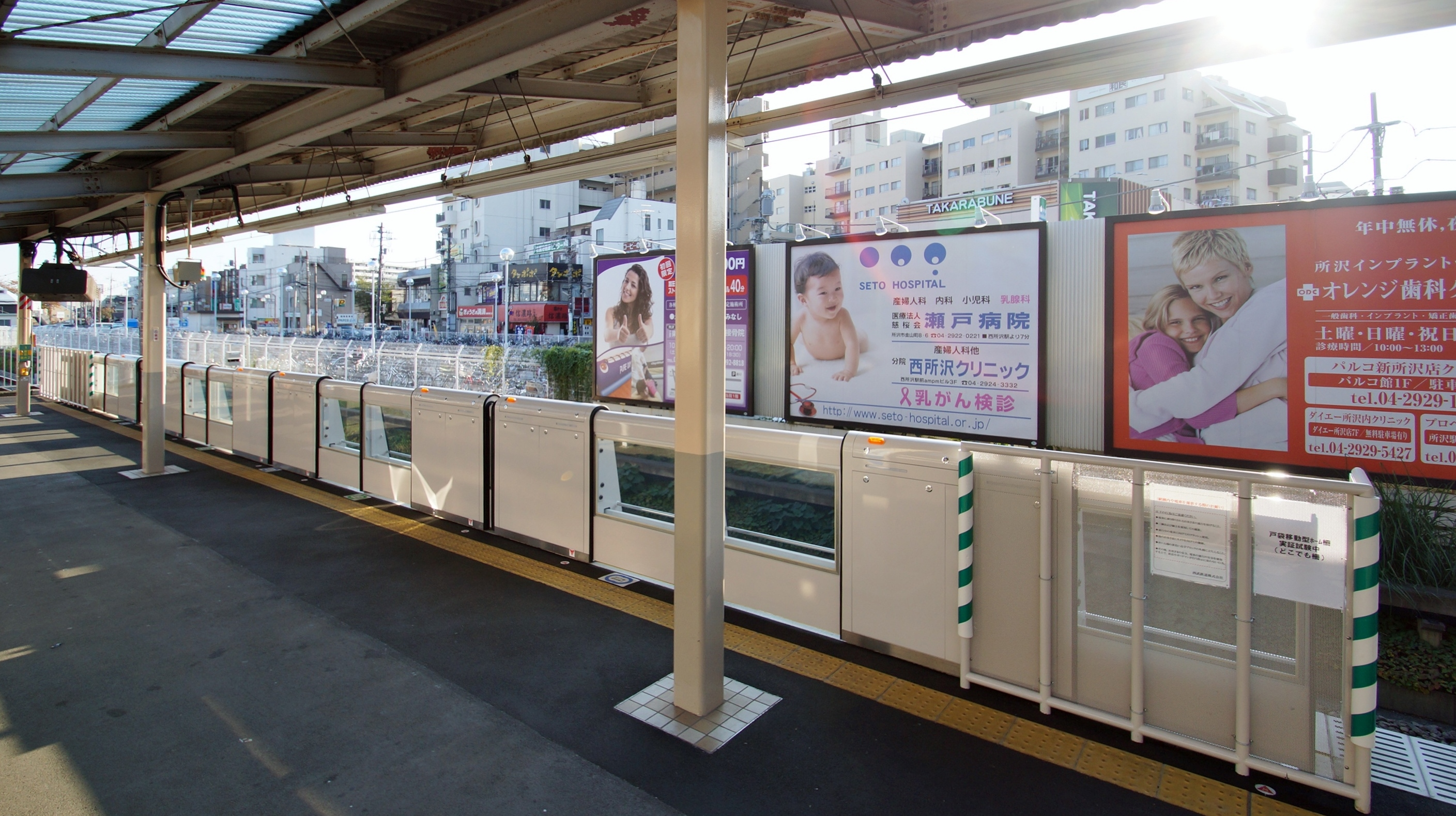
Experimental platform-edge door installation on platform 1, November 2013

== History ==
The station opened on 11 June 1951, initially named Kita-Tokorozawa Station (北所沢駅). It was renamed Shin-Tokorozawa ("New Tokorozawa") on 1 February 1959.

Station numbering was introduced on all Seibu Railway lines during fiscal 2012, with Shin-Tokorozawa Station becoming "SS24".

== Passenger statistics ==
In fiscal 2019, the station was the 17th busiest on the Seibu network with an average of 54,822 passengers daily.

The passenger figures for previous years are as shown below.

Fiscal year	Daily average
2000	62,054
2009	57,821
2010	56,017
2011	54,975
2012	55,628
2013	55,870

== Surrounding area ==
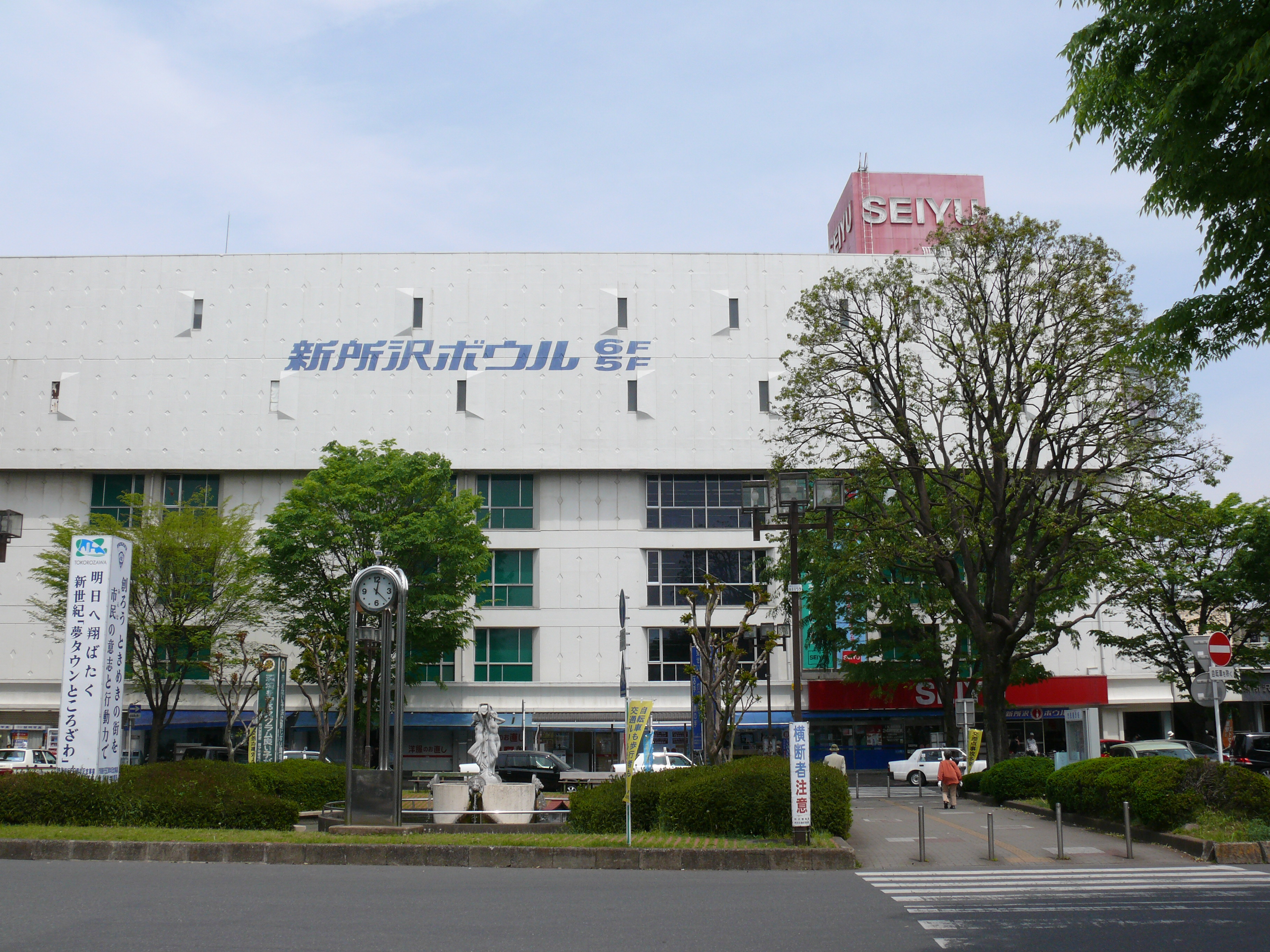
The west side of the station building, showing the Seiyu department store, May 2009

=== East exit ===
- Shin-Tokorozawa Station Koban (police box)
- U.S. Air Force Tokorozawa Transmitter Site
- National Rehabilitation Center for Persons with Disabilities (NRCD)
- Tokorozawa Civic Gymnasium (home of Saitama Broncos Basketball Team)
- Tokorozawa-Kita High School
- Tokorozawa Central High School
- Akikusa Gakuen High School

=== West exit ===
- Midori-chō Koban Police Box
- Midori-chō Park
- Nakasuna Park

== See also ==
- List of railway stations in Japan
