= Sayamashi Station =

Railway station in Sayama, Saitama Prefecture, Japan

SS26 Sayamashi Station 狭山市駅
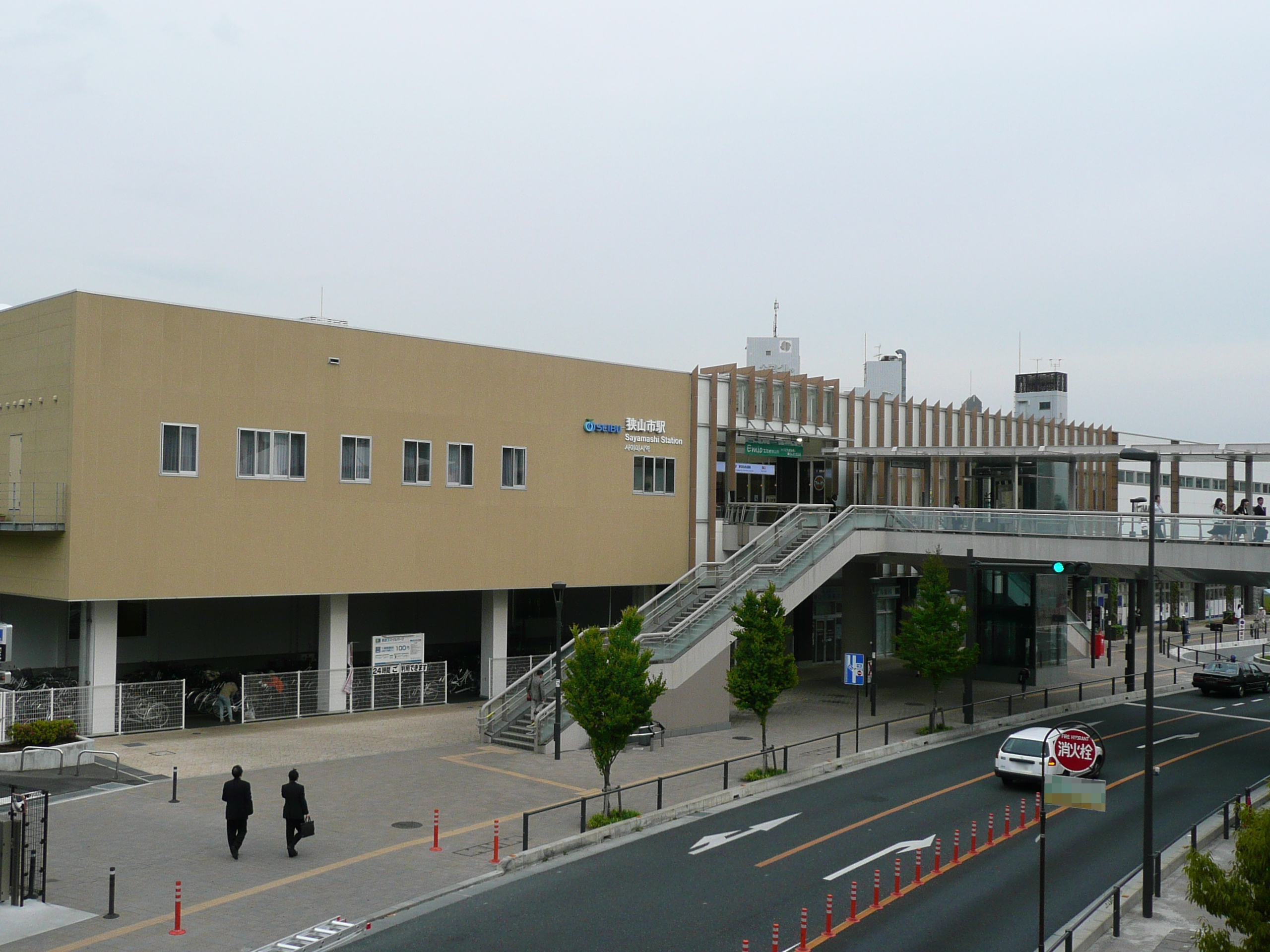
- Sayamashi Station, west side, May 2012

General information
- Location: 1-1-1 Irumagawa, Sayama-shi, Saitama-ken 350–1305; Japan
- Coordinates: 35°51′25″N 139°24′47″E
- Operator: Seibu Railway
- Line: Seibu Shinjuku Line
- Distance: 38.6 km from Seibu-Shinjuku
- Platforms: 2 side platforms

Other information
- Station code: SS26
- Website: Official website

History
- Opened: 21 March 1895

Passengers
- FY2019: 41,050 daily

Services
Preceding station	Seibu Railway	Following station
Hon-Kawagoe SS29 Terminus	Koedo	Tokorozawa SS22 towards Seibu-Shinjuku
Shin-Sayama SS27 towards Hon-Kawagoe	Shinjuku Line Rapid Express	Iriso One-way operation
Hon-Kawagoe One-way operation	Shinjuku Line Commuter Express	Shin-Tokorozawa SS24 towards Seibu-Shinjuku
Shin-Sayama SS27 towards Hon-Kawagoe	Shinjuku Line Express Semi Express Local	Iriso SS25 towards Seibu-Shinjuku
Location
- Location within Saitama Prefecture

Sayamashi Station (狭山市駅, Sayamashi-eki) is a passenger railway station located in the city of Sayama, Saitama, Japan, operated by the private railway operator Seibu Railway.

== Lines ==
Sayamashi Station is served by the Seibu Shinjuku Line between Seibu-Shinjuku Station in Tokyo and Hon-Kawagoe Station in Kawagoe, and is located 38.6 km from the terminus at Seibu-Shinjuku. All services (Koedo, Commuter Express, Express, Semi Express, and Local) stop at this station.

== Station layout ==
The station consists of two side platforms serving two tracks, with an elevated station building located above the platforms.

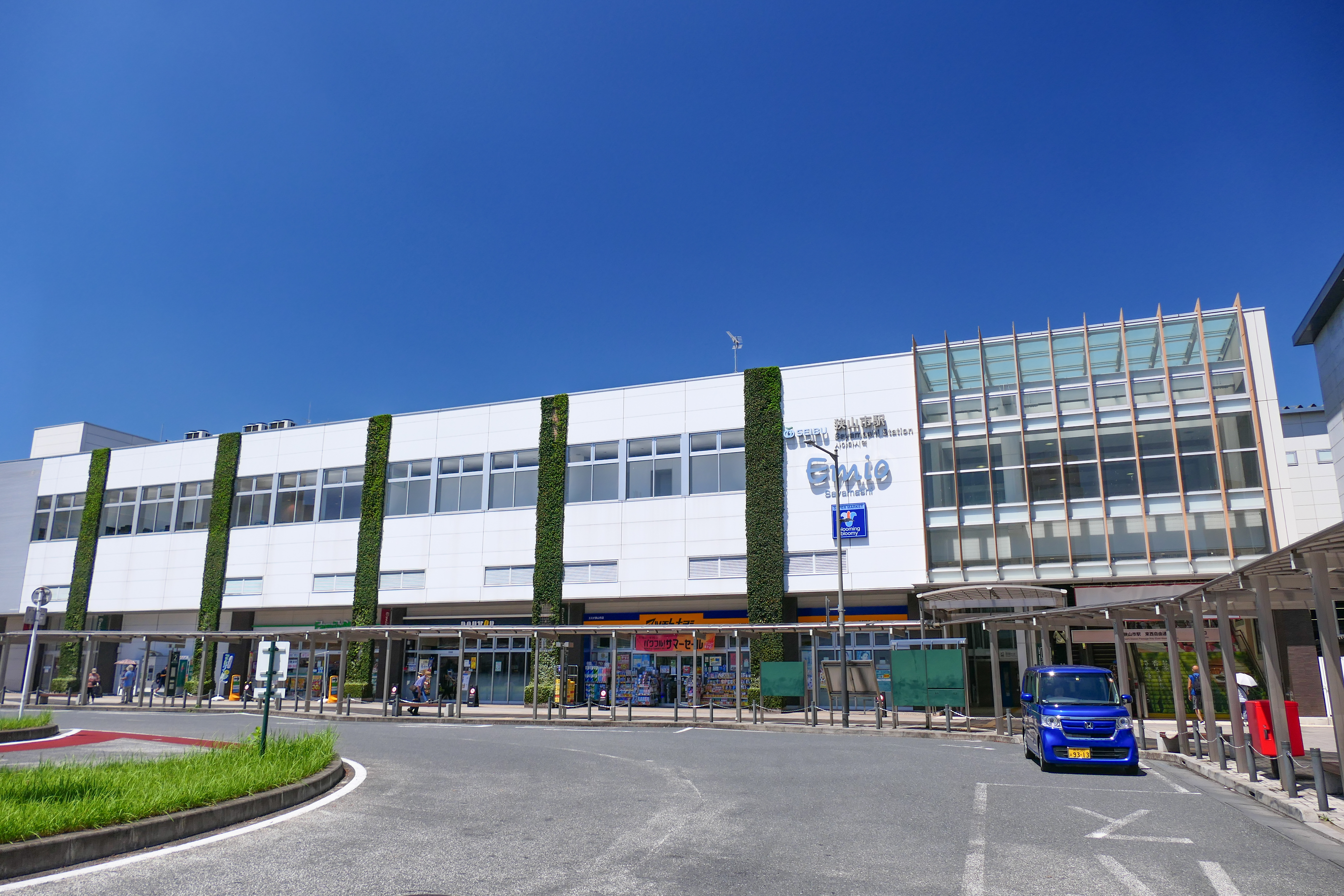
East entrance, July 2022

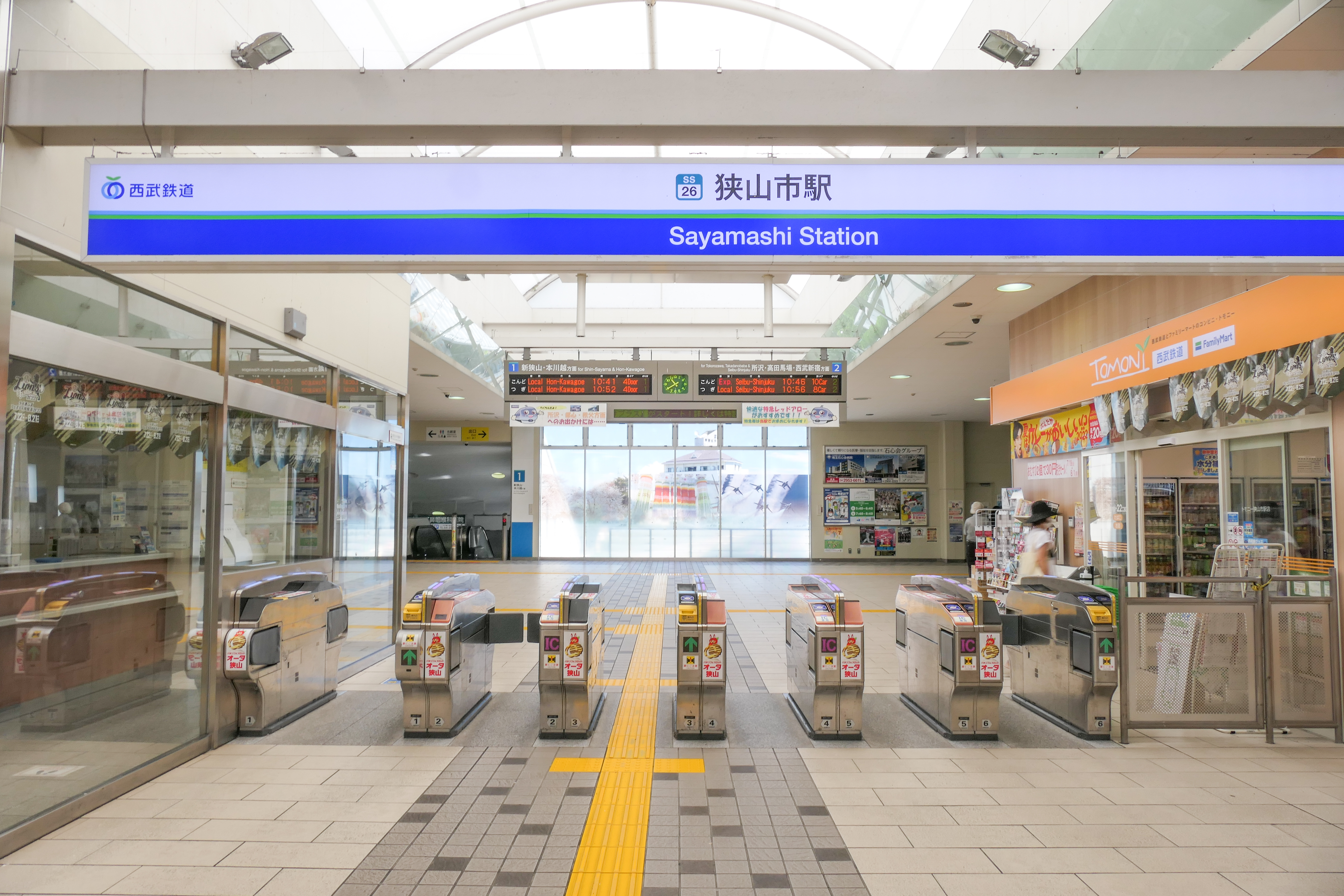
Ticket barriers, July 2022

=== Platforms ===
1	Seibu Shinjuku Line	for Hon-Kawagoe
2	Seibu Shinjuku Line	for Tokorozawa, Takadanobaba, and Seibu-Shinjuku

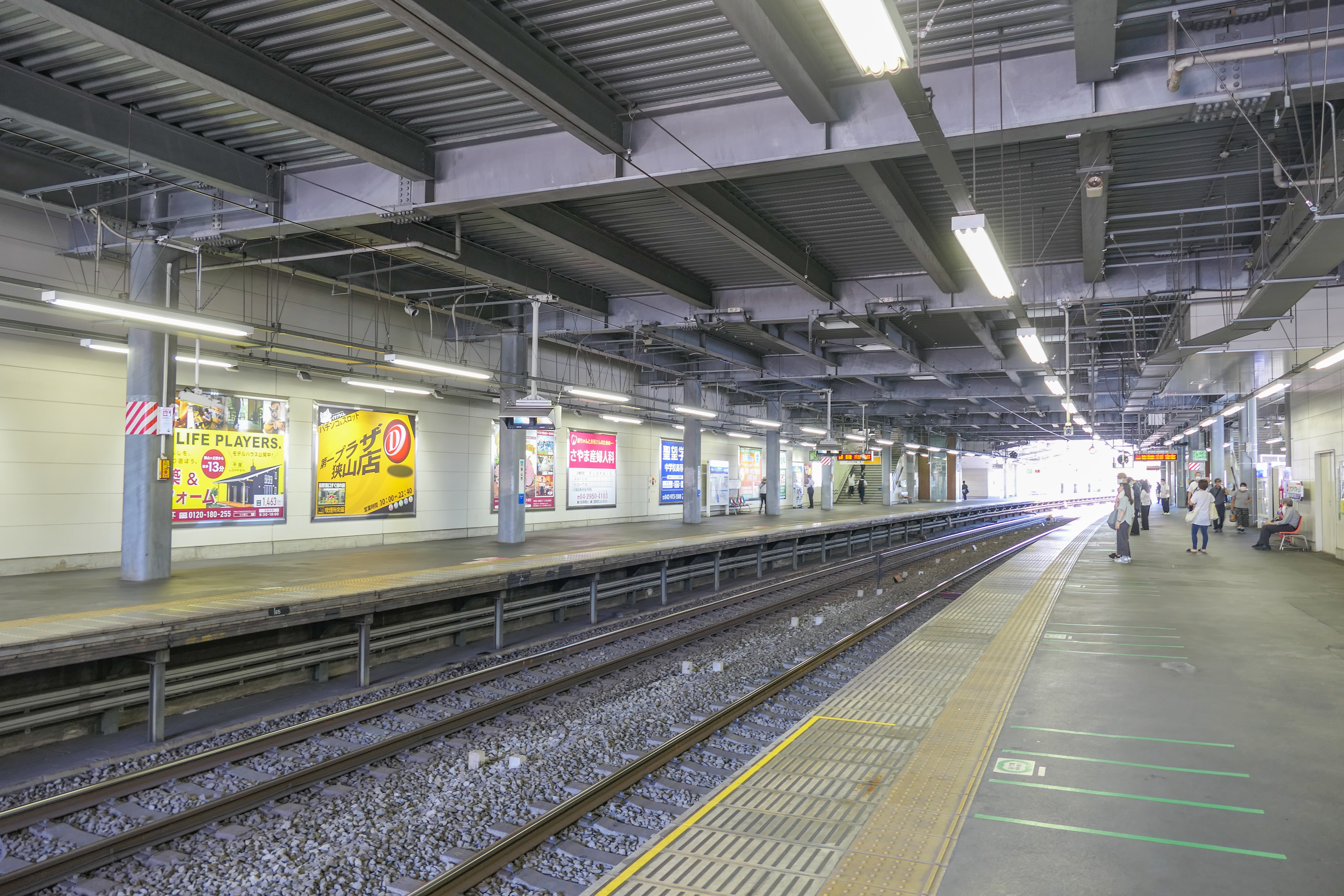
Platforms, July 2022

== History ==
The station opened on 21 March 1895. Station numbering was introduced on all Seibu Railway lines during fiscal 2012, with Sayamashi Station becoming "SS26".

== Passenger statistics ==
In fiscal 2019, the station was the 23rd busiest on the Seibu network with an average of 41,050 passengers daily.

The passenger figures for previous years are as shown below.

Fiscal year	Daily average
2000	52,551
2005	46,263
2010	41,717
2015	40,592

== Surrounding area ==
- Sayama City Office
- Sayama Central Library
- Sayama Technical High School
