= Sayama =

Sayama 狭山市
- City
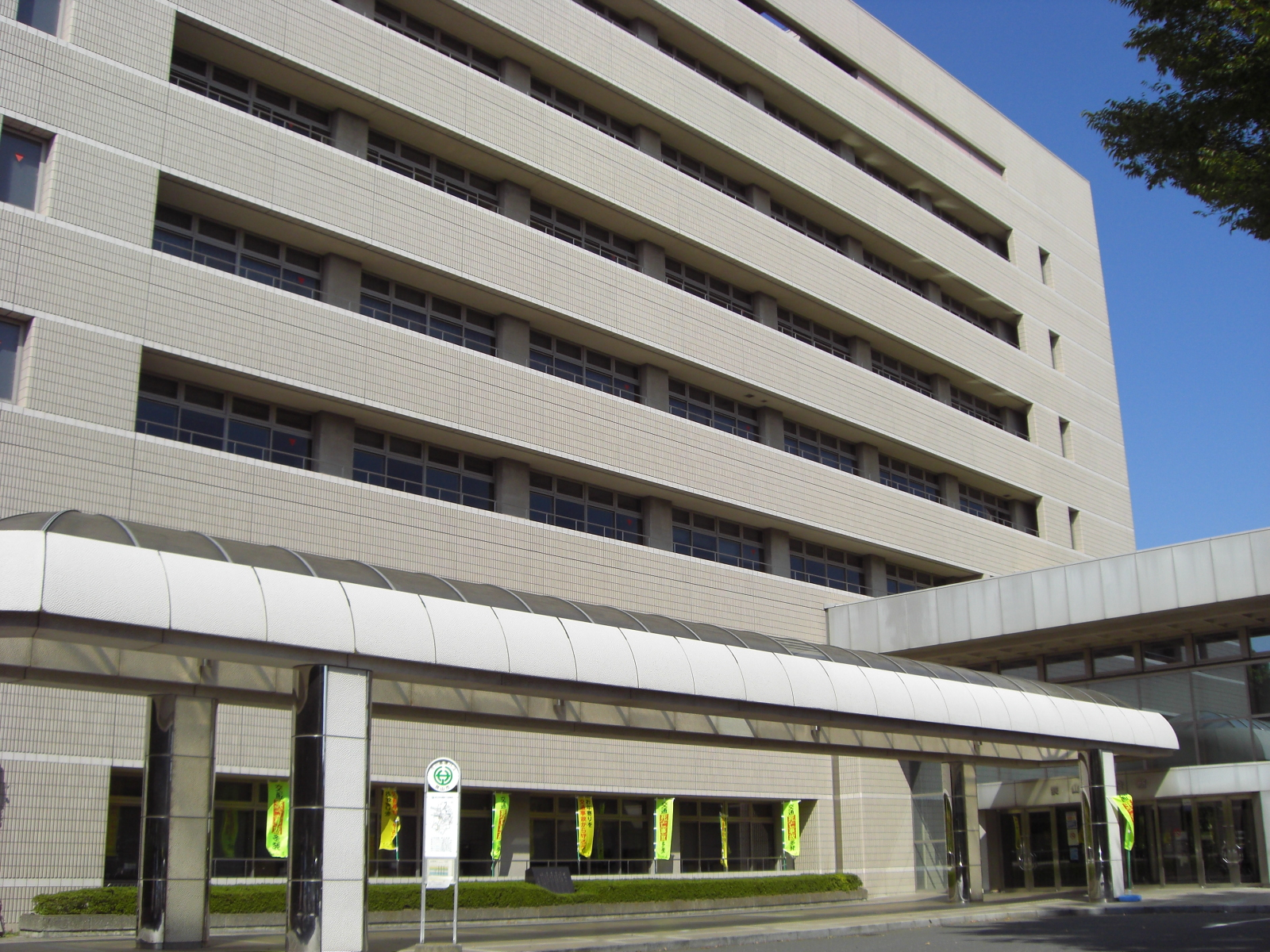
- Sayama City Hall

- Flag Seal

- Location of Sayama in Saitama Prefecture

- Coordinates: 35°51′10.7″N 139°24′43.9″E
- Country: Japan
- Region: Kantō
- Prefecture: Saitama Prefecture

Government
  - Mayor: Teruo Yagasaki (since April 2012)

Area
  - Total: 48.99 km^{2} (18.92 sq mi)

Population (January 2021)
  - Total: 149,826
  - Density: 3,058/km^{2} (7,921/sq mi)
- Time zone: UTC+9 (Japan Standard Time)
- Tree: Camellia sinensis (tea plant)
- Flower: Azalea
- Bird: Azure-winged magpie
- Phone number: 04-2953-1111
- Address: 1-23-5 Irumagawa, Sayama-shi, Saitama-ken 350-1380
- Website: Official website

Sayama (狭山市, Sayama-shi) is a city located in Saitama Prefecture, Japan. As of 1 January 2021, the city had an estimated population of 149,826 in 69,859 households and a population density of 3100 persons per km^{2}. The total area of the city is 45.51 square kilometres (17.57 sq mi).

== Geography ==
Sayama is located in south-central Saitama Prefecture, on the alluvial lowland of the Iruma River, which flows through the city towards the northeast (toward Kawagoe) . The Japan Air Self-Defense Force's Iruma Air Base is located in the south of the city hall, 90% of which is in Sayama city area (and only 10% in Iruma city area).

=== Surrounding municipalities ===
Saitama Prefecture

- Hannō
- Hidaka
- Iruma
- Kawagoe
- Tokorozawa

=== Climate ===
Sayama has a humid subtropical climate (Köppen Cfa) characterized by warm summers and cool winters with light to no snowfall. The average annual temperature in Sayama is 14.3 °C. The average annual rainfall is 1485 mm with September as the wettest month. The temperatures are highest on average in August, at around 26.1 °C, and lowest in January, at around 3.6 °C.

== Demographics ==
Per Japanese census data, the population of Sayama increased nearly fivefold from 1960 to 1990. It peaked at just over 160,000 people around the year 2000 and has declined since.

Historical population
Year	Pop.	±%
1920	21,712	—
1930	23,351	+7.5%
1940	24,215	+3.7%
1950	30,583	+26.3%
1960	32,785	+7.2%
1970	60,886	+85.7%
1980	124,029	+103.7%
1990	157,309	+26.8%
2000	161,460	+2.6%
2010	155,727	−3.6%
2020	148,699	−4.5%

== History ==
During the Kamakura period, the area developed as a post station on the Kamakura Kaidō highway, as the dividing point on the routes to Kōzuke Province and Shimotsuke Province. The town of Irumagawa was established within Iruma District with the establishment of the modern municipalities system on April 1, 1889. On July 1, 1954, Irumagawa merged with the neighboring villages of Mizutomi, Kashiwahara, Okutomi, Hirokane, and Irima to create the city of Sayama.

The city was the location of the Sayama Incident, a 1963 murder and trial which resulted in the false accusation and conviction of an innocent man, a member of the Burakumin minority group, of murder.

== Government ==
Sayama has a mayor-council form of government with a directly elected mayor and a unicameral city council of 22 members. Sayama contributes two members to the Saitama Prefectural Assembly. In terms of national politics, the city is part of Saitama 9th district of the lower house of the Diet of Japan.

== Economy ==
Sayama is one of the major industrial centers of Saitama Prefecture, although it is also a bedroom community with over 15% of its population commuting to Tokyo for work. The city, along with neighboring Iruma, is a well known tea growing region, producing Sayama Tea.

=== Honda assembly plant ===
Sayama is the location of an automobile assembly plant, which opened in 1964, for Honda/Acura vehicles, currently including the Fit, Honda Odyssey (international), CR-V, RLX, and Clarity and in the past the Accord, Prelude, Vigor, Inspire, Legend and Integra. The plant was briefly closed, but not damaged, following the March 2011 Tōhoku earthquake and tsunami, and restarted production in April 2011, albeit at lower production levels. In 2017, Honda announced that the Sayama plant will close in March 2022, after production of the Odyssey and Clarity models end. Honda will consolidate production at its Yorii factory for future models.

=== Other businesses ===
The Lotte candy and food processing company operates a facility in Sayama.

Dai Nippon Printing Company, Ltd. imaging media division operates a large coating facility in the city.

Sankyo Flute Company is located in Sayama.

Sayama Haselfoods is the only baklava manufacturing facility in Japan. Located in Aoyagi, Sayama, Haselfoods also imports food products from the Mediterranean.

== Education ==
=== University ===
- Bunri University of Hospitality
- Musashino Gakuin University
- Tokyo Kasei University – Sayama campus

=== Primary and secondary education ===
- Sayama has 15 public elementary schools and eight public middle schools operated by the city government, and four public high schools operated by the Saitama Prefectural Board of Education. In addition, there is one private elementary school, one private junior high school and two private high schools. The prefecture also operates one special education school for the handicapped.

== Transportation ==
=== Railway ===
Seibu Railway - Seibu Shinjuku Line

- Iriso - Sayamashi - Shin-Sayama

Seibu Railway - Seibu Ikebukuro Line

- Inariyama-kōen

=== Highway ===
- Ken-Ō Expressway
- National Route 16
- National Route 299
- National Route 407

== Military facilities ==
- Iruma Air Base

== Sister cities ==
- Worthington, Ohio, United States, since November 1, 1999
- Hangzhou, Zhejiang, China, friendship city since July 8, 1996
- Tongyeong, South Gyeongsang, South Korea, since July 4, 1973

== Local attractions ==
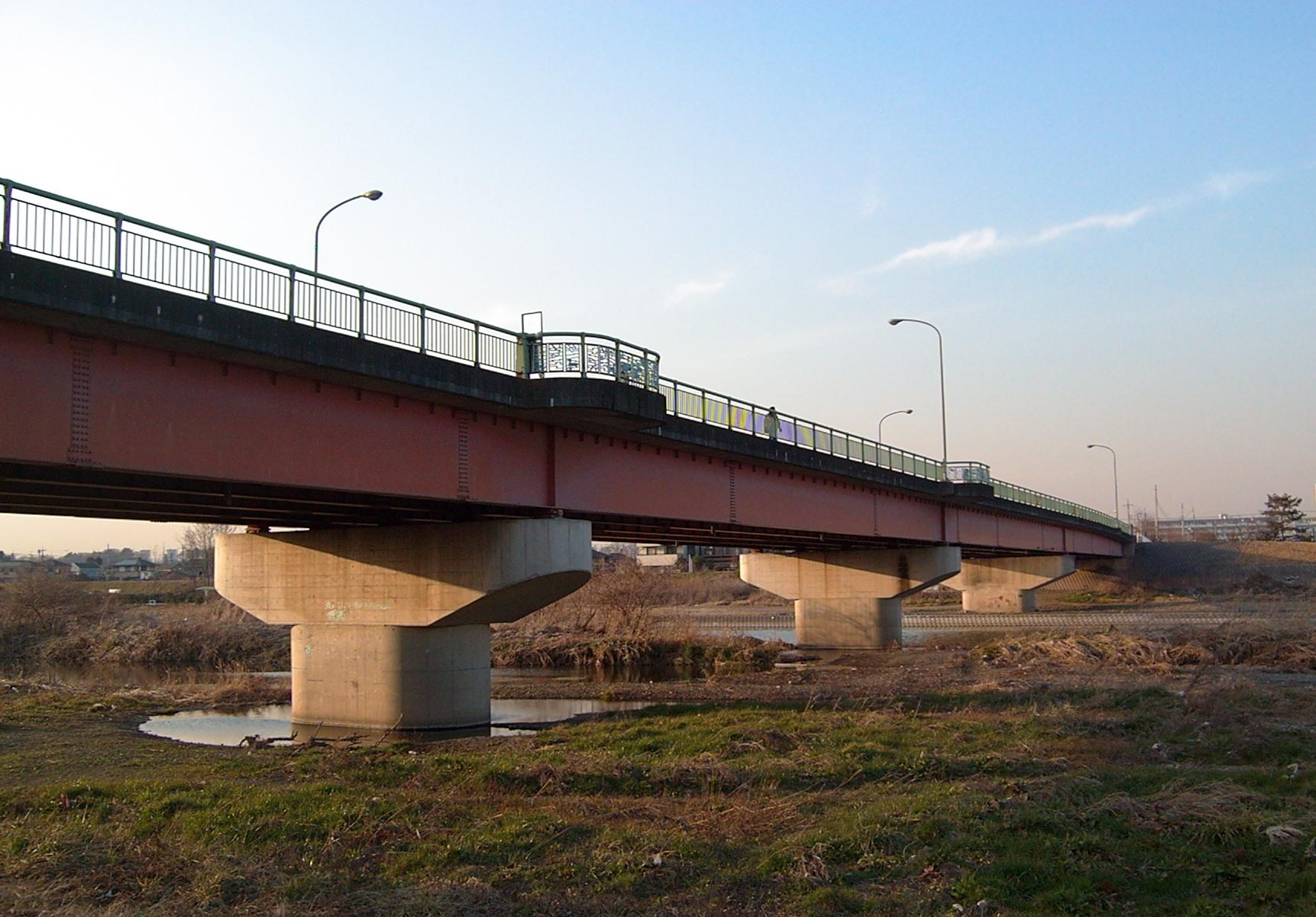
Hirose bridge, over the Iruma River

- Irumagawa Tanabata Matsuri.
- Sayama Inariyama Park
- Sayama Ski Area, an Indoor ski slope
- Shimizu Hachiman-gu

== Sports ==
The Secom Rugguts rugby union team, and the Saitama Soccer Club of the Kantō Soccer League, are located in Sayama.

== In popular culture ==
- Asteroid 4461 Sayama was named after the city.

== Noted people from Sayama ==
- Tetsurō Araki, anime director
- Mitsuo Hashimoto, manga artist
- Yohei Hayashi, footballer
- Ryuji Hijikata, professional wrestler
- Kensuke Kazama, photographer
- Shiori Kazama, director, The Mars Canon
- Akari Kurishima, footballer
- Matsushige Ohno, politician
