= Tokorozawa Station =

Railway station in Tokorozawa, Saitama Prefecture, Japan

SI17 SS22 Tokorozawa Station 所沢駅
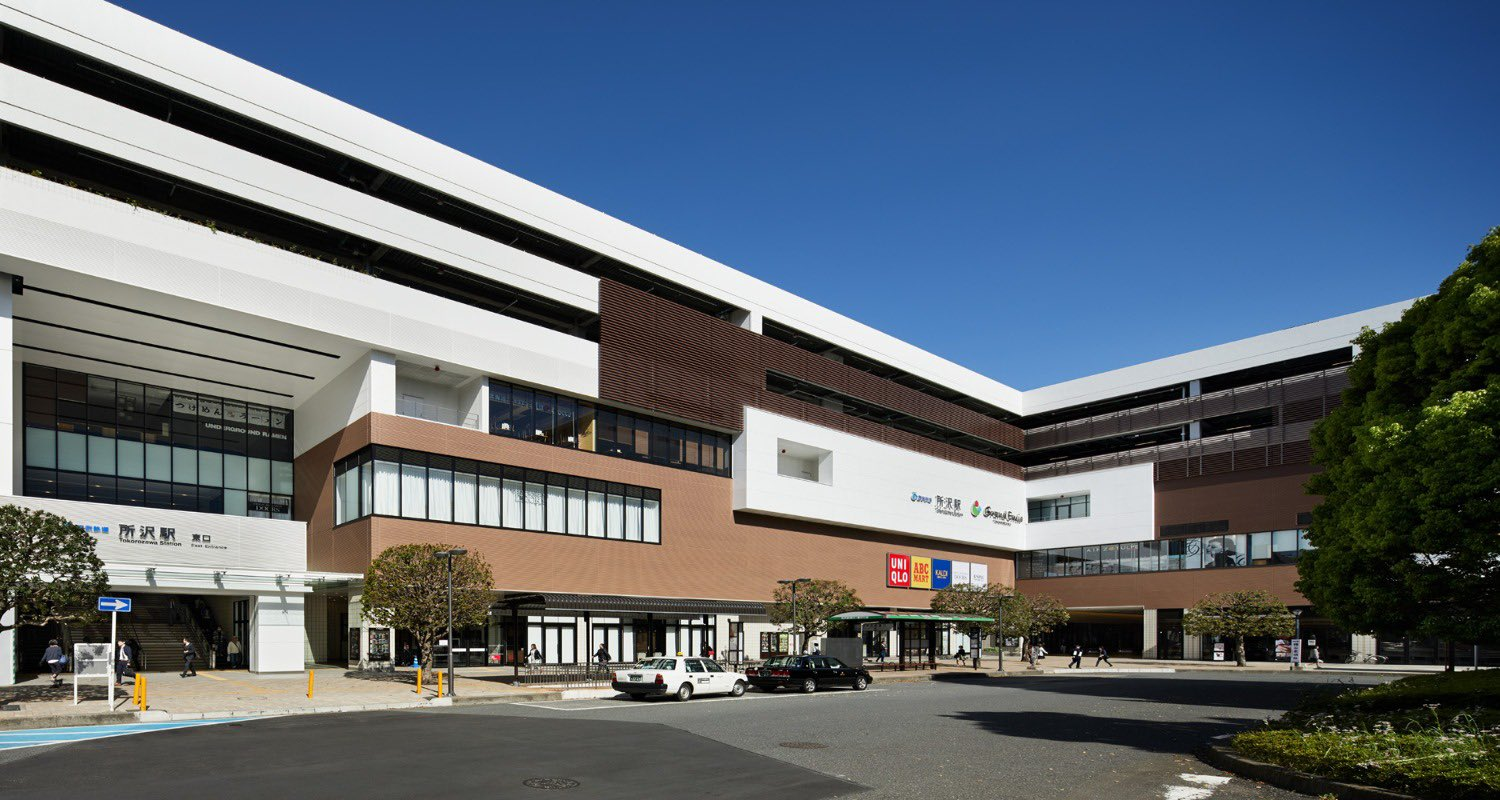
- Station building, September 2020

General information
- Location: 1-14-5 Kusunokidai, Tokorozawa-shi, Saitama-ken 359-0037; Japan
- Coordinates: 35°47′13″N 139°28′24″E
- Operator: Seibu Railway
- Lines: Seibu Ikebukuro Line; Seibu Shinjuku Line
- Distance: 28.9 km from Seibu-Shinjuku
- Platforms: 1 side + 2 island platforms
- Tracks: 5
- Connections: Bus terminal

Other information
- Station code: SS22, SI17
- Website: Official website

History
- Opened: 21 March 1895; 131 years ago

Passengers
- FY2019: 102,368 daily
Services
Preceding station	Seibu Railway	Following station
Irumashi SI23 towards Seibu-Chichibu	Chichibu	Ikebukuro SI01 Terminus
Irumashi SI23 towards Hannō	Musashi	Ikebukuro SI01 Terminus
Nishi-Tokorozawa SI18 (one-way trains, alighting only) towards Kotesashi	S-Train (weekdays)	Hoya SI12 towards Toyosu
Irumashi SI23 towards Seibu-Chichibu	S-Train Weekends (Weekends and national holidays)	Shakujii-kōen SI10 towards Motomachi-Chūkagai
Kotesashi SI19 towards Hannō	F Liner	Hibarigaoka SI13 towards Motomachi-Chūkagai
Kotesashi SI19 towards Hannō	Ikebukuro Line Rapid Express	Hibarigaoka SI13 towards Ikebukuro or Nerima
Nishi-Tokorozawa SI18 towards Hannō	Ikebukuro Line Express	Hibarigaoka SI13 towards Ikebukuro
Nishi-Tokorozawa One-way operation	Ikebukuro Line Commuter Express	Higashi-Kurume SI14 towards Ikebukuro
Nishi-Tokorozawa SI18 towards Hannō	Ikebukuro Line Rapid	Akitsu SI16 towards Ikebukuro
Nishi-Tokorozawa One-way operation	Ikebukuro Line Commuter Semi Express	Akitsu SI16 towards Ikebukuro
Nishi-Tokorozawa SI18 towards Hannō	Ikebukuro Line Semi Express	Akitsu SI16 towards Ikebukuro
Nishi-Tokorozawa SI18 towards Agano	Ikebukuro Line Local	Akitsu SI16 towards Ikebukuro
Sayamashi SS26 towards Hon-Kawagoe	Koedo	Higashi-Murayama SS21 towards Seibu-Shinjuku
Shin-Tokorozawa SS24 towards Hon-Kawagoe	Shinjuku Line Rapid Express	Higashi-Murayama One-way operation
Shin-Tokorozawa One-way operation	Shinjuku Line Commuter Express	Higashi-Murayama SS21 towards Seibu-Shinjuku
Kōkū-kōen SS23 towards Hon-Kawagoe	Shinjuku Line Express Semi Express Local	Higashi-Murayama SS21 towards Seibu-Shinjuku
Location
- Location within Saitama Prefecture Location within Japan

Station from above, 2021

Tokorozawa Station (所沢駅, Tokorozawa-eki) is a junction passenger railway station located in the city of Tokorozawa, Saitama, Japan, operated by the private railway operator Seibu Railway.

== Lines ==
Tokorozawa Station is served by the Seibu Ikebukuro Line from Ikebukuro in Tokyo to Hannō, and by the Seibu Shinjuku Line from Seibu-Shinjuku to Hon-Kawagoe in Saitama Prefecture. Some Ikebukuro Line services inter-run via the Tokyo Metro Yurakucho Line to Shin-Kiba and the Tokyo Metro Fukutoshin Line to Shibuya and onward via the Tokyu Toyoko Line and Minatomirai Line to Motomachi-Chukagai. On the Seibu Ikebukuro Line, it is located between Akitsu and Nishi-Tokorozawa, and is 24.8 km from the Ikebukuro terminus. On the Seibu Shinjuku Line, it is located between Higashi-Murayama and Kōkū-kōen, and is 28.9 km from the Seibu-Shinjuku terminus.

All train services stop at this station.

== Station layout ==
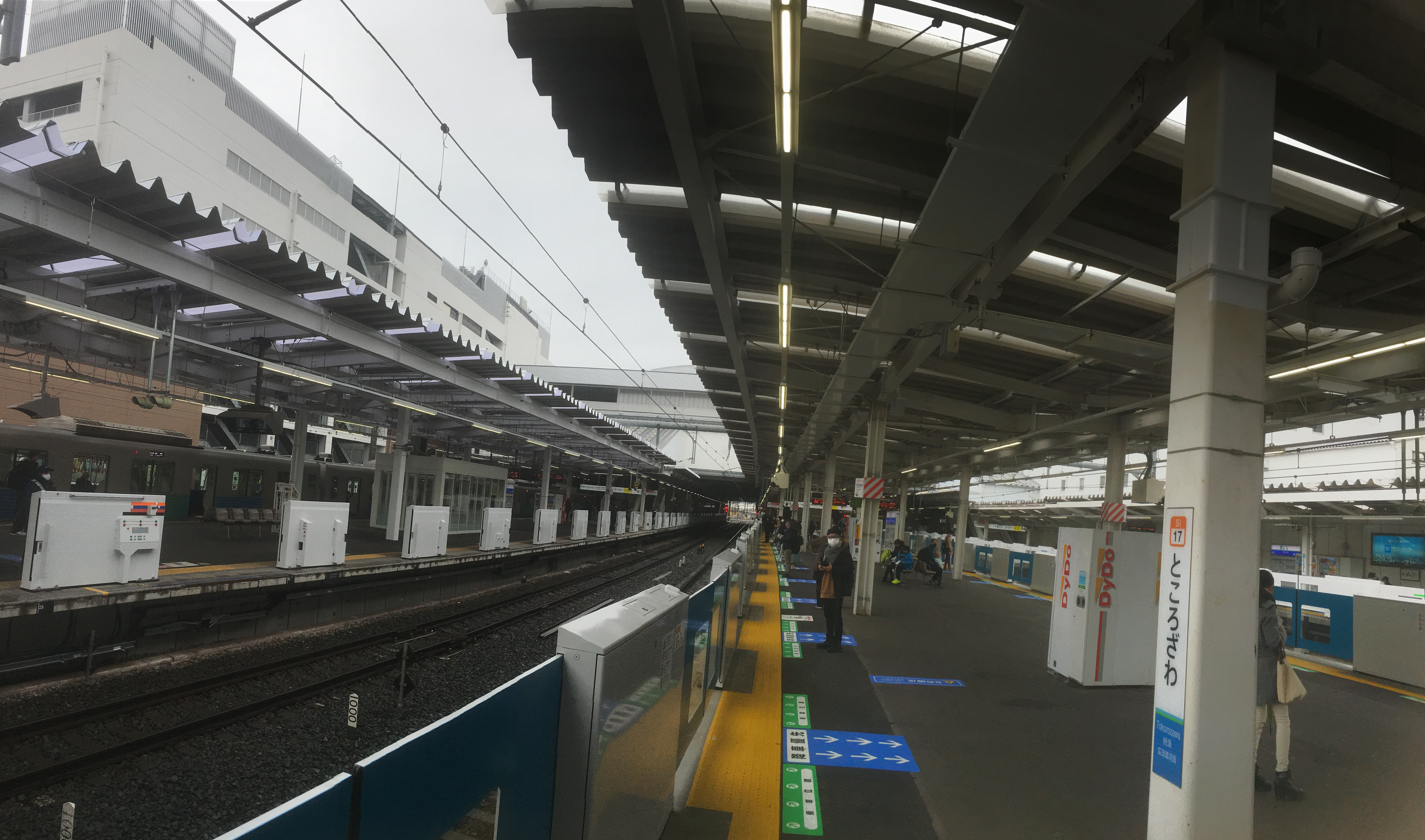
The platforms in January 2021

The station consists of one side platform and two island platforms serving five tracks.

=== Platforms ===
1	Seibu Shinjuku Line	for Hon-Kawagoe
2	Seibu Shinjuku Line	for Tanashi, Takadanobaba, and Seibu-Shinjuku
3	Seibu Ikebukuro Line	for Nerima and Ikebukuro; Tokyo Metro Yurakucho Line for Shin-Kiba; Tokyo Metro Fukutoshin Line for Shibuya; Tōkyū Tōyoko Line for Yokohama; Minatomirai Line for Motomachi-Chukagai
4	Seibu Ikebukuro Line	for Kotesashi, Hannō, and Seibu-Chichibu
5	Seibu Ikebukuro Line	for Kotesashi, Hannō, and Seibu-Chichibu

== History ==
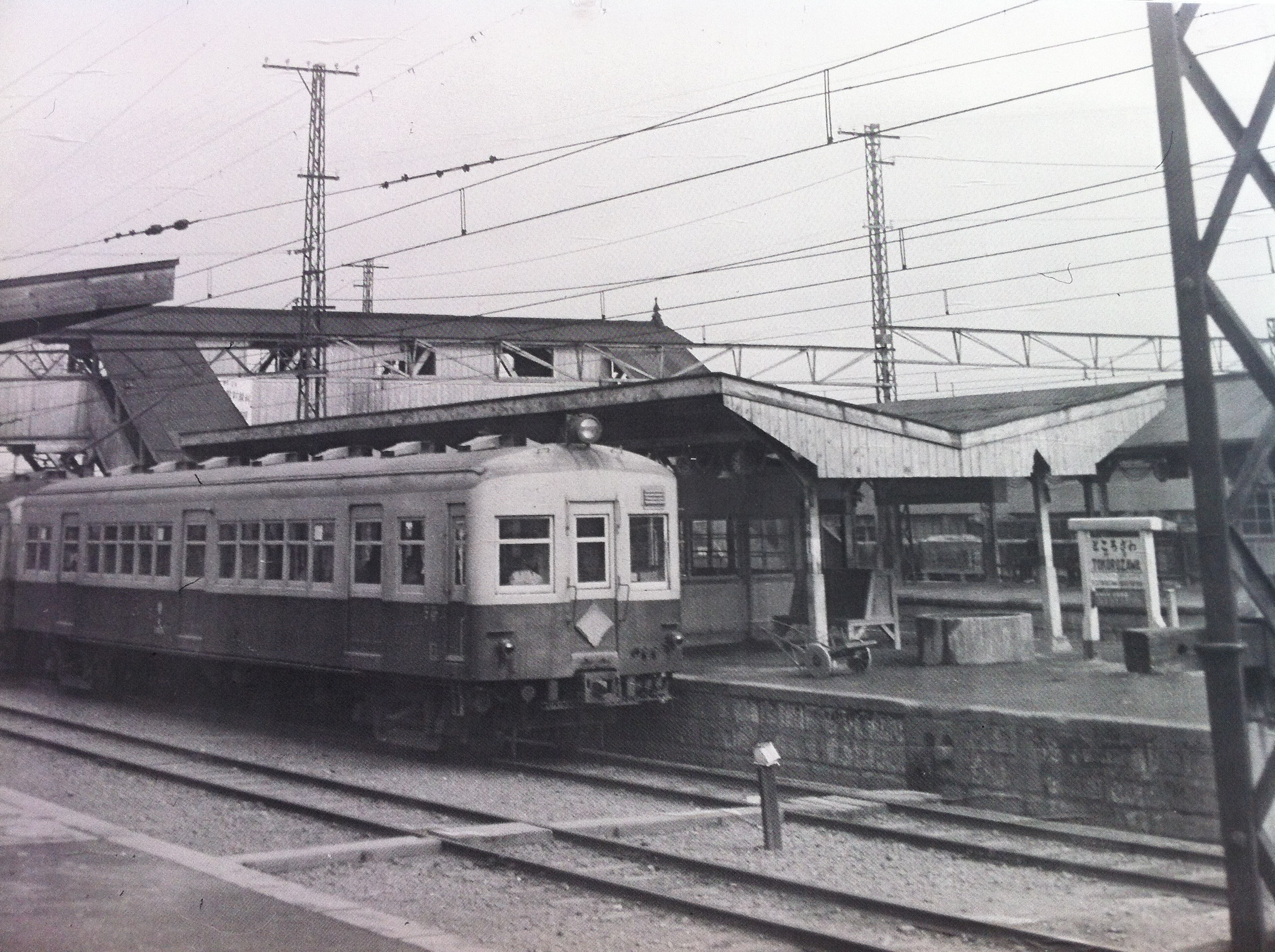
Tokorozawa station in 1952

The station opened on 21 March 1895. The station building was rebuilt in 2012, with the new station building opened on 8 March 2012. The former west entrance closed from this date.

Station numbering was introduced on all Seibu Railway lines during fiscal 2012, with Tokorozawa Station becoming "SS22" on the Seibu Shinjuku Line and "SI17" on the Seibu Ikebukuro Line.

Through-running on the Seibu Ikebukuro Line to and from Yokohama and Motomachi-Chukagai via the Tokyu Toyoko Line and Minatomirai Line commenced on 16 March 2013.

Automatic platform gates were put into service at Tokorozawa Station from 30 October 2020.

== Passenger statistics ==
In fiscal 2019, the station was the 7th busiest on the Seibu network with an average of 102,368 passengers daily. The passenger figures for previous years are as shown below.

Fiscal year	Daily average
2000	87,558
2009	96,156
2010	94,827
2011	93,399
2012	95,309
2013	96,485

== Surrounding area ==
=== East exit ===
- Seibu Holdings head office
- Seibu Bus head office

=== South/West exit ===
- Seibu Railway Workshops (closed)

A Grand Emio was built around Tokorozawa Station. It is composed of around 120 stores. It was completed on September 2, 2020.

== See also ==
- List of railway stations in Japan
