= Hon-Kawagoe Station =

Railway station in Kawagoe, Saitama Prefecture, Japan

SS29 Hon-Kawagoe Station 本川越駅
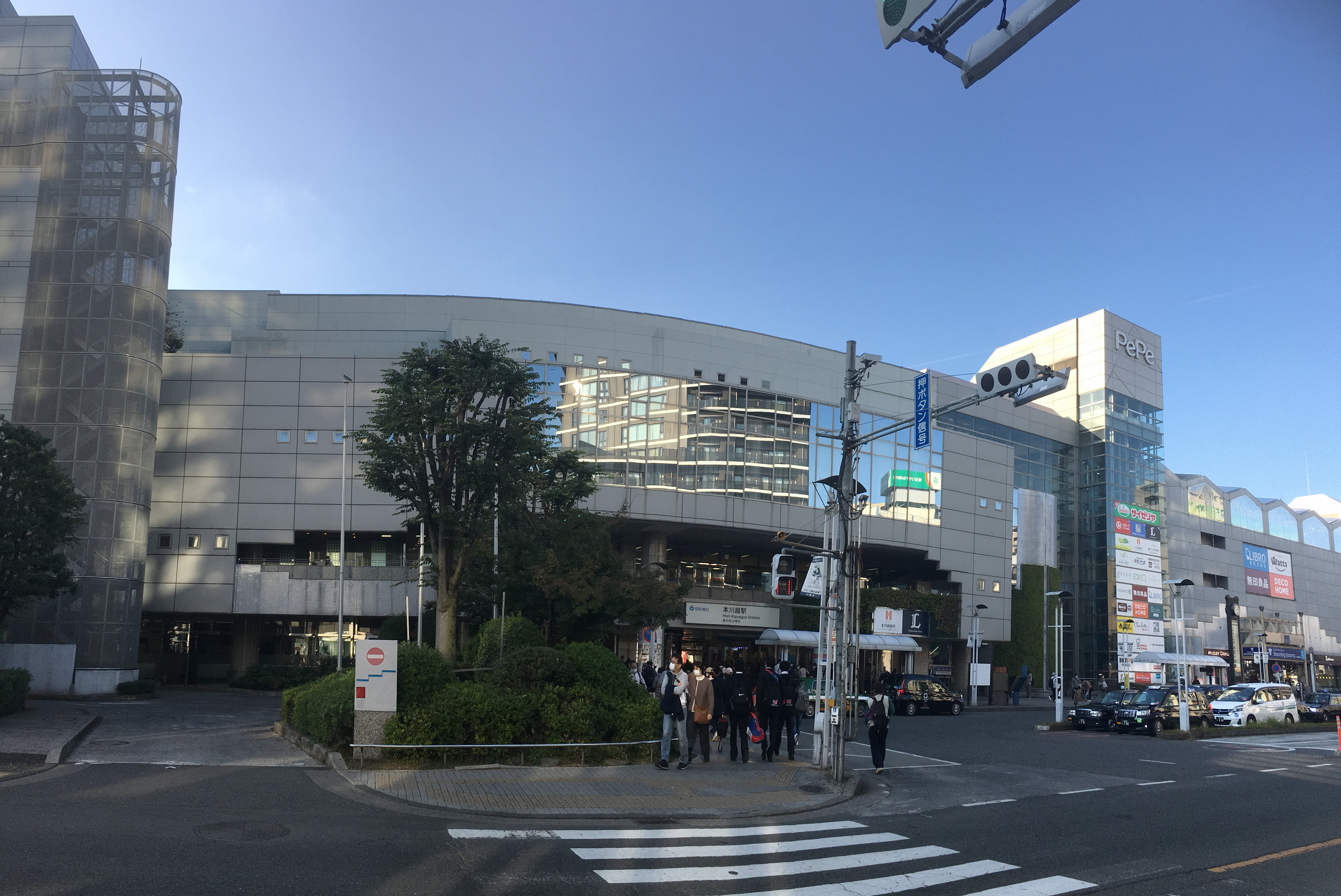
- The east side of Hon-Kawagoe Station in November 2020

General information
- Location: 1-22 Shintomi-chō, Kawagoe-shi, Saitama-ken 350-0043; Japan
- Coordinates: 35°54′50″N 139°28′52″E
- Operator: Seibu Railway
- Line: Seibu Shinjuku Line
- Distance: 47.5 km (30 miles) from Seibu-Shinjuku
- Connections: Bus terminal; Kawagoeshi Station (Tōbu Tōjō Line)

Other information
- Station code: SS29
- Website: Official website

History
- Opened: 21 March 1895
- Former names: Kawagoe (until 1940)

Passengers
- FY2019: 53,230 daily

Services
| Preceding station | Seibu Railway | Following station |
|---|---|---|
| Terminus | Koedo | Sayamashi SS26 towards Seibu-Shinjuku |
| Terminus | Shinjuku Line Rapid Express | Minami-Ōtsuka One-way operation |
| Terminus | Shinjuku Line Commuter Express | Sayamashi SS26 towards Seibu-Shinjuku |
| Terminus | Shinjuku Line Express Semi Express Local | Minami-Ōtsuka SS28 towards Seibu-Shinjuku |
Location
- Location within Saitama Prefecture

Hon-Kawagoe Station (本川越駅, Honkawagoe-eki) is a passenger railway station on the Seibu Shinjuku Line located in the city of Kawagoe, Saitama, Japan, operated by the private railway operator Seibu Railway. This is one of three main stations of the city; the other two are Kawagoe Station and Kawagoeshi Station.

== Lines ==
Hon-Kawagoe Station is the terminus of the 47.5 km (30 mile) Seibu Shinjuku Line from Seibu-Shinjuku Station in Tokyo.

The station is approximately 5 minutes' walk from Kawagoeshi Station on the Tōbu Tōjō Line, and 15 minutes' walk from Kawagoe Station on the JR Kawagoe Line and Tōbu Tōjō Line.

Track diagram

== Station layout ==
The station has three terminating tracks situated at ground level. The main ticket barriers are located on the ground floor level, with additional ticket barriers on the second floor providing direct access to the adjoining Pepe department store.

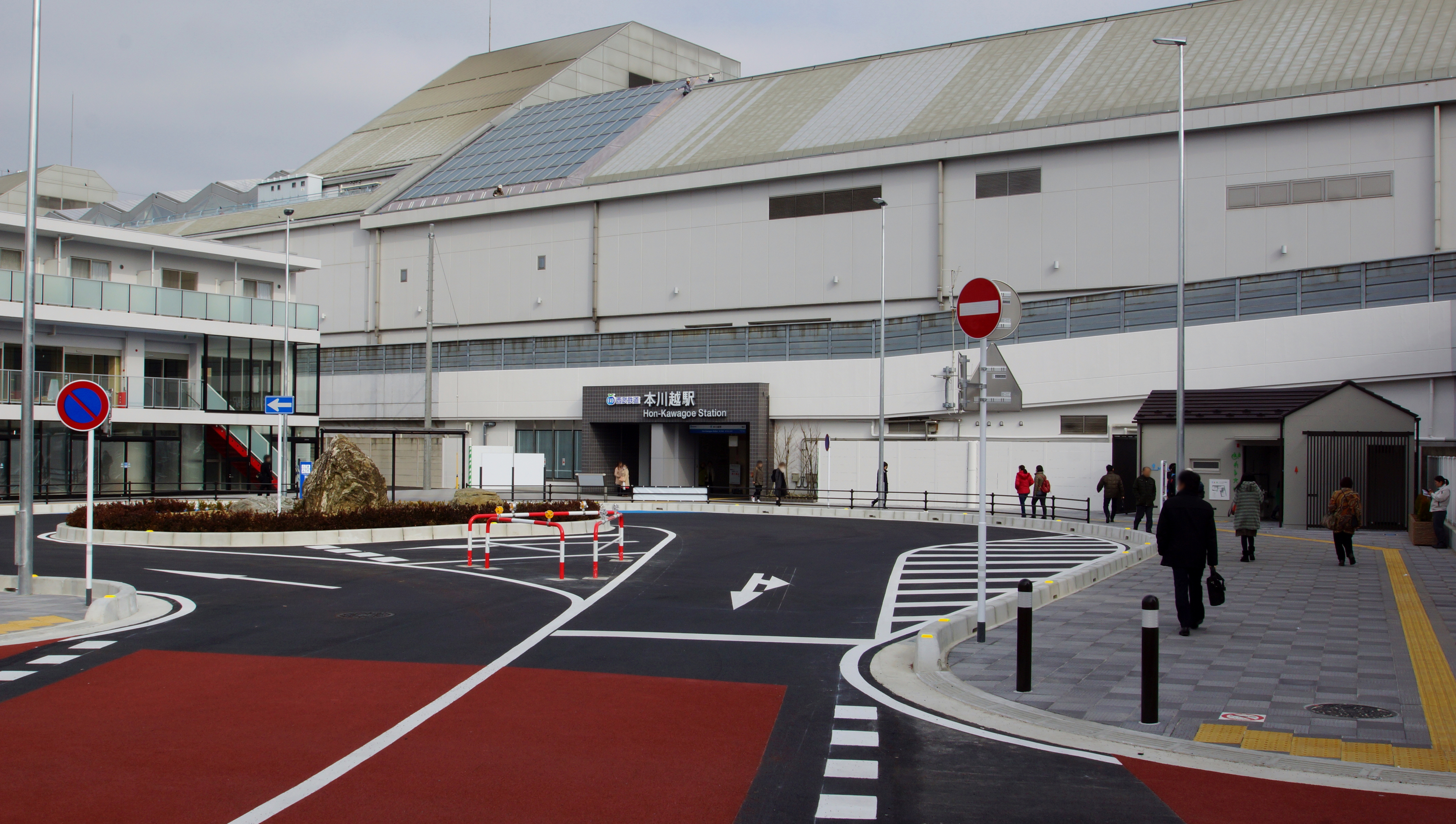
The west side of the station in February 2016

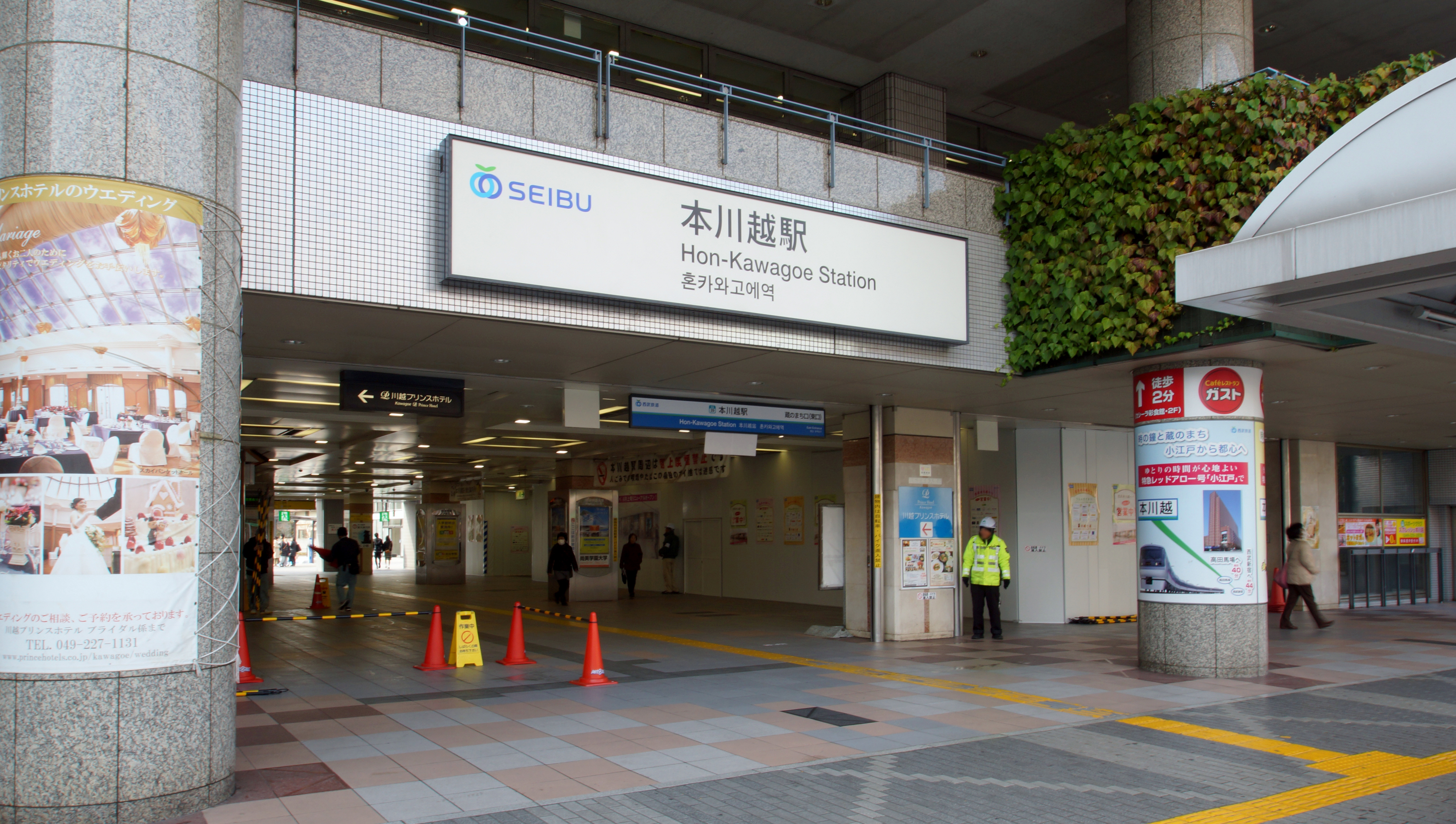
The east entrance in February 2016

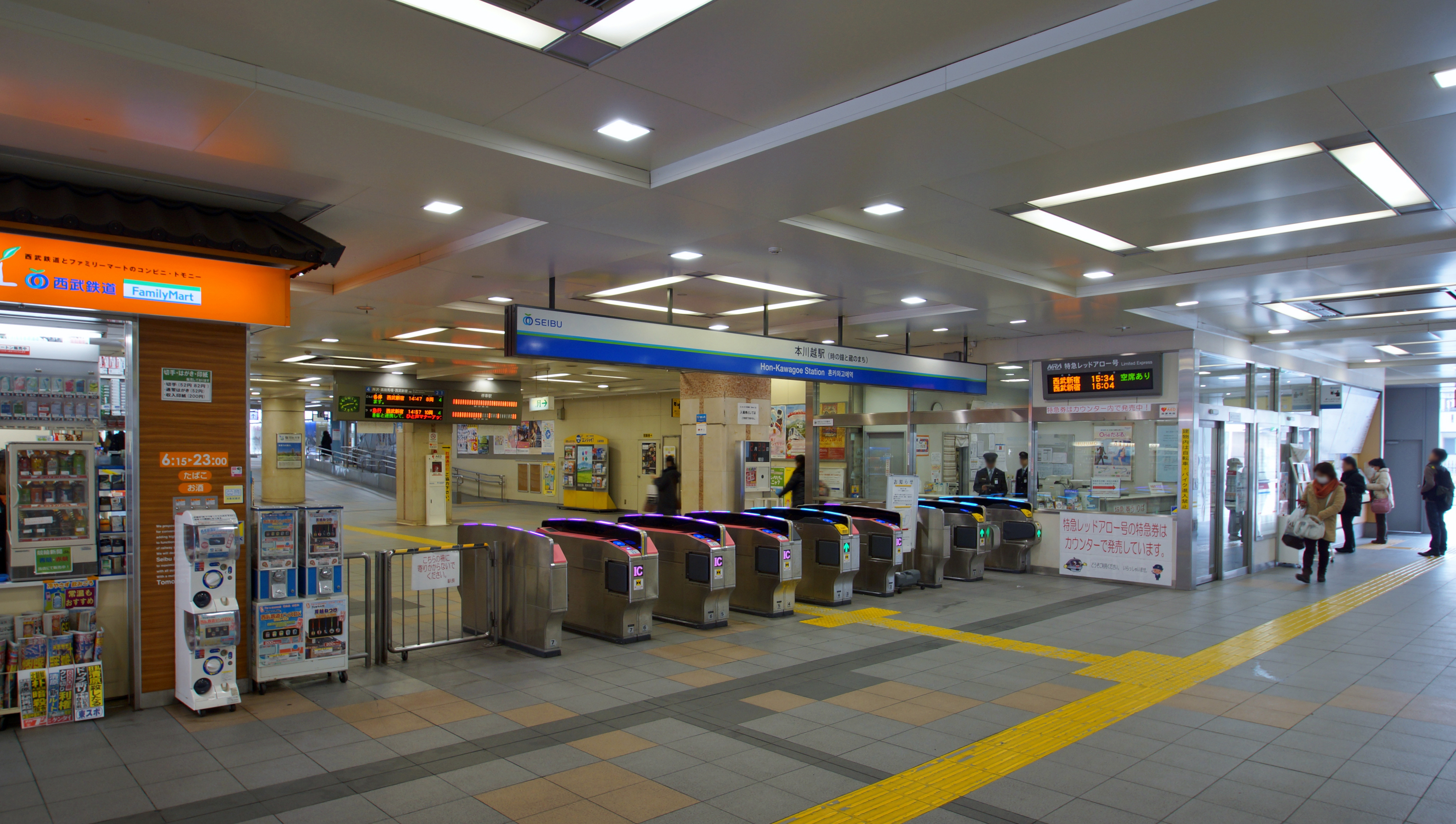
The ground-floor ticket barriers in February 2016

=== Platforms ===
| 1/2 | Seibu Shinjuku Line | for Tokorozawa, Takadanobaba and Seibu-Shinjuku |
| 3 | Seibu Shinjuku Line | Arrivals only |
| 4 | Seibu Shinjuku Line | for Tokorozawa, Takadanobaba and Seibu-Shinjuku |

Platforms 2 and 3 share the same track. "Koedo" Limited Express trains stop on Platform 2.

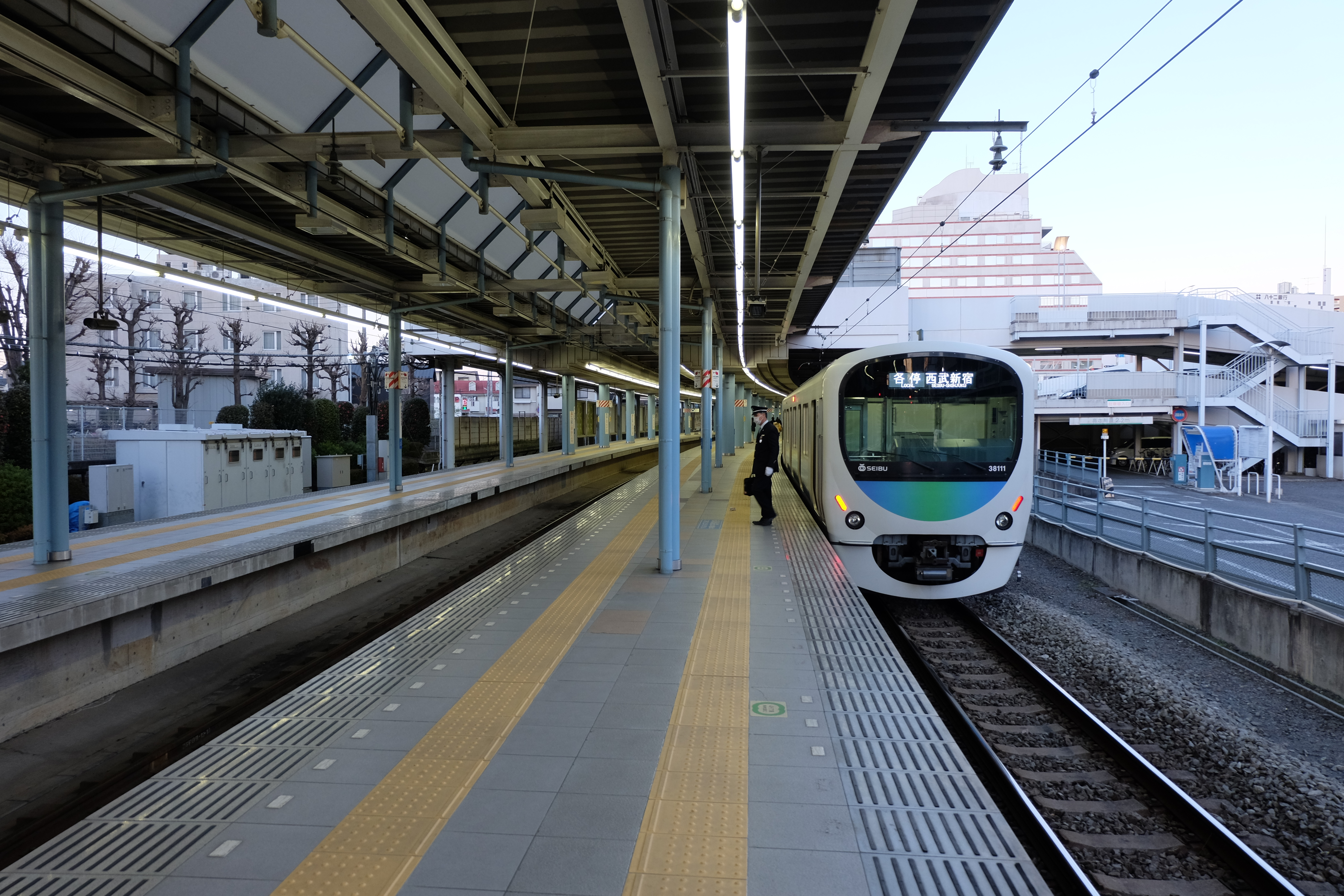
The view from the end of the platforms

== History ==
The station opened as Kawagoe Station on the Kawagoe Railway on March 21, 1895. The station name was changed to the present name on July 22, 1940, following the opening of Kawagoe Station on the Kawagoe Line of Japanese Government Railways. On October 20, 2012 the station acquired the secondary name Toki no Kane to Kura no Machi (時の鐘と蔵のまち) in order to encourage more tourists to visit the area. The name is a reference to the nearby 19th-century clock tower and storehouses.

Station numbering was introduced on all Seibu Railway lines during fiscal 2012, with Hon-Kawagoe Station becoming "SS29".

A new entrance opened on the west side of the station on 20 February 2016, providing easier access for passengers transferring to and from Kawagoeshi Station on the Tobu Tojo Line. From this date, the original main entrance became the "East Entrance".

== Passenger statistics ==
In fiscal 2019, the station was the 18th busiest on the Seibu network with an average of 53,230 passengers daily. The passenger figures for previous years are as shown below.

| Fiscal year | Daily average |
|---|---|
| 2005 | 47,492 |
| 2010 | 47,680 |
| 2015 | 49,266 |

== Surrounding area ==
=== Station building ===
- Pepe department store
- Kawagoe Prince Hotel

=== Stations ===
- Kawagoeshi Station (Tōbu Tōjō Line)
- Kawagoe Station (Tōbu Tōjō Line/JR Kawagoe Line)

=== Civic/culture ===
- Kawagoe City Office
- Kawagoe City Museum
- Kawagoe City Art Gallery
- Kita-in Temple
- Hikawa Shrine
- Renkeiji Temple

=== Education ===
- Saitama Prefectural Girls' High School
- Saitama Prefectural Kawagoe High School
- Yamamura Gakuen High School
- Hoshino Gakuen High School & Junior High School
- Kawagoe Technical High School

=== Other ===
- National Route 254

== Bus services ==
The following long-distance express bus services operate from the south side of the station.

- Haneda Airport, operated by Airport Transport Service (Limousine Bus) and Seibu Bus
- Tokyo Disney Resort, operated jointly by Tokyo Bay City Bus and Tobu Bus West

== See also ==
- List of railway stations in Japan
