= Seibu-Shinjuku Station =

Railway station in Tokyo, Japan

Coordinates: 35.695827°N 139.700014°E

SS01 Seibu-Shinjuku Station 西武新宿駅
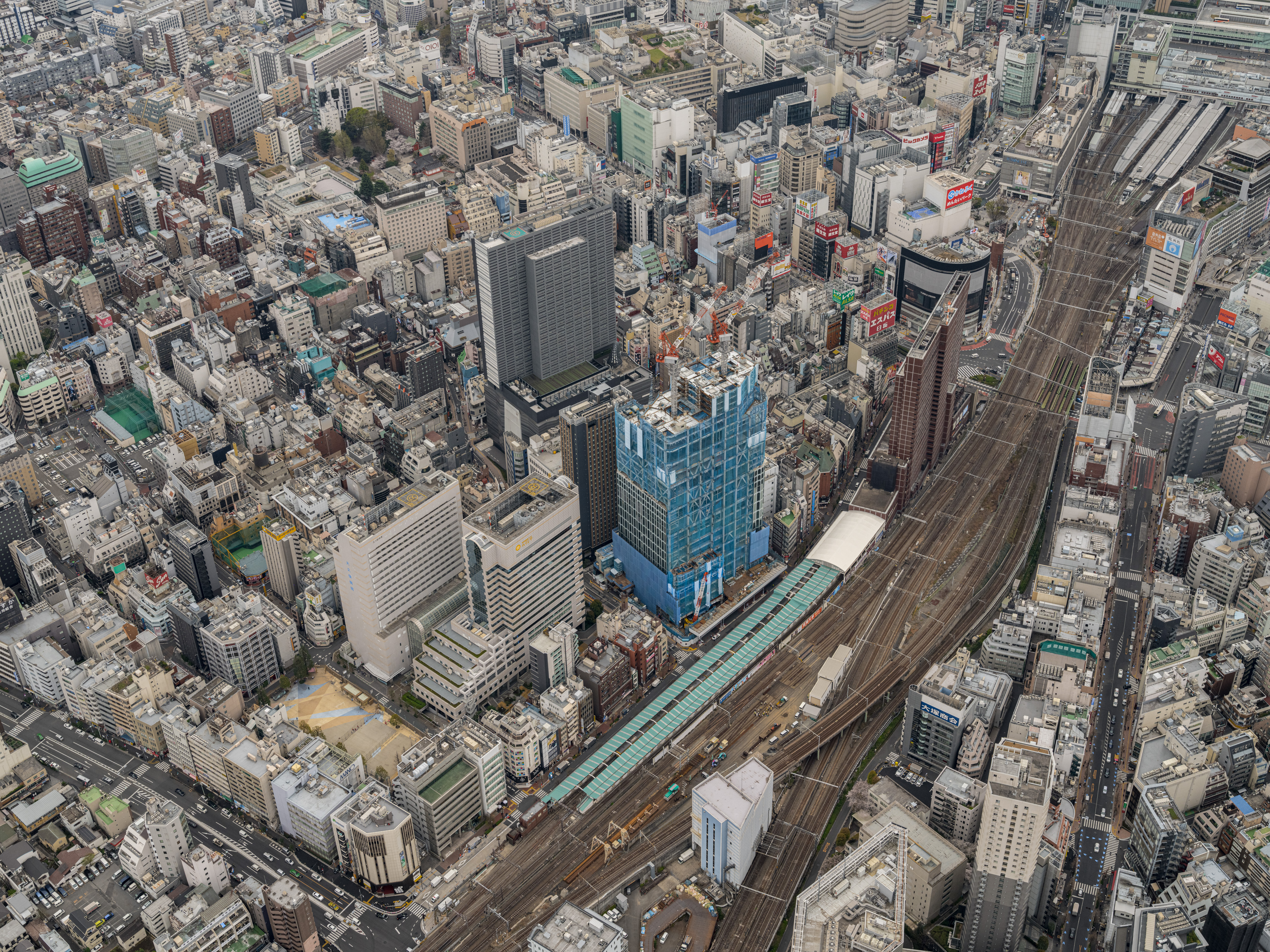
- The Seibu-Shinjuku Station, 2021

General information
- Location: 1-30-1 Kabukichō, Shinjuku, Tokyo （東京都新宿区歌舞伎町1-30-1） Japan
- Operator: Seibu Railway
- Line: Seibu Shinjuku Line
- Tracks: 3
- Connections: Shinjuku; Shinjuku-nishiguchi

Other information
- Station code: SS01

History
- Opened: 25 March 1952; 74 years ago

Passengers
- FY2013: 175,244 daily

Services
Preceding station	Seibu Railway	Following station
Takadanobaba SS02 towards Hon-Kawagoe	Koedo	Terminus
Takadanobaba SS02 towards Haijima	Haijima Liner	Terminus
Takadanobaba SS02 towards Hon-Kawagoe	Shinjuku Line Rapid Express Commuter Express Express Semi Express Local	Terminus
Location
- Location within Special wards of Tokyo Location within Tokyo Bay and Bōsō Peninsula Location within Tokyo Location within Kanto Area Location within Japan

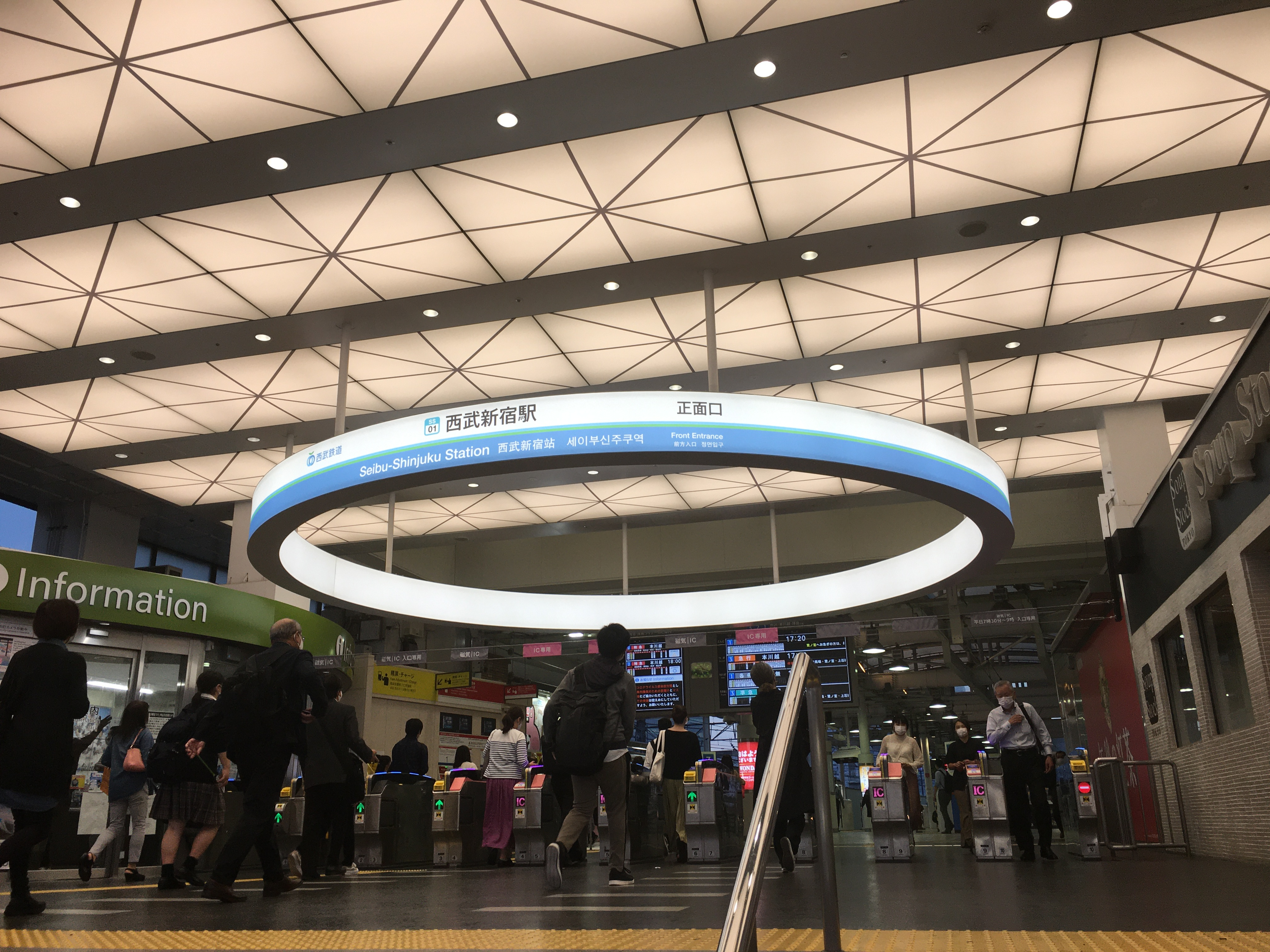
Station ticket gates, 2020

Seibu-Shinjuku Station (西武新宿駅, Seibu-Shinjuku-eki) is a railway station in Shinjuku, Tokyo, Japan, operated by the private railway operator Seibu Railway. It is the terminus of the 47.5 km (30 mile) Seibu Shinjuku Line, which extends to Hon-Kawagoe in Saitama Prefecture.

The station is located approximately 420 meters (460 yards) by foot from Shinjuku Station. It is part of the Shinjuku Prince Hotel and Seibu Shinjuku PePe shopping complex, with the ticket machines and platforms located on the second-floor level. The main entrance is located at the southern end, and a smaller "North entrance" is located at the north end of the station.

== Station layout ==
The station has three elevated platforms serving three tracks. Platform 1 is normally used for all-stations "Local" services, platform 2 is normally used for "Limited Express", "Haijima Liner", and "Rapid Express" services, and platform 3 is normally used for "Express" and "Semi-Express" services.

=== Platforms ===
1-3	Seibu Shinjuku Line	for Tanashi, Tokorozawa, Haijima, and Hon-Kawagoe

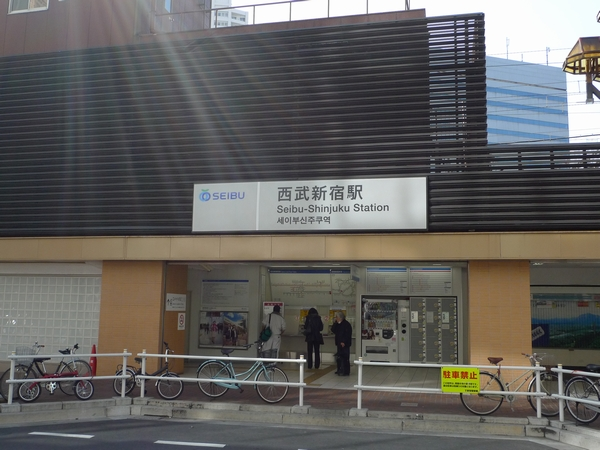
North exit, March 2011

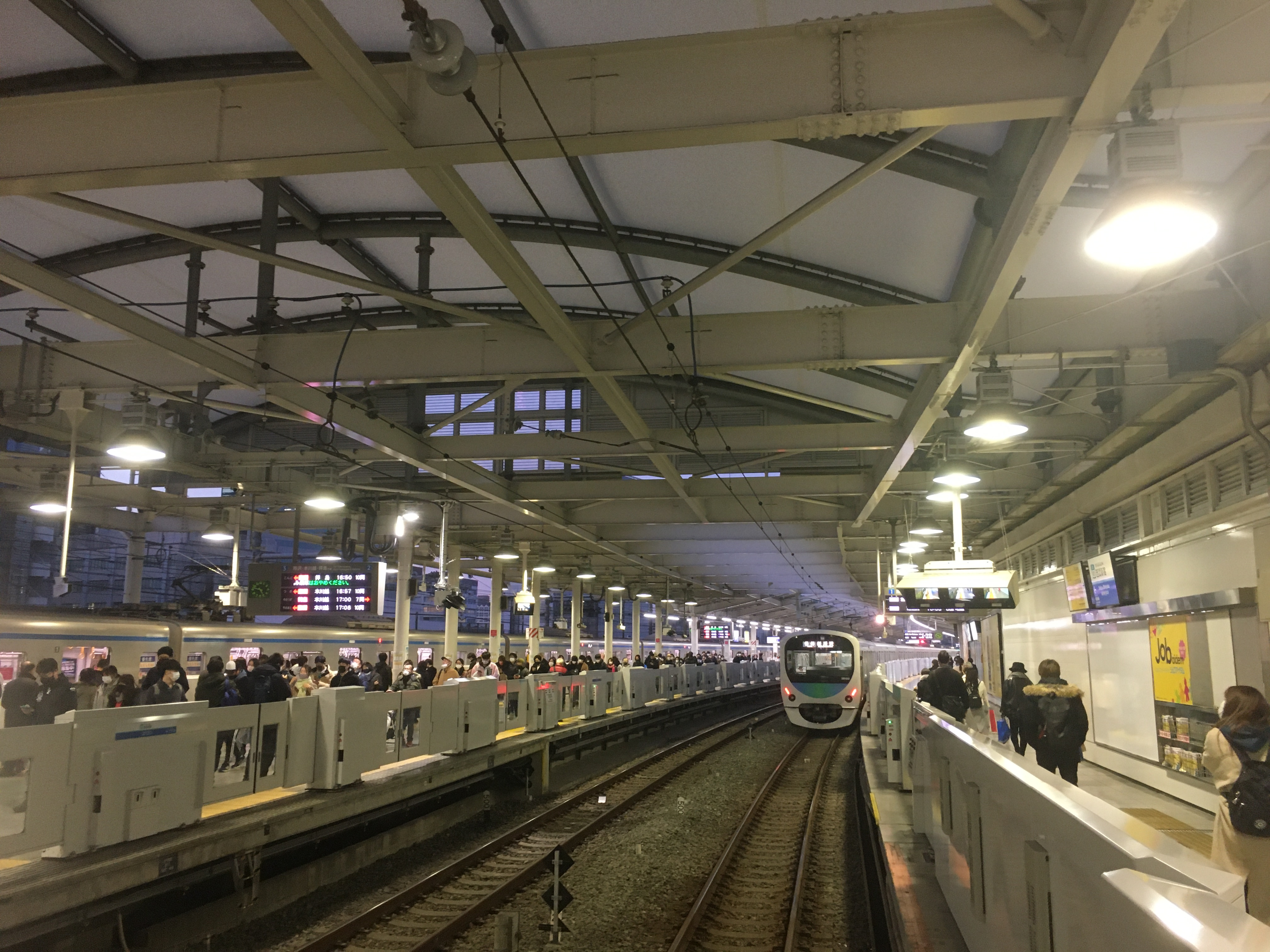
View from platform, 29 December 2021

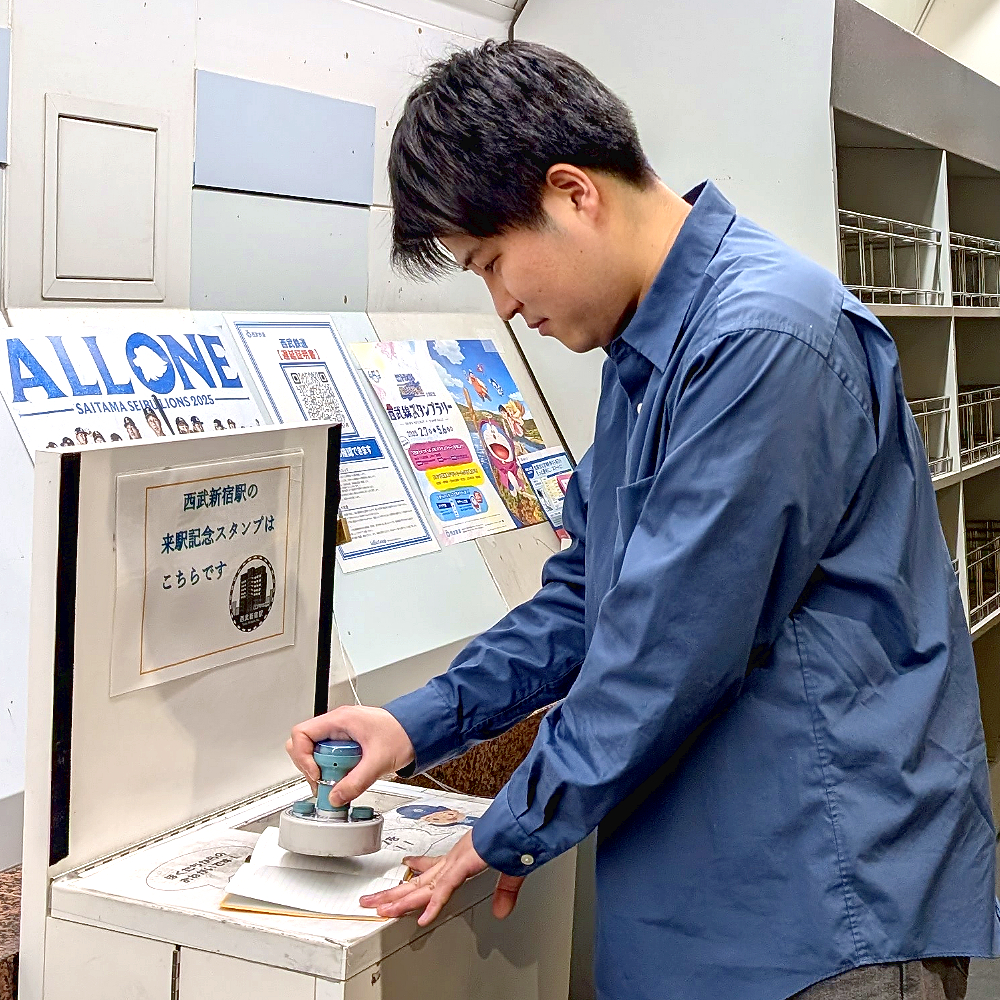
Man stamping Eki stamp in front of ticket counter

== History ==
The station opened on March 25, 1952, when the Seibu Shinjuku Line was extended south from Takadanobaba Station. It was initially intended to be a temporary station until the line could be extended all the way to Shinjuku Station. Seibu planned to use right-of-way south of Seibu-Shinjuku Station which had originally been used for a streetcar line connecting Shinjuku to Ogikubo. In the late 1950s and early 1960s, Seibu planned to extend the line to a new terminal on the second floor of the building now known as Lumine Est on the east side of Shinjuku Station, but this plan was eventually scrapped due to insufficient space to handle trains longer than six cars. The modern 25-story station building was completed in 1977, effectively ending all plans to extend the line to Shinjuku Station.

In the late 1980s, Seibu drew up a plan to build a 12.8 km (8.0-mile) underground line for express trains between Seibu-Shinjuku and Kami-Shakujii, following the existing line but stopping only at Takadanobaba. The plan called for a new underground station between Seibu-Shinjuku and the Metro Promenade. The plan was postponed indefinitely in 1995 due to costs (an initial estimate of 160 billion yen ballooned to 300 billion yen) and a decline in passenger ridership versus previous projections. Seibu was also a bidder to acquire the former JR freight terminal site in 1989, where they planned to build a new underground terminal; Takashimaya won the bid and constructed the Takashimaya Times Square complex on the site.

Station numbering was introduced on all Seibu Railway lines during fiscal 2012, with Seibu-Shinjuku Station becoming "SS01".

In 2023, automated translation on transparent display was tested at the help desk.

== Passenger statistics ==
In fiscal 2013, the station was the third busiest on the Seibu network with an average of 175,244 passengers daily.

The passenger figures for previous years are as shown below.

Fiscal year	Daily average
2000	201,444
2009	179,766
2010	173,328
2011	170,822
2012	172,907
2013	175,244

== Surrounding area ==
The station is located adjacent to the Kabukichō entertainment district in Shinjuku. It lies approximately 500 m north of the main Shinjuku Station complex, and is connected via the "Subnade" underground shopping street.

It is also adjacent to the Shinjuku-nishiguchi Station on the Oedo Line.

Other points of interest in the vicinity include:

- Shinjuku Ward Office
- Shinjuku Golden Gai
- Hanazono Shrine
- Shinjuku-Nishiguchi Station (Toei Oedo Line)
- Nishi-Shinjuku Station (Tokyo Metro Marunouchi Line)
- Ohkubo Hospital
