= Higashi-Fushimi Station =

Railway station in Nishitōkyō, Tokyo, Japan

SS15 Higashi-Fushimi Station 東伏見駅
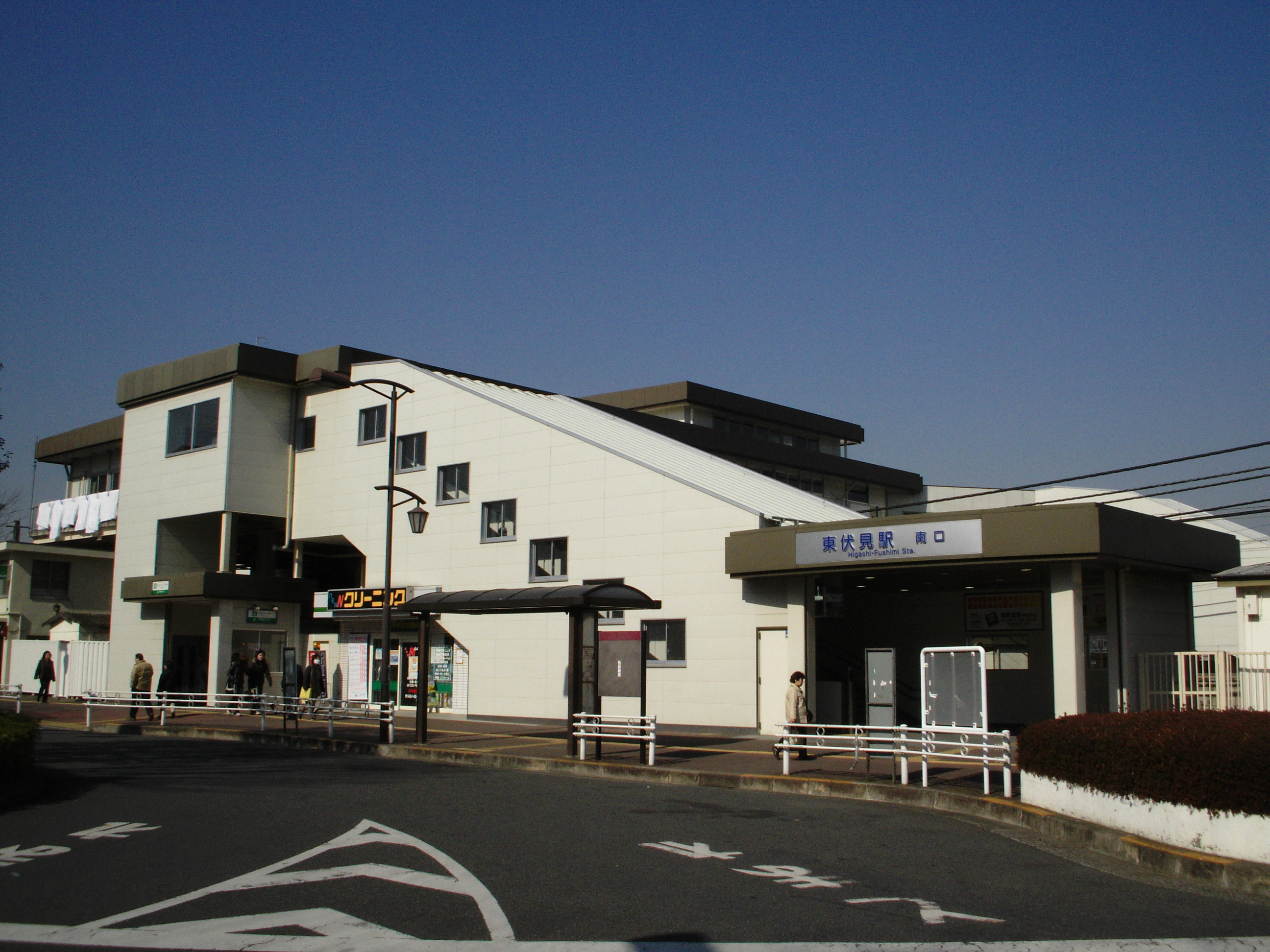
- Higashi-Fushimi Station building, February 2007

General information
- Location: 2-5-1 Higashifushimi-cho-chō, Nishitōkyō-shi, Tokyo-to 202-0021; Japan
- Coordinates: 35.7287°N 139.5642°E
- Operator: Seibu Railway
- Line: Seibu Shinjuku Line
- Distance: 15.3 km from Seibu-Shinjuku
- Platforms: 2 island platforms

Other information
- Station code: SS15
- Website: Official website

History
- Opened: 16 April 1927

Passengers
- FY2019: 24,951 daily

Services
Preceding station	Seibu Railway	Following station
Seibu-Yagisawa SS16 towards Hon-Kawagoe	Shinjuku Line Semi Express Local	Musashi-Seki SS14 towards Seibu-Shinjuku
Location
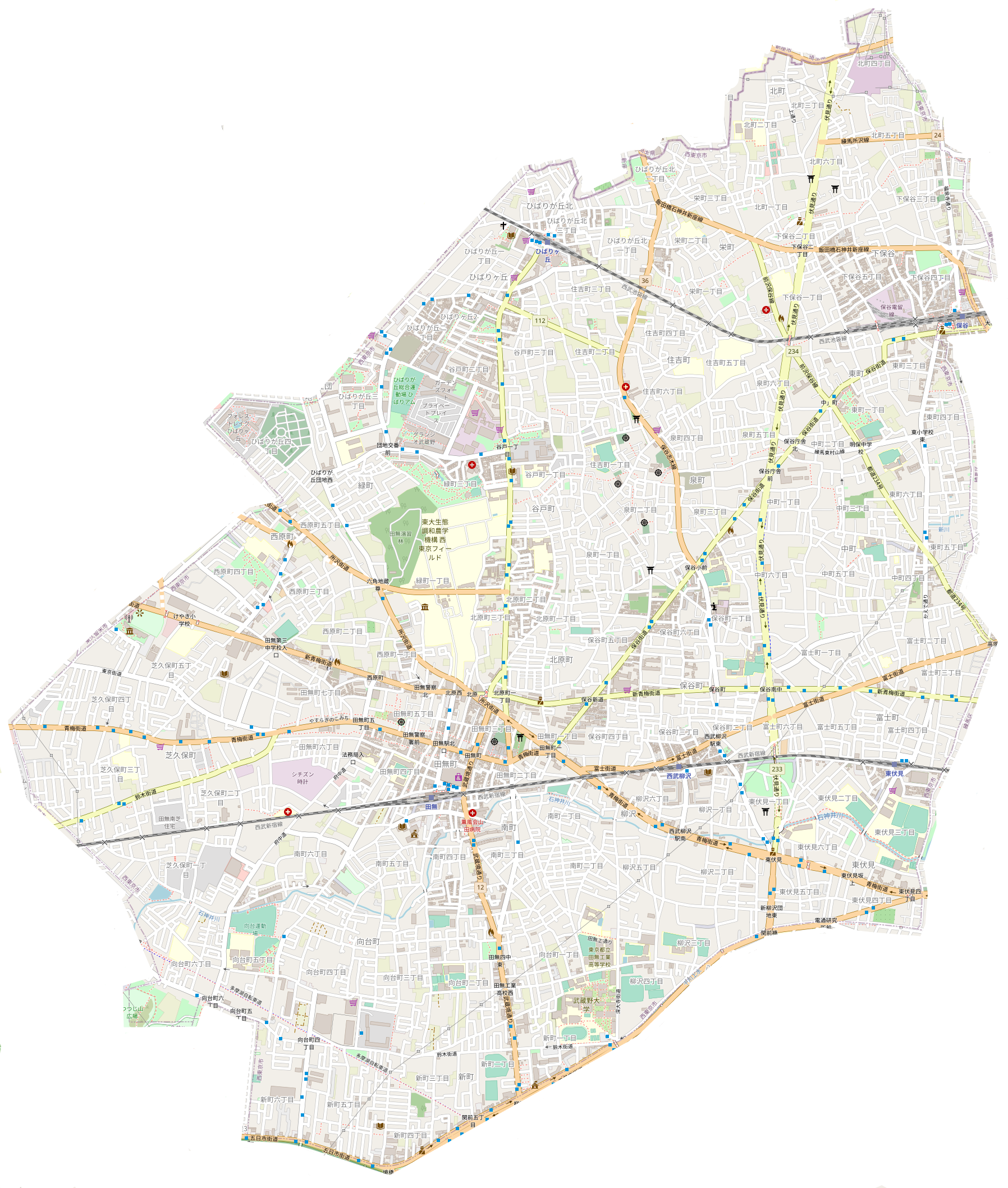
- Location within Nishitōkyō city Location within Tokyo Location within Japan

Higashi-Fushimi Station (東伏見駅, Higashi-Fushimi-eki) is a passenger railway station located in then city of Nishitōkyō, Tokyo, Japan, operated by the private railway operator Seibu Railway.

== Lines ==
Higashi-Fushimi Station is served by the 47.5 km Seibu Shinjuku Line from Seibu-Shinjuku in Tokyo to Hon-Kawagoe in Saitama Prefecture. It is 15.3 kilometers from the terminus of the line at Seibu-Shinjuku Station.

== Station layout ==
The station has two elevated island platforms serving four tracks, with the station building located above and perpendicular to the platforms.

=== Platforms ===
1/2	Seibu Shinjuku Line	for Tanashi, Tokorozawa, Haijima, and Hon-Kawagoe
3/4	Seibu Shinjuku Line	for Kami-Shakujii, Takadanobaba, and Seibu-Shinjuku

== History ==
Higashi-Fushimi Station opened on 16 April 1927. Station numbering was introduced on all Seibu Railway lines during fiscal 2012, with Higashi-Fushimi Station becoming "SS15".

== Passenger statistics ==
In fiscal 2019, the station was the 44th busiest on the Seibu network with an average of 24,951 passengers daily.

The passenger figures for previous years are as shown below.

Fiscal year	Daily average
2000	21,633
2005	23,659
2010	24,286
2015	24,597

== Surrounding area ==
- Nishitokyo City Higashifushimi Fureai Plaza
- Shin-Oume Kaido (Tokyo Metropolitan Road No. 245 Suginamida Radio)
- Fuji Kaido (Tokyo Metropolitan Road No. 8 Chiyoda Neri Mada Radio)
- Higashi Fushimi Inari Shrine-
- Musashiseki Park
- DyDo Drinco Ice Arena

== See also ==
- List of railway stations in Japan
