= Kumegawa Station =

Railway station in Higashimurayama, Tokyo, Japan

SS20 Kumegawa Station 久米川駅
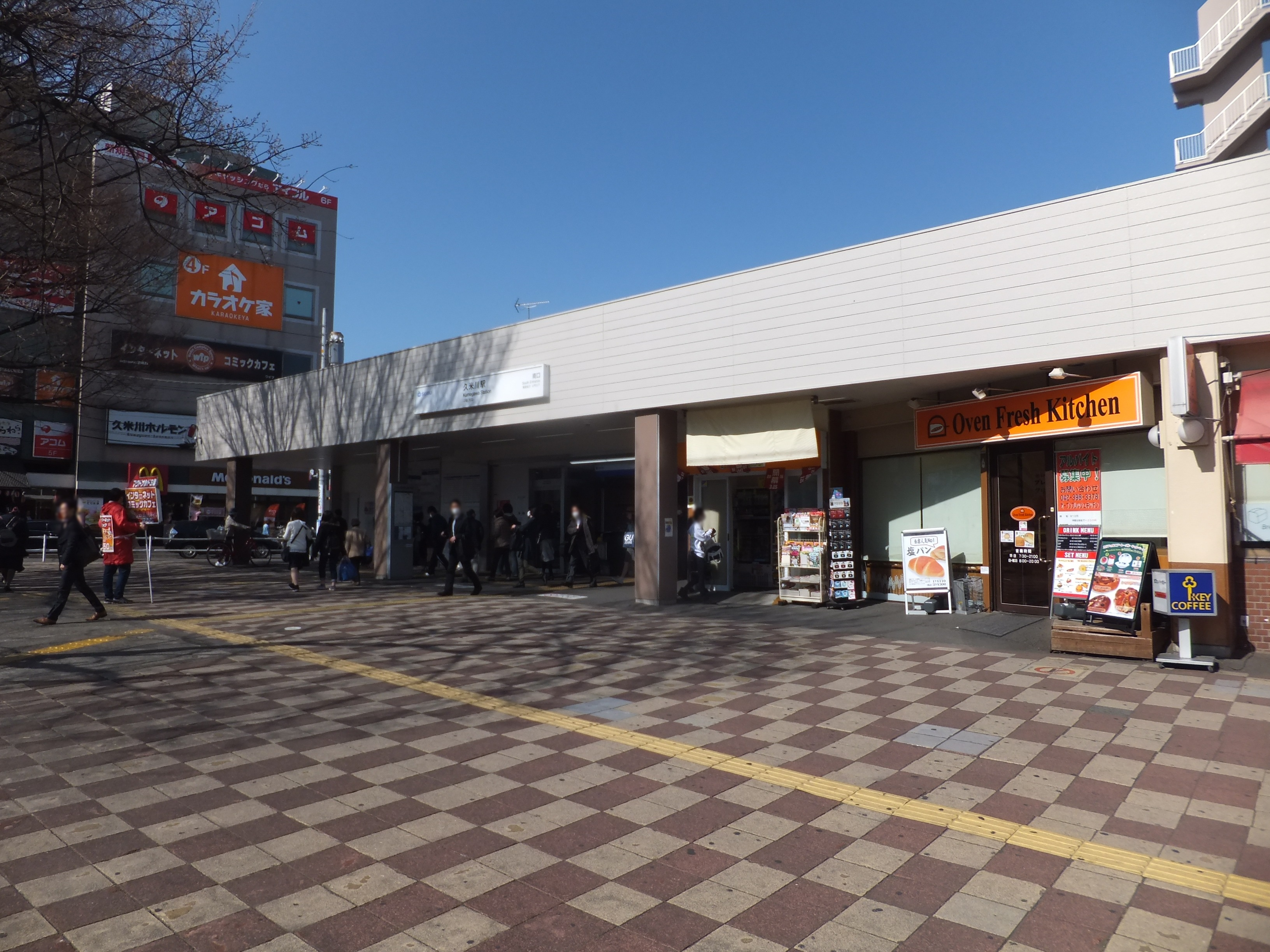
- Kumegawa Station south entrance, March 2016

General information
- Location: 2-3-1 Sakai-cho, Higashimurayama-shi, Tokyo 189-0013; Japan
- Coordinates: 35.7495°N 139.4729°E
- Operator: Seibu Railway
- Line: Seibu Shinjuku Line
- Distance: 24.6 km from Seibu-Shinjuku
- Platforms: 2 side platforms
- Connections: Bus terminal

Other information
- Station code: SS20
- Website: Official website

History
- Opened: 16 April 1927

Passengers
- FY2019: 32,638

Services
Preceding station	Seibu Railway	Following station
Higashi-Murayama SS21 towards Hon-Kawagoe	Shinjuku Line Express Semi Express Local	Kodaira SS19 towards Seibu-Shinjuku
Location
- Location within Tokyo Location within Japan

Kumegawa Station (久米川, Kumegawa-eki) is a passenger railway station located in the city of Higashimurayama, Tokyo, Japan, operated by the private railway operator Seibu Railway.

== Lines ==
Kumegawa Station is served by the 47.5 km Seibu Shinjuku Line from Seibu-Shinjuku in Tokyo to Hon-Kawagoe in Saitama Prefecture. From Kumegawa, it takes 28–40 minutes to travel the 24.6 km to the Seibu-Shinjuku terminus in central Tokyo.

== Station layout ==
The tracks at Kumegawa run east to west and there two opposed side platforms, serving two tracks, connected by a footbridge.

=== Platforms ===
1	Seibu Shinjuku Line	for Tokorozawa and Hon-Kawagoe
2	Seibu Shinjuku Line	for Tanashi, Takadanobaba, and Seibu Shinjuku

== History ==
The station opened on 16 April 1927.

Station numbering was introduced on all Seibu Railway lines during fiscal 2012, with Kumegawa Station becoming "SS20".

== Passenger statistics ==
In fiscal 2019, the station was the 31st busiest on the Seibu network with an average of 32,638 passengers daily.

The passenger figures for previous years are as shown below.

Fiscal year	Daily average
2005	32,875
2010	32,767
2015	32,195

== Surrounding area ==
Bus stops are located at the south exit to the station, along with numerous restaurants and a Seiyu department store. The north side of the station is currently under redevelopment and is due to be officially opened in March 2009, although part of this, a new underground cycle park, previously opened on 1 June 2009.

== See also ==
- List of railway stations in Japan
