= Minami-Ōtsuka Station =

Railway station in Kawagoe, Saitama Prefecture, Japan

SS28 Minami-Ōtsuka Station 南大塚駅
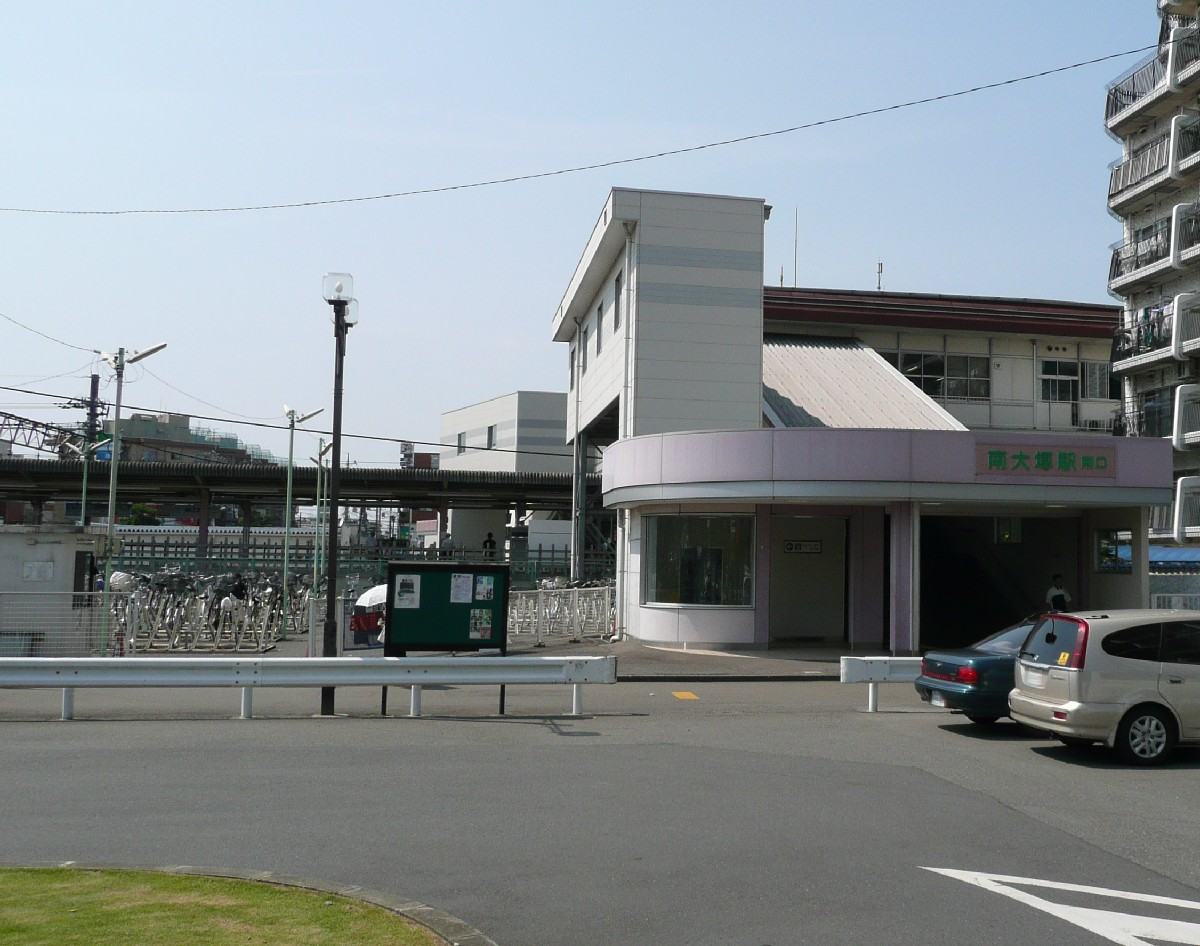
- Minami-Ōtsuka Station south exit, July 2008

General information
- Location: 3–14 Minamidai, Kawagoe-shi, Saitama-ken 350–1165; Japan
- Coordinates: 35°53′23″N 139°27′14″E
- Operator: Seibu Railway
- Line: Seibu Shinjuku Line
- Distance: 43.9 km from Seibu-Shinjuku
- Platforms: 2 side platforms

Other information
- Station code: SS28
- Website: Official website

History
- Opened: 14 November 1897

Passengers
- FY2019: 16,937 (Daily)

Services
Preceding station	Seibu Railway	Following station
Hon-Kawagoe SS29 Terminus	Shinjuku Line Rapid Express	Shin-Sayama One-way operation
Hon-Kawagoe SS29 Terminus	Shinjuku Line Express Semi Express Local	Shin-Sayama SS27 towards Seibu-Shinjuku
Location
- Location within Saitama Prefecture Location within Japan

Minami-Ōtsuka Station (南大塚駅, Minami-Ōtsuka-eki) is a passenger railway station located in the city of Kawagoe, Saitama, Japan, operated by the private railway operator Seibu Railway.

== Lines ==
Minami-Ōtsuka Station is served by the Seibu Shinjuku Line between Seibu Shinjuku Station in Tokyo and Hon-Kawagoe Station in Kawagoe, and is located 43.9 km from the Seibu Shinjuku terminus.

== Layout ==
The station consists of two side platforms serving two tracks.

=== Platforms ===
1	Seibu Shinjuku Line	for Tokorozawa, Takadanobaba, and Seibu-Shinjuku
2	Seibu Shinjuku Line	for Hon-Kawagoe

== History ==
The station opened on 14 November 1897.

Station numbering was introduced on all Seibu Railway lines during fiscal 2012, with Minami-Ōtsuka Station becoming "SS28".

== Passenger statistics ==
In fiscal 2019, the station was the 57th busiest on the Seibu network with an average of 16,937 passengers daily.

The passenger figures for previous years are as shown below.

Fiscal year	Daily average
2005	15,568
2010	15,487
2015	16,054

== Surrounding area ==
- Saitama Prefectural Kawagoe Minami High School
- Kan-Etsu Expressway
- National Route 16

== See also ==
- List of railway stations in Japan
