= Hana-Koganei Station =

Railway station in Kodaira, Tokyo, Japan

SS18 Hana-Koganei Station 花小金井駅
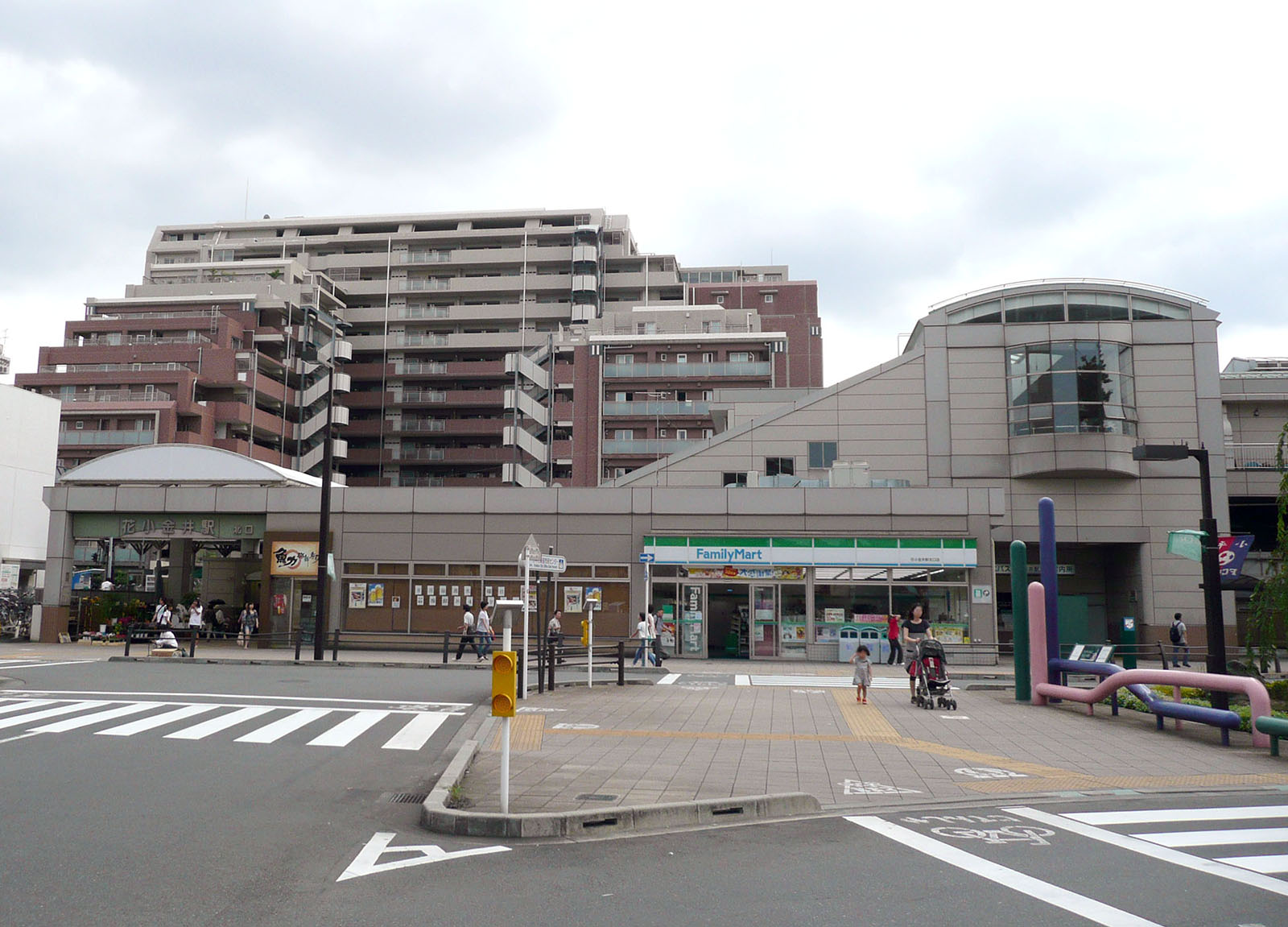
- Hana-Koganei Station, October 2011

General information
- Location: 1-10-5 Hanakoganei, Kodaira-shi, Tokyo 187-0003; Japan
- Coordinates: 35.7263°N 139.5133°E
- Operator: Seibu Railway
- Line: Seibu Shinjuku Line
- Distance: 19.9 km from Seibu-Shinjuku
- Platforms: 1 island platform

Other information
- Station code: SS18
- Website: Official website

History
- Opened: April 16, 1927

Passengers
- FY 2019: 59,220 daily

Services
Preceding station	Seibu Railway	Following station
Kodaira SS19 towards Hon-Kawagoe	Shinjuku Line Express Semi Express Local	Tanashi SS17 towards Seibu-Shinjuku
Location
- Location within Tokyo Location within Japan

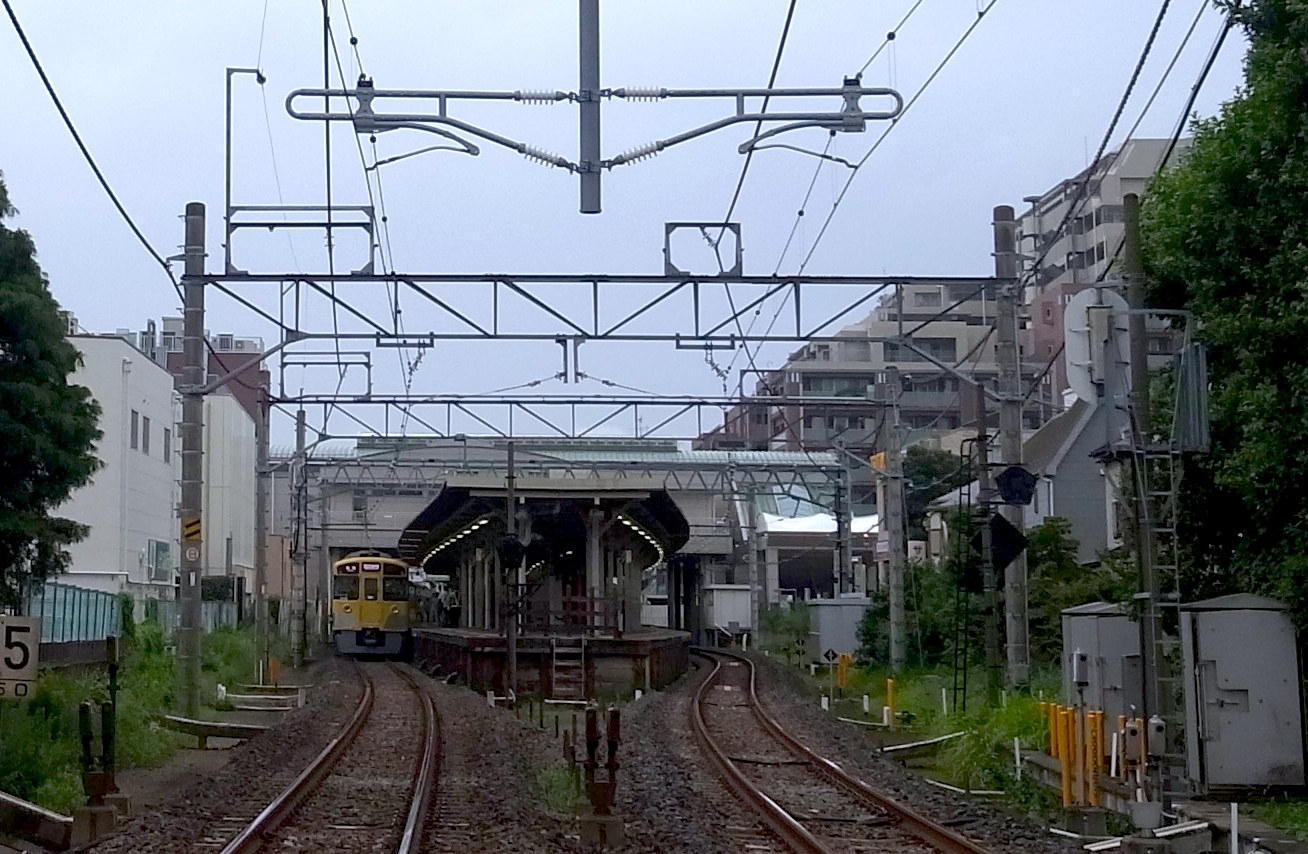
Station with the platforms and a train on one side of the platform, 2014

Hana-Koganei Station (花小金井駅, Hana-Koganei-eki) is a passenger railway station located in the city of Kodaira, Tokyo, Japan, operated by the private railway operator Seibu Railway. Located near the border of Kodaira with Higashikurume and Nishitokyo, the station serves passengers from all three municipalities.

== Lines ==
Hana-Koganei Station is served by the 47.5 km Seibu Shinjuku Line from Seibu-Shinjuku in Tokyo to Hon-Kawagoe in Saitama Prefecture. It is located 19.9 kilometers from the terminus of the line at Seibu-Shinjuku.

== Station layout ==
The station consists of one island platform serving two tracks, with an elevated station building above and at a right angle to the platforms.

=== Platforms ===
1	Seibu Shinjuku Line	for Tanashi, Takadanobaba, and Seibu Shinjuku
2	Seibu Shinjuku Line	for Tokorozawa, Hon-Kawagoe and Haijima

== History ==
The station opened on April 16, 1927. Station numbering was introduced on all Seibu Railway lines during fiscal 2012, with Hana-Koganei Station becoming "SS18".

== Passenger statistics ==
In fiscal 2019, the station was the 15th busiest on the Seibu network with an average of 59,220 passengers daily.

The passenger figures for previous years are as shown below.

Fiscal year	Daily average
2005	51,189
2010	52,242
2015	55,538

== Surrounding area ==
- Koganei Park

== See also ==
- List of railway stations in Japan
