= Shimo-Ochiai Station =

Railway station in Tokyo, Japan

Coordinates: 35.7161°N 139.6955°E

SS03 Shimo-Ochiai Station 下落合駅
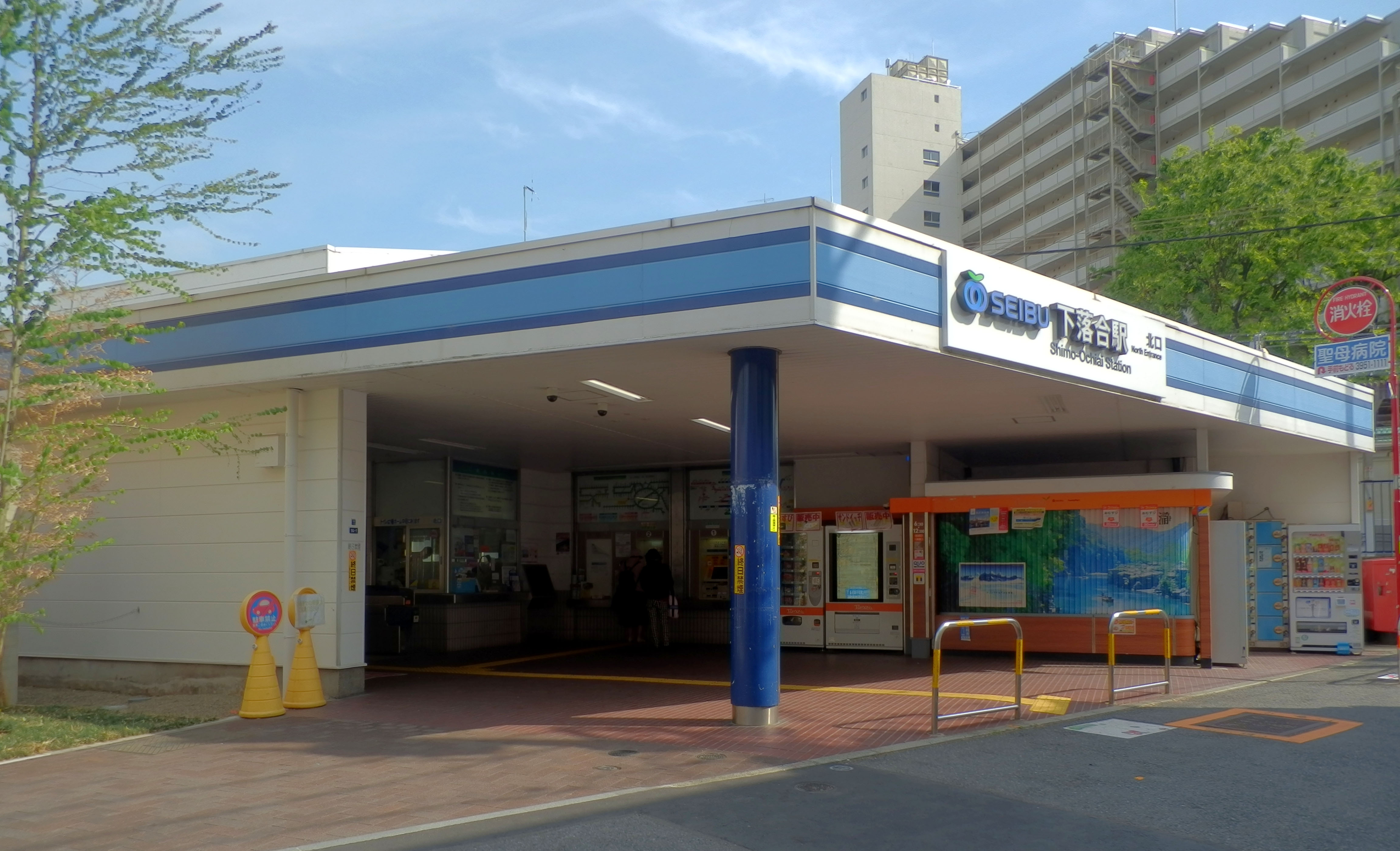
- Station entrance, 2013

General information
- Location: 1-16-1 Shimo-Ochiai, Shinjuku, Tokyo （東京都新宿区下落合1-16-1） Japan
- Operator: Seibu Railway
- Line: Seibu Shinjuku Line
- Connections: Bus stop

Other information
- Station code: SS03

History
- Opened: 16 April 1927

Passengers
- FY2013: 11,221 daily

Services
| Preceding station | Seibu Railway | Following station |
|---|---|---|
| Nakai SS04 towards Hon-Kawagoe | Shinjuku Line Local | Takadanobaba SS02 towards Seibu-Shinjuku |
Location

Shimo-Ochiai Station (下落合駅, Shimo-Ochiai-eki) is a railway station on the Seibu Shinjuku Line in Shinjuku, Tokyo, Japan, operated by the private railway operator Seibu Railway.

== Lines ==
Shimo-Ochiai Station is served by the 47.5 km Seibu Shinjuku Line from Seibu-Shinjuku in Tokyo to Hon-Kawagoe in Saitama Prefecture. Located between Takadanobaba and Nakai, it is 3.2 km from the Seibu-Shinjuku terminus.

During the daytime off-peak, the station is served by six trains per hour in either direction.

== Station layout ==
The station consists of two ground-level side platforms serving two tracks.

=== Platforms ===
| 1 | Seibu Shinjuku Line | for Takadanobaba and Seibu-Shinjuku |
| 2 | Seibu Shinjuku Line | for Tanashi, Tokorozawa, Haijima, and Hon-Kawagoe |

== History ==
The station opened on 16 April 1927.

Station numbering was introduced on all Seibu Railway lines during fiscal 2012, with Shimo-Ochiai Station becoming "SS03".

== Passenger statistics ==
In fiscal 2013, the station was the 64th busiest on the Seibu network with an average of 11,221 passengers daily.

The passenger figures for previous years are as shown below.

| Fiscal year | Daily average |
|---|---|
| 2000 | 13,788 |
| 2009 | 10,976 |
| 2010 | 10,492 |
| 2011 | 10,752 |
| 2012 | 10,843 |
| 2013 | 11,221 |

== Surrounding area ==
- Tokyo Fuji University
- International Catholic Hospital
- Hikawa Shrine
- Otomeyama Park
- Kanda River
