= Shinjuku Line =

Shinjuku Line (新宿線, Shinjuku-sen) refers to several Japanese railway lines:

- Seibu Shinjuku Line, owned by Seibu Railway
- Toei Shinjuku Line, owned by Tokyo Metropolitan Bureau of Transportation

== See also ==
- Shōnan-Shinjuku Line, operated by JR East
