= Seibu-Yagisawa Station =

Railway station in Nishitōkyō, Tokyo, Japan

SS16 Seibu-Yagisawa Station 西武柳沢駅
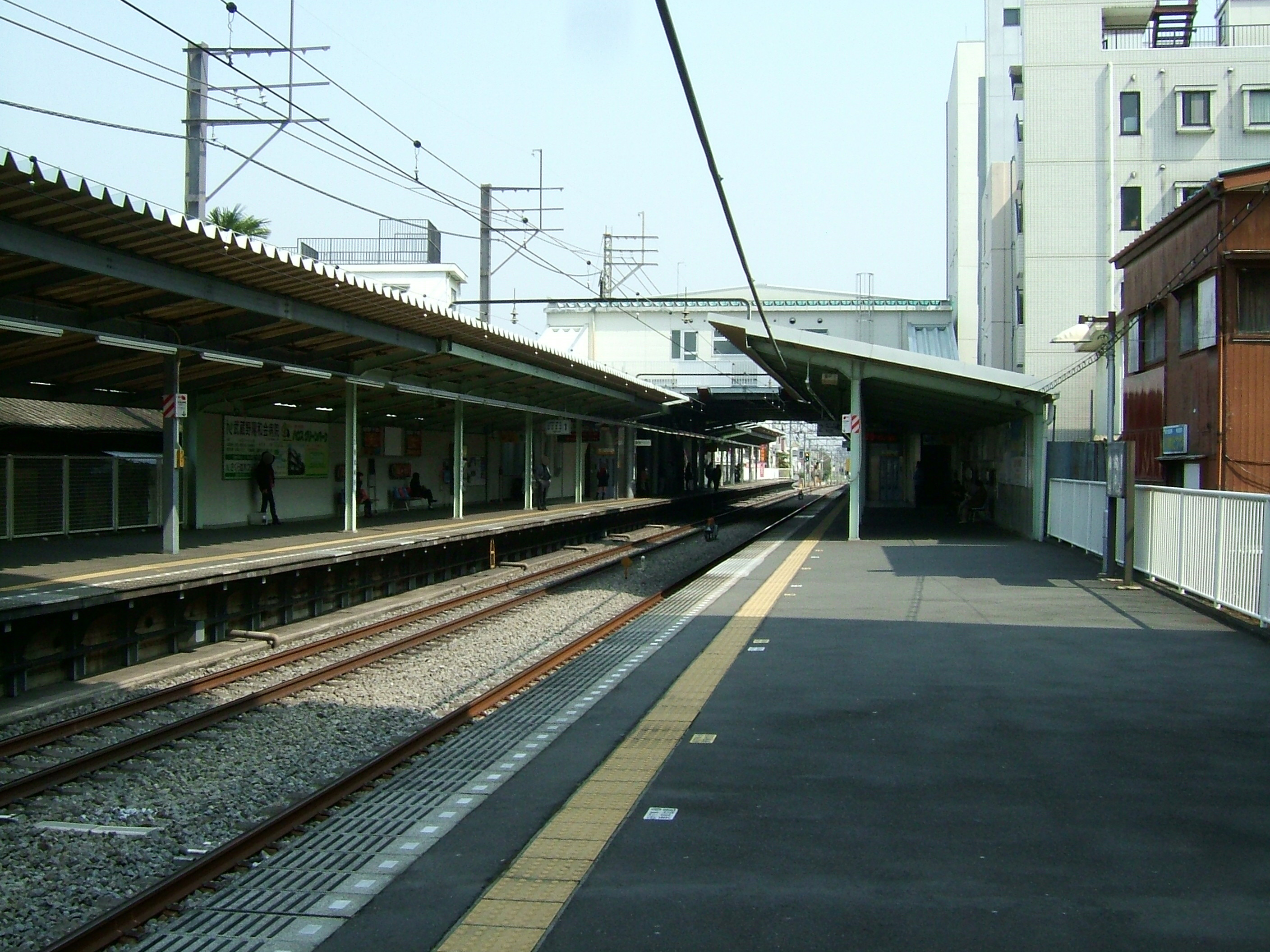
- Seibu-Yagisawa Station Platforms, March 2008

General information
- Location: 3-11-24 Hoyacho, Nishitōkyō-shi, Tokyo-to 202-0015; Japan
- Coordinates: 35.7286°N 139.553°E
- Operator: Seibu Railway
- Line: Seibu Shinjuku Line
- Distance: 16.3 from Seibu-Shinjuku
- Platforms: 2 side platforms

Other information
- Station code: SS16
- Website: Official website

History
- Opened: 16 April 1927

Passengers
- FY2019: 16,616 daily

Services
Preceding station	Seibu Railway	Following station
Tanashi SS17 towards Hon-Kawagoe	Shinjuku Line Semi Express Local	Higashi-Fushimi SS15 towards Seibu-Shinjuku
Location
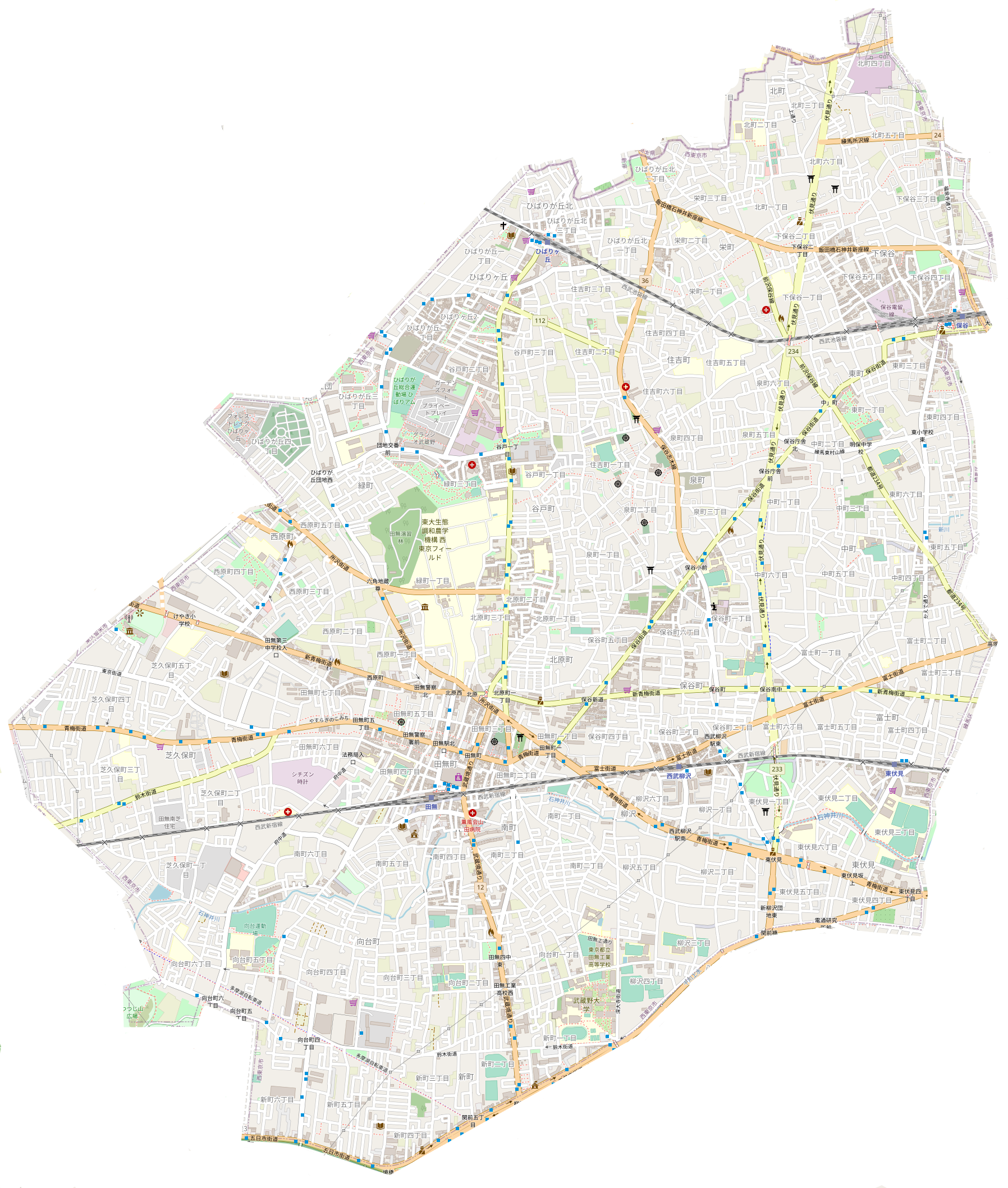
- Location within Nishitōkyō city Location within Tokyo Location within Japan

Seibu-Yagisawa Station (西武柳沢駅, Seibu-Yagisawa-eki) is a passenger railway station located in the city of Nishitōkyō, Tokyo, Japan, operated by the private railway operator Seibu Railway.

== Lines ==
Seibu-Yagisawa Station is served by the 47.5 km Seibu Shinjuku Line from Seibu-Shinjuku in Tokyo to Hon-Kawagoe in Saitama Prefecture. It is located 16.3 kilometers from the terminus of the line at Seibu-Shinjuku.

== Station layout ==
The station has two elevated opposed side platforms serving two tracks.

=== Platforms ===
1	Seibu Shinjuku Line	for Takadanobaba and Seibu-Shinjuku
2	Seibu Shinjuku Line	for Tokorozawa, Haijima, and Hon-Kawagoe

== History ==
Seibu-Yagisawa Station opened on 16 April 1927. Station numbering was introduced on all Seibu Railway lines during fiscal 2012, with Seibu-Yagisawa Station becoming "SS16".

== Passenger statistics ==
In fiscal 2019, the station was the 58th busiest on the Seibu network with an average of 16,616 passengers daily.

The passenger figures for previous years are as shown below.

Fiscal year	Daily average
2000	18,581
2005	17,282
2010	16,555
2015	16,383

== Surrounding area ==
- Fuji Kaido (Tokyo Metropolitan Road No. 8 Chiyoda Nerimada Radio)
- Ome Kaido (Tokyo Metropolitan Road No. 4 Tokyo Tokorozawa Line, Tokyo Metropolitan Road No. 5 Shinjuku Ome Line)
- Shin-Oume Kaido (Tokyo Metropolitan Road No. 245 Suginamida Radio)
- Yagisawa Library / Yagisawa Public Hall
- Nishitokyo City Fujicho Welfare Hall
- Higashifushimi Park

== See also ==
- List of railway stations in Japan
