= Seibu Shinjuku Line =

Railway line in Japan operated by Seibu Railway

Shinjuku Line

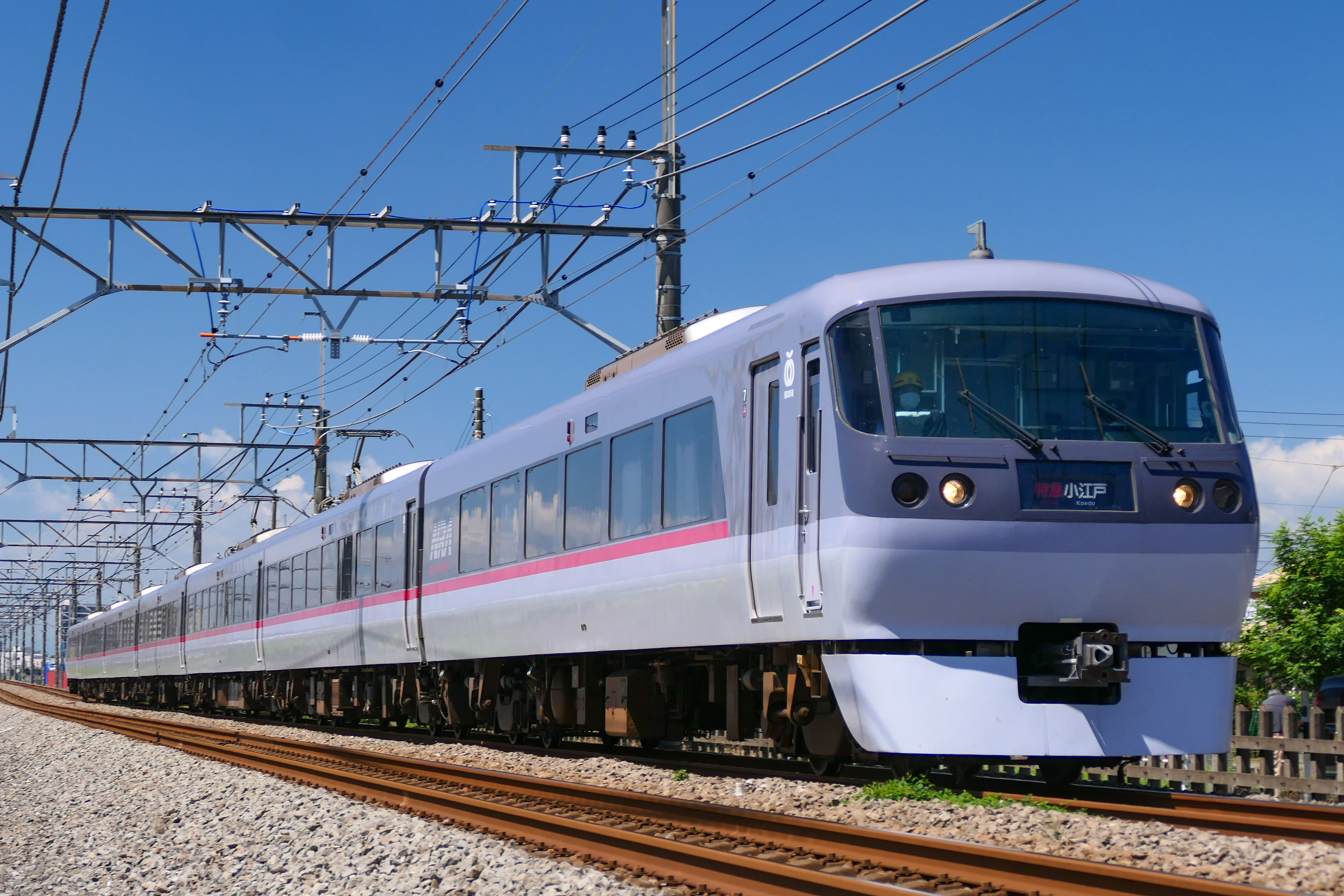
- Seibu 10000 series EMU running on the Seibu Shinjuku Line in July 2022

Overview
- Native name: 新宿線
- Status: In service
- Owner: Seibu Railway Co., Ltd.
- Locale: Kanto region
- Termini: Seibu Shinjuku; Hon-Kawagoe
- Stations: 29

Service
- Type: Commuter rail
- System: Seibu Railway
- Route number: SS
- Operator(s): Seibu Railway Co., Ltd.
- Depot: Minami-Iriso
- Daily ridership: 945,302 (FY2010)

History
- Opened: December 21, 1894; 131 years ago

Technical
- Line length: 47.5 km (29.5 mi)
- Track gauge: 1,067 mm (3 ft 6 in)
- Electrification: 1,500 V DC, overhead catenary
- Operating speed: 105 km/h (65 mph)

The Shinjuku Line (新宿線, Shinjuku-sen) is a Japanese railway line owned by the private railway operator Seibu Railway, connecting Seibu Shinjuku Station in Shinjuku, Tokyo with Hon-Kawagoe Station in Kawagoe, Saitama.

The Shinjuku Line is one of two main lines of the Seibu Railway system along with the Ikebukuro Line. The two main lines cross at Tokorozawa Station in Tokorozawa, Saitama. The line serves the western suburbs of Tokyo, connecting them to Shinjuku and other areas of downtown Tokyo.

== Description ==
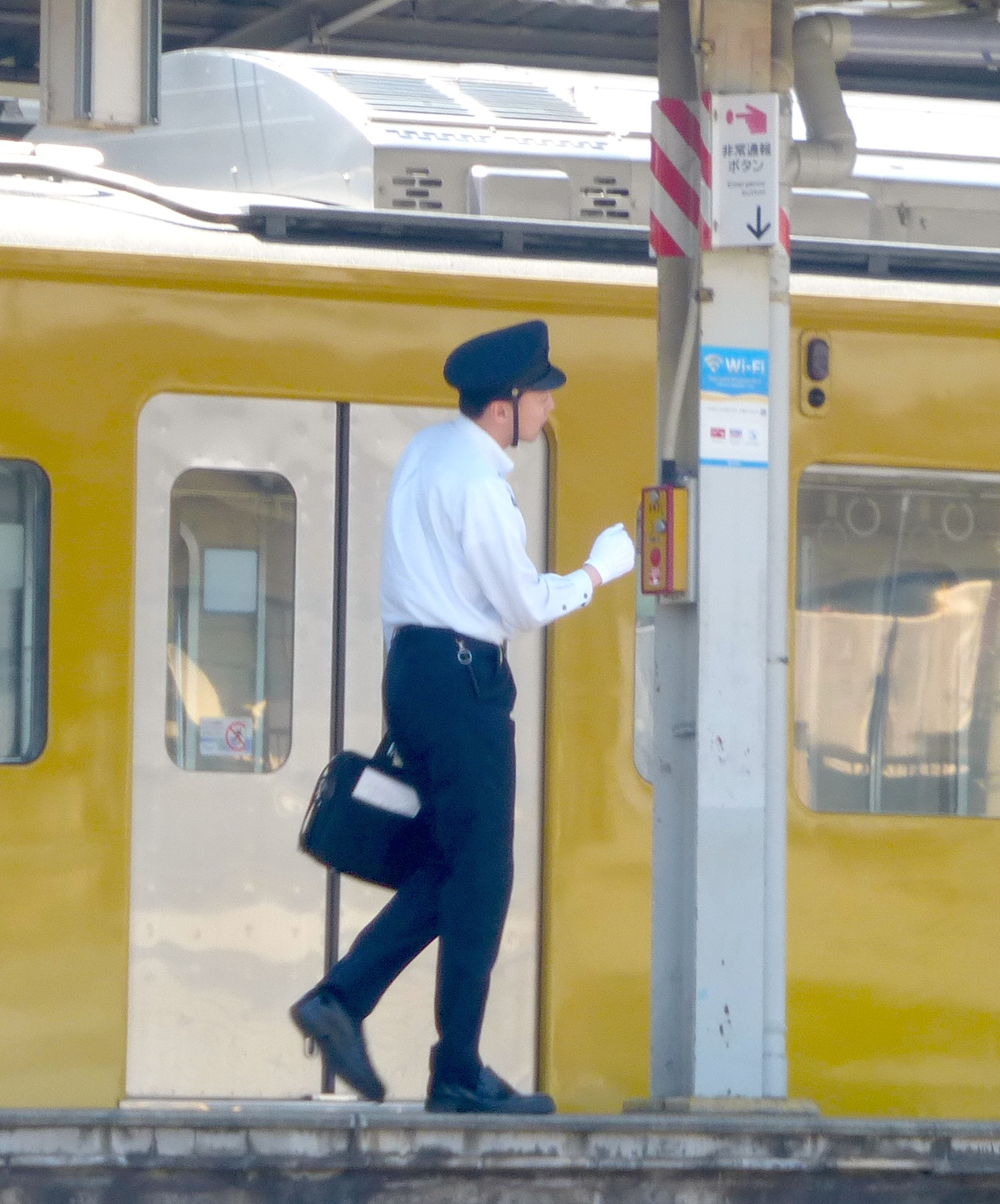
A Seibu Railway train driver at Kami-Shakujii Station in May 2015

The line is mostly double-track, except for 1.1 km (1200 yards) of single track between Wakita Junction and Hon-Kawagoe Station. However, whilst the above section is single tracked, many trains during the day terminate at Shin-Tokorozawa station, or earlier. While the section from Seibu-Shinjuku to Takadanobaba is elevated, the line runs at ground level through a suburban area until Saginomiya.

== Trains ==
Seven types of train service are operated on the line: Local, Semi Express, Express, Commuter Express, Rapid Express, Haijima Liner, and Koedo limited express, as shown below. Limited Express trains use Seibu 10000 series EMUs, and a supplementary limited express ticket is required. In addition, operation of the all-seat reserved train "Haijima Liner" using the Seibu 40000 series EMU started from March of 2018. The "Haijima Liner" operates from Seibu-Shinjuku to Haijima on weekends and in both directions on weekdays.

There are regular through operations to the Haijima Line. There are also occasional through services to Seibukyūjō-mae Station in order to bring fans to the Seibu Dome for Saitama Seibu Lions baseball games. The Seibu Shinjuku Line is one of the few major commuter rail lines in Tokyo that does not have through service to the Tokyo Metro or Toei Subway network.

Through service onto the Seibu Kokubunji Line has been suspended since 19 March 2019 because of the reconstruction of Higashi-Murayama Station into an elevated station.

== Stations ==
O: stop
|: pass
▽:For trains heading to Seibu-Shinjuku: Alighting passengers only / For trains heading to Haijima: Boarding passengers only
▲:For trains heading to Seibu-Shinjuku: Alighting passengers only / For trains heading to Haijima: Both alighting and boarding passengers
L: Local (各停, Kakutei) stop at all stations, not shown
SE: Semi Express (準急, Junkyū)
E: Express (急行, Kyūkō)
CE: Commuter Express (通勤急行, Tsūkin Kyūkō)
RE: Rapid Express (快速急行, Kaisoku Kyūkō)
HL: Haijima Liner (拝島ライナー, Haijima Rainā)
LE: Limited Express Koedo-go (特急「小江戸号」, Tokkyū Koedo-gō)

No.	Station	Japanese	Distance (km)	SE	E	CE	RE	HL	LE	Transfers	Location	
SS01	Seibu-Shinjuku	西武新宿	0.0	O	O	O	O	O	O	(Shinjuku) Chūō Line (JC05) Chūō–Sōbu Line (JB10) Yamanote Line (JY17) Saikyō Line (JA11) Shōnan–Shinjuku Line (JS20) Odawara Line (OH01) Keiō Line/Keiō New Line (KO01) Marunouchi Line (M-08) Ōedo Line (E-27) Shinjuku Line (S-01) (Shinjuku-nishiguchi) Ōedo Line (E-01)	Shinjuku	Tokyo
SS02	Takadanobaba	高田馬場	2.0	O	O	O	O	▽	O	Yamanote Line (JY15); Tōzai Line (T-03)	Shinjuku	Tokyo
SS03	Shimo-Ochiai	下落合	3.2	|	|	↑	↓	↓	|		Shinjuku	Tokyo
SS04	Nakai	中井	3.9	|	|	↑	↓	↓	|	Ōedo Line (E-32)	Shinjuku	Tokyo
SS05	Araiyakushi-mae	新井薬師前	5.2	|	|	↑	↓	↓	|		Nakano	Tokyo
SS06	Numabukuro	沼袋	6.1	|	|	↑	↓	↓	|		Nakano	Tokyo
SS07	Nogata	野方	7.1	|	|	↑	↓	↓	|		Nakano	Tokyo
SS08	Toritsu-Kasei	都立家政	8.0	|	|	↑	↓	↓	|		Nakano	Tokyo
SS09	Saginomiya	鷺ノ宮	8.5	O	O	O	↓	↓	|		Nakano	Tokyo
SS10	Shimo-Igusa	下井草	9.8	|	|	↑	↓	↓	|		Suginami	Tokyo
SS11	Iogi	井荻	10.7	|	|	↑	↓	↓	|		Suginami	Tokyo
SS12	Kami-Igusa	上井草	11.7	|	|	↑	↓	↓	|		Suginami	Tokyo
SS13	Kami-Shakujii	上石神井	12.8	O	O	O	↓	↓	|		Nerima	Tokyo
SS14	Musashi-Seki	武蔵関	14.1	O	|	↑	↓	↓	|		Nerima	Tokyo
SS15	Higashi-Fushimi	東伏見	15.3	O	|	↑	↓	↓	|		Nishitōkyō	Tokyo
SS16	Seibu-Yagisawa	西武柳沢	16.3	O	|	↑	↓	↓	|		Nishitōkyō	Tokyo
SS17	Tanashi	田無	17.6	O	O	O	O	↓	|		Nishitōkyō	Tokyo
SS18	Hana-Koganei	花小金井	19.9	O	O	↑	↓	↓	|		Kodaira	Tokyo
SS19	Kodaira	小平	22.6	O	O	↑	↓	▲	|	Haijima Line (SS19)	Kodaira	Tokyo
SS20	Kumegawa	久米川	24.6	O	O	↑	↓		|		Higashimurayama	Tokyo
SS21	Higashi-Murayama	東村山	26.0	O	O	O	O		O	Kokubunji Line (SK05); Seibuen Line (SK05)	Higashimurayama	Tokyo
SS22	Tokorozawa	所沢	28.9	O	O	O	O		O	Ikebukuro Line (SI17)	Tokorozawa	Saitama
SS23	Kōkū-kōen	航空公園	30.5	O	O	↑	↓		|		Tokorozawa	Saitama
SS24	Shin-Tokorozawa	新所沢	31.7	O	O	O	O		|		Tokorozawa	Saitama
SS25	Iriso	入曽	35.6	O	O	↑	O		|		Sayama	Saitama
SS26	Sayamashi	狭山市	38.6	O	O	O	O		O		Sayama	Saitama
SS27	Shin-Sayama	新狭山	41.3	O	O	↑	O		|		Sayama	Saitama
SS28	Minami-Ōtsuka	南大塚	43.9	O	O	↑	O		|	Ahina Line (Freight, closed)	Kawagoe	Saitama
SS29	Hon-Kawagoe	本川越	47.5	O	O	O	O		O	■■ Kawagoe Line (Kawagoe); Tojo Line (Kawagoe: TJ21, Kawagoeshi: TJ22)	Kawagoe	Saitama

Notes:

- From September 19th, 2026 until January 3rd, 2027, the Limited Express Koedo-go (特急「小江戸号」, Tokkyū Koedo-gō) will make stops at Tanashi Station when following the Saturday/Holiday timetable.

A new 2000 series train running down the tracks, 2015

== Rolling stock ==
=== In service ===
==== Commuter trains ====
- Seibu 2000 series
- Seibu 6000 series
- Seibu 20000 series
- Seibu 30000 series
- Seibu 40000 series
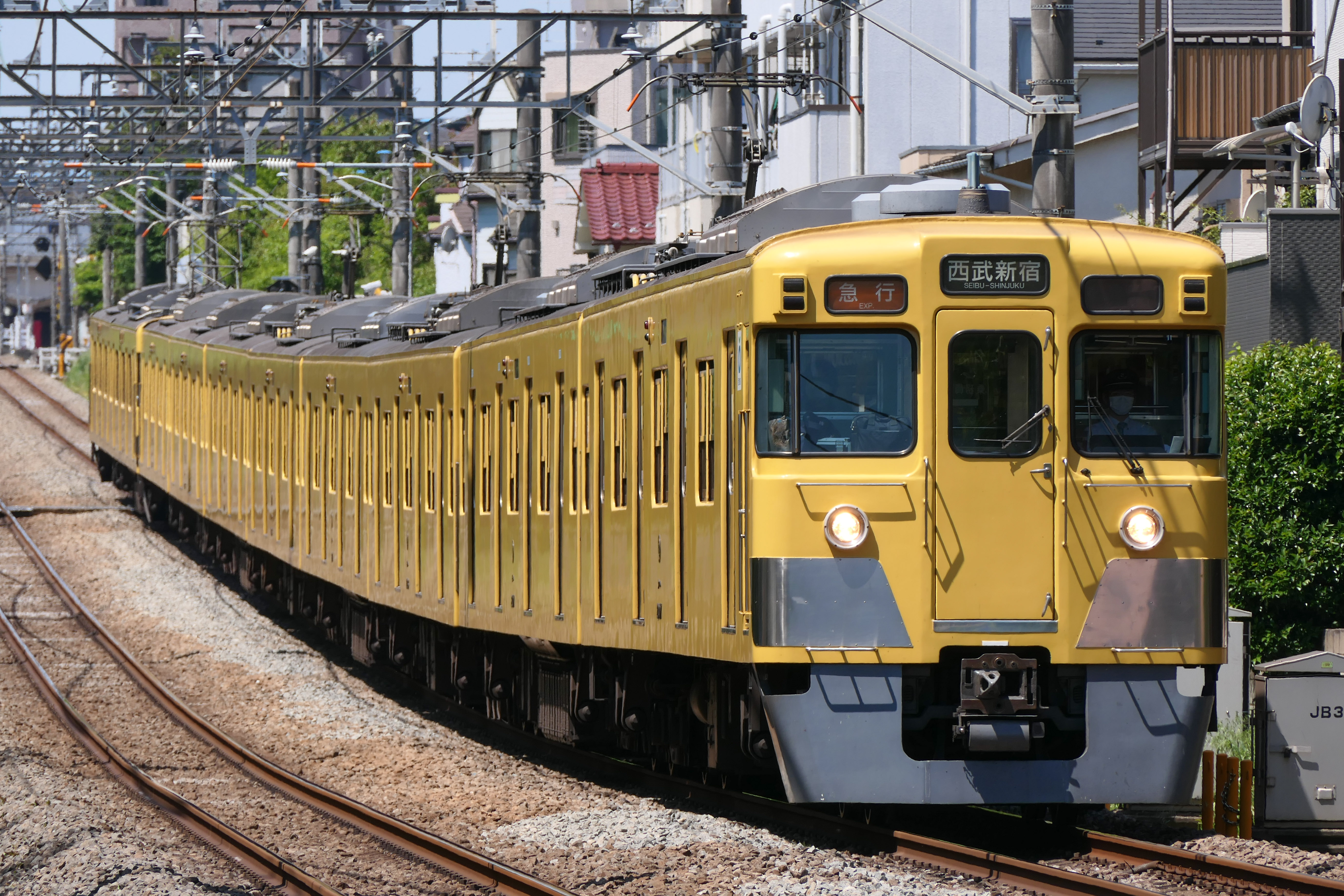
2000 series

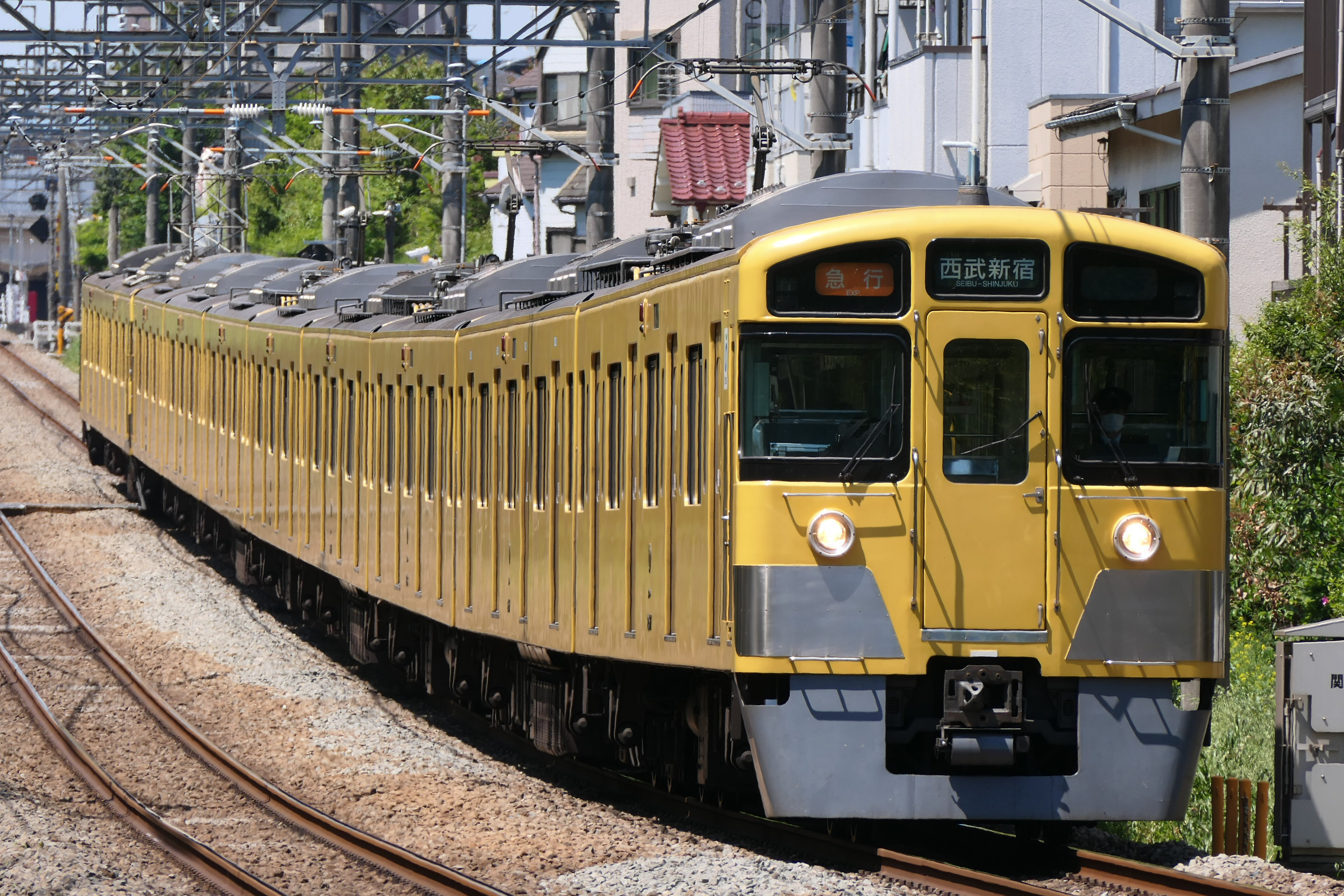
New 2000 series

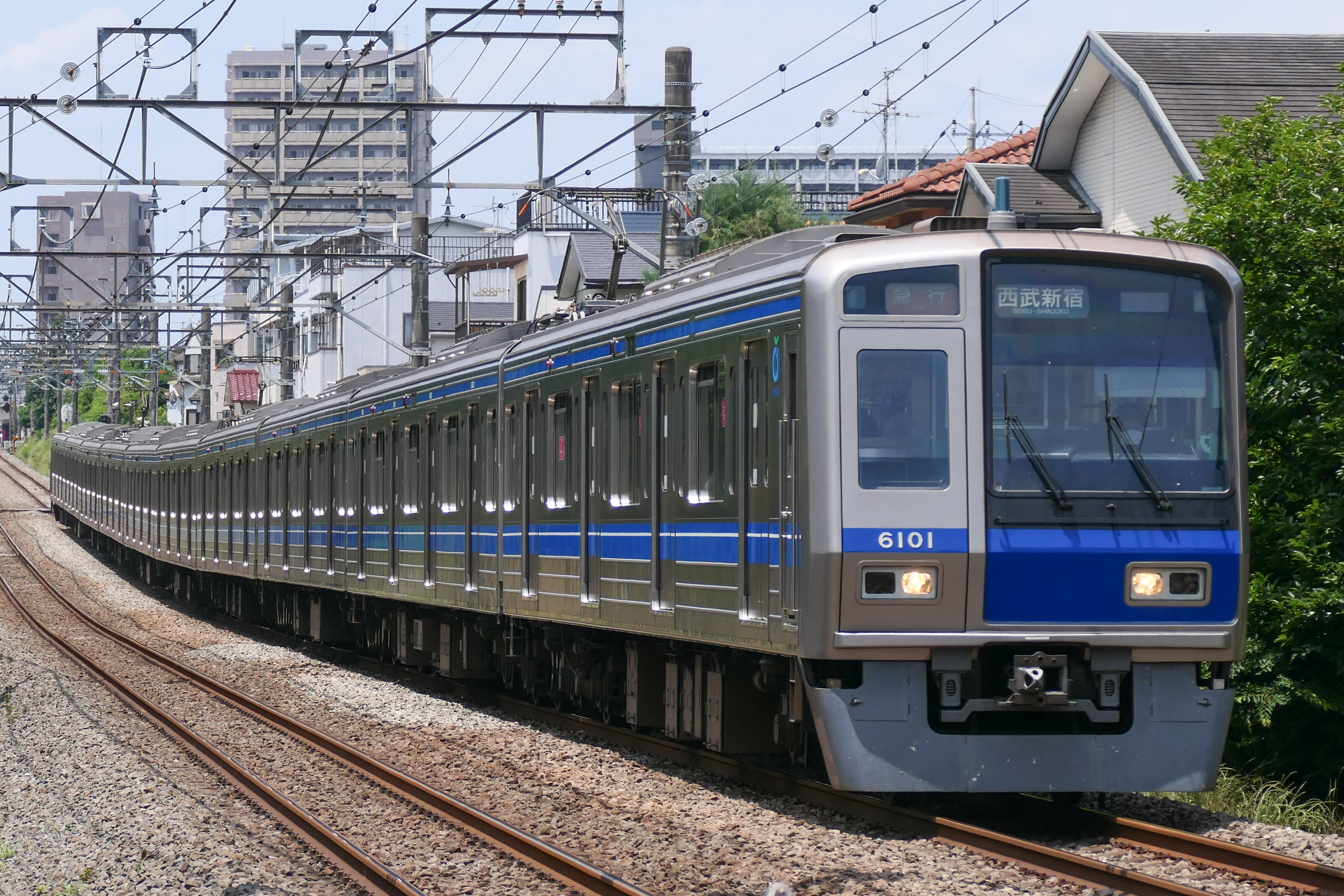
6000 series

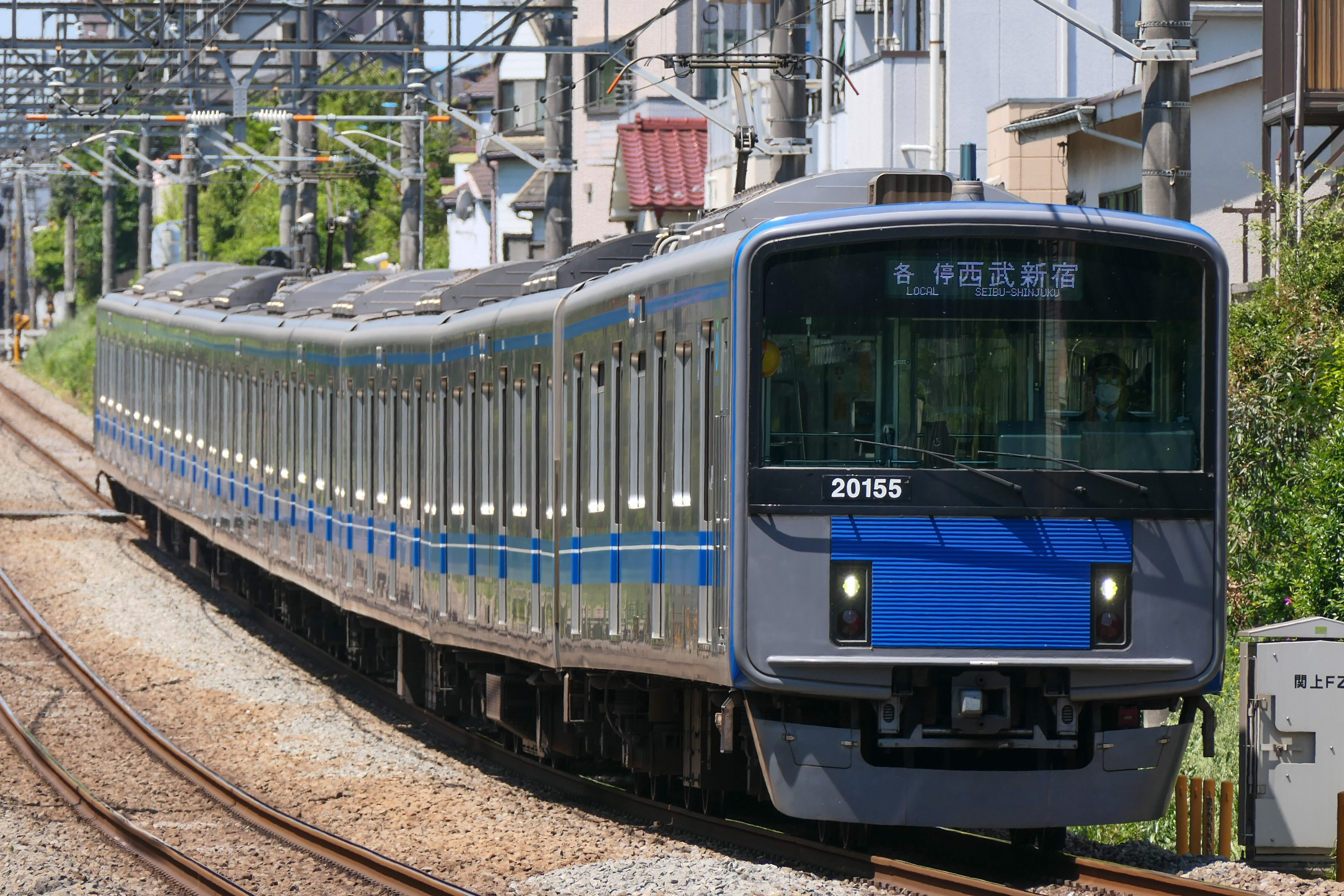
20000 series

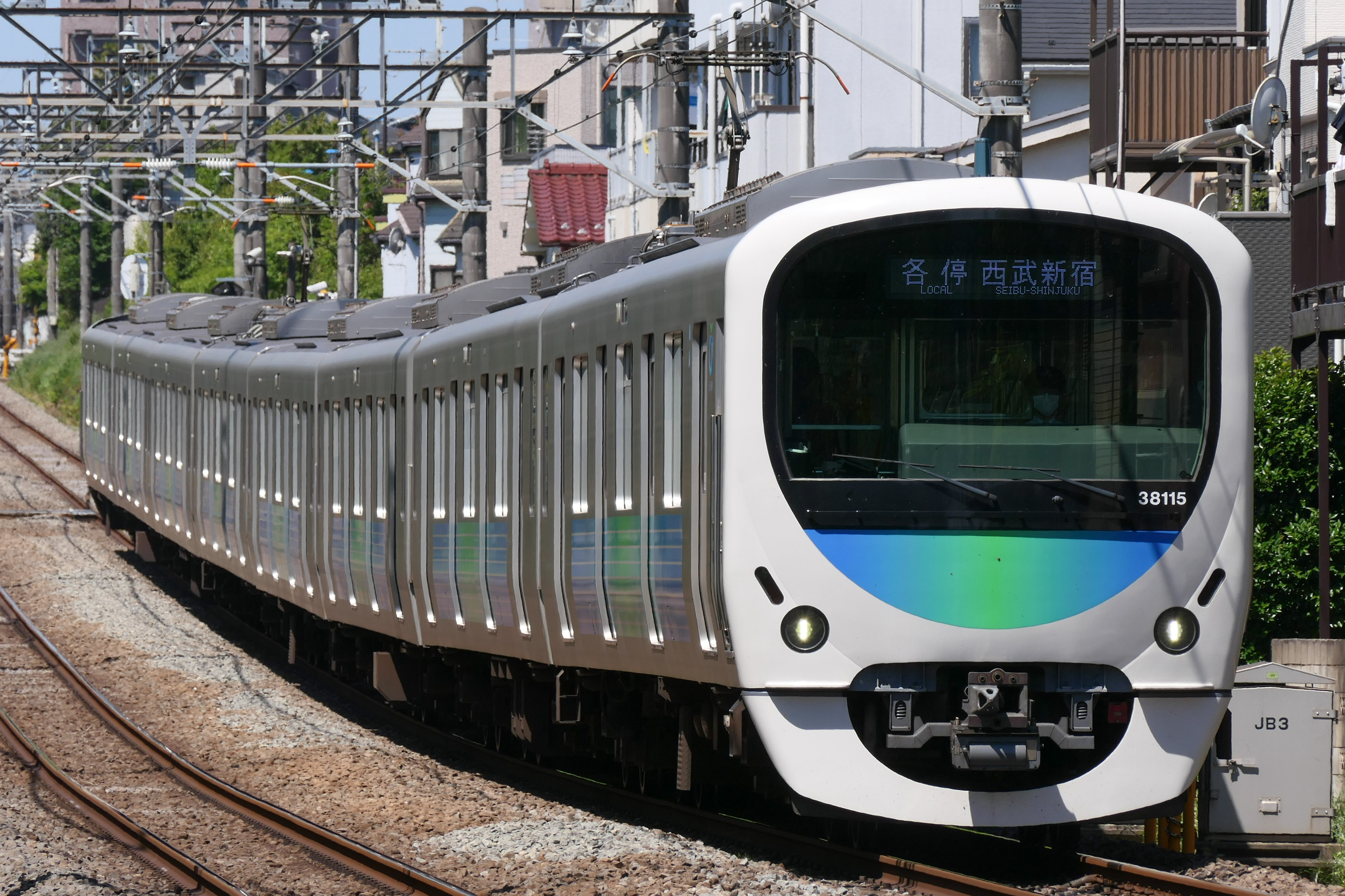
30000 series

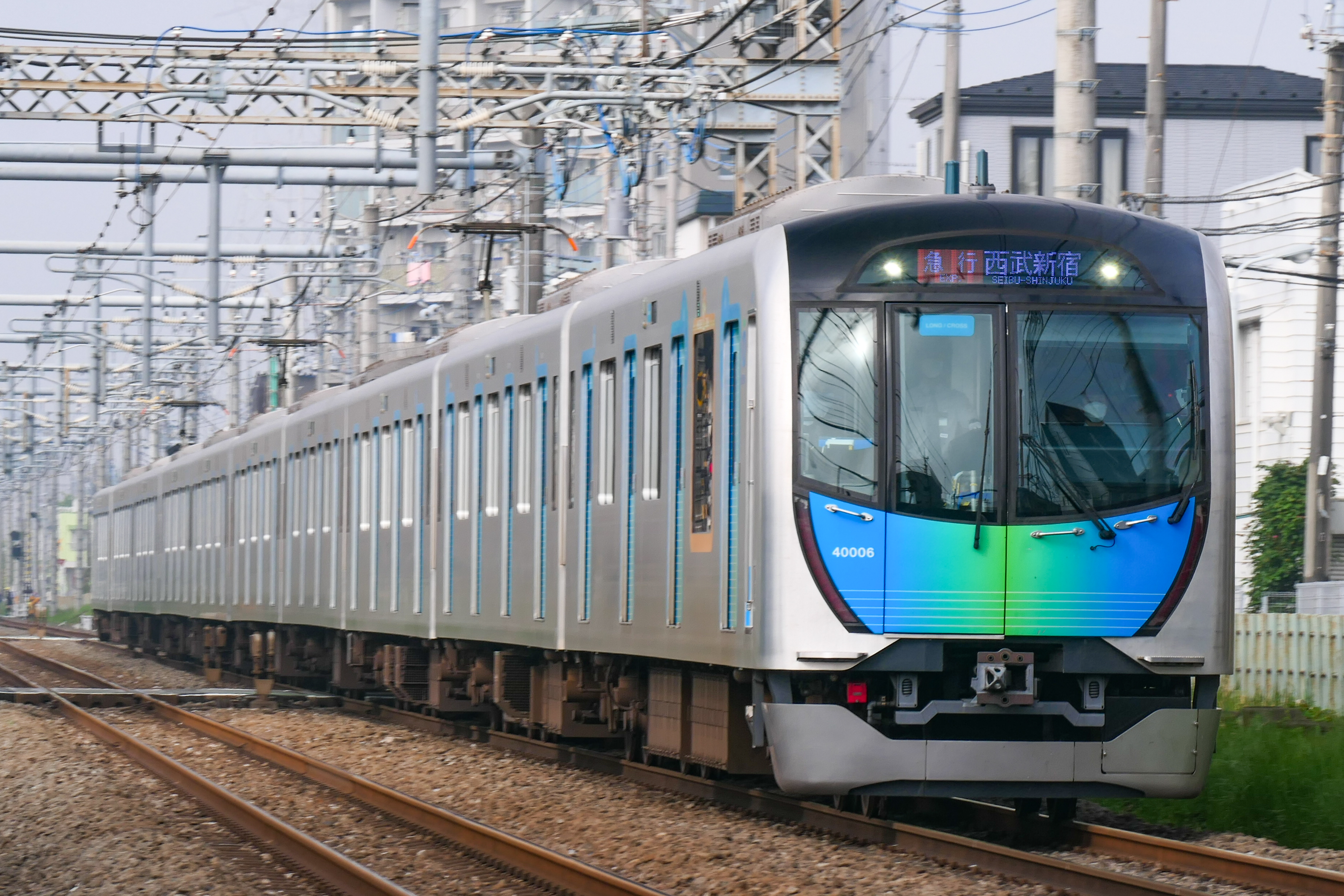
40000 series

==== Limited express trains ====
- Seibu 10000 series
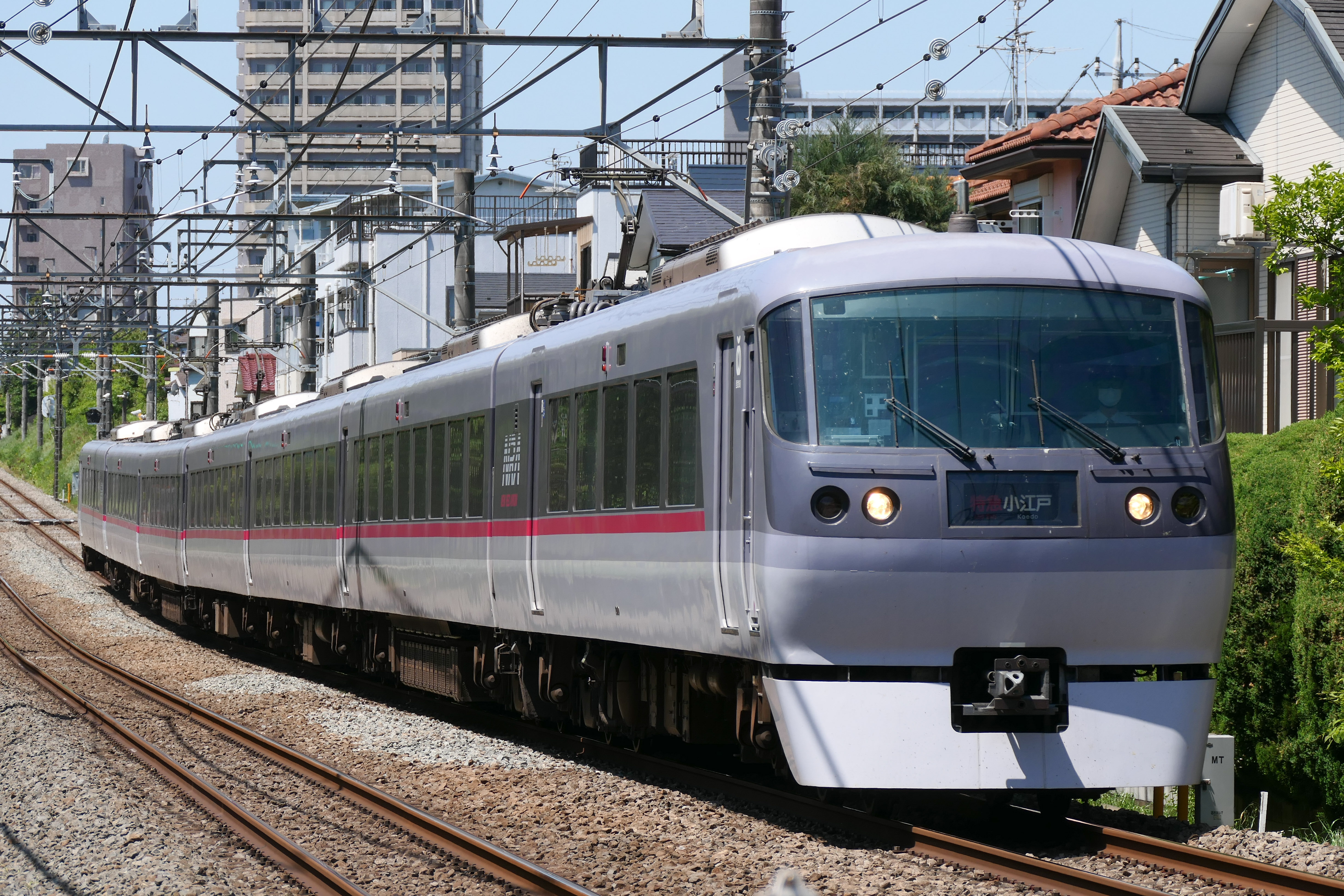
10000 series

== History ==
The oldest section of the Shinjuku Line is between Higashi-Murayama Station and Hon-Kawagoe Station. This section was built by the Kawagoe Railway (川越鉄道, Kawagoe Tetsudō) to serve as a freight feeder for the Kōbu Railway (甲武鉄道, Kōbu Tetsudō) between Shinjuku and Tachikawa (now known as the Chūō Main Line). The initial Kawagoe Railway route opened between Kokubunji and Kumegawa in 1894; this portion is now known as the Seibu Kokubunji Line. Its northward extension to Kawagoe, the first part of what is now the Seibu Shinjuku Line, opened in 1895. Following several mergers and name changes between 1920 and 1922, the Kawagoe Railway became part of the Seibu Railway.

In 1927, Seibu Railway built its new dual track, electrified at 1,500 V DC, Murayama Line between Takadanobaba Station on the Yamanote Line in Tokyo and Higashi-Murayama Station to compete with Musashino Railway (武蔵野鉄道, Musashino Tetsudō) (present-day Seibu Ikebukuro Line) and the Japanese National Railways Chūō Main Line, the route being in the middle of the two. The rest of the line was electrified at the same time.

The Higashi-Murayama to Tokorozawa section was double-tracked between 1950 and 1958, with the Tokorozawa to Irimagawa section double-tracked between 1967 and 1975. The rest of the line (except for the section between the Wakita Junction and Hon-Kawagoe Station) was double-tracked between 1980 and 1991.

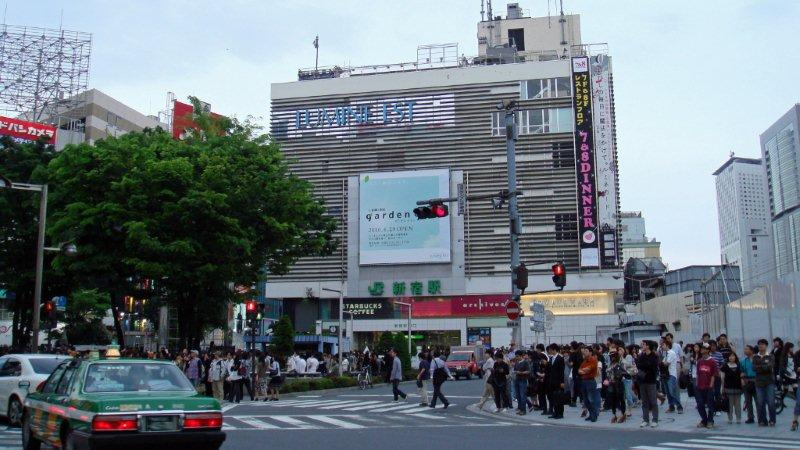
Lumine Est building, originally designed to house the Tokyo terminal for the Seibu Shinjuku Line

In 1952, a dual-track extension from Takadanobaba to Seibu-Shinjuku Station was completed. At this time the line was renamed the Shinjuku Line, integrating the Murayama Line and the northern section of the Kawagoe Line. The new Seibu-Shinjuku terminal was built as a temporary station, as Seibu planned to extend the line to the second floor of what is now known as Lumine Est on the east side of Shinjuku Station. This plan was later scrapped due to insufficient space to handle trains longer than six cars. Seibu-Shinjuku Station was expanded to include a high-rise hotel in 1977.

From the start of the revised timetable on 30 June 2012, the Haijima rapid (拝島快速, Haijima kaisoku) and Rapid Express (快速急行, Kaisoku Kyūkō) services were abolished.

Station numbering was introduced on all Seibu Railway lines during fiscal 2012, with Seibu Shinjuku Line stations numbered prefixed with the letters "SS"(SeibuShinjuku line).

From the timetable revision on 14 March 2020, the limited-stop Rapid Express (快速急行, Kaisoku Kyūkō) was reinstated for weekend and holiday services.

=== Express tunnel ===
In the 1980s, Seibu drew up a plan to build an underground line for express trains between Seibu-Shinjuku and Kami-Shakujii, including a new underground station between Seibu-Shinjuku and the Metro Promenade. This plan was indefinitely postponed in 1995 due to costs and a decline in passenger ridership versus previous projections. Seibu was also a bidder to acquire the former JR freight terminal site in 1989, where they planned to build a new underground terminal; Takashimaya won the bid and constructed the Takashimaya Times Square complex on the site. In 2019, the Tokyo Metropolitan Government officially cancelled the plan.

== Future expansion ==
=== Through operations with the Tokyo Metro Tozai Line ===
During the 1960s, Seibu unsuccessfully negotiated with the Teito Rapid Transit Authority to offer through service between the Seibu Shinjuku Line and Tozai Line. Seibu's approach was rejected in favor of through operation with the Chuo Main Line. At Takadanobaba station, the interchange between the Seibu Shinjuku Line and Tozai Line involves passing through a few levels from the elevated Seibu Shinjuku line platform to the underground Tozai line platform. The transfer is considerably crowded during the rush hour, as Takadanobaba is the busiest station on the entire Seibu Shinjuku Line. On March 9, 2015, the Nakano Ward Council released a proposal for through operations between the Seibu Shinjuku Line and Tokyo Metro Tozai Line by constructing an underground connection between the two lines to remove the transfer between the two lines. In September 2020, Seibu Railway President Kimio Kitamura said during an interview with the Toyo Keizai that there have been many complaints from passengers heading to the city center on the Seibu Shinjuku Line and Seibu is considering various options to address this issue, such as getting through service into the Tokyo Metro Tozai Line.

=== Grade separation projects ===
Initial work has started on grade separating the line from Nogata to Iogi Stations and from Iogi to Seibu-Yagisawa Stations. Proposals are being done to for grade separating the line from Tanashi to Hanakoganei Stations and from Takadanobaba to Nakai Stations.

== See also ==
- List of railway lines in Japan
