= Tanashi Station =

Railway station in Nishitōkyō, Tokyo, Japan

SS17 Tanashi Station 田無駅
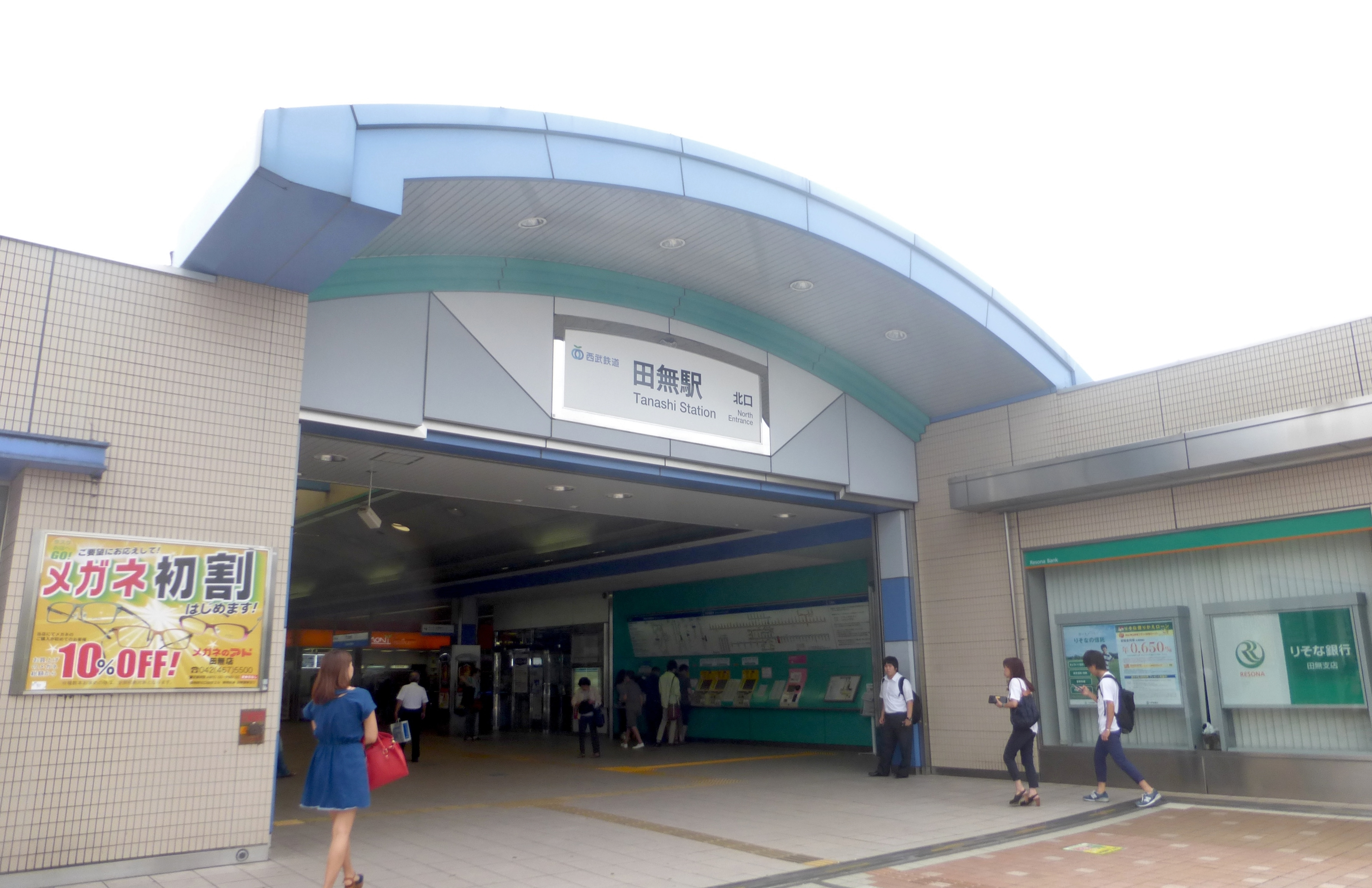
- Tanashi Station North Entrance, August 2015

General information
- Location: 4-1-1 Tanashi-chō, Nishitōkyō-shi, Tokyo-to 188-0011; Japan
- Coordinates: 35.7271°N 139.5393°E
- Operator: Seibu Railway
- Line: Seibu Shinjuku Line
- Distance: 17.6 from Seibu-Shinjuku
- Platforms: 2 island platforms

Other information
- Station code: SS17
- Website: Official website

History
- Opened: 16 April 1927

Passengers
- FY2019: 75,418 daily

Services
| Preceding station | Seibu Railway | Following station |
|---|---|---|
| Higashi-Murayama SS21 towards Hon-Kawagoe | Shinjuku Line Rapid Express | Takadanobaba One-way operation |
| Higashi-Murayama One-way operation | Shinjuku Line Commuter Express | Kami-Shakujii SS13 towards Seibu-Shinjuku |
| Hana-Koganei SS18 towards Hon-Kawagoe | Shinjuku Line Express | Kami-Shakujii SS13 towards Seibu-Shinjuku |
| Hana-Koganei SS18 towards Hon-Kawagoe | Shinjuku Line Semi Express Local | Seibu-Yagisawa SS16 towards Seibu-Shinjuku |
Location
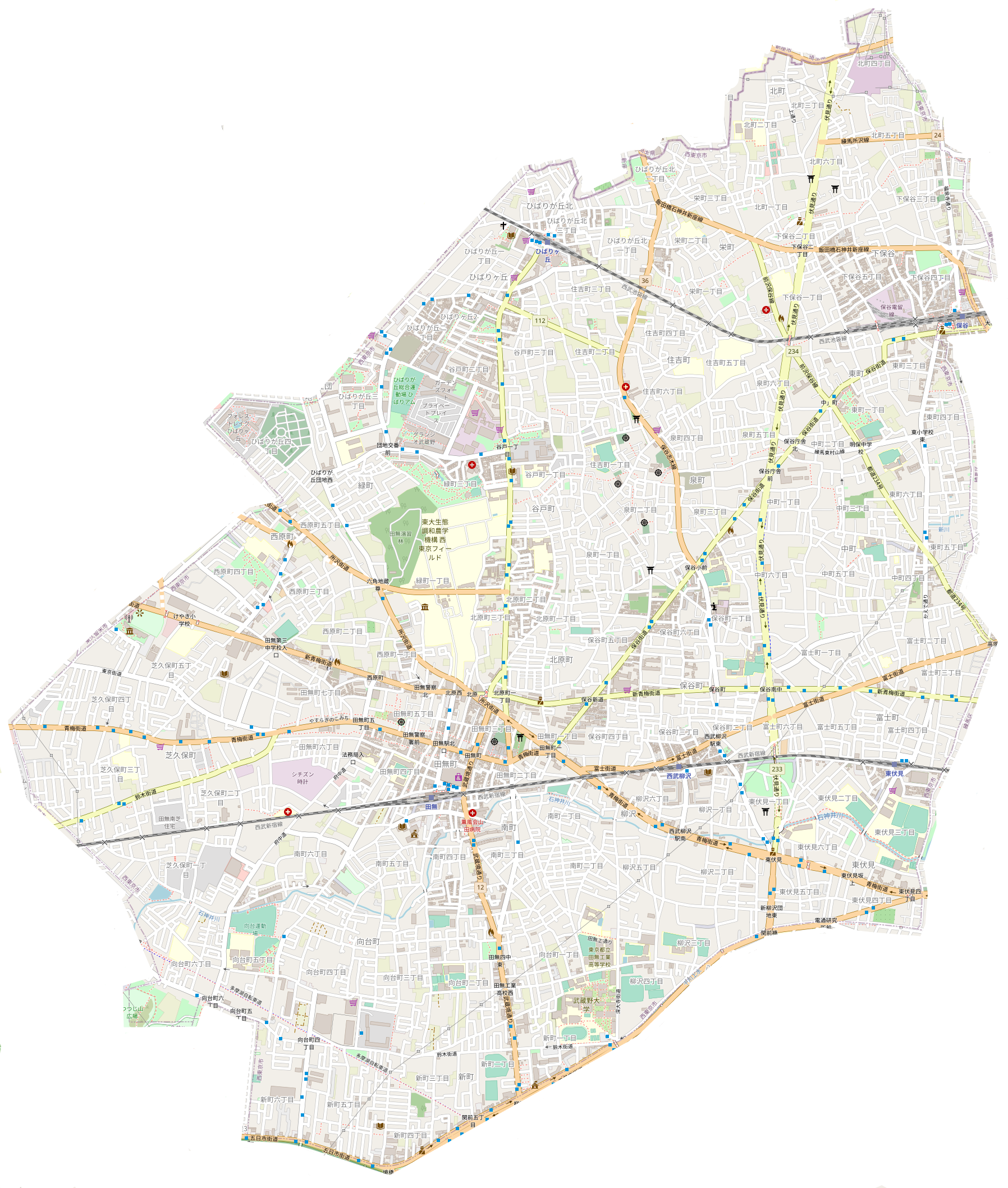
- Location within Nishitōkyō city Location within Tokyo Location within Japan

Tanashi Station (田無駅, Tanashi-eki) is a passenger railway station located in the city of Nishitōkyō, Tokyo, Japan, operated by the private railway operator Seibu Railway.

== Lines ==
Tanashi Station is served by the 47.5 km Seibu Shinjuku Line from Seibu-Shinjuku in Tokyo to Hon-Kawagoe in Saitama Prefecture. Located between Seibu-Yagisawa and Hana-Koganei, it lies 17.6 km from the Seibu Shinjuku terminus. All trains except Limited express Koedo services and the Haijima Liner stop at Tanashi Station.

== Station layout ==
The station has two elevated island platforms serving three tracks. Platform 2 and 3 share the same track.

=== Platforms ===
| 1/2 | Seibu Shinjuku Line | for Tokorozawa, Haijima, and Hon-Kawagoe |
| 3/4 | Seibu Shinjuku Line | for Takadanobaba and Seibu-Shinjuku |

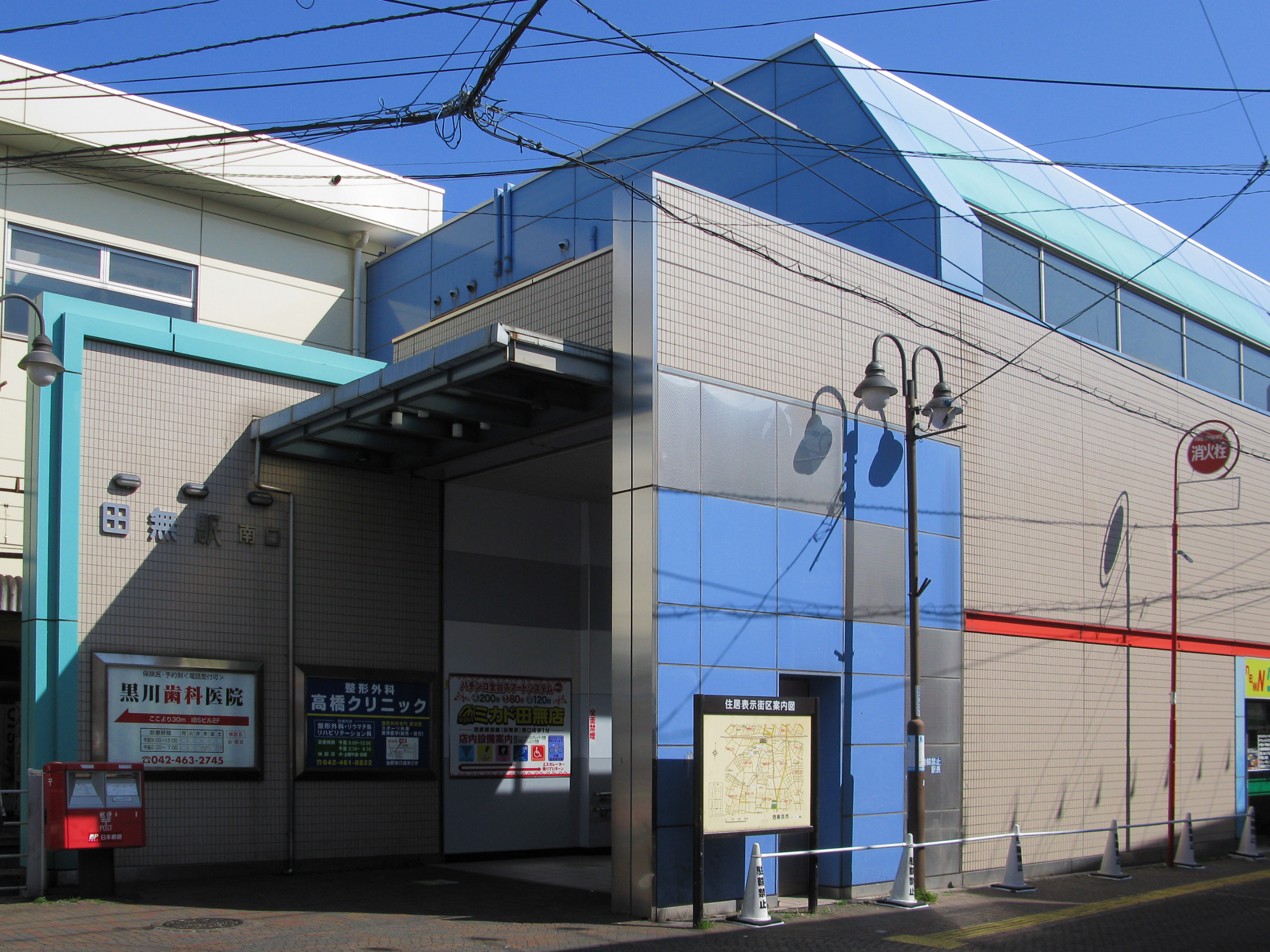
The south entrance, March 2012

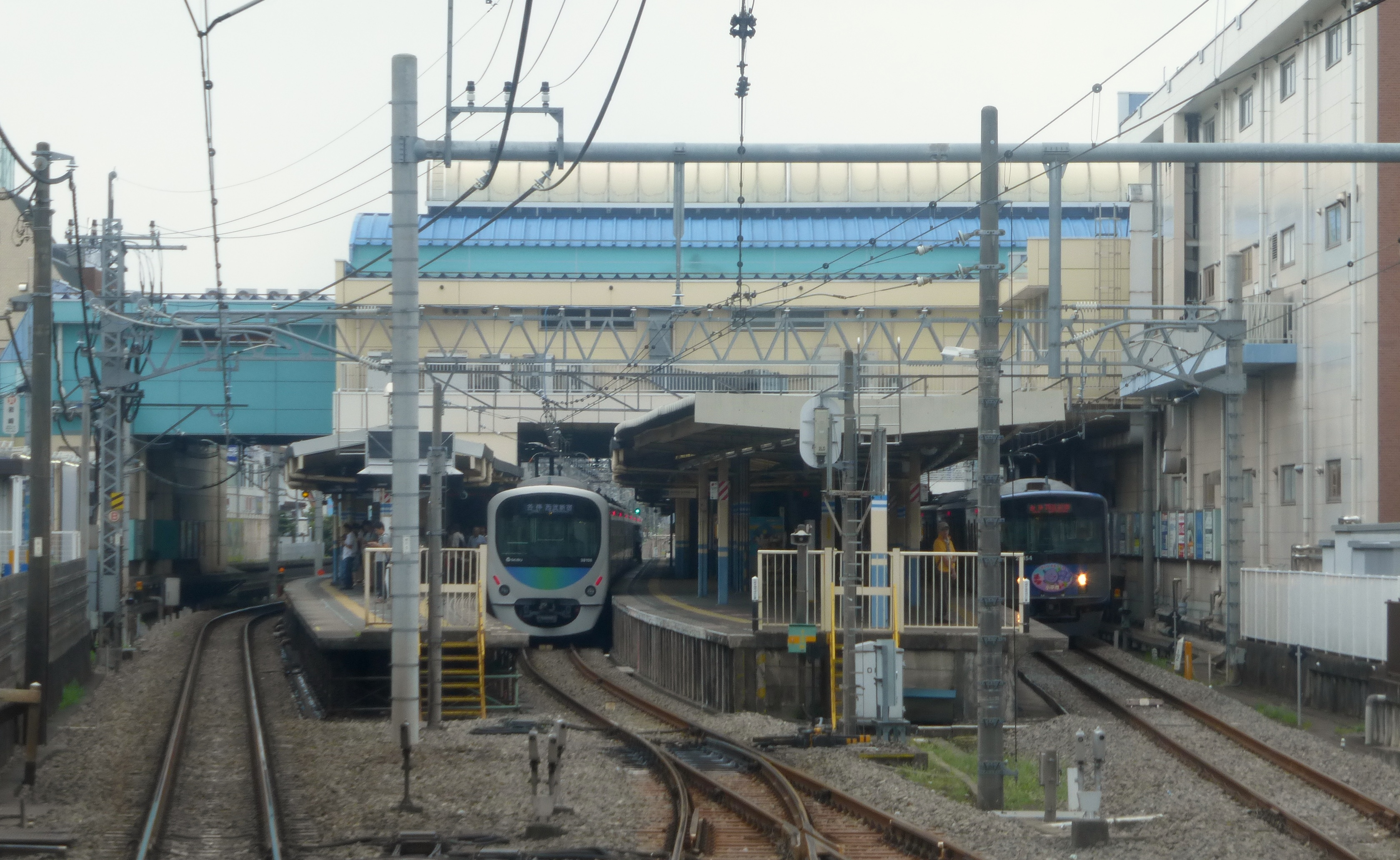
The station platforms viewed from the east, August 2015

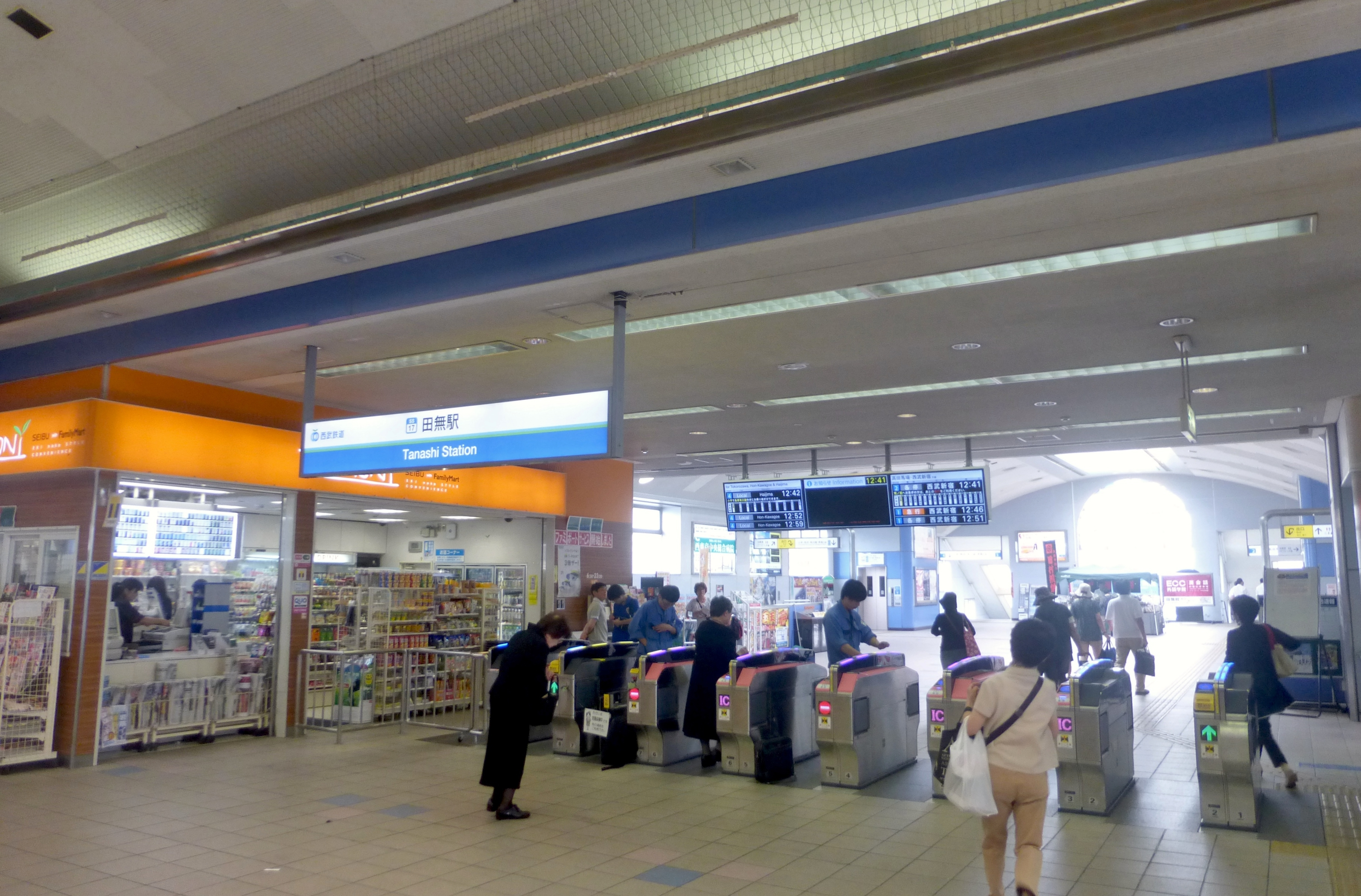
The ticket barriers, August 2015

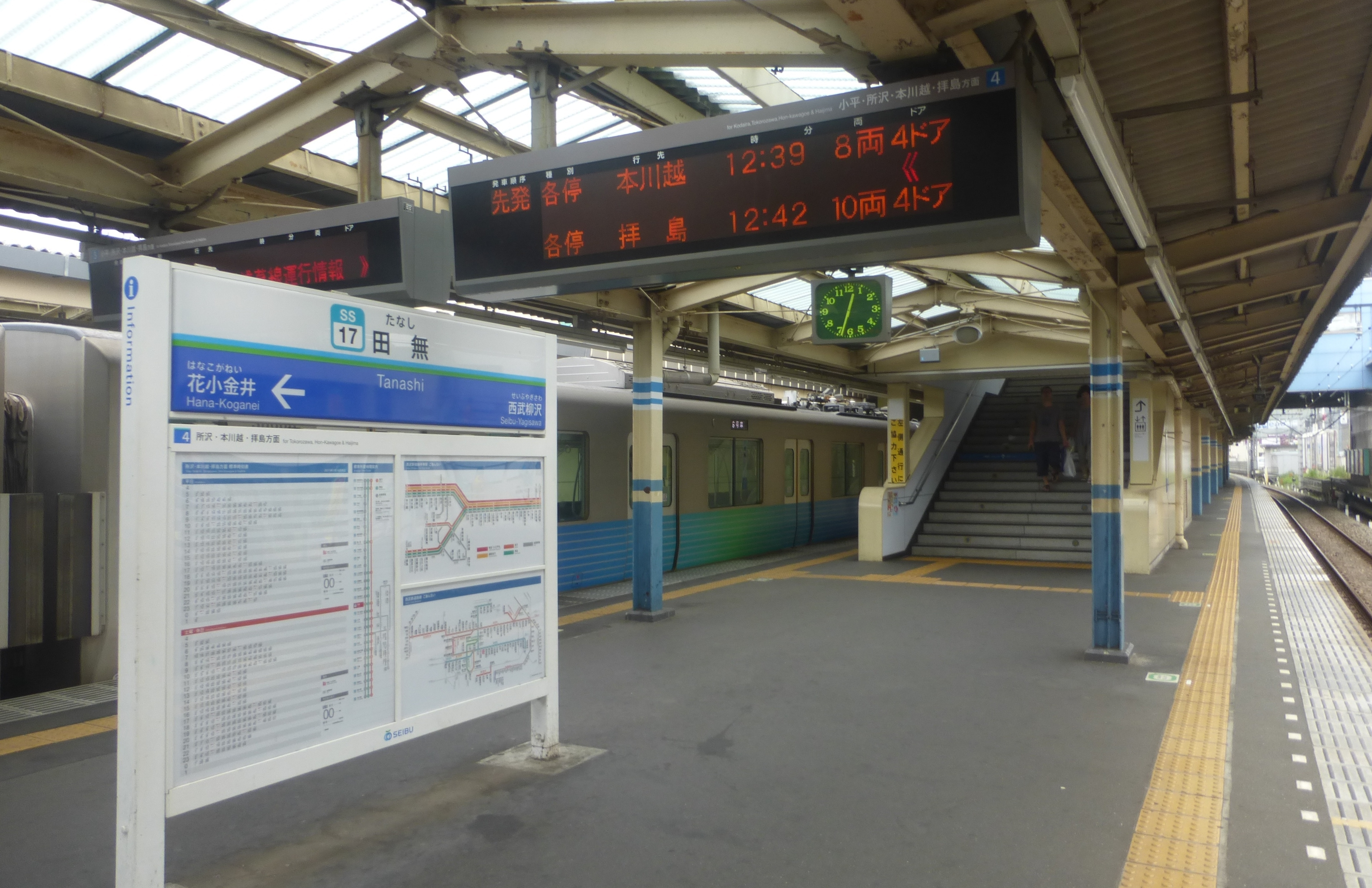
Platform 3 and 4, August 2015

== History ==
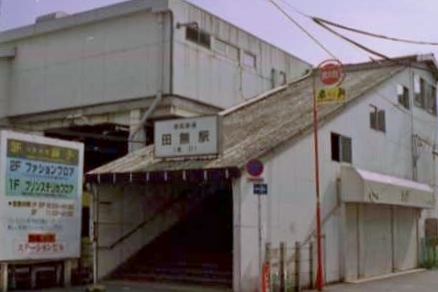
The south entrance of the station in 1991

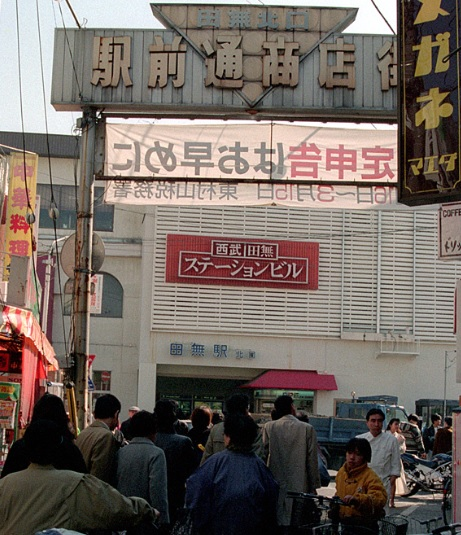
The north entrance of the station in 1991

Tanashi Station opened on 16 April 1927.

Station numbering was introduced on all Seibu Railway lines during fiscal 2012, with Tanashi Station becoming "SS17".

== Passenger statistics ==
In fiscal 2019, the station was the 11th busiest on the Seibu network with an average of 75,418 passengers daily. The passenger figures for previous years are as shown below.

| Fiscal year | Daily average |
|---|---|
| 2000 | 69,945 |
| 2005 | 73,783 |
| 2010 | 75,106 |
| 2015 | 74,808 |

== Surrounding area ==
- Nishitokyo Public Hall
- Tokyo Legal Affairs Bureau Tanashi Branch Office
- Citizen Watch Headquarters
- Nishitokyo Post Office
- Nishitokyo City Tanashi General Welfare Center
- Nishitokyo City Tanashicho District Hall
- Shin-ei Animation

== In popular culture ==
The station is a frequent setting in the Japanese animated sitcom Atashin'chi, adjacent to the surrounding region that was formerly Tanashi.

Another animated series that has several scenes around the station is Adachi and Shimamura.

== See also ==
- List of railway stations in Japan
