= Takadanobaba Station =

Railway and metro station in Tokyo, Japan

Coordinates: 35°42′46″N 139°42′14″E

JY15 SS02 Takadanobaba Station 高田馬場駅

- Waseda entrance, July 2026

General information
- Location: Shinjuku, Tokyo; Japan
- Operator: JR East; Seibu Railway; Tokyo Metro
- Lines: Yamanote Line; Seibu Shinjuku Line; Tōzai Line (T-03)

History
- Opened: 15 September 1910; 116 years ago

Passengers
- FY2024: 359,332 daily; 274,114 daily; 175,766 daily

Services
Preceding station	JR East	Following station
Shin-Ōkubo JY16 Next counter-clockwise	Yamanote Line	Mejiro JY14 Next clockwise
Preceding station	Seibu Railway	Following station
Higashi-Murayama SS21 towards Hon-Kawagoe	Koedo	Seibu-Shinjuku SS01 Terminus
Kodaira SS19 towards Haijima	Haijima Liner	Seibu-Shinjuku SS01 Terminus
Tanashi SS17 towards Hon-Kawagoe	Shinjuku Line Rapid Express	Seibu-Shinjuku SS01 Terminus
Saginomiya SS09 towards Hon-Kawagoe	Shinjuku Line Commuter Express Express Semi Express	Seibu-Shinjuku SS01 Terminus
Shimo-Ochiai SS03 towards Hon-Kawagoe	Shinjuku Line Local	Seibu-Shinjuku SS01 Terminus
Preceding station	Tokyo Metro	Following station
Ochiai towards Nakano	Tōzai Line Rapid Commuter Rapid Local	Waseda towards Nishi-Funabashi
Location
- Location within Tokyo Yamanote Loop Location within Tokyo wards area Location within Japan

Takadanobaba Station (Japanese: 高田馬場駅, Hepburn: Takadanobaba-eki; Japanese pronunciation: [ta.ka.da no baꜜ.ba, ta.ka.da no ba.baꜜ.e.kʲi]) is a railway station in the Takadanobaba area of Tokyo's Shinjuku ward, situated between the commercial districts of Ikebukuro and Shinjuku.

The station is a major commuting hub, linking the Seibu Shinjuku Line, Tokyo Metro Tōzai Line and Yamanote Line. It also serves the surrounding Takadanobaba area, known as a popular student district, and is linked by bus to nearby Waseda University. It is the busiest station on the Seibu Shinjuku Line, and the second-busiest in the Seibu Railway network after Ikebukuro Station. It is the ninth-busiest station in the Tokyo Metro network and the eleventh-busiest station in the JR East network.

== Lines ==
Takadanobaba Station is served by the following lines:

- East Japan Railway Company (JR East)
  - Yamanote Line
- Seibu Railway
  - Seibu Shinjuku Line
- Tokyo Metro
  - Tokyo Metro Tōzai Line

== Station layout ==
=== Platforms ===
==== Yamanote and Seibu Shinjuku Line ====
The Yamanote Line island platform and two Seibu Shinjuku Line platforms are located parallel to each other, and are connected by an overhead transfer concourse, as well as transfer gates at ground level by the main Waseda exit.

1	Yamanote Line (Clockwise)	for Ikebukuro, Ueno, and Tokyo
2	Yamanote Line (Anti-clockwise)	for Shinjuku, Shibuya, and Shinagawa
3	Seibu Shinjuku Line	for Tanashi, Tokorozawa, Haijima, and Hon-Kawagoe
4	Seibu Shinjuku Line	Spare arrival platform used for Seibu-Shinjuku bound trains on weekday mornings only
5	Seibu Shinjuku Line	for Seibu-Shinjuku

The theme music from Astro Boy is played prior to each train departure from the Yamanote Line platform, a homage to the series being set in the Takadanobaba area. Chest-high platform edge doors were brought into use on the Yamanote Line platform on 21 December 2013.

The Yamanote Freight Line tracks (used by Saikyo Line and Shonan-Shinjuku Line services) pass Takadanobaba running between the Yamanote Line and Seibu Shinjuku Line tracks.

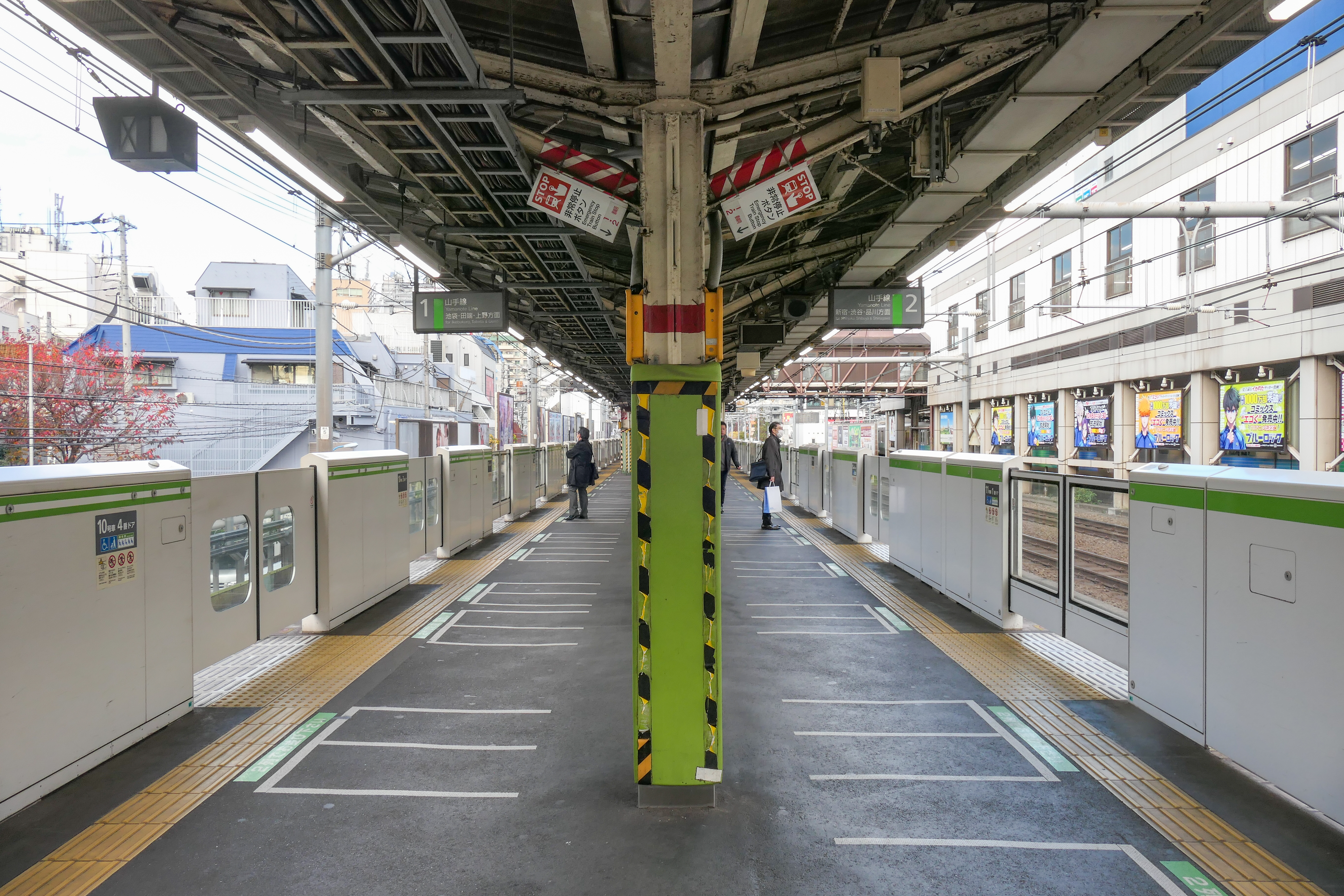
Yamanote line platforms 1 and 2

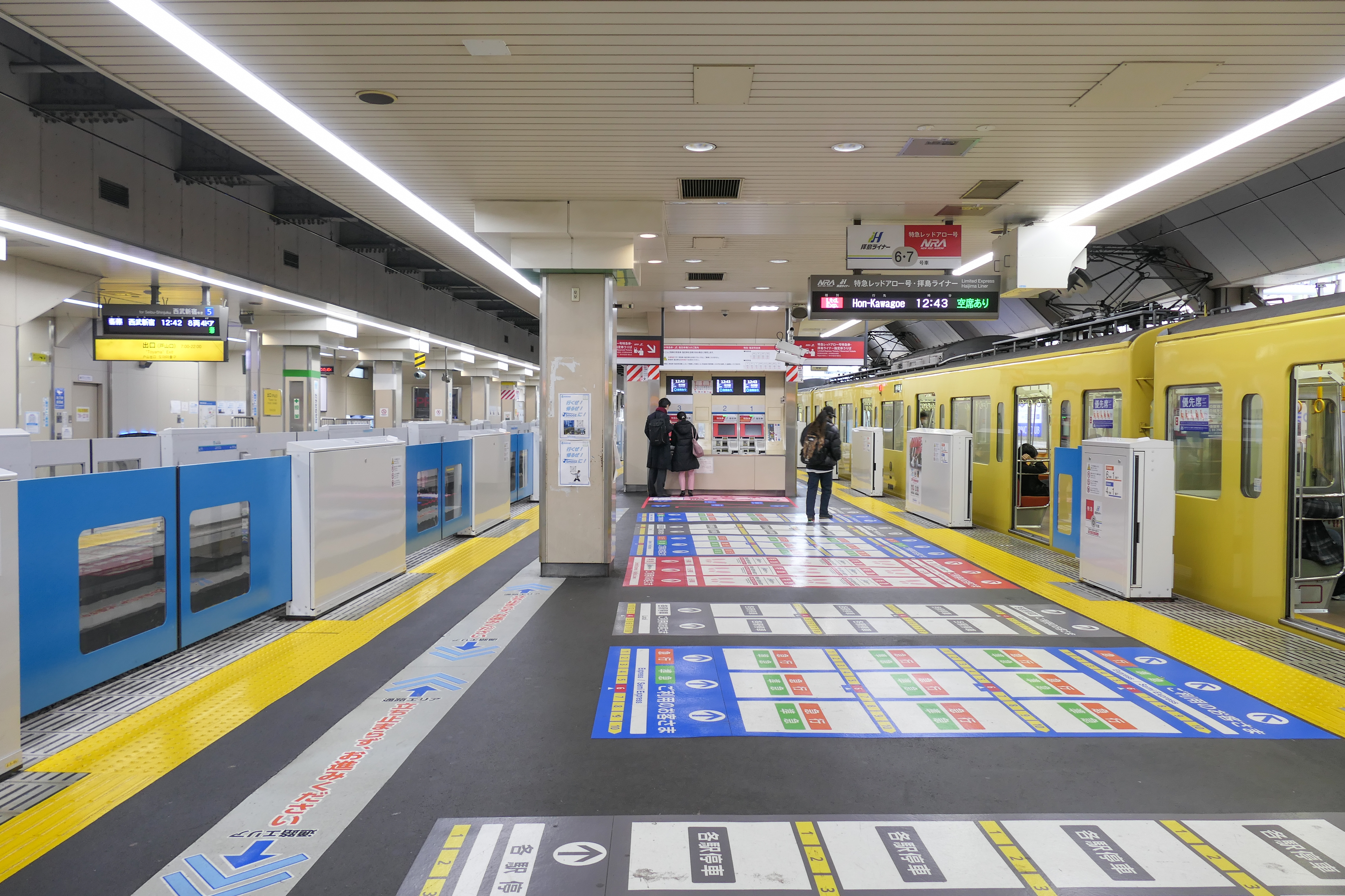
Seibu platforms 3 and 4

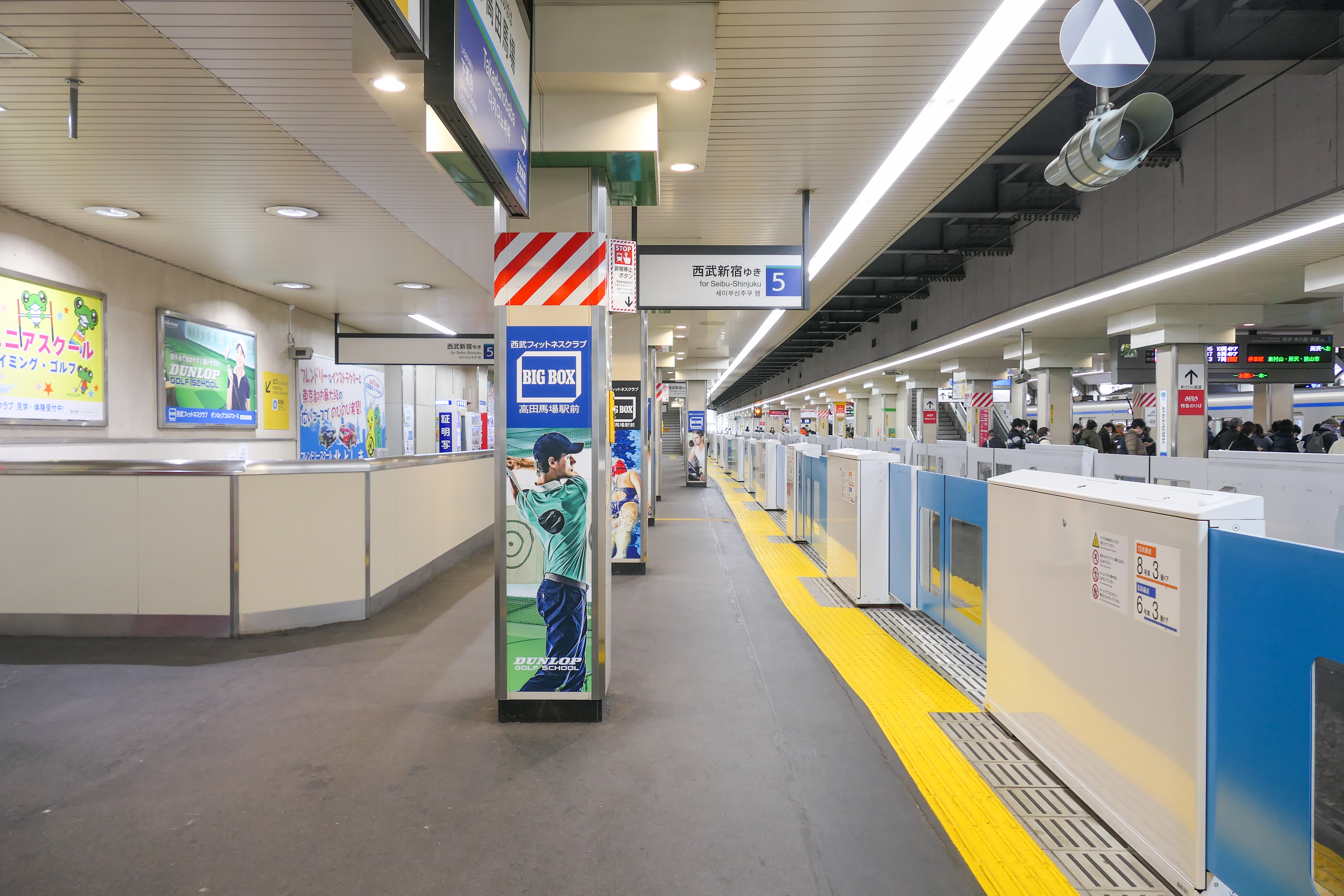
Seibu platform 5

==== Tozai Line ====
It is also relatively close to Nishi-waseda Station on the Tokyo Metro Fukutoshin Line (located 550 meters to the southeast), although it is not officially recognized as a transfer station and there is no transfer corridor between the two stations.

1	Tozai Line	for Ōtemachi, Tōyōchō, Nishi-Funabashi; Chuo-Sobu Line for Tsudanuma; Toyo Rapid Railway Line for Tōyō-Katsutadai
2	Tozai Line	for Nakano; Chuo-Sobu Line for Mitaka

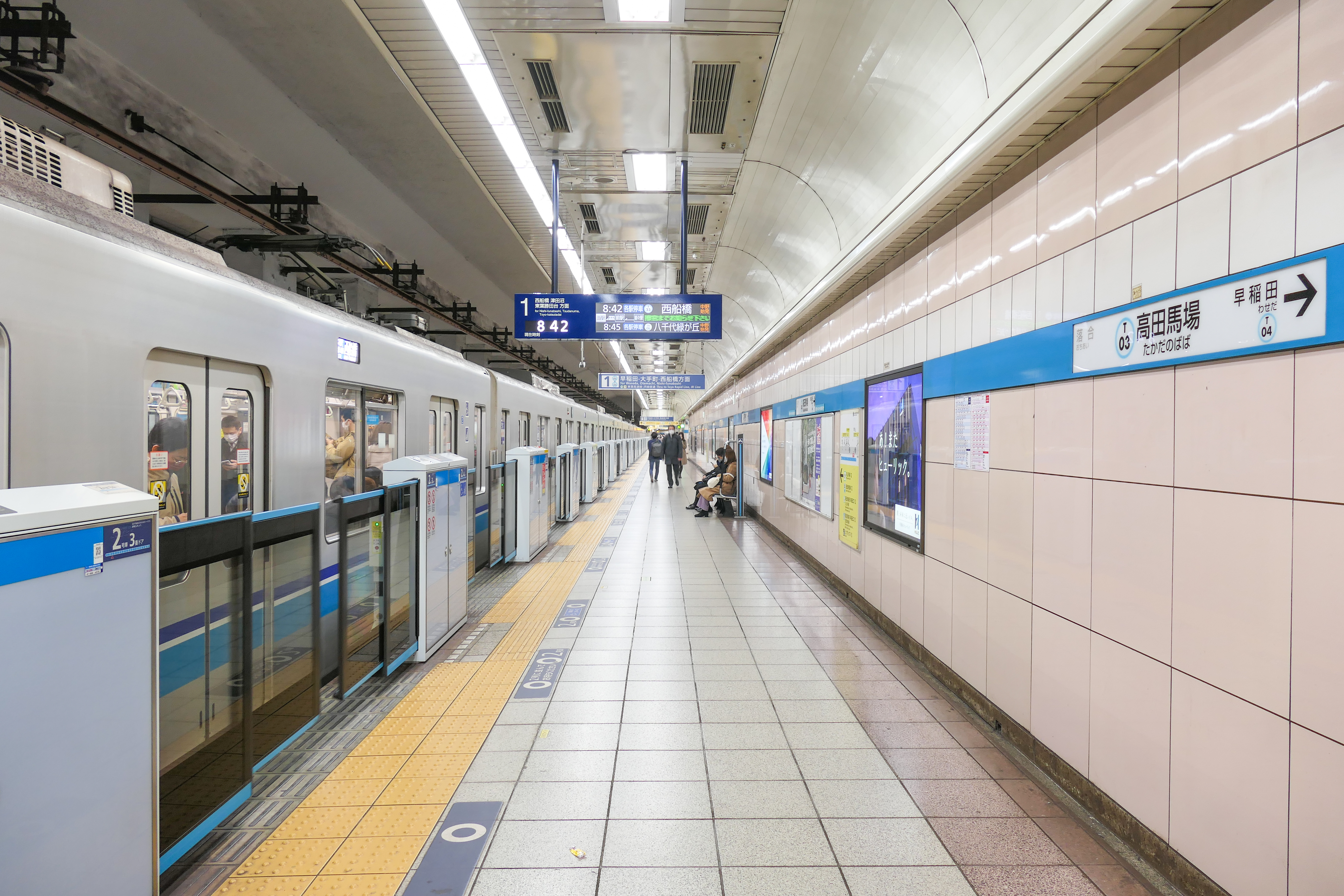
Tozai Line platform 1

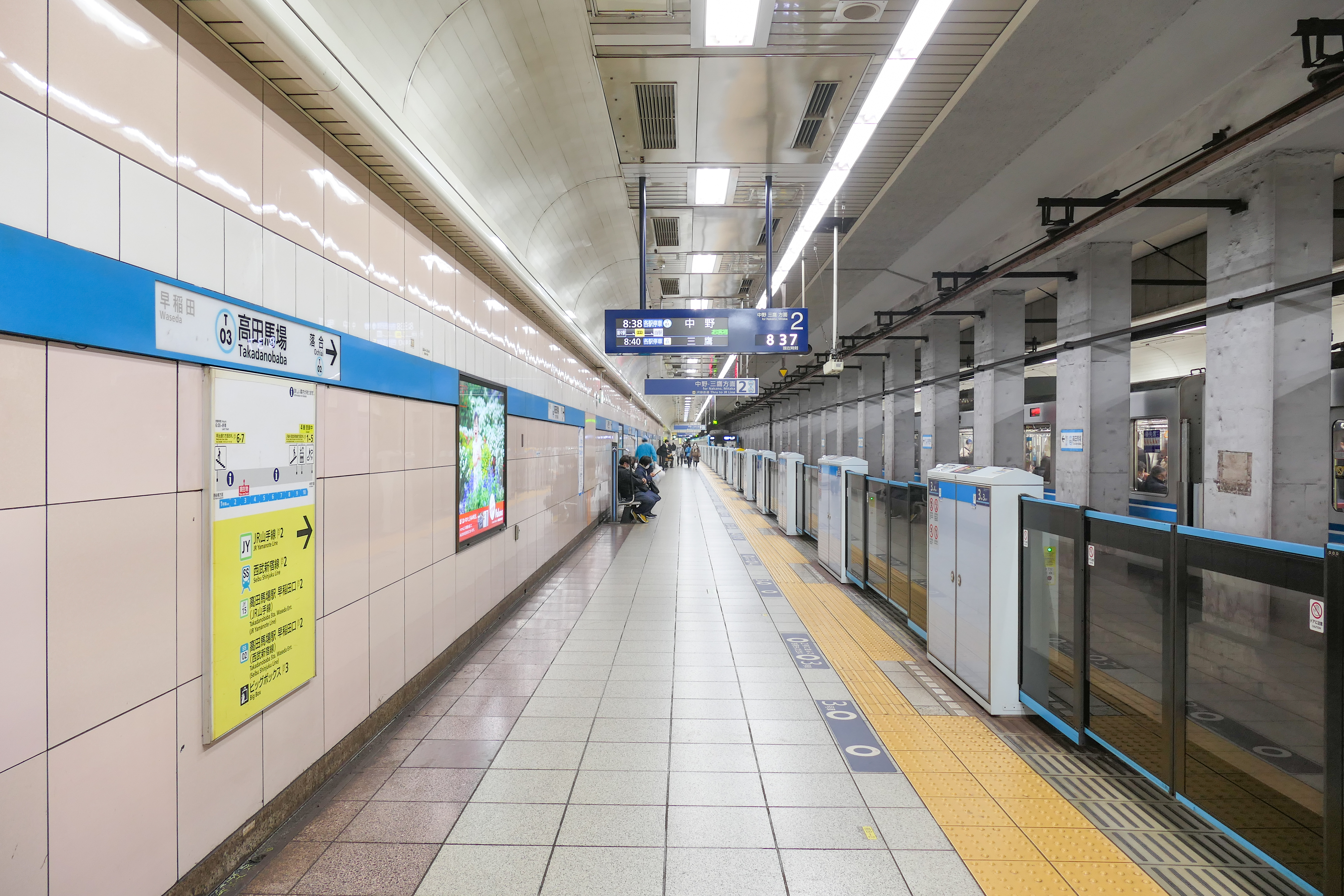
Tozai Line platform 2

== History ==
The Yamanote Line station opened on 15 September 1910.

Seibu Railway opened a temporary station perpendicular to the Yamanote Line in April 1927, followed by a permanent station parallel to the Yamanote Line in April 1928. The original station buildings were burned to the ground during the bombing of Tokyo in April 1945. Takadanobaba was the Tokyo terminal of the Seibu Railway Murayama Line (now Seibu Shinjuku Line) until it was extended to Seibu-Shinjuku Station in 1952.

The Tozai Line began service to Takadanobaba in December 1964 under the auspices of the Teito Rapid Transit Authority (TRTA). Takadanobaba was the western terminus of the Tozai Line until the connection to Nakano Station and the Chuo Main Line opened in March 1966.

The station facilities of the Tozai Line were inherited by Tokyo Metro after the privatization of the Teito Rapid Transit Authority (TRTA) in 2004.

Station numbering was introduced on all Seibu Railway lines during fiscal 2012, with Takadanobaba being assigned station number SS02. Numbering was expanded to the JR East platforms in 2016 with the Yamanote Line station being assigned station number JY15.

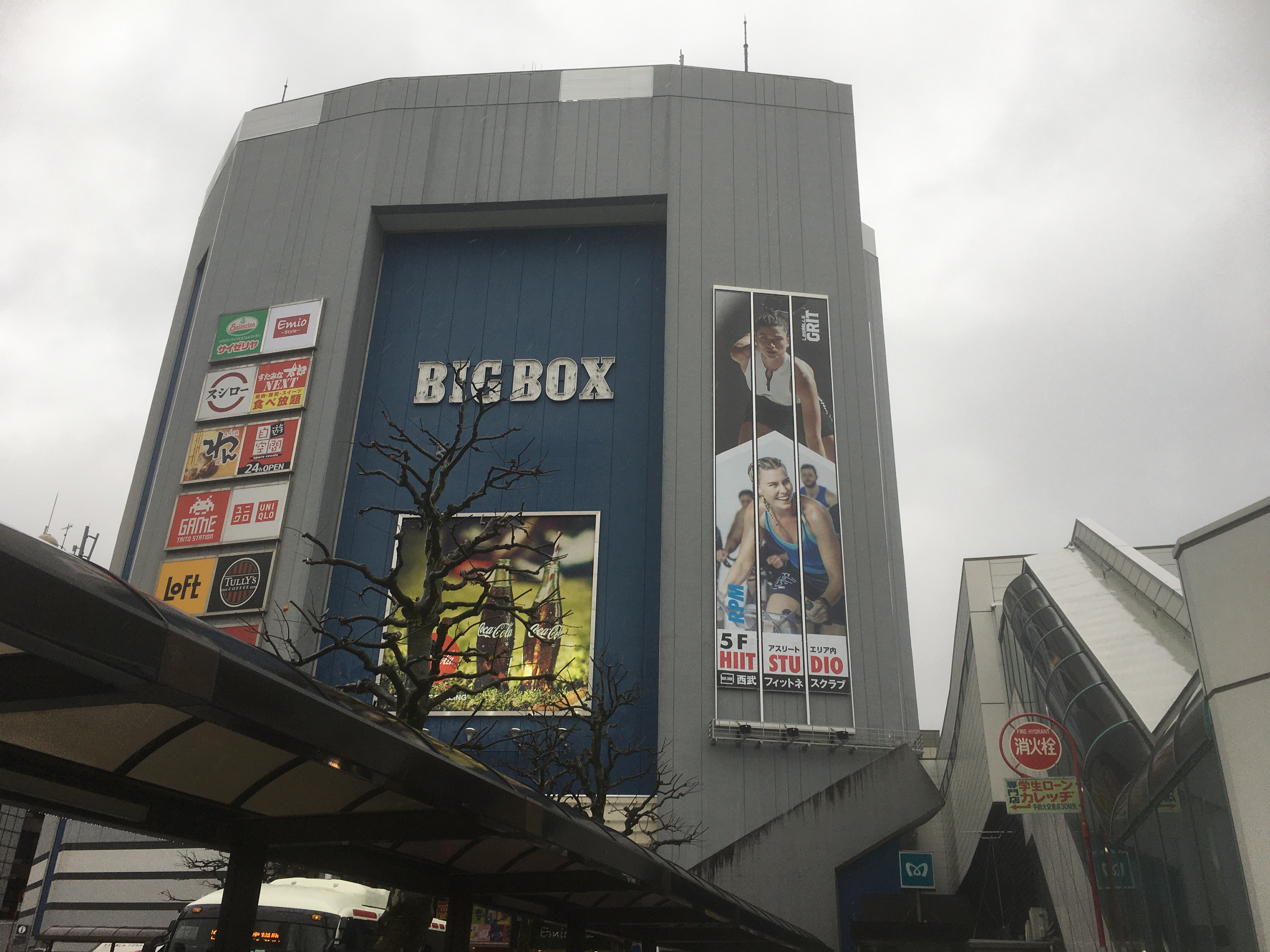
The Big Box building, 2021

== Surrounding area ==
The surrounding area of Takadanobaba is often referred to as "Baba". It lacks the history of nearby Waseda and Mejiro, often conjuring up images of a student spot with its many cheap bars and izakaya serving the needs of students at nearby Waseda and Gakushuin universities.

The symbol of Takadanobaba is the monolithic and appropriately named Big Box building next to the station. Big Box houses a sports gym, swimming pool, Uniqlo clothing store, cafe, bowling alley, arcade, and a fast food restaurant. It has recently been reopened after an extensive renovation.

== Passenger statistics ==
Daily average passenger figures for each operator are as shown below.

Fiscal year	Seibu	JR East	Tokyo Metro
2000		211,761	
2005	274,488	201,936	
2009	299,736	204,527	
2010	295,689	202,396	
2011	287,513	199,741	
2012	292,612	201,765	186,629
2013	292,694	201,513	189,308

- Note that JR East figures account for boarding passengers only.

== See also ==
- List of railway stations in Japan
- Transportation in Greater Tokyo
