= Kōkū-kōen Station =

Railway station in Tokorozawa, Saitama Prefecture, Japan

SS23 Kōkū-kōen Station 航空公園駅
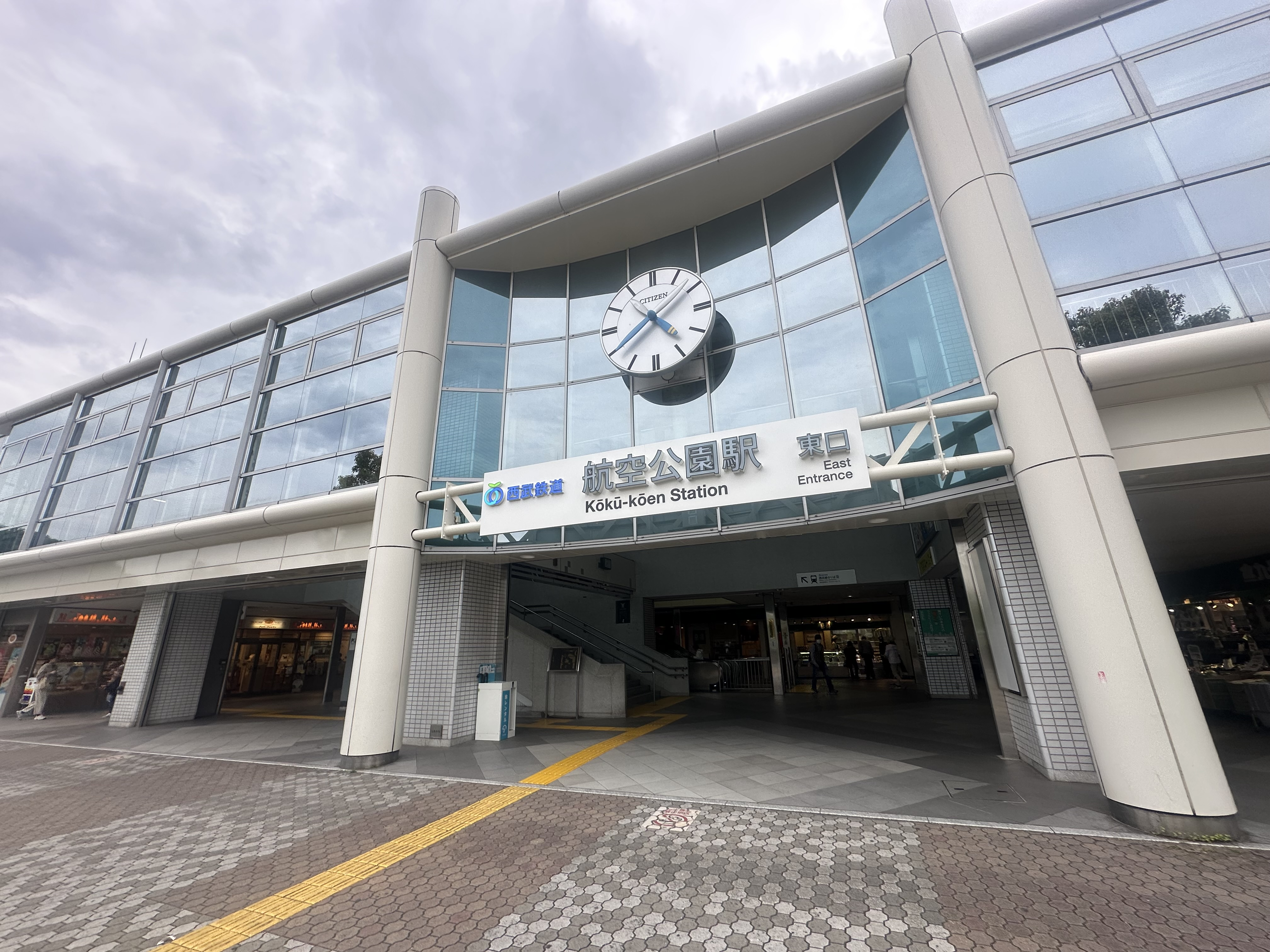
- Kōkū-kōen Station east entrance, May 2025

General information
- Location: 2-4-1 Namiki, Tokorozawa-shi, Saitama-ken 359-0042; Japan
- Coordinates: 35°47′54.91″N 139°27′56.30″E
- Operator: Seibu Railway
- Line: Seibu Shinjuku Line
- Distance: 30.5 km from Seibu-Shinjuku
- Platforms: 2 side platforms
- Tracks: 2
- Connections: Bus terminal

Other information
- Station code: SS23
- Website: Official website

History
- Opened: 28 May 1987

Passengers
- FY2019: 24,494 daily

Services
Preceding station	Seibu Railway	Following station
Shin-Tokorozawa SS24 towards Hon-Kawagoe	Shinjuku Line Express Semi Express Local	Tokorozawa SS22 towards Seibu-Shinjuku
Location
- Location within Saitama Prefecture Location within Japan

Kōkū-kōen Station (航空公園駅, Kōkū-kōen-eki; "Aviation Park Station") is a passenger railway station located in the city of Tokorozawa, Saitama, Japan, operated by the private railway operator Seibu Railway.

== Lines ==
Kōkū-kōen Station is served by the Seibu Shinjuku Line between Seibu-Shinjuku Station in Tokyo and Hon-Kawagoe Station in Kawagoe, and is located 30.5 km from the Seibu-Shinjuku terminus. All trains except Koedo limited express and Commuter express services stop at this station.

== Station layout ==
Kōkū-kōen Station has two entrances, east and west, with the ticket vending on the third level.

The exterior of the whole three-storied station building is designed to look like a "Henri Farman" biplane, 1910's Farman III, which is the first official powered aircraft in Japan, the clock, above the entrance, as its propeller, and was selected as one of the top 100 Train Stations of the Kantō region by MLIT in 1998.

Several stores, such as Henri Farman Bakery & Cafe, Hōrindō Book store, and Senba21 Supermarket, are located in the station building.

=== Platforms ===
The station consists of two side platforms serving two tracks. Platform 1 is for trains heading towards Hon-Kawagoe Station and platform 2 is for trains heading towards Seibu-Shinjuku Station.

1	Seibu Shinjuku Line	for Hon-Kawagoe
2	Seibu Shinjuku Line	for Tokorozawa and Seibu-Shinjuku

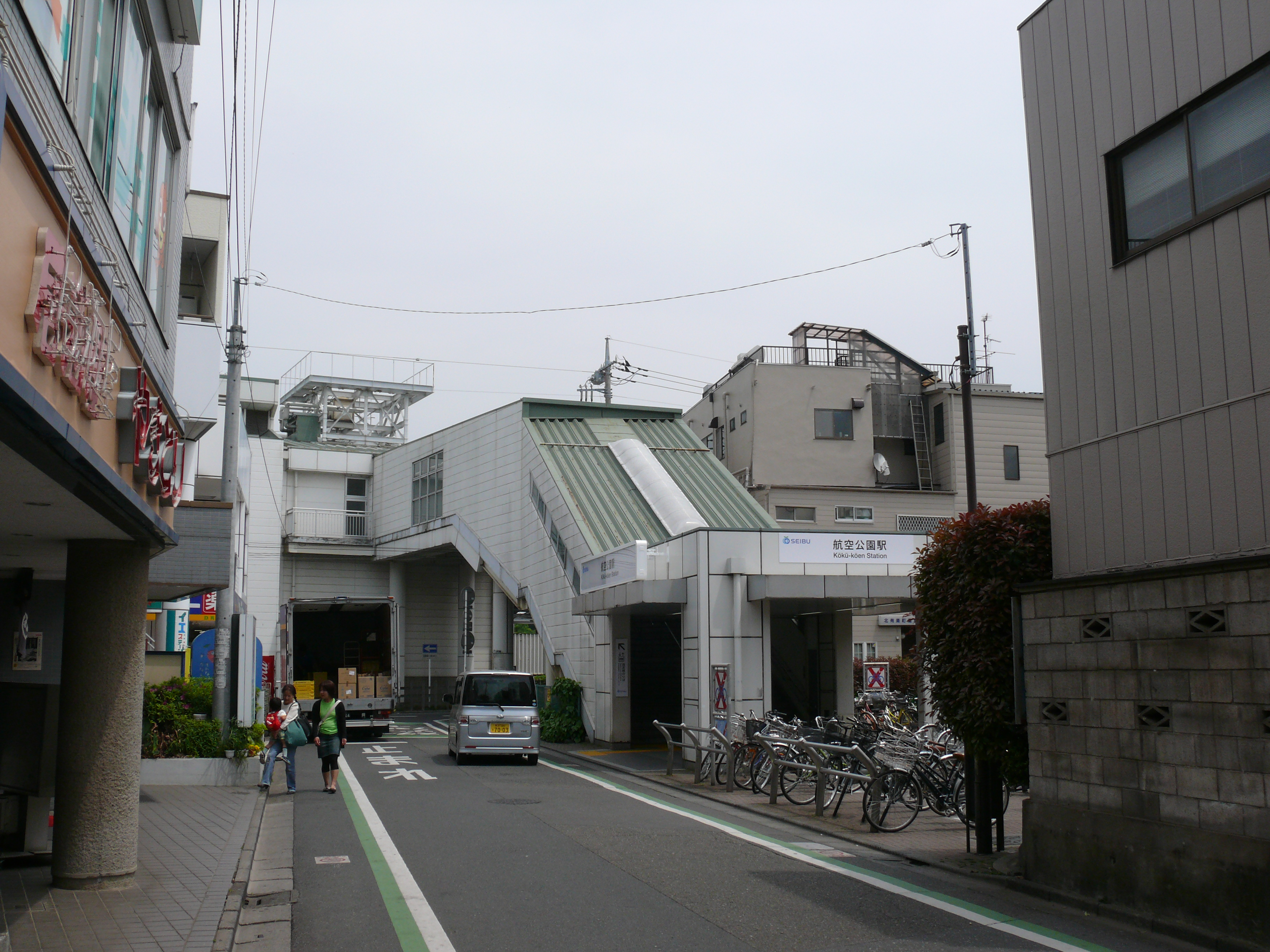
Kōkū-kōen Station West Entrance

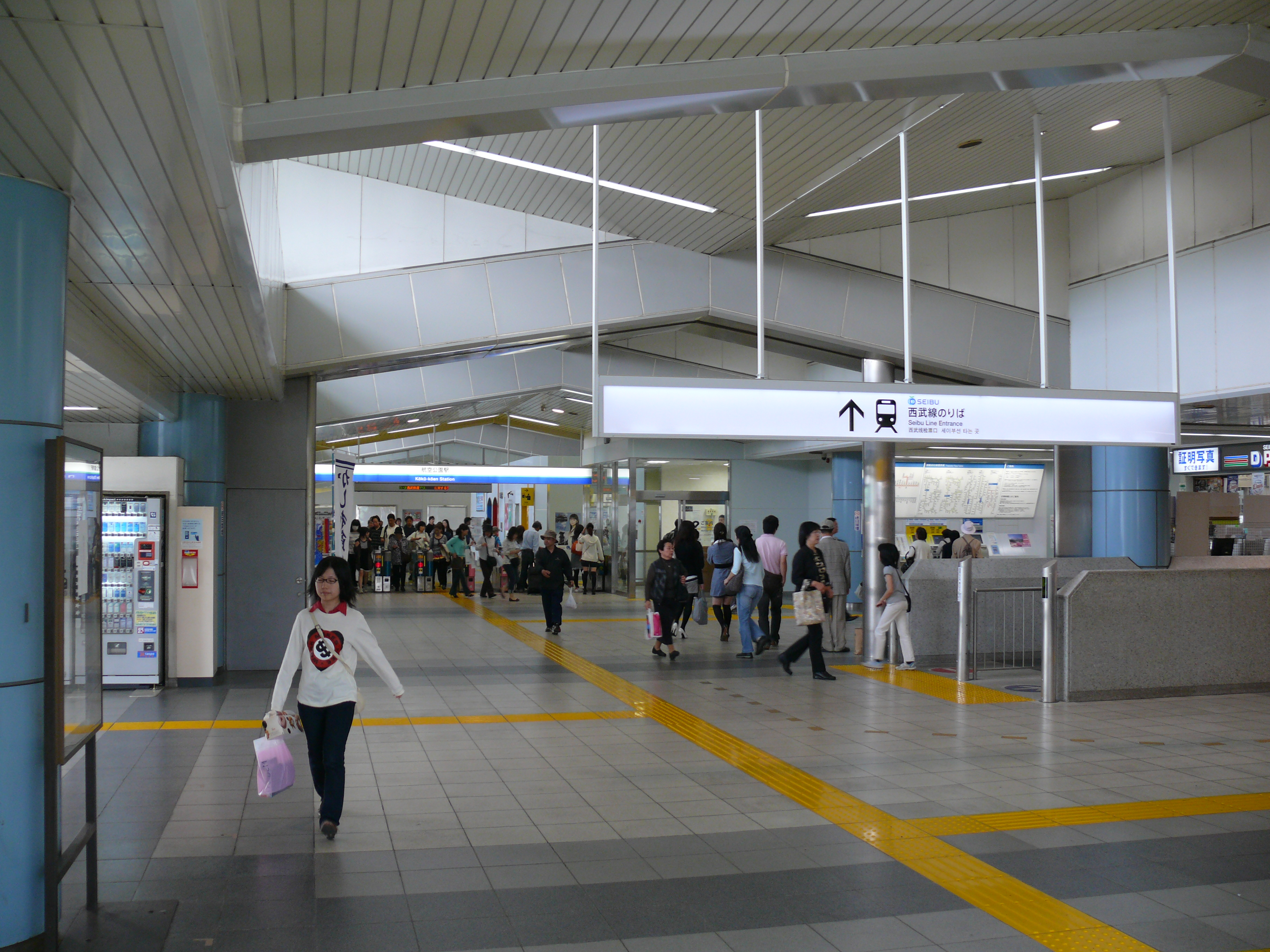
Kōkū-kōen Station interior view

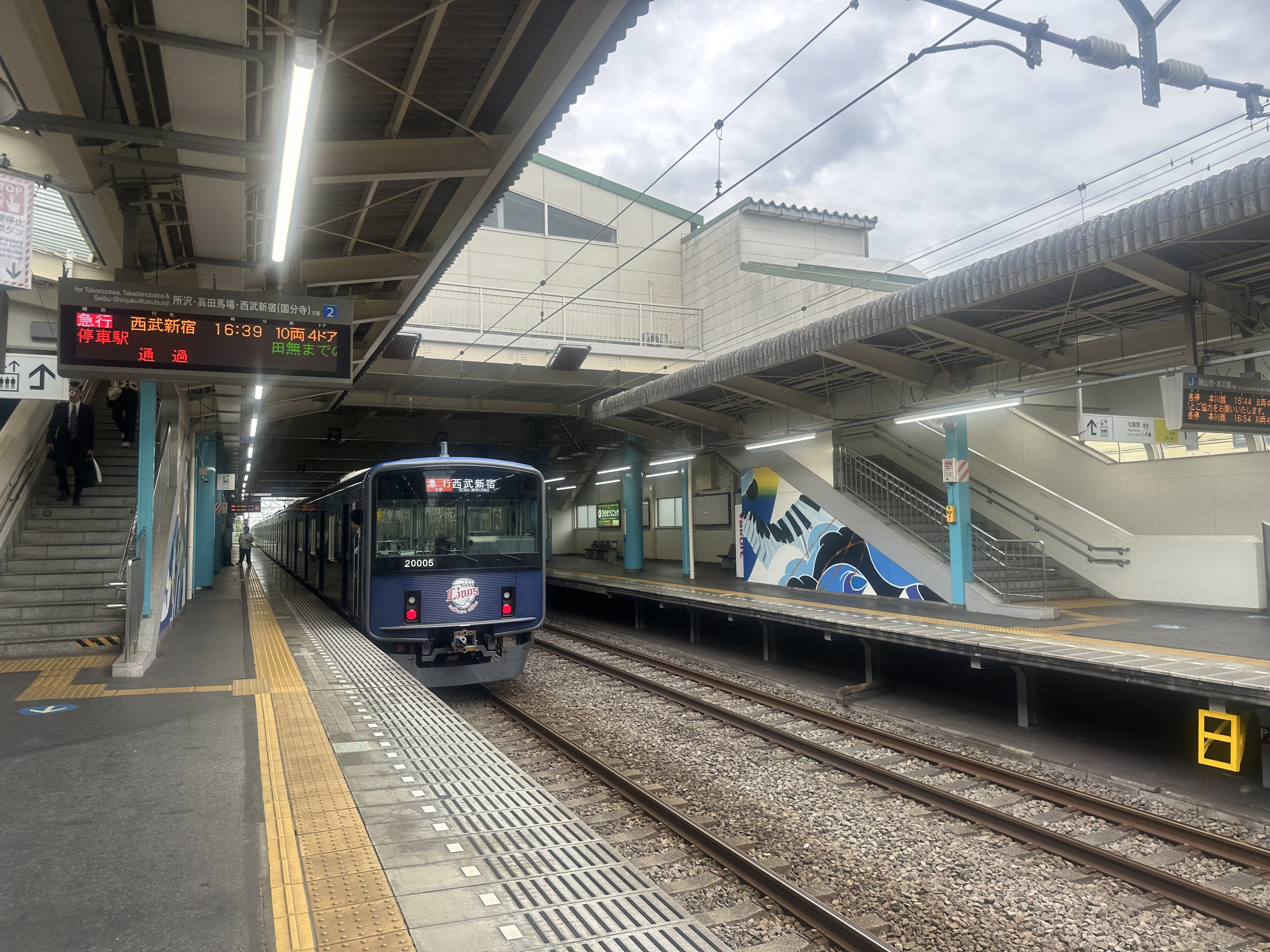
Kōkū-kōen Station platform

== History ==
The station opened on 28 May 1987.

Station numbering was introduced on all Seibu Railway lines during fiscal 2012, with Kōkū-kōen Station becoming "SS23".

== Passenger statistics ==
In fiscal 2019, the station was the 46th busiest on the Seibu network with an average of 24,494 passengers daily.

The passenger figures for previous years are as shown below.

Fiscal year	Daily average
2009	28,373
2010	27,450
2011	27,399
2012	27,648
2013	28,076

== Surrounding area ==
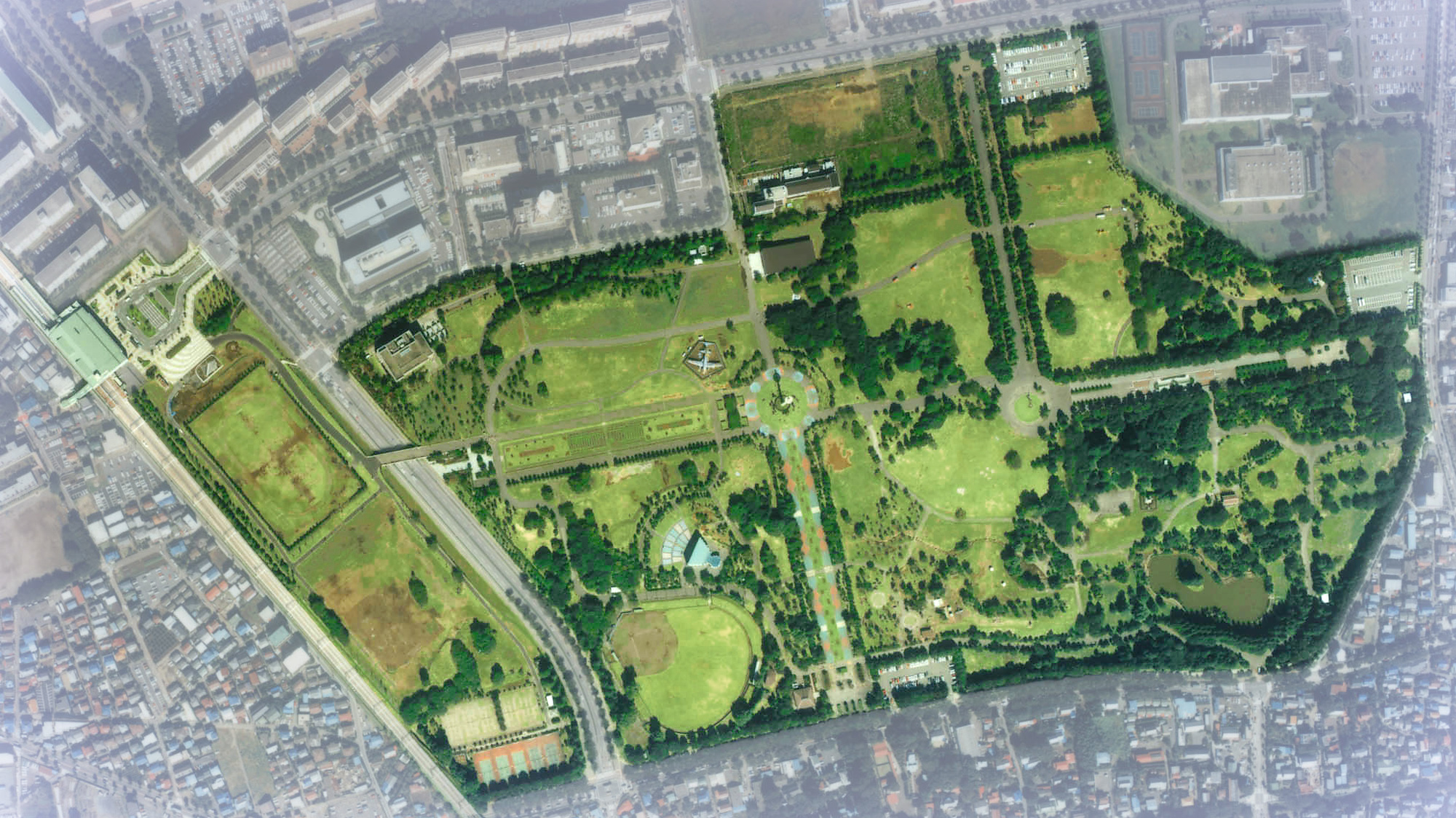
An aerial view of the station and park area to the east

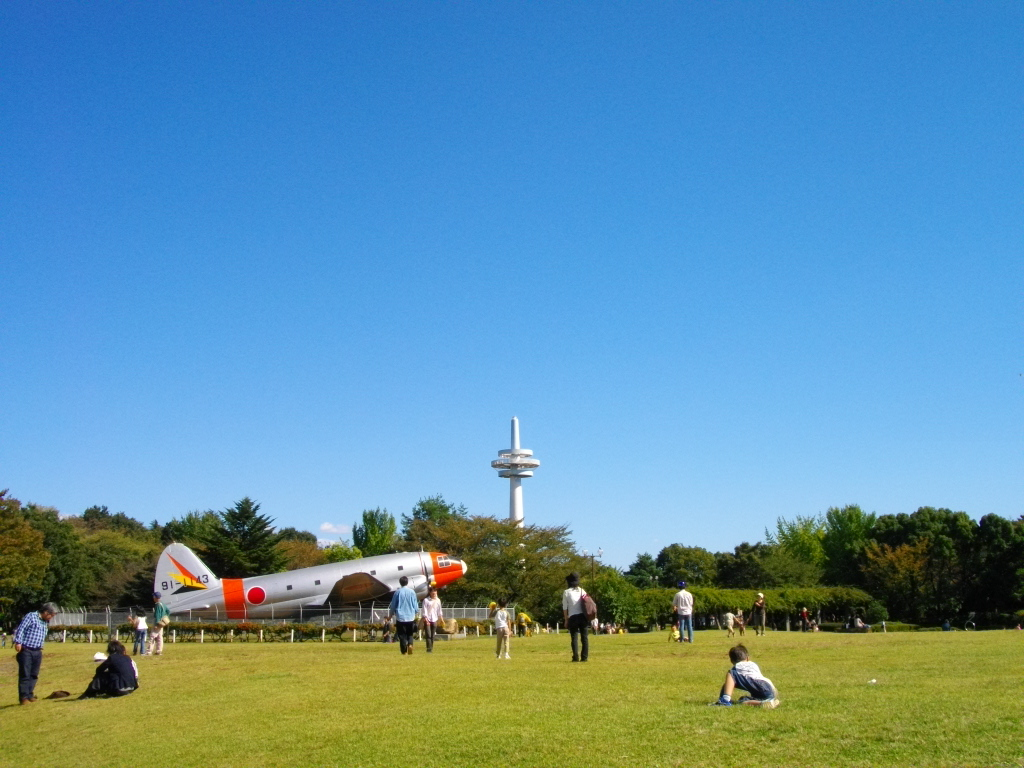
Tokorozawa Aviation Memorial Park (Kōkū-kōen)

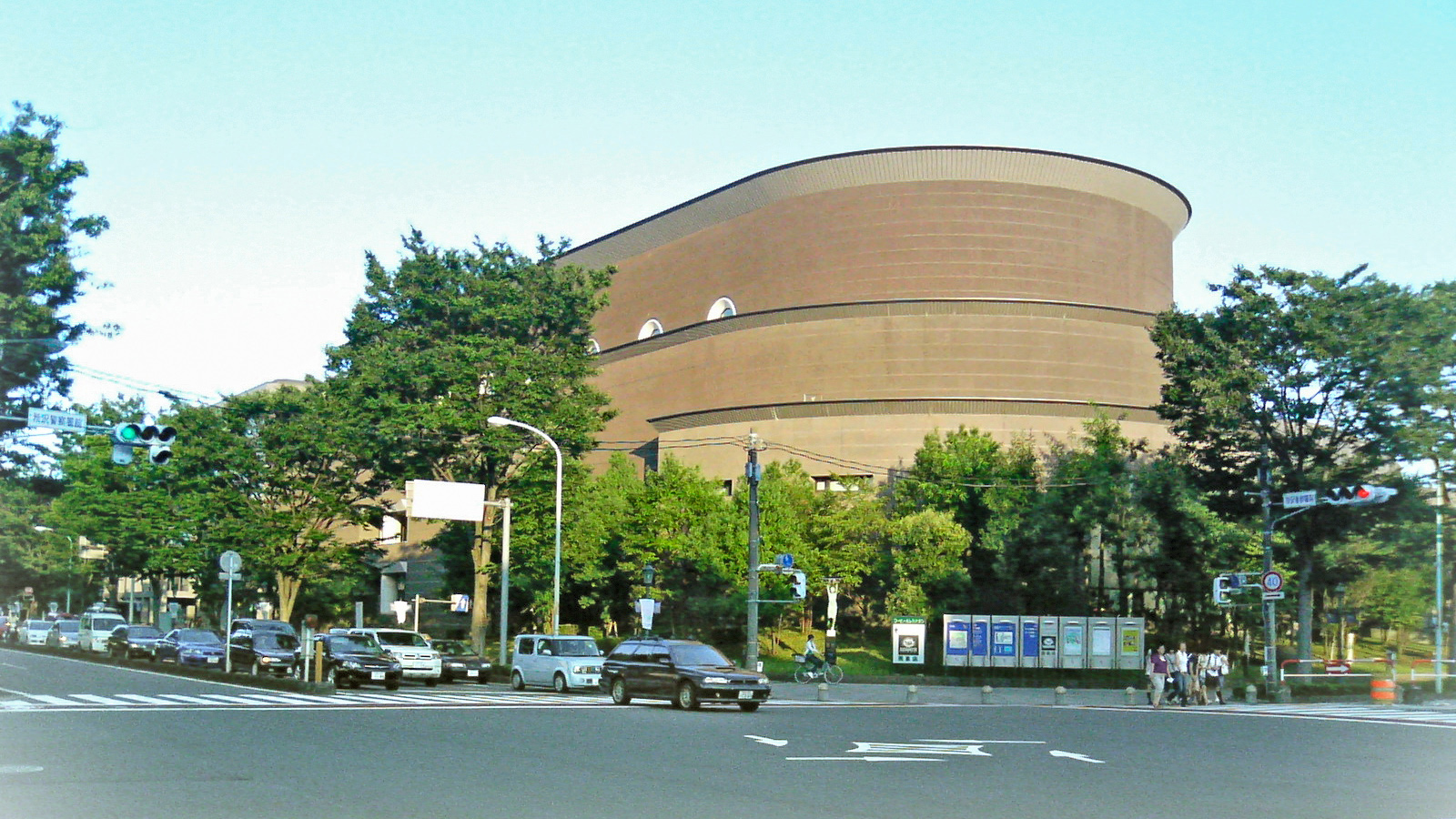
Tokorozawa Civic Cultural Centre Muse

To the east of the station is:

- Tokorozawa Aviation Museum and Tokorozawa Aviation Memorial Park
- YS-11 (Retired aircraft on display)
- Tokorozawa City Hall (local government office building)
- Tokorozawa Central Post Office
- Tokorozawa Police Station
- Tokorozawa Public Employment Security Office
- Tokorozawa Labor Standards Inspection Office
- Tokorozawa District Public Prosecutor's office
- Tokorozawa Tax office
- Saitama District Legal Affairs Bureau, Tokorozawa Branch
- Tokorozawa City Library
- National Defense Medical College
- National Rehabilitation Center for Persons with Disabilities (NRCD)
- Environmental Investigation Laboratory
- Child Guidance Clinic
- TEPCO Tokyo Office
- Tokyo Aeronautical Traffic Control Center
- Tokorozawa Summary Court
- Tokorozawa Civic Cultural Centre Muse (concert hall complex)

To the west of the station is:

- Tokorozawa Public Health Center
- Tokorozawa City Water Works Office
- Tokorozawa City Fire Department
- Heartia Tokorozawa (cultural hall, in Moto-machi, opened in spring 2010)
- Tokorozawa Shimmei-sha Shrine
- Tokorozawa Aikido Dojo

== See also ==
- List of railway stations in Japan
