= Tokorozawa Aviation Memorial Park =

Park in Tokorozawa, Saitama Prefecture, Japan

- 所沢航空記念公園
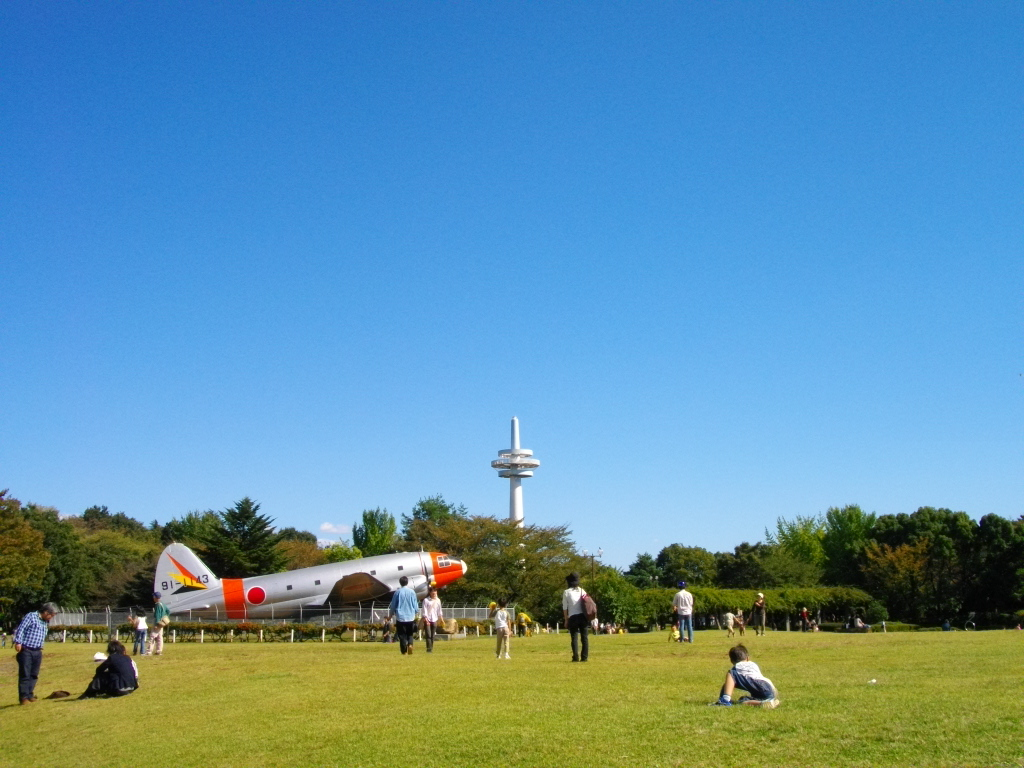

- Location within Japan
- Location: Tokorozawa, Saitama, Japan
- Coordinates: 35°47′52.96″N 139°28′26.92″E
- Created: March 1978
- Public transit: Kōkū-kōen Station
- Website: www.parks.or.jp/tokorozawa-kokuu

Tokorozawa Aviation Memorial Park (所沢航空記念公園, Tokorozawa Kōkū Kinenkōen) is a park located in Tokorozawa, Saitama Prefecture in Japan. It contains the Tokorozawa Aviation Museum and is the birthplace of Japanese aviation as it is the site of Japan's first airfield.

== Overview ==
This park, the largest of the prefectural parks in Saitama Prefecture, has a total area of 50.2 ha and was developed on the site of Tokorozawa Airfield, Japan's first, which opened in 1911 before the Second World War. Since its opening, independent facilities have been constructed within the grounds.

Today, the park is home to a variety of facilities, including the Tokorozawa Aviation Museum, Tokorozawa City Library, a Japanese garden and teahouse called Saishotei, an outdoor stage, tennis courts, a baseball field and a dog run.

Additionally, a running course (1.95 km in circumference ) has been set up on the sidewalks within the park, with a special red carpet-like surface laid over the asphalt to reduce strain on the knees, and footlights are turned on at night, making the course a consideration for runners.

== History ==
The park is built on the former site of Tokorozawa Airfield, Japan's first, which was opened on April 1, 1911. Japan's first plane, the Kaishiki biplane No.1, made its first flight at Tokorozawa on October 13, 1911. Nagaoka Tonofumi, known as the father of Japanese aviation, used his own money to purchase land and build Japan's first airfield. On April 5 of the same year, a French biplane Henri Farman, piloted by Captain Tokugawa Yoshitoshi, flew at an altitude of 10m, a distance of 800m, and a flight time of 1 minute 20 seconds. After this, the Imperial Japanese Army Air Force used the airport as Tokorozawa Army Airfield.

After the Second World War (1945), the area was taken over by the US military and turned into the US military Tokorozawa Communications Base. About 60% of the land was returned in 1971, leaving only the communications facilities. Part of the former base site (about 50ha) was developed as a prefectural park, which opened in 1978.

== Timeline ==
- April 1, 1911 - Opened as Japan's first airfield.
- November 17, 1912 (Taisho 1) - Emperor Taisho visits Tokorozawa Airfield.
- January 15, 1919 (Taisho 8) – Colonel Faure and the French Aviation Training Corps arrive in Japan.
- World War II: During the war, the area was used as a training area for Japanese pilots
- August 1945 (Showa 20) - After the end of the war, the site was taken over by the US military.
- March 12, 1967 – The Tokorozawa Air Base Complete Return Movement Citizens March was held, with 4,115 citizens and others participating.
- June 30, 1971 - 60% of the former Tokorozawa Supply Depot site is returned, leaving only the communications base.
- March 1974 - Approximately 50 hectares of the base are planned as a prefectural park.
- March 30, 1978 (Showa 53) - Park Opened.
- May 1, 1980 - The main building of Tokorozawa City Library opens on the park grounds.
- May 28, 1987 - Koku-koen Station on the Seibu Shinjuku Line opens.
- April 1993 - Tokorozawa Aviation Memorial Museum opens on the park grounds.
- October 25, 1997 - YS-11 aircraft is put on outdoor display in front of Koku-koen Station.
- June 12, 1999 - The teahouse "Saishotei" opens on the premises.
- February 2005 - A dog run is opened on a trial basis by volunteers.
- March 3, 2008 - Celebrating the 30th anniversary of the opening of the gardens, the flower beds and other facilities of the sunken tea garden on the former runway site were renovated.

== Gallery ==
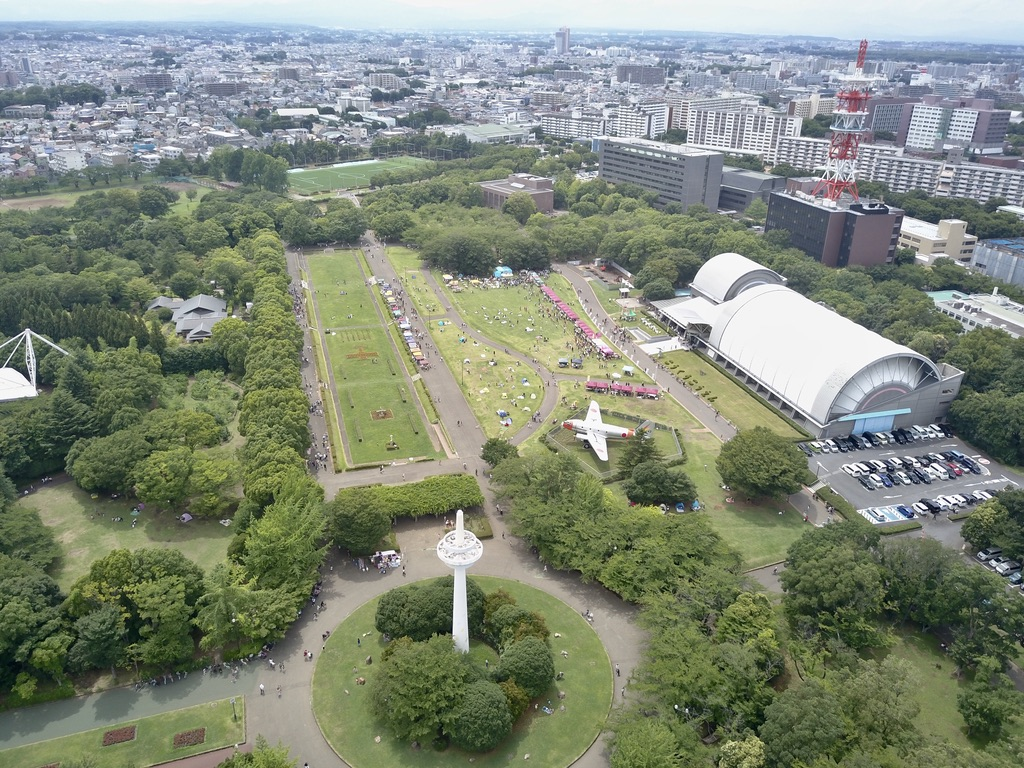
Aerial View of the Tokorozawa Aviation Memorial Park.

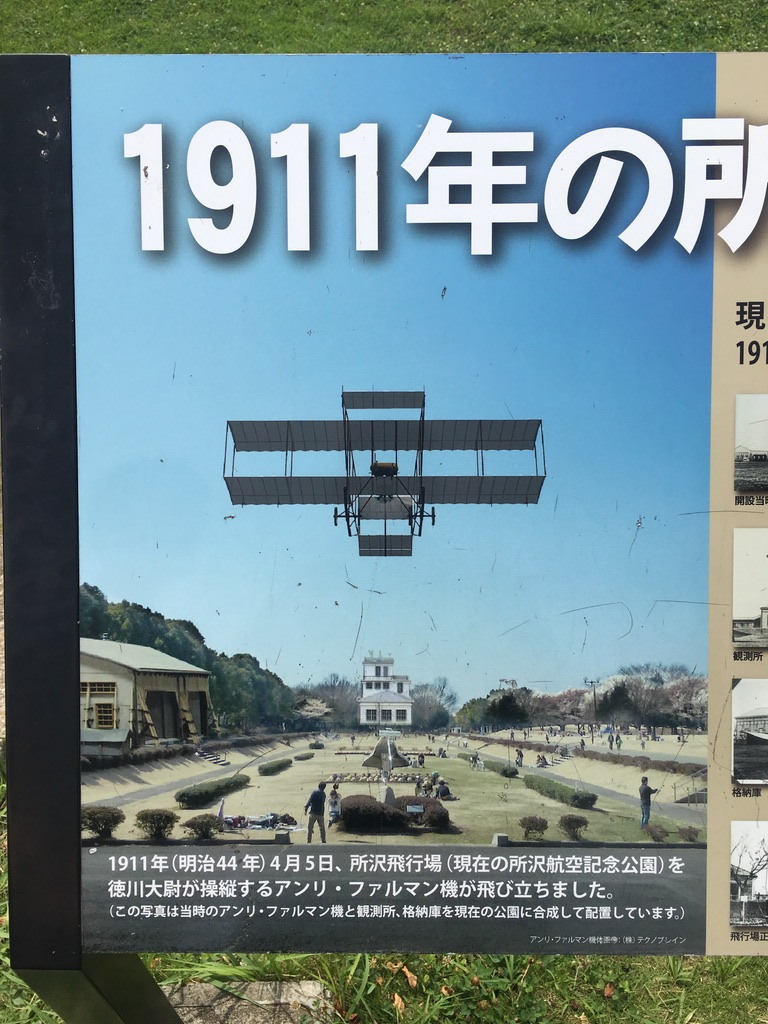
Commemorative Sign illustrating the first flight from the airfield in 1911

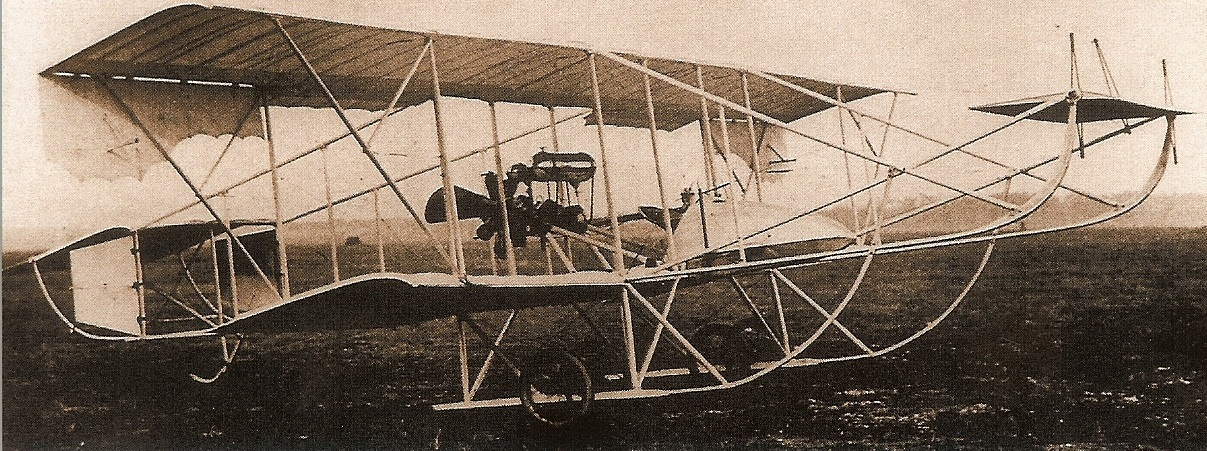
First Plane in Japan (the Henri Farman).

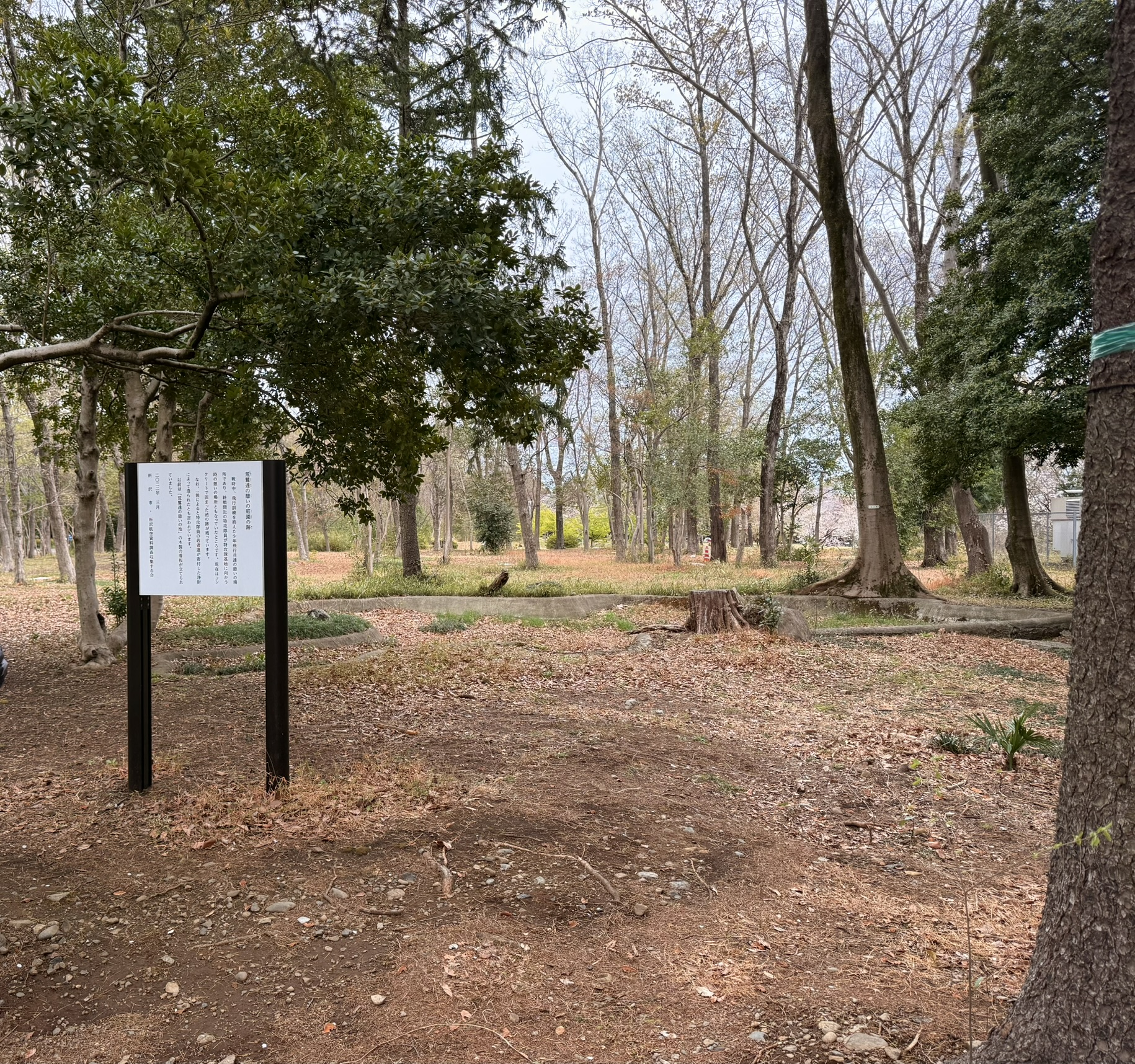
Rest area for World War Two Japanese Pilots including Kamikaze

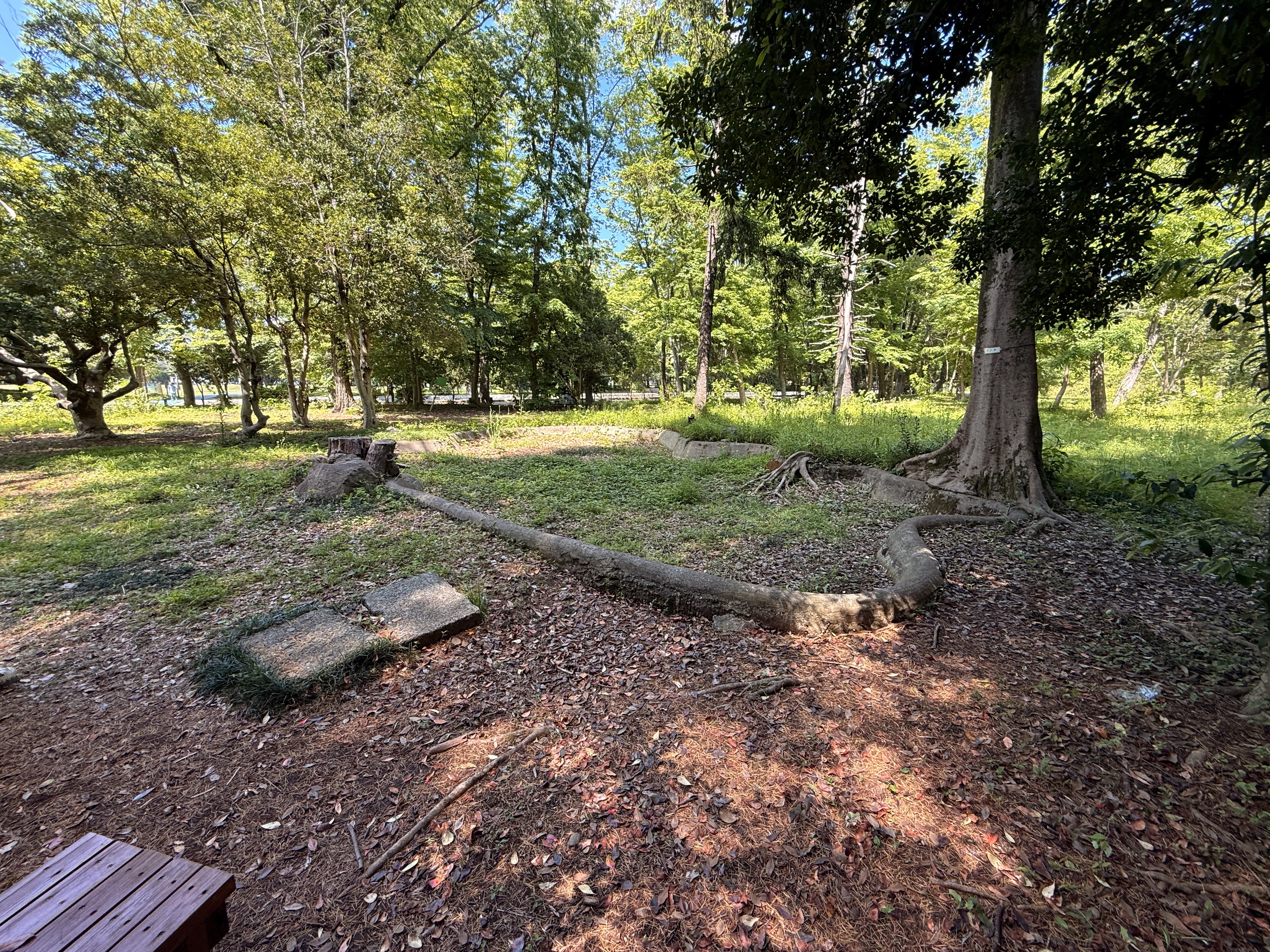
Remains of a rest area for WWII Japanese pilots during training including Kamikaze

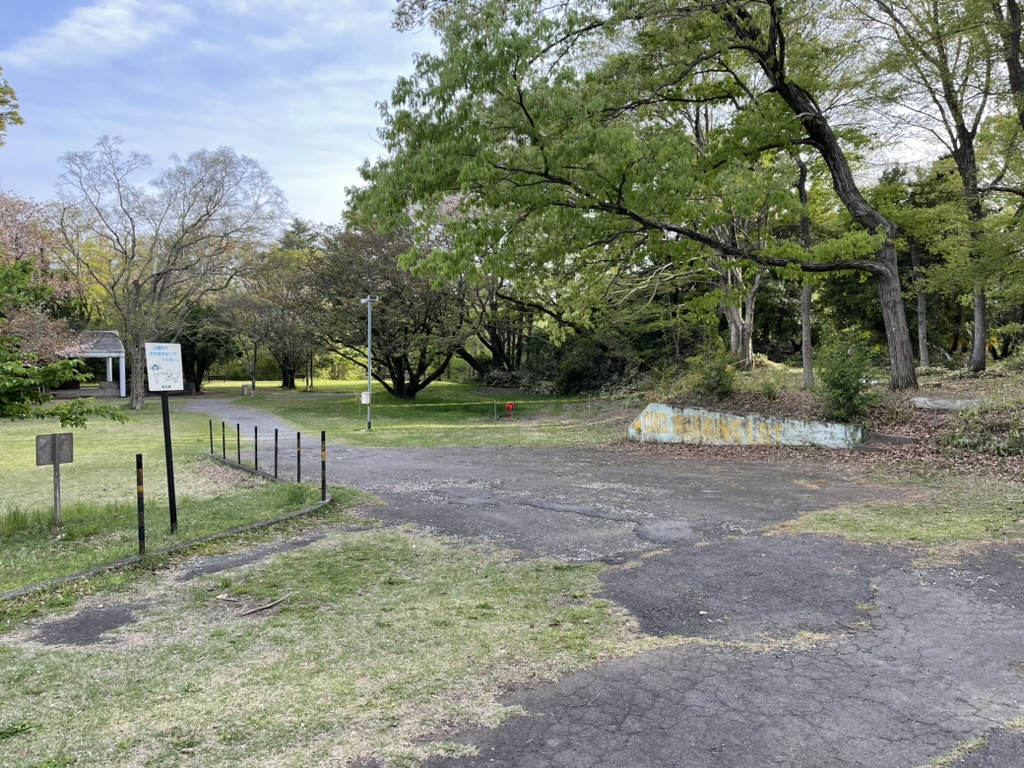
Remains of the American military base club parking
