= 15 August 1945 air combat over Tokyo area =

On 15 August 1945, during a carrier strike against targets in the Tokyo area, six F6F Hellcats of Fighter Squadron VF-88 of the USS Yorktown aborted an attack on Atsugi Airfield after the ceasefire message was broadcast.

As Lieutenant Howard "Howdy" Harrison prepared to reverse course over Tokorozawa Airfield, an estimated 17 Japanese aircraft attacked the American fleet from above and behind. The Japanese included aircraft of the 302nd Kōkūtai, based at Atsugi, which had sent eight Mitsubishi A6M Zeros under Lieutenant Yutaka Morioka and four Mitsubishi J2M3 Raiden fighters.

Harrison and his pilots turned to meet the attack, maneuvering into a head-on combat and opening fire. During the initial pass, the Americans believed that they had shot down four Japanese aircraft, but the formations broke apart and the combat developed into a free for all.

Lt. (j.g.) Maurice Proctor took up a protective position near Lt. (j.g.) Joseph Sahloff, whose Hellcat had been damaged. The Japanese attacked Proctor but Lt. (j.g.) Theodore Hansen drove them away. Proctor and Hansen observed two Japanese planes burning but could not determine who had shot them down.

Proctor was then suddenly attacked by six Japanese planes from ahead and from behind. Proctor shot the aircraft down on his nose and subsequently escaped through the clouds despite being hit. After reaching the coast, Proctor saw Sahloff's damaged aircraft spiral into the sea. Unable to locate the other members, he attempted to arrange a rendezvous by radio, but only Hansen responded.

Hansen returned to the USS Yorktown believing himself to be the only survivor, but Proctor landed a few minutes later. In the debrief, Hansen claimed three Japanese aircraft and Proctor claimed two. The intelligence officer credited one victory each to the missing pilots Sahloff, Harrison, Ensign Wright Hobbs and Ensign Eugene Mandeberg.

Postwar records show that the 302nd Kōkūtai lost one Zero and two Jacks. The only confirmed Japanese success went to Morioka, who achieved ace status on the last day of combat.

The engagement over Tokorozawa has been described as "World War II's last substantial air battle."
