= Farman MF.8 =

1910s French aircraft

MF.8

General information
- Type: Tourism biplane
- Manufacturer: Farman Aviation Works
- Designer: Maurice Farman

History
- First flight: 1913

The Maurice Farman MF.8 was a biplane floatplane, with a pusher engine, designed and built in France circa 1913.

== Specifications ==
Data from

General characteristics

- Crew: 2
- Length: 9.74 m (31 ft 11 in)
- Wingspan: 19.02 m (62 ft 5 in)
- Height: 3.90 m (12 ft 10 in)
- Empty weight: 967 kg (2,132 lb)
- Gross weight: 1,367 kg (3,014 lb)
- Powerplant: 1 × Renault 8C V-8 air-cooled piston engine, 100 kW (130 hp)

Performance

- Maximum speed: 100 km/h (62 mph, 54 kn)
