= Farman HF.7 =

1910s French reconnaissance aircraft

HF.7
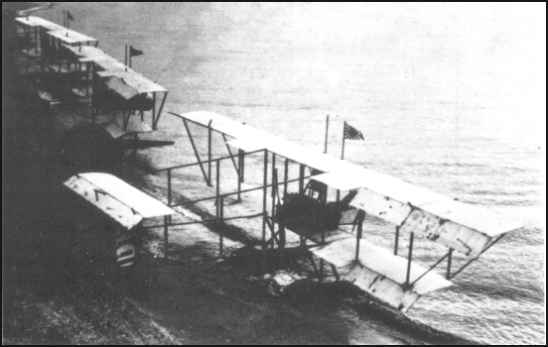

General information
- Type: Reconnaissance aircraft
- Manufacturer: Farman
- Designer: Henri Farman

History
- First flight: 1912

The Farman HF.7 was a reconnaissance aircraft built in France shortly before the First World War.

== Specifications ==
Data from

General characteristics

- Crew: 2 (pilot and observer)
- Length: 8.70 m (28 ft 7 in)
- Wingspan: 12.05 m (39 ft 6 in)
- Height: 3.10 m (10 ft 2 in)
- Wing area: 28 m^{2} (300 sq ft)
- Empty weight: 370 kg (816 lb)
- Max takeoff weight: 560 kg (1,235 lb)
- Powerplant: 1 × Gnome 7-cylinder air-cooled rotary piston engine, 37 kW (50 hp)
- Propellers: 2-bladed fixed-pitch wooden pusher propeller

Performance

- Maximum speed: 90 km/h (56 mph, 49 kn)
- Wing loading: 20.0 kg/m^{2} (4.1 lb/sq ft)
- Power/mass: 0.08 hp/kg

== Bibliography ==
- Liron, Jean (1984). Les avions Farman. Collection Docavia. Vol. 21. Paris: Éditions Larivière. OCLC 37146471.
