= Tokorozawa Civic Cultural Centre Muse =

Concert hall complex in Tokorozawa, Saitama, Japan

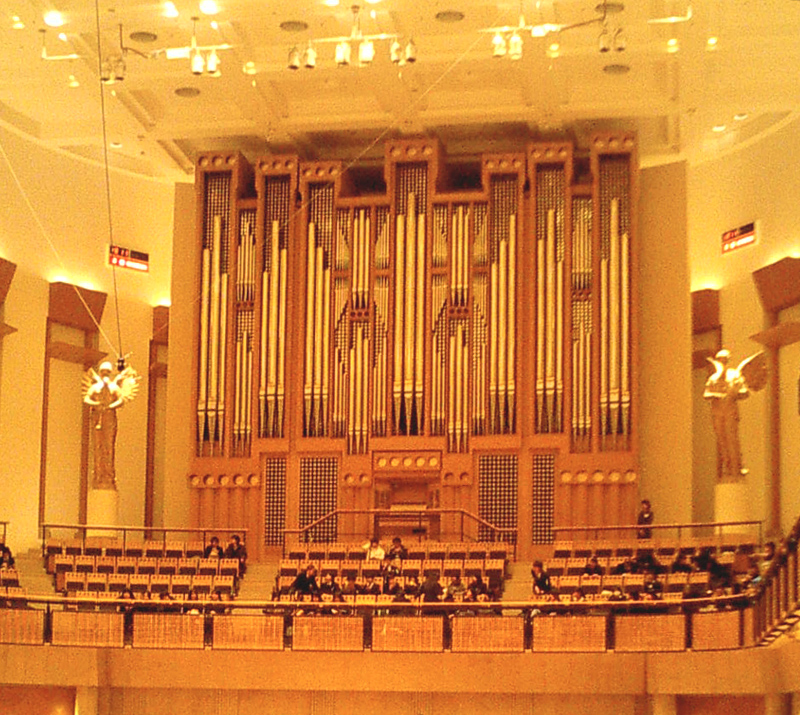
- Interactive map of Tokorozawa Civic Cultural Centre Muse
- Location: 1-9-1 Namiki, Tokorozawa, Saitama, Japan
- Coordinates: 35°48′02″N 139°28′23″E
- Owner: Tokorozawa Cultural Foundation
- Capacity: 3,118; Ark Hall: 2,002; Marquee Hall: 798; Cube Hall: 318
- Type: concert hall drama theatre exhibition gallery

Construction
- Opened: 1993

Website
- www.muse-tokorozawa.or.jp

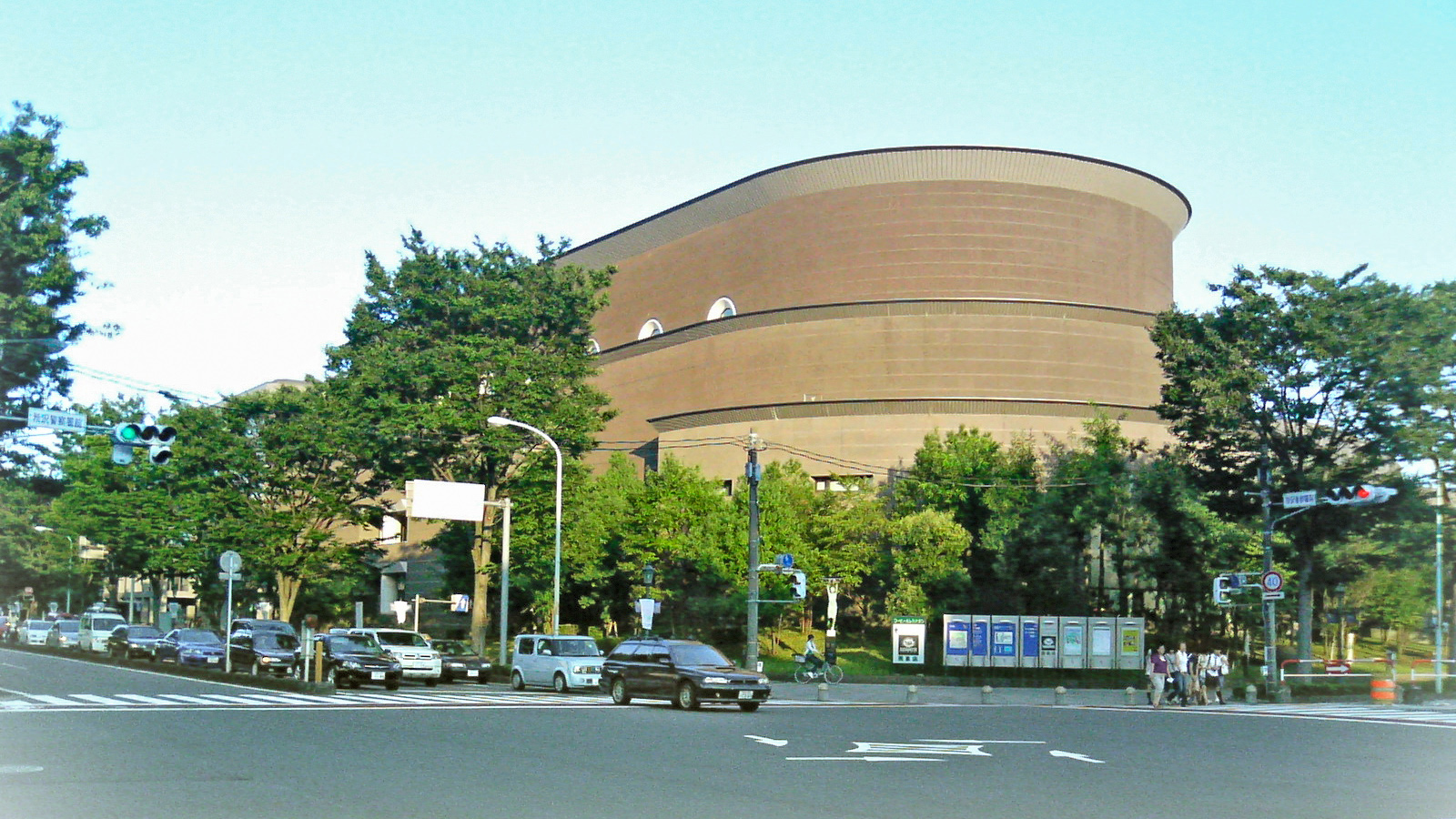
Tokorozawa Muse - Ark Hall

Tokorozawa Civic Cultural Centre Muse (所沢市民文化センター ミューズ, Tokorozawa Shimin Bunka Sentā Myūzu) is a concert hall complex consisting of the main "Ark Hall", with a pipe organ, and other facilities, located in Tokorozawa, Saitama, west of Tokyo, Japan. It opened in 1993, and is operated by the Tokorozawa Cultural Foundation. It is also called "Tokorozawa Muse", or sometimes just "Muse" for short.

== Facilities ==
Ark Hall (large-sized main hall), Marquee Hall (medium-sized hall), Cube Hall (small-sized hall), and The Square (exhibition gallery space), and some other facilities

The Bavarian Radio Symphony Orchestra and Montreal Symphony Orchestra have performed here.

=== Ark Hall ===
2,002-seat symphony hall with a pipe organ, mostly for classical music

==== Pipe organ ====
5,563 pipes / 75 stops, manufactured by Rieger Orgelbau of Austria

=== Marquee Hall ===
798-seat horseshoe-shaped theatre

=== Cube Hall ===
318-seat hall designed for chamber music performances

=== The Square ===
Exhibition gallery space

== Access ==
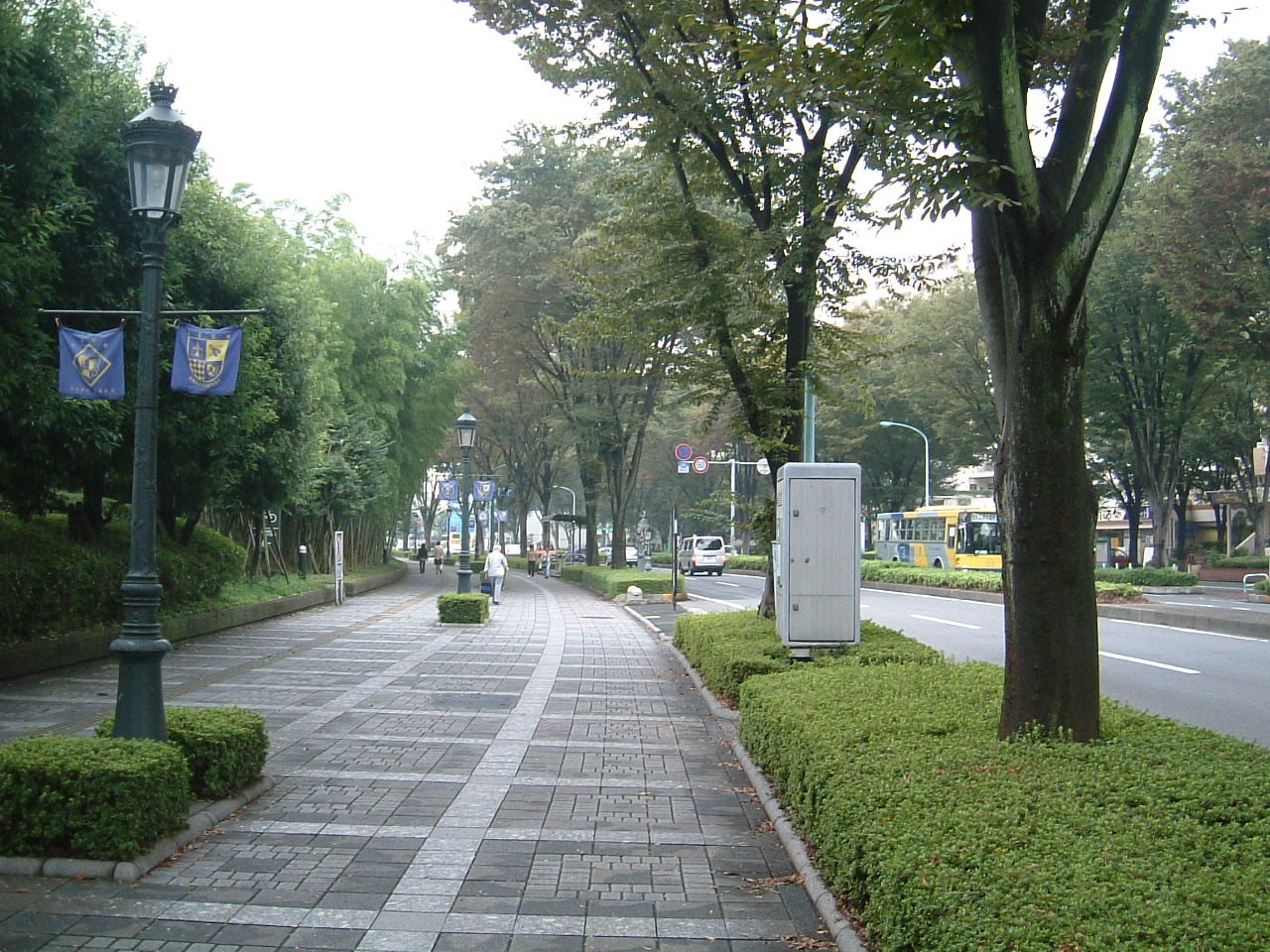
Route to Kōkū-kōen Station

- 8 minutes' walk, or one stop one coin(100yen) ride by bus, from East exit of Kōkū-kōen Station on the Seibu Shinjuku Line, approximately 30 to 45 minutes from central Tokyo.

=== Surrounding area ===
"Muse" is located next to Kōkū-kōen Park, and Tokorozawa Aviation Museum

- Tokorozawa City Library
- Tokorozawa City Office
- Tokorozawa Central Post office
- Tokorozawa Police Station
- Tokorozawa Transmitter Site

== Other uses ==
Concert halls, or sometimes the route to Kōkū-kōen Station, can be seen in some Japanese TV dramas and movies, as they are often used as filming locations.

== See also ==
- List of concert halls
