= Kaishiki No.1 =

Japanese airplane

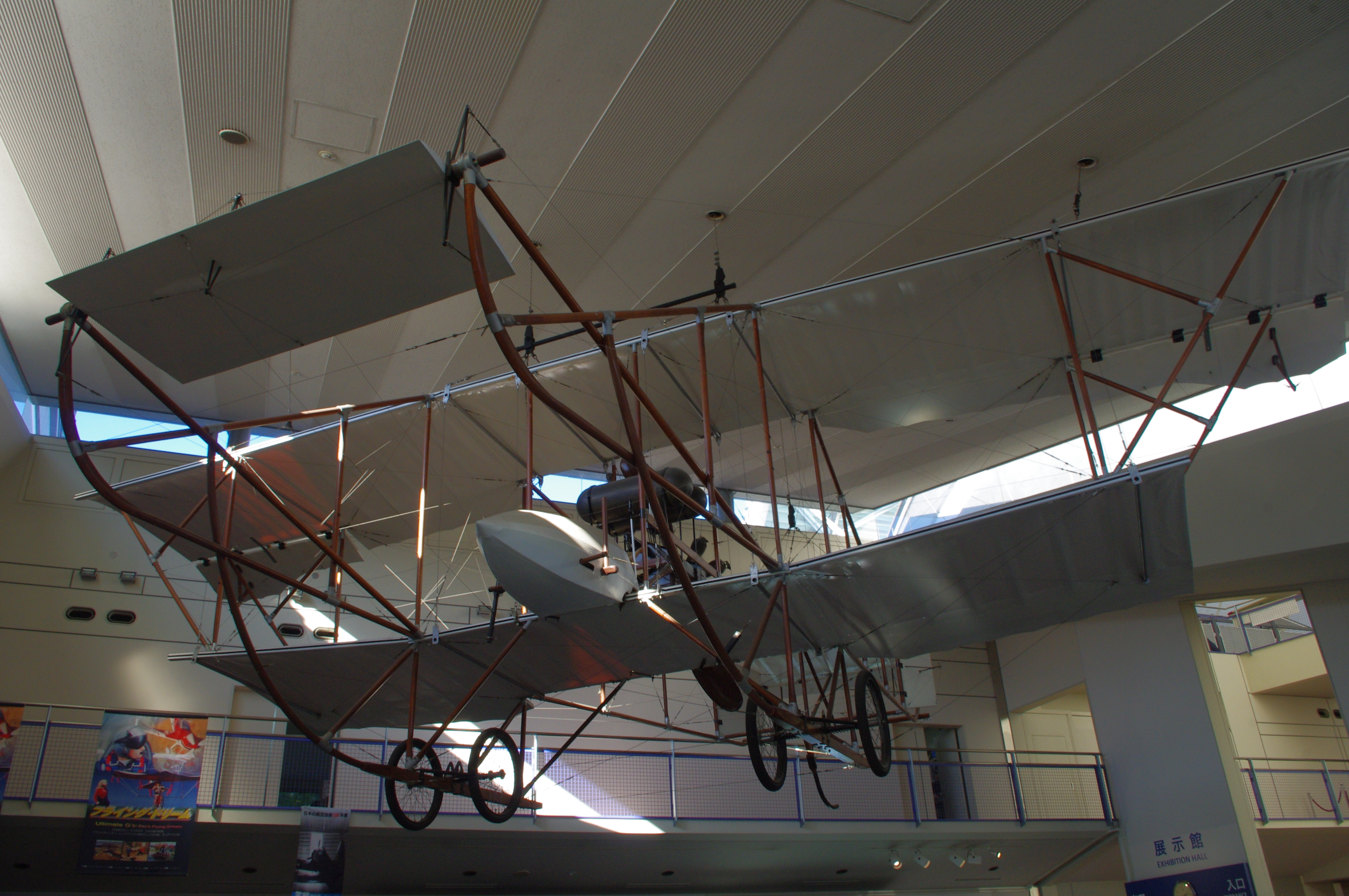
- Replica at Tokorozawa Aviation Museum

General information
- Other name: Kaishiki 1, Kaishiki Biplane 1
- Type: Experimental biplane
- National origin: Japan
- Designer: Yoshitoshi Tokugawa
- Number built: 1

History
- First flight: October 13, 1911
- Developed from: Farman III
- Developed into: Kaishiki No.2-6

The 会式一号機 (Kaishiki No.1, kaishikiichigouki) was the first successful (Note: The civilian designed Narahara No. 2 made a 60 metres (200 ft) flight on 5 May 1911, but crashed on landing when its undercarriage failed.) Japanese-designed and constructed airplane. It was designed by Captain Yoshitoshi Tokugawa and was first flown by him on October 13, 1911, at Tokorozawa in Saitama Prefecture.

There is a replica displayed in the Tokorozawa Aviation Museum, located near the place where the aircraft's first flight took place.

== Specifications ==
Data from Japanese Aircraft 1910–1941

General characteristics

- Crew: 2
- Length: 11.50 m (37 ft 9 in)
- Upper wingspan: 10.50 m (34 ft 5 in)
- Lower wingspan: 8.0 m (26 ft 3 in)
- Height: 3.90 m (12 ft 10 in)
- Wing area: 41.0 m^{2} (441 sq ft)
- Empty weight: 450 kg (992 lb)
- Gross weight: 550 kg (1,213 lb)
- Powerplant: 1 × Gnome Omega 7-cylinder rotary engine, 37 kW (50 hp)
- Propellers: 2-bladed Chauvière

Performance

- Maximum speed: 72 km/h (45 mph, 39 kn)
- Endurance: 3 hr
