= Nakajima Type 91 fighter =

Japanese fighter

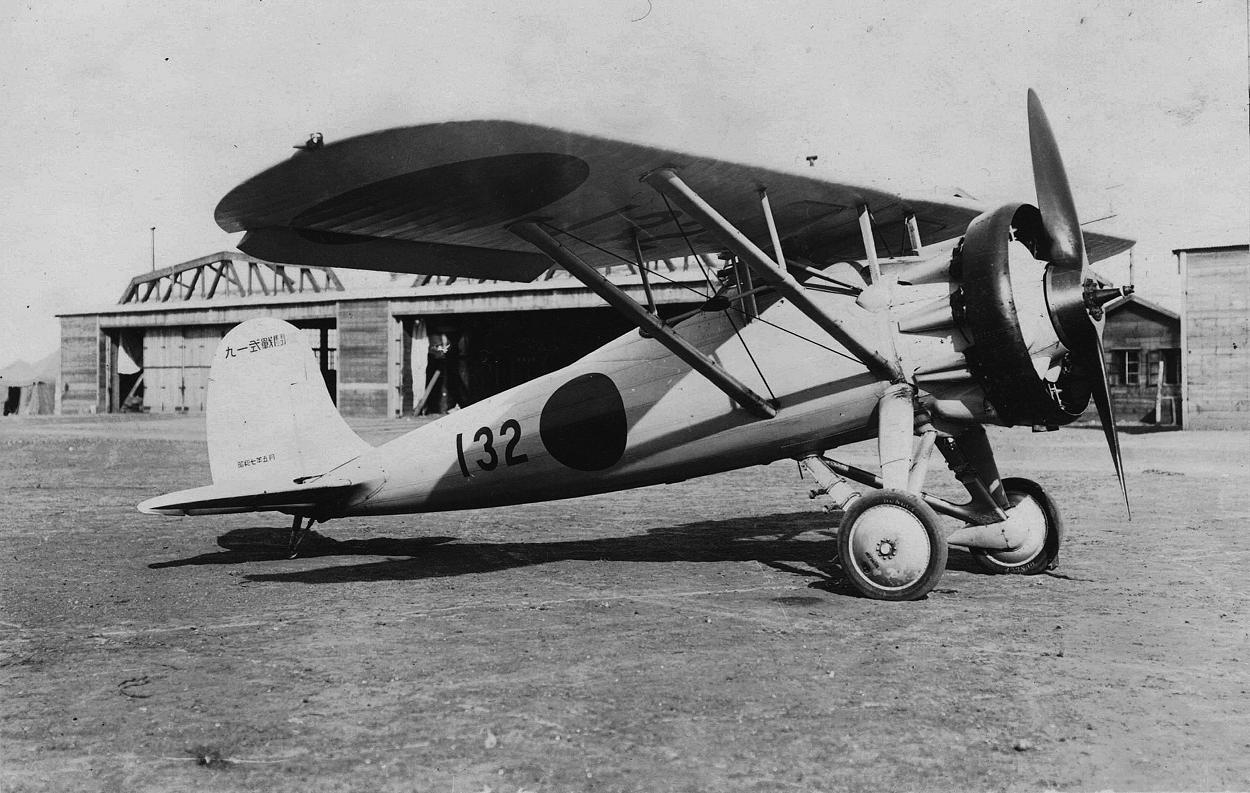

General information
- Type: Fighter
- Manufacturer: Nakajima Aircraft Company
- Primary user: Empire of Japan; Manchukuo
- Number built: 450

History
- Manufactured: 1931-1934
- Introduction date: 1931
- Retired: 1937

The Nakajima Type 91 fighter was a Japanese fighter aircraft of the 1930s. It was a single-engine, single-seat parasol monoplane with a fixed, tailskid undercarriage.

== Development ==
Designed in response to an Imperial Japanese Army requirement of 1927, the Type 91 was developed from the NC series of fighter prototypes. The prototype was the sixth machine under that designation but was a fundamentally distinct airframe design. Compared to the earlier NC, the Type 91 had a smaller wing, relocated fuel tank and wing-bracing struts, Townend ring-type cowling, new design tail and undercarriage. It first flew in 1931.

== Operational history ==
The Army ordered the new aircraft as the Nakajima Army Type 91 fighter and the first deliveries took place late in 1931. However, issues arose with both directional stability and centre of gravity, with the result that the type was delayed entering service.

Between 1931 and 1934, 420 aircraft were constructed (including 100 by Ishikawajima; 23 of the total were Type 91-2, powered by a 432 kW (580 hp) Nakajima Kotobuki 2 radial engine. This version first flew in July 1934.

The type was supplanted in service by the Kawasaki Army Type 95 fighter in 1936–1937.

== Variants ==
Nakajima NC
Prototype and pre-series version, powered by 336 kW (450 hp) Bristol Jupiter radial engine, having a top speed of 268 km/h and larger wing. 8 built.
Nakajima Army Type 91-1 fighter
Main production version, powered by 336 kW - 390 kW (450 hp - 520 hp) Nakajima built Bristol Jupiter radial engine.
Nakajima Army Type 91-2 fighter
Improved version, powered by Nakajima Kotobuki. 21 built.

== Operators ==
China

- The Chinese Nationalist Air Force purchased 12 Type 91-1 fighters which would later end up fighting against the Japanese during the Second Sino-Japanese War.

Japan

- Imperial Japanese Army Air Force

Manchukuo

- Manchukuo Imperial Air Force

== Surviving aircraft ==
The Tokorozawa Aviation Museum in Tokorozawa, Saitama has a fuselage on display. Also, at a gate of Yanagisawa Shrine in Yamatokōriyama in Nara Prefecture there is a propeller preserved.

== Specifications (Nakajima Army Type 91-1 fighter) ==
Data from Japanese aircraft 1910-1941, The Complete Book of Fighters

General characteristics

- Length: 7.27 m (23 ft 10 in)
- Wingspan: 11 m (36 ft 1 in)
- Height: 2.79 m (9 ft 2 in)
- Wing area: 20 m^{2} (220 sq ft)
- Empty weight: 1,075 kg (2,370 lb)
- Gross weight: 1,530 kg (3,373 lb)
- Powerplant: 1 × Nakajima Jupiter VII 9-cylinder air-cooled radial piston engine, 340–390 kW (450–520 hp)
- Propellers: 2-bladed wooden fixed-pitch propeller

Performance

- Maximum speed: 300 km/h (190 mph, 160 kn)
- Endurance: 2 hours
- Service ceiling: 9,000 m (30,000 ft)
- Time to altitude: 3,000 m (9,800 ft) in 4 minutes
- Wing loading: 76.5 kg/m^{2} (15.7 lb/sq ft)
- Power/mass: 0.21 kW/kg (0.13 hp/lb)

Armament

- Guns: 2 × fixed, 7.7mm Type 89 machine guns

== Bibliography ==
- Andersson, Lennart (2008). A History of Chinese Aviation: Encyclopedia of Aircraft and Aviation in China until 1949. Taipei, Taiwan: AHS of ROC. ISBN 978-957-28533-3-7.
- Passingham, Malcolm (January 1994). "Le chasseur Nakajima Type 91" [The Nakajima Type 91 Fighter]. Avions: Toute l'aéronautique et son histoire (in French) (11): 35–44. ISSN 1243-8650.
