= Farman III =

French aircraft design from 1909

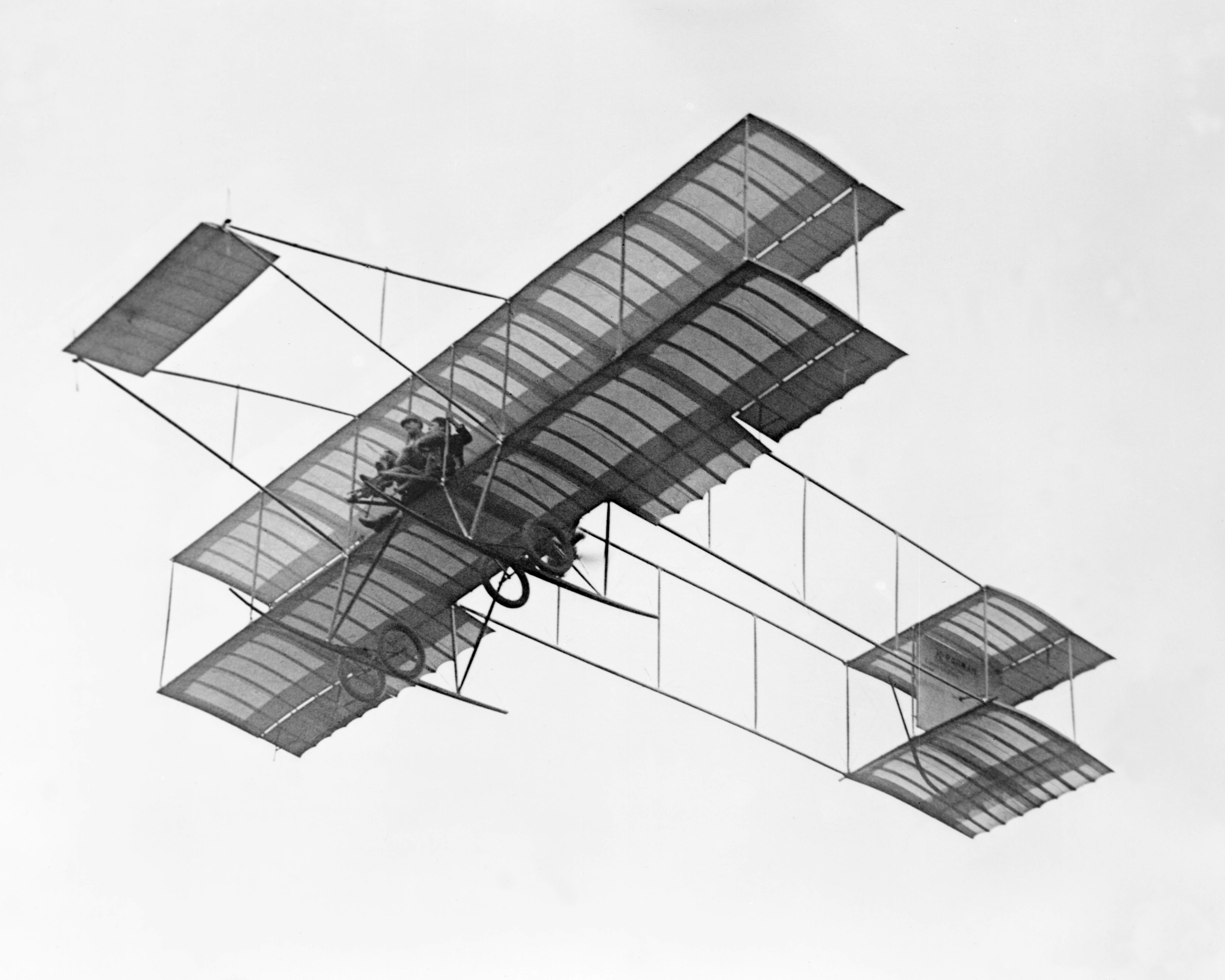
- Louis Paulhan in his Farman III at the Dominguez Field, Los Angeles 1910

General information
- Type: Pusher biplane
- National origin: France
- Manufacturer: Farman
- Designer: Henry Farman

History
- First flight: April 1909

Farman Biplane, ca. 1909

The Farman III, also known as the Henry Farman 1909 biplane, was an early French aircraft designed and built by Henry Farman in 1909. Its design was widely imitated, so much so that aircraft of similar layout were generally referred to as being of the "Farman" type.

== Background ==
Henry Farman's first aircraft had been bought from the Voisin brothers in 1907. Soon after his first flights, Farman began to modify and improve the design of the aircraft, which was known as either the Farman I or Voisin-Farman I. During 1908, Farman re-covered the aircraft with 'Continental' rubberized fabric and added the side-curtains, and it was re-designated the Farman I-bis. Following the Wilbur Wright-piloted flying demonstrations at Le Mans in August 1908, Farman fitted ailerons to the aircraft.

The Voisin brothers built another aircraft, to be called the Farman II, incorporating refinements of the design to Farman's specification. Voisin later sold this aircraft to J.T.C. Moore-Brabazon. Brabazon subsequently exported the aircraft to England, where it became known as the Bird of Passage. This episode angered Farman, and caused him to sever his association with Voisin in early 1909 and to start aircraft construction for himself.

== Design and development ==
The Farman III was, like the Voisin, an equal-span pusher biplane with a single forward elevator and biplane tail surfaces carried on booms. Farman's design eliminated the covered nacelle for the pilot which also carried the elevator in the Voisin; instead, the elevator was mounted on two pairs of converging booms. Lateral control was effected by ailerons on both upper and lower wings. The undercarriage also differed considerably, replacing the original wheel pair with skids, each fitted with a dual-wheel set and using bungee cord and restrained by radius rods.

As first flown in April 1909, the aircraft had vertical fixed surfaces carrying twin rudders on their trailing edges and very broad-chord ailerons. The airframe was made of wood, mainly ash, with members joined using aluminium sockets. Wing and tail surfaces were covered with a single fabric surface, with the ribs and two spars enclosed in pockets. The fixed vertical surfaces had been removed and the ailerons replaced with smaller ones by the time the aircraft appeared at Reims in August 1909. The original engine was a 50 hp (37 kW) 4-cylinder inline water-cooled Vivinus. Henry Farman replaced the engine with the new and more reliable 50 hp (37 kW) Gnome Omega rotary engine while the aircraft was at the Grande Semaine d'Aviation at Reims in August 1909, and the new engine's reliability contributed towards his success there. The aircraft had been entered with the Vivinus engine, and the last-minute engine replacement caused some of his competitors to try to get him disqualified. Production aircraft were fitted with a variety of engines, including the Gnome and the E.N.V. water-cooled V-8 engine. In 1910, the design was modified by adding an elevator to the upper tailplane surface.

The Farman III had enormous influence on European aircraft design, especially in England. Drawings and details of the aircraft were published in England by Flight, and it was so widely imitated that its layout became referred to as the "Farman Type". Among these aircraft were the Bristol Boxkite, the Short S.27 and the Howard Wright 1910 Biplane. The Bristol aircraft was so similar to Farman's design that he considered legal action.

Farman was rewarded by commercial success, and many examples of the type were sold. Farman III aircraft were also built in Germany by the Albatros Flugzeugwerke at Johannisthal as the Albatros F-2.

== Variants ==
- Type de Course

Examples of a racing variant were built in 1910. This had a reduced wingspan, with the upper wing spanning 8.5 m (27 ft 11 in) and a monoplane tail.

- 1910 Michelin Cup biplane

Produced to make an attempt to win the 1910 Michelin Cup long-distance competition, this aircraft had the same basic configuration but differed in having 2.5 m (8 ft 2 in) extensions on the upper wing, giving a total wing area of 70 m^{2} (750 ft^{2}) and a long nacelle to protect the pilot from the cold. Ailerons were fitted only on the upper wing, and fuel and oil tankage was increased to 230 lt and 80 lt respectively to give an endurance of 12 hours.

== Operational history ==
One of the first examples built was bought by Roger Sommer, who only two months after learning to fly set a new French endurance record with a flight of 1 hour 50 minutes on 1 August 1909, bettering this with a flight of 2hr 27min 15sec made a week later; this would have qualified as a new world record had it been officially observed. Sommer later went on to manufacture aircraft himself, his first design derived from the Farman.

Sommer's performance was easily beaten by Henry Farman at the Grande Semaine d'Aviation held in August 1909 at Reims, where Farman won the prize for distance with a flight 180 km (110 mi) in just under 3 hours 5 minutes on 27 August 1909. Farman also won the passenger carrying prize, and came second in the altitude competition.

Two examples took part in the aviation meeting held in Blackpool in September 1909, one flown by Henry Farman and the second by Louis Paulhan, winning first and third prizes for distance flown and first and second prizes in the speed contest. At the end of October 1909, Paulhan made the first exhibition flight at Brooklands in his Farman, watched by a crowd of 20,000 people. In January 1910, Paulhan travelled to America to take part in the 1910 Los Angeles International Air Meet, taking a Blériot XI monoplane and a Farman III. Flying the Farman, he set an altitude record of 1,258 m (4,126 ft) on 12 January 1910.

Henry Farman flew the type to win the International Michelin Cup with a flight of 232 km (144 mi) in 4 hours 17 minutes and 53 seconds at Mourmelon on 3 November 1909.

In April 1910, Paulhan won the London to Manchester air race flying a Farman III, competing against Claude Grahame-White, also flying a Farman.

The type was widely used as a training aircraft. By the beginning of 1911, the Aéro-Club de France had issued 354 pilots licences, of which 81 had been gained flying a Farman III; a total only exceeded by the 83 pilots who had qualified flying a Blériot monoplane.

In Belgium on 15 July 1910, a Farman III carried the first head of state in aviation history, Ferdinand I of Bulgaria.

Seven examples were used by the Greek military during the Balkan Wars, being used for reconnaissance.

== Differences from Maurice Farman biplane ==
Henry Farman's brother, Maurice Farman, constructed his own biplane in 1909, which first flew in February that year. Both machines were derived from the Voisin 1907 biplane, all having similar configurations. Henry's aircraft differed from Maurice's in lacking the pilot's nacelle and not using a Renault inline engine. Maurice and Henry began to collaborate closely in 1912.

== Survivors and replicas ==
One original Farman III is known to have survived, on display in Tokorozawa Aviation Museum (Tokorozawa, Japan). This example made the first powered flight in Japan, piloted by Yoshitoshi Tokugawa on 19 December 1911. It flew until 1913, when a fatal accident grounded the aircraft. Captured by the United States during World War II, it was restored and returned to Japan in 1960.

An exact replica of a Greek Farman III "Daedalus" is displayed in Athens War Museum (Athens, Greece). A replica of the first German military aircraft, a Farman III, is displayed at Militärhistorisches Museum Flugplatz Berlin-Gatow (Berlin, Germany). A replica of a Farman III is also displayed at Museo nazionale della scienza e della tecnologia Leonardo da Vinci Milano (Milan, Italy).

A flyable replica with a slightly changed wing profile was built in 2011 by Stasys Čepaitis, near Panevėžys, Lithuania. The aircraft was registered as LY-BFJ. As of 2022, the Lithuanian aircraft register shows that the aircraft airworthiness expired in September 2019.

== Specifications (1909 standard type) ==
Data from

General characteristics

- Crew: 1
- Capacity: 1
- Length: 12 m (39 ft 4.5 in)
- Wingspan: 10 m (33 ft 9.75 in)
- Height: 3.5 m (11 ft 6 in)
- Wing area: 40 m^{2} (430.56 sq ft)
- Gross weight: 550 kg (1,213 lb)
- Powerplant: 1 × Gnome Omega 7-cylinder rotary engine , 37 kW (50 hp)

Performance

- Maximum speed: 60 km/h (37 mph, 32 kn)

== See also ==
Related development

- Voisin-Farman I

Aircraft of comparable role, configuration, and era

- Bristol Boxkite
- Howard Wright 1910 Biplane
- Short S.27
- Wright Model A
- Kaishiki No.1
