= Richard Farman =

British-French aeronautical engineer and aviator

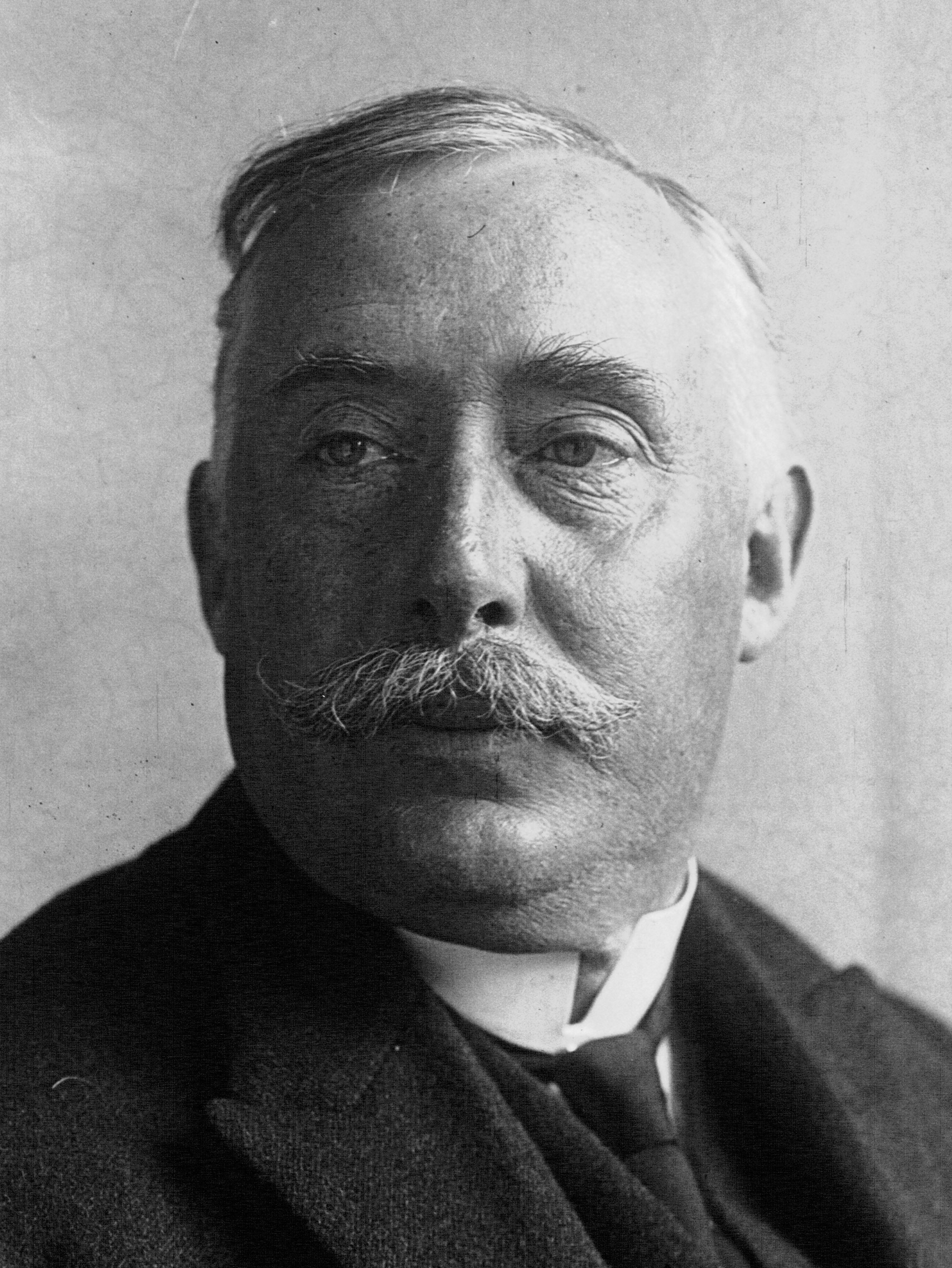
- Dick Farman in 1920
- Born: 1872; Paris, France
- Died: 31 January 1940 (aged 67–68)
- Citizenship: France; United Kingdom

Richard Farman (1872–1940) was a British-French aeronautical engineer, aviator, and eldest of the Farman brothers who were pioneers of early aviation. He was better known as Dick Farman using the then popular sobriquet in place of the formal Richard. Like his brothers he was also active among pioneer racing cyclists and motocyclists.

== Biography ==
Born in Paris, France to British parents, he was the eldest son (Note: It seems that also there was an elder sister who died very young.) of a well to do newspaper correspondent working there. With his brothers he was educated at home and they were allowed unusual freedom to follow personal interests. With his brother Henry, who was also trained as an engineer, he set up Paris's largest automobile agency, the Palais de l'Automobile, dealing in Delaunay-Bellevilles, Panhard-Levassors, and Renaults. Together they wrote The Aviator's Companion, published in 1910, describing their early flying achievements.

He became an electrical engineer, and built the first electric trams in Brazil, in Rio de Janeiro. He was an author of many technical works on engines, also an aviator in 1914 to 1918, and was a director of an aircraft factory in Lyon.

After World War I, he founded Avions H.M.D. Farman, (Note: H.M.D. seems to stands for the initials of the three brothers; Henri, Maurice, and Dick.) also known as Farman Aviation Works, with his two younger brothers Henri and Maurice, in Boulogne-Billancourt.

Dick concentrated on the business side of manufacture at Société Anonyme des Usines Farman and their airline, (Note: Lignes Aériennes Farman (from 1922 S.G.T.A. Société Générale de Transport Aérien commonly called Lignes Farman) which claimed to have flown the first international airline service Paris-Brussels on 22 March 1919) which became part of Air France in 1933. He is rarely mentioned in most Farman stories in later days. In spite of his scientific knowledge and techniques, he dealt with administrative and commercial services. At the age of 65 Dick retired, after the French nationalization of its aircraft industry in 1937 ended their independence, the brothers refusing to remain as employees. Dick Farman died in Paris 31 January 1940.
