= Yoshitoshi Tokugawa =

Japanese general (1884–1963)

Baron Yoshitoshi Tokugawa
- 徳川 好敏
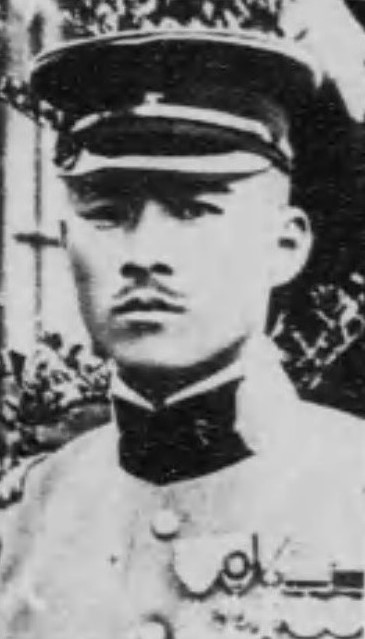
- Born: 24 July 1884; Tokyo, Japan
- Died: 17 April 1963 (aged 78); Tokyo, Japan
- Military career
- Allegiance: Empire of Japan
- Branch: Imperial Japanese Army
- Service years: 1903–1945
- Rank: Lieutenant General
- Commands: Tokorozawa Army Aviation School, Akeno Army Aviation School
- Awards: Order of the Rising Sun, 1st class

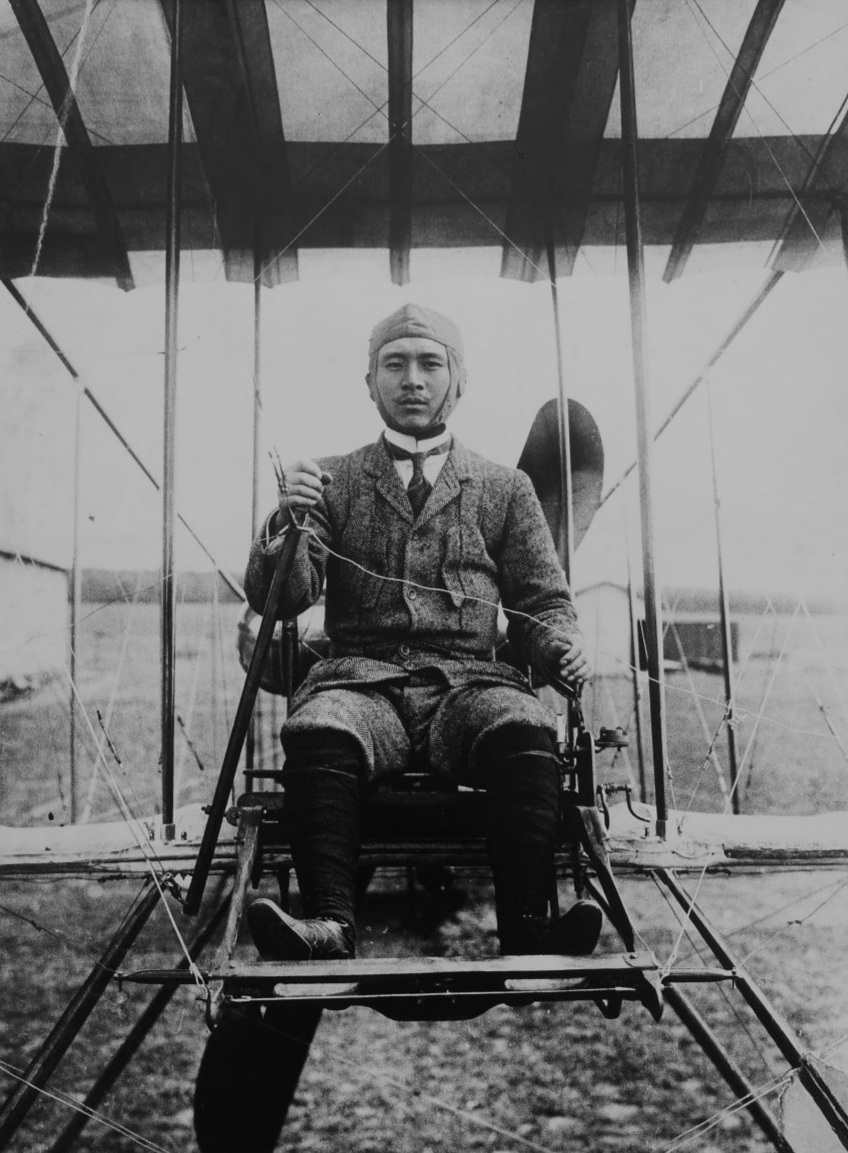
Lieutenant General Baron Tokugawa Yoshitoshi

Baron Yoshitoshi Tokugawa (徳川 好敏, Tokugawa Yoshitoshi; 24 July 1884 – 17 April 1963) was a lieutenant general in the Imperial Japanese Army and one of the pioneers of military aviation in Japan. The first Japanese to obtain his pilot's licence from the Aéro-Club de France, he is credited with having made the first flight in a powered aircraft in Japan in 1910.

== Biography ==
=== Family and early career ===
Tokugawa Yoshitoshi was born in Tokyo and was the son of Count Tokugawa Atsumori (1856–1924) (head of the Shimizu Tokugawa clan). Through his father, he was the grandnephew of the last Shōgun, Tokugawa Yoshinobu. Although his father had been created a count in the kazoku peerage in 1884, he had relinquished the title in 1899, so Yoshitoshi did not inherit his title.

Tokugawa graduated from the 15th class of the Imperial Japanese Army Academy in 1903, after having specialized in military engineering. In 1909, he was sent as a military attaché to France, specifically to study aeronautical engineering and military applications for the use of aircraft in combat. He became the first Japanese to obtain his pilot's licence from the Aéro-Club de France.

On orders of the Imperial Japanese Army General Staff, he purchased a Farman III biplane, which he shipped back to Japan. On 19 December 1910, Tokugawa flew Japan's first successful powered aircraft flight at Yoyogi Parade Ground where Tokyo's Yoyogi Park is now located, only seven years after the Wright Brothers' first flight in the United States. On 5 April 1911, Tokugawa piloted the inaugural flight at Japan's first permanent airfield in Tokorozawa. Shortly afterwards, he successfully took the first aerial photographs in Japan to prove the utility of the aircraft for reconnaissance. On 23 April 1911, he set a Japanese record with a Blériot Aéronautique, flying 48 miles in 1 hour 9 minutes 30 seconds. Also in 1911, several more aircraft were imported and an improved version of the Farman III biplane, the Kaishiki No.1, was built and flown by Tokugawa in Japan.

=== Later career ===
Tokugawa, together with fellow aviation pioneer Hino Kumazo promoted the new technology to the army. Despite budgetary cutbacks by Army Minister Ugaki Kazushige, the Imperial Japanese Army Air Service was established in 1912.

In 1914, with the outbreak of war, the Japanese laid siege to the German colony of Tsingtao, aircraft from the army together with seaplanes flown from the Japanese seaplane carrier Wakamiya conducted reconnaissance and bombing operations. The Provisional Air Corps consisting of four Maurice Farman MF.7 biplanes and a single Nieuport VI-M monoplane flew 86 sorties among them. In December 1915, an air battalion was created under the Army Transport Command, which became responsible for all air operations. However, serious interest in military aviation did not develop until after World War I. Japanese military observers in Western Europe were quick to spot the advantages of the new technology.

Tokugawa led the 2nd Air Battalion, was commander of the 1st Air Regiment, and after his promotion to lieutenant general was commander of the Imperial Japanese Army Aviation Corps three times through the 1920s and 1930s. In 1928, he was created a baron in the kazoku peerage.

He served as Director of the Training Department in the Tokorozawa Army Aviation School, as Commandant of the same school and the Akeno Army Aviation School. He was later attached to the Imperial Japanese Army General Staff. Tokugawa came to be known in Japan as "the Grandfather of Flight".

He entered the active reserve in 1939 and was awarded the Grand Cordon of the Order of the Rising Sun in 1940. He was recalled to command the Imperial Army Aviation School in March 1944, before finally retiring the following year.
