= Tokorozawa Aviation Museum =

Museum in Saitama Prefecture, Japan

- Tokorozawa Kōkū Hasshō Kinenkan
- Kōkūkōen Park and Tokorazawa Aviation Museum. Japan's first airfield can be seen in the grassy area lined with bushes with the museum behind.

- Location within Japan
- Location: Tokorozawa, Saitama
- Coordinates: 35°47′56″N 139°28′18″E
- Type: Aviation museum
- Website: tam-web.jsf.or.jp

The Tokorozawa Aviation Museum (所沢航空発祥記念館, Tokorozawa Kōkū Hasshō Kinenkan) is a museum located in the city of Tokorozawa, Saitama, dedicated to the history of aviation in Japan. It contains aircraft and other displays (many of which are interactive) and an IMAX theatre. Located on the site of Japan's first airfield which started operations in 1911 with a flight by Yoshitoshi Tokugawa, the original single runway is still visible and has been incorporated into a larger multifunction park adjacent to the museum. It is located in the Tokorozawa Aviation Memorial Park.

== Aircraft in collection ==
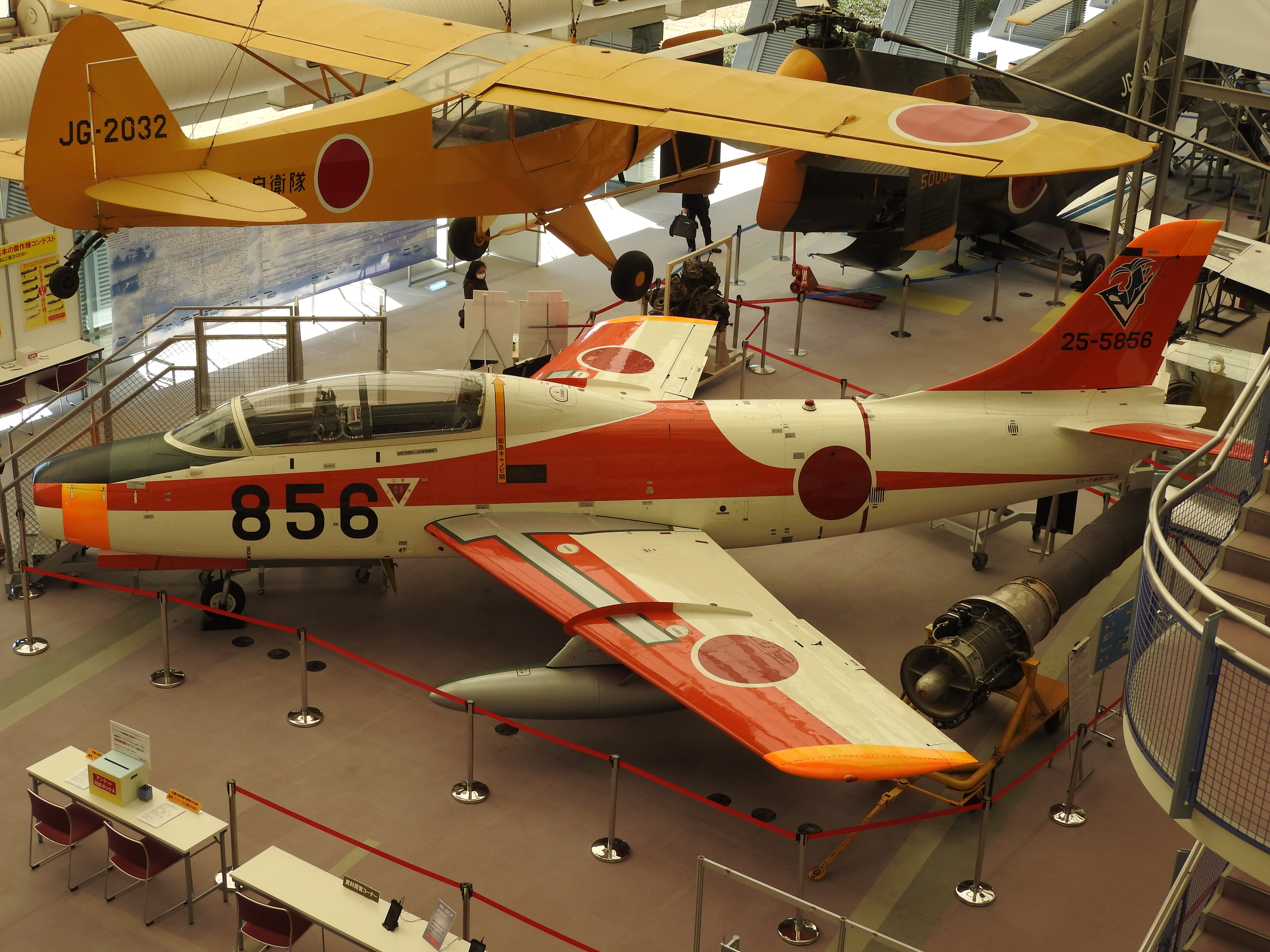
Fuji T-1 (25-5856)

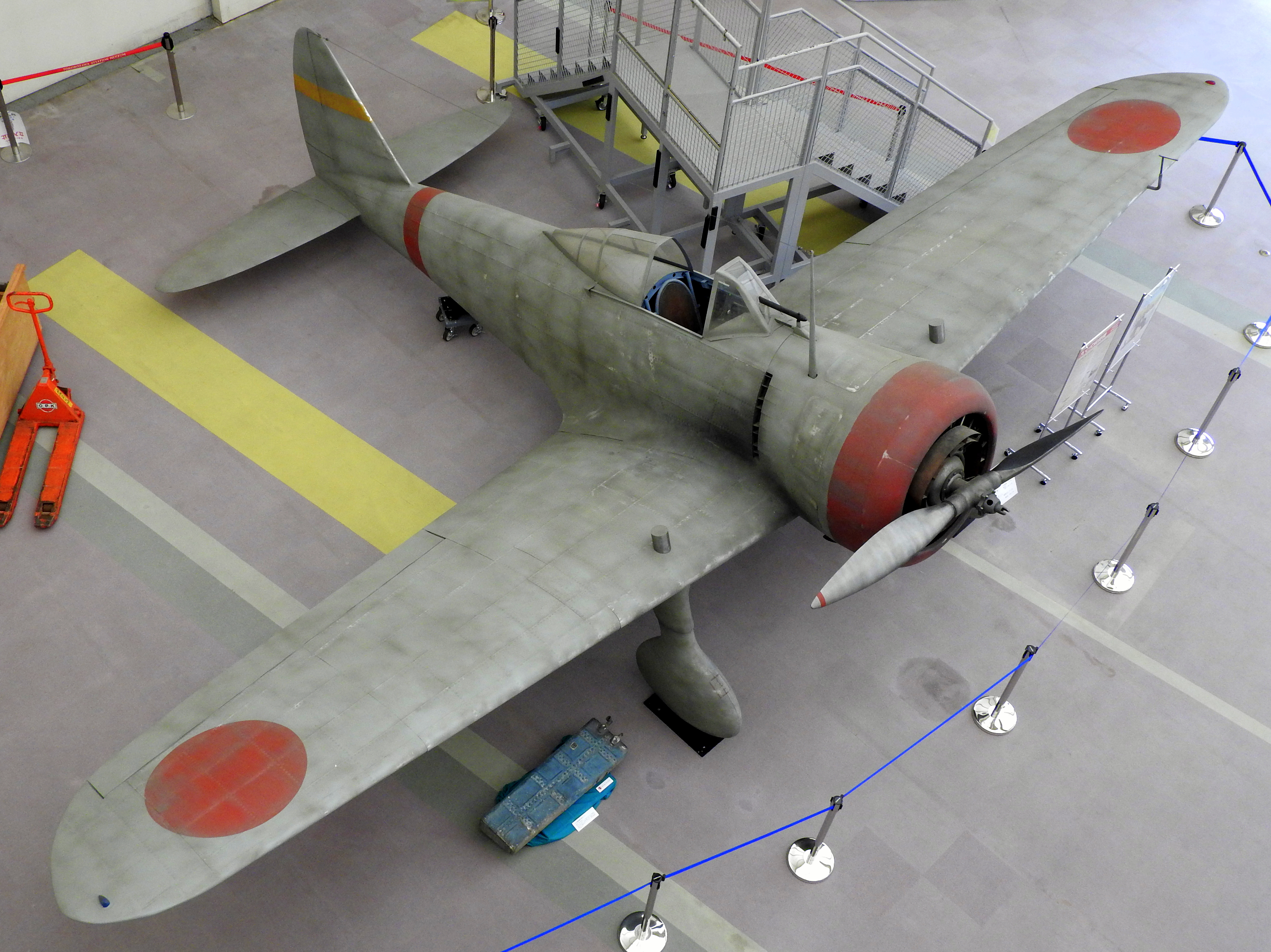
Nakajima Ki-27 Nate replica

At any given time the aircraft on display will vary. The NAMC YS-11 and the Curtiss EC-46 Commando are on permanent display in the park, but the collection visible in the museum itself changes. The collection is as follows:

- 91-1143 Curtiss EC-46A Commando (outside)
- JA8732 NAMC YS-11 (outside)
- 52-0099 North American T-6G Texan
- JG-0001 Sikorsky H-19C Chickasaw
- 50002/JG-0002 Piasecki H-21/Vertol V44A
- 25-5856 Fuji T-1
- 53-5025 Stinson L-5 Sentinel
- 31065/JG-1065 Hughes-Kawasaki OH-6J Cayuse
- 60508/JG-0508 Beechcraft T-34 Mentor
- JG-2032 Piper L-21B Super Cub
- 40001/JG-0001 Kawasaki KAL-2
- 41547/JG-1547 Bell UH-1B Iroquois
- 41560 Bell UH-1B Iroquois
- Nakajima Army Type 91 fighter (fuselage)
- Kaishiki No.1 (replica)
- Farman III
- 30003 Bell H-13E Sioux
- JA3052 Cessna 170B
- JA5170 Cessna T310P
- 4253/18 Fokker D.VIII (replica)
- 61328 Hughes TH-55J
- 30213 Kawasaki-Bell H-13KH
- 51734 Kawasaki-Vertol KV-107-II-4
- JA0148 Kirigamine Hato K-14 glider
- JA9549 Mil Mi-8PA Hip
- J-TECH Nieuport 81 E.2
- 84-8102 North American F-86D Sabre
- JA3925 Piper J-3C-65 Cub
- S4523 SPAD S.XII (replica)

== Temporary displays ==
In 2013, an airworthy Zero fighter from World War II was exhibited at the museum, on loan from the Planes of Fame Air Museum in California.

In 2016 a replica Nakajima Ki-27 Nate made for the 2015 Asahi TV drama "Tsuma to Tonda Tokkouhei" was displayed at the museum.

== Access ==
The museum is located near Kōkū-kōen Station on the Seibu Shinjuku Line, approximately 30 to 45 minutes from central Tokyo.

== See also ==
- List of aerospace museums
