= Maurice Farman =

British-French motor racing champion, aviator and aircraft manufacturer and designer

Maurice Alain Farman
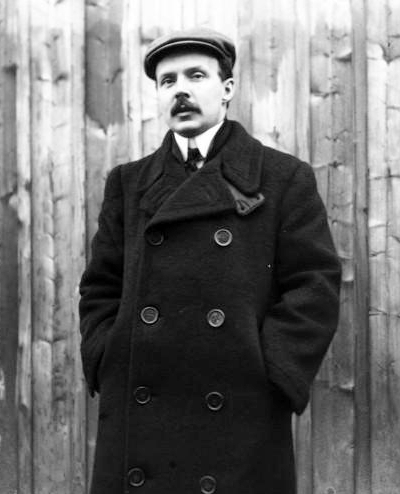
- Farman in 1909
- Born: 21 March 1877; Paris, France
- Died: 25 February 1964 (aged 86); Paris, France
- Citizenship: France; United Kingdom
- Relatives: Richard and Henri Farman

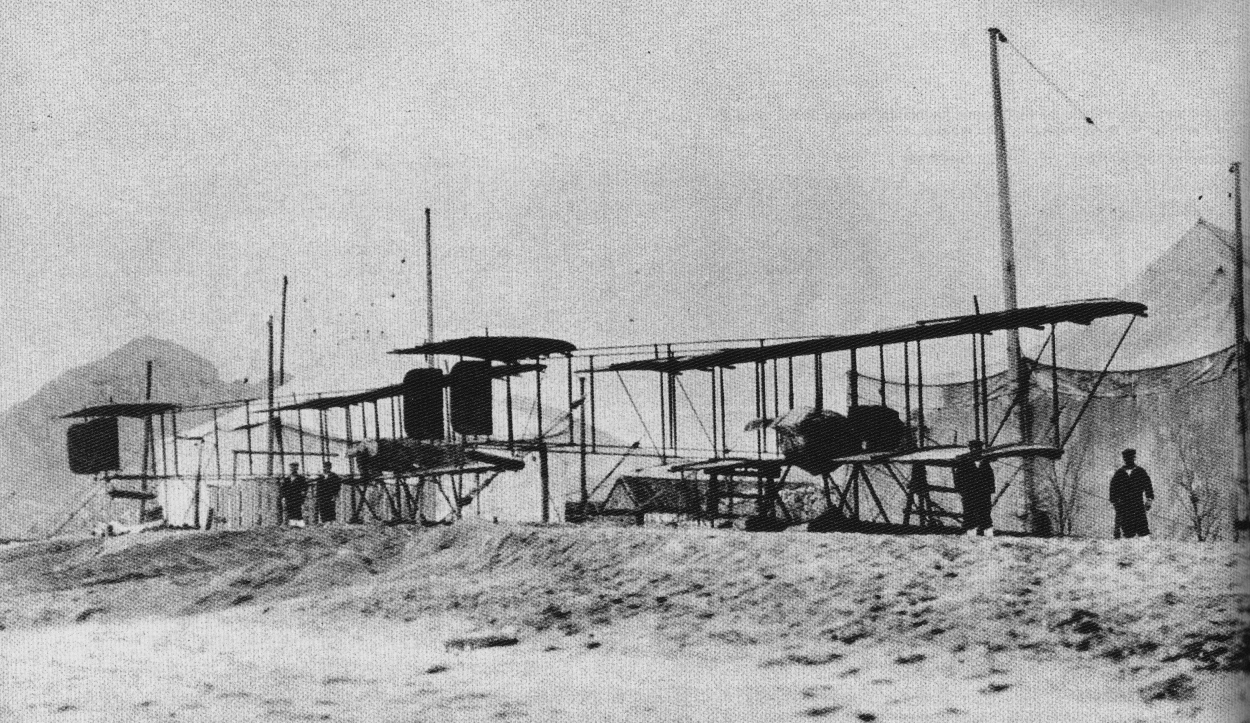
Two Maurice Farman seaplanes from the Imperial Japanese Navy seaplane carrier Wakamiya stationed on land in Qingdao in 1914.

Maurice Alain Farman (21 March 1877 – 25 February 1964) was a British-French Grand Prix motor racing champion, an aviator, and an aircraft manufacturer and designer.

== Biography ==
Born in Paris to English parents, he and his brothers Richard and Henry Farman were important pioneers of aviation in Europe.

A champion tandem cyclist with his brother Henry, Maurice Farman began racing Panhard automobiles and won the 1901 Pau Grand Prix, the first race ever to be called a Grand Prix. In May 1902 he won the "Circuit du Nord" race from Paris to Arras and back. He also competed in that year's Paris to Vienna race won by Marcel Renault. However, Farman's interest quickly turned to powered flight and in 1908 he bought a Voisin Model 4 biplane. In 1909 he set world endurance and speed records. He soon began to manufacture airplanes and in 1912 merged his business with his brother's aircraft company to form the Farman Aviation Works. He was awarded Aviator's Certificate (Brevet) no. 6 by the Aero-Club de France, issued on November 18, 1909.

Maurice Farman died in Paris in 1964.
