= Henri Farman =

British-French racing driver, aviator and aircraft designer (1874–1958)

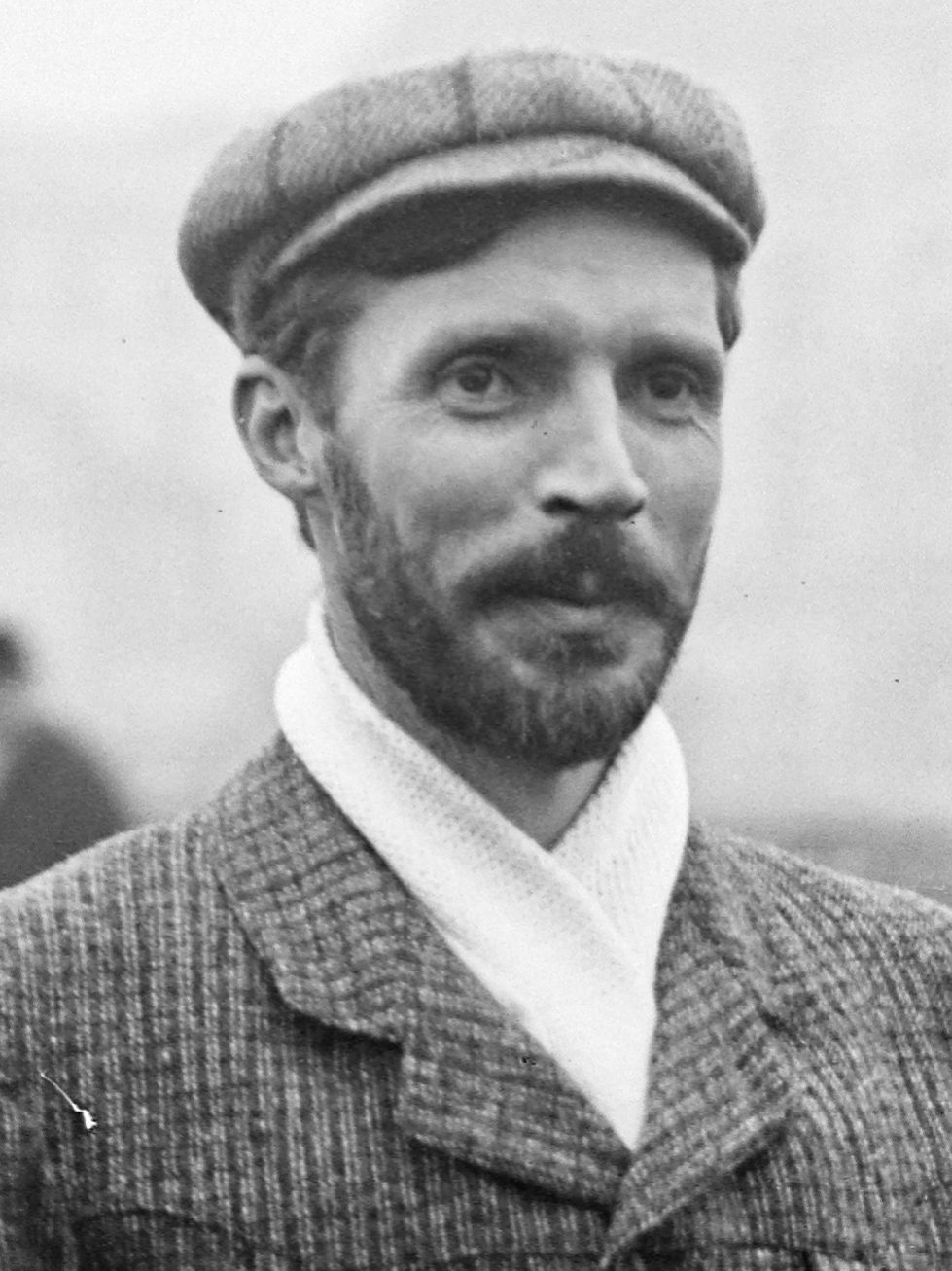
- Born: 26 May 1874; Paris, France
- Died: 17 July 1958 (aged 84); Paris, France
- Other name: Henry Farman
- Citizenship: France; United Kingdom
- Relatives: Maurice Farman, Richard Farman

Henri Farman (26 May 1874 – 17 July 1958) was a British-French aviator and aircraft designer and manufacturer with his brother Maurice Farman. Before dedicating himself to aviation he gained fame as a sportsman, specifically in cycling and motor racing. Henri acquired French nationality in 1937.

== Family and early life ==
Henri Farman was born in Paris, France, and was baptised as Harry Edgar Mudford Farman. He was a son of Thomas Frederick Farman, the Paris correspondent of the London Standard. His father was born in 1845 at Layer Marney, Essex, England. His mother, Sophia Ann Louisa Mudford, was born in Canterbury, Kent, on 9 September 1841. She was baptised on 16 July 1844 at St Pancras Old Church in London, and was a daughter of the author William Mudford, who by the time of Sophia's baptism was living at Harrington Square. Sophia and Thomas were married at St George's Hanover Square Church London, on 31 August 1868.

Henri trained as a painter at the École des Beaux Arts, but soon became interested in the new mechanical inventions that were appearing at the end of the 19th century. He was able to pursue this interest as an amateur sportsman.

== Cycling ==
Farman took part in cycle races from the age of fourteen, and started winning some races. Brother Maurice Farman also began cycle racing at the same age and started winning prizes. Henri became a championship cyclist, and won the Paris - Clermont-Ferrand race on 6 June 1892. On 6 October 1892 he won the French Championship, at the Vélodrome Buffalo in Paris, over a distance of 100 kilometres.

On 25 June 1893, Henri went by bicycle from Paris to Madrid with the journalist, author, and French cyclist Edouard de Perrodil. Edouard had written an account of this journey, and a book was published by MM. C. Marpon and Flammarion, titled Vélo ! Toro! Paris-Madrid bicyclette en 1893, which included drawings by Farman. They were received by the French Ambassador, among others upon reaching Madrid.

He then took part in tandem races with his brother Maurice Farman, forming a successful partnership. On 31 January 1895, at the Vélodrome d'Hiver, the Farman brothers broke the tandem bicycle record, covering 44.906 kilometres in an hour. They announced their retirement from cycling in November 1896.

== Motor racing ==
At around the same time as his brother Maurice, Henri discovered motor racing. On 17 February 1901, he won the light car class (400 – 650 kg) Grand Prix du Palais d'Hiver, of the Circuit du sud-ouest. Maurice Farman won the heavy car class of the race. On 29 May 1901, Henri took part in the Paris-Bordeaux race and finished in seventh place. This was an open-entry race held concurrently with the 1901 Gordon Bennett Cup, and over the same course. Fifth place was taken in the 1901 Paris to Berlin Race. Henri won the heavy class section of the 1902 Paris - Vienna race. Marcel Renault came first in the general classification of this race. He took third place in the 1903 Gordon Bennett Cup.

He had an accident during the elimination trials for the 1905 Gordon Bennett Cup, on 16 June, over the hilly Auvergne circuit. While on the last round of this circuit, descending the Clermont Ferrand hill, on one of the turns in that descent, his car skidded. Henri and his chauffeur were thrown from the car, and ended up on top of a tree. Many onlookers believed he had been killed. But Henri was unharmed, came down from the tree and smoked a cigarette. He believed his car had ended up at the bottom of a ravine after this accident, but was not certain about the final destination of it.

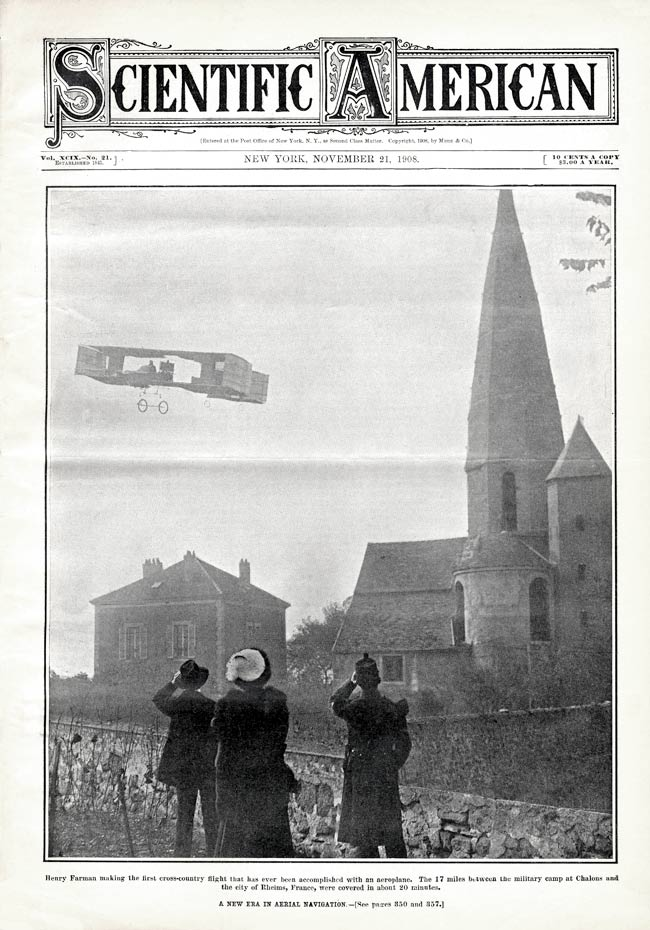
Farman making the first cross-country flight accomplished with an aeroplane

== Aviation ==
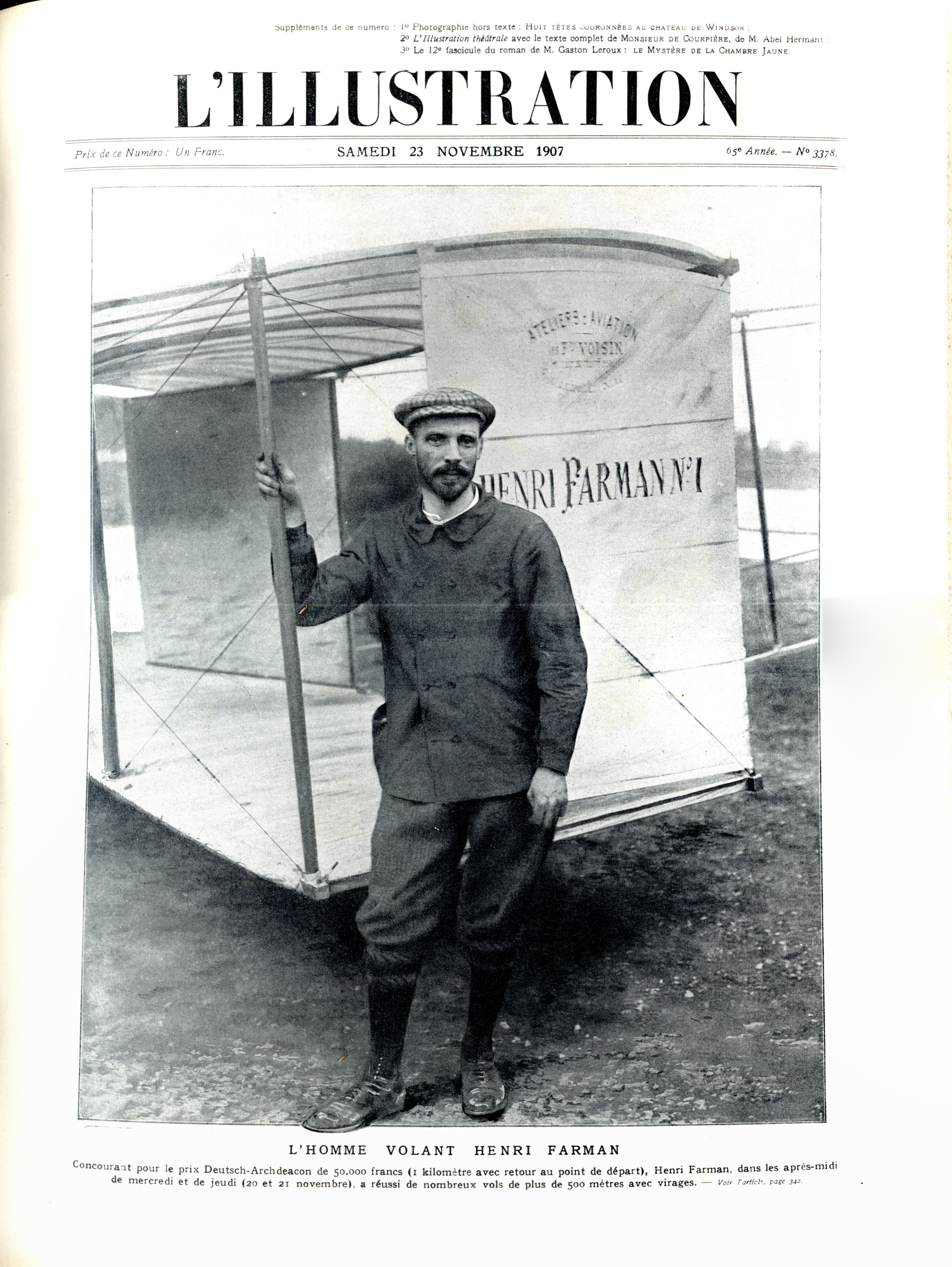
Cover of L'Illustration (23 Nov 1907) showing Henri Farman with his Voisin-Farman I while competing for the Grand Prix d'Aviation.

Farman started practicing in 1907 with a homemade biplane glider on the sandhills of Le Touquet, after first experimenting with model aeroplanes of different sizes. He then decided he wanted a powered plane, and ordered a Voisin 1907 biplane on 1 June 1907. He used this aircraft to set many official records for both distance and duration.

On 26 October 1907, at Issy-les-Moulineaux, France, he made flights, among others, of 363, 403, and 771 metres in the plane. He also started to turn the plane in the air on this date. The distance of 771 metres was completed in 52 seconds. It was the longest flight in the world that year, and won Farman the Ernest Archdeacon Cup. He made a complete circular flight of 1,030 metres, in 1 minute 14 seconds on 10 November 1907 at Issy. This was the first time that a European aeroplane had completed a full circle. And the first time that an aeroplane, other than a Wright brothers one, had stayed in the air for longer than a minute.

The Voisin-Farman I was also the first biplane in Europe to fly a circular circuit of 1 kilometre, over a predetermined course, on 13 January 1908. This again occurred at Issy-les-Moulineaux, France, and won Farman the 50,000 franc Grand Prix d'Aviation offered by Henri Deutsch de la Meurthe. And on 21 March 1908, at the same place, he made a flight of 2 kilometres. In the evening of the same day, Léon Delagrange took Farman back to the hangar, making Farman the first fixed-wing aircraft "passenger". At the end of May Farman had also made the first flights in Europe with a passenger, carrying Ernest Archdeacon for 1,242 metres (4,075 ft) at Ghent.

On 30 October 1908, Farman went on to make the first cross-country flight in Europe. Farman flew from his hangars at Camp de Châlons, Bouy, to Reims, landing at the cavalry ground. It was a distance of 27 kilometres.

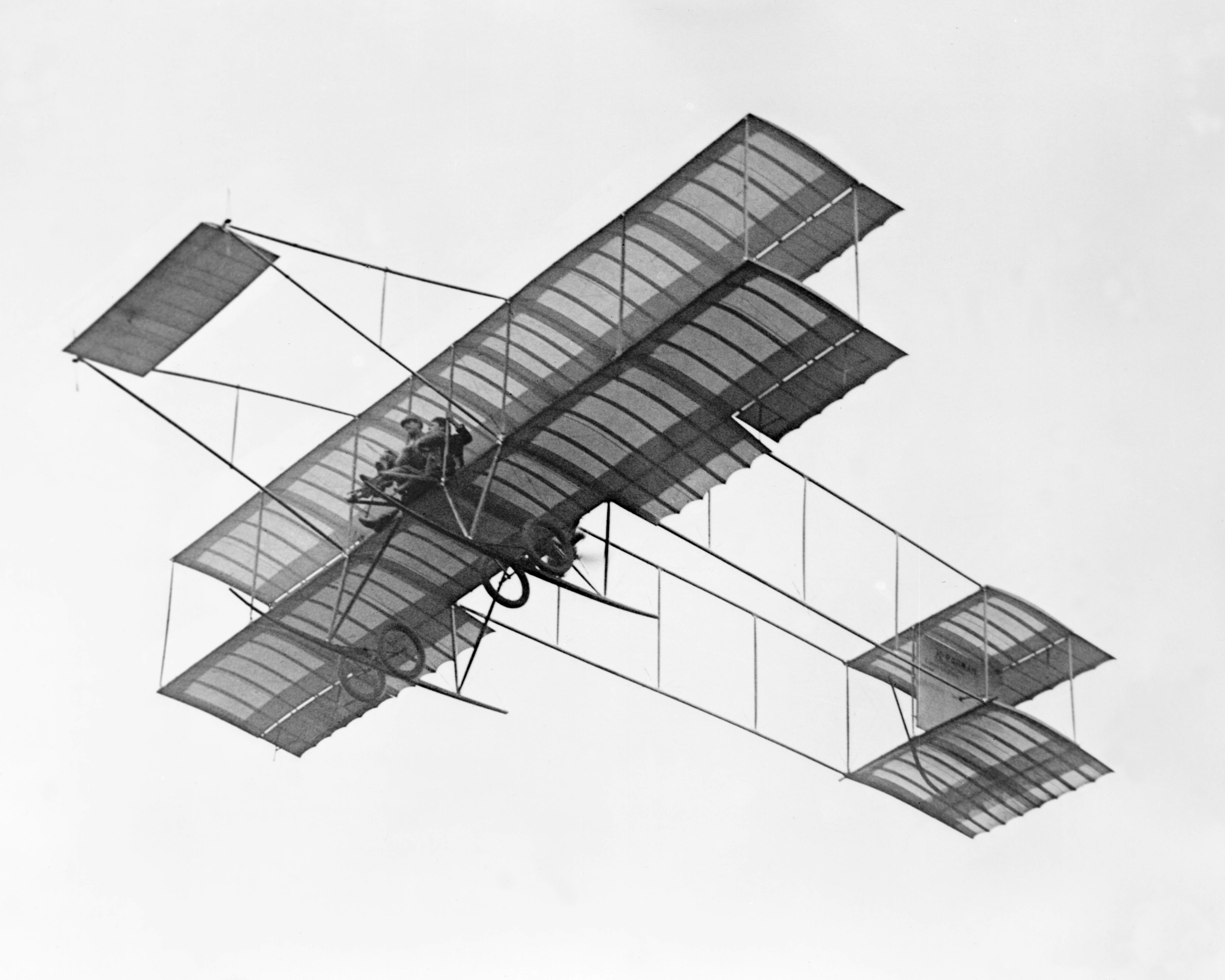
Farman III at the Dominguez Field, Los Angeles 1910

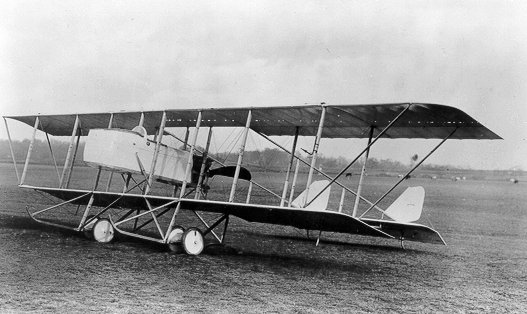
MF.11 "Shorthorn"

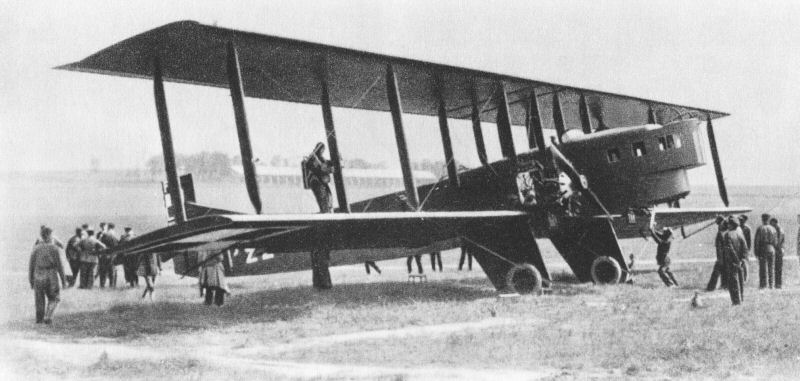
The passenger transport Goliath

By early 1909, Farman fell out with Gabriel Voisin because Voisin had sold an aircraft that had been built to Farman's specifications to J.T.C. Moore-Brabazon. This aircraft was named the Bird of Passage by Brabazon. Farman then started manufacturing aircraft to his own design. The first of these, the Farman III, first flew in April 1909. It was an immediate success and widely imitated.

In 1909, he opened a flying school at Châlons-sur-Marne at which George Bertram Cockburn was the first pupil. In this same year he made further record breaking flights. One of 180 kilometres in just over 3 hours, at Reims on 27 August. And one of 232 kilometres in 4 hours 17 minutes and 53 seconds, at Mourmelon-le-Grand on 3 November. In October 1909 he appeared at the Blackpool Aviation Week, Britain's first air show, at which he won over £2000 in prizes.

In partnership with his two brothers Maurice and Richard (Dick), he built a highly successful and innovative aircraft manufacturing plant. Their 1914 model was used extensively for artillery observation and reconnaissance during World War I. The Farman Aircraft company's Goliath was the first long-distance passenger airliner, beginning regular Paris-London (Croydon Airport) flights on 8 February 1919.

He was made a chevalier of the French Légion d'honneur in 1919. Along with Maurice, he retired in 1937 when the French Popular Front government nationalised the aircraft industry; Farman's company becoming part of the Societe Nationale de Constructions Aeronautiques du Centre.

Farman took French nationality in 1937. He died in Paris on 17 July 1958 and is buried in the Cimetière de Passy in Paris.

In 1988, Farman was inducted into the International Air & Space Hall of Fame at the San Diego Air & Space Museum.

== See also ==
- Farman Aviation Works
- Farman III (1909)
- Farman F.60 Goliath
- Farman F.121 Jabiru
- Farman F.170 Jabiru
- Farman F.222
- Farman F 402
- Léon Lemartin – Farman's support engineer for the Gnome Omega rotary engine.

== Sources ==
- Squier, George Owen (1908). "The Present Status of Military Aeronautics. II. Aviation. Representative Aeroplanes of Various Types. The Farman Aeroplane". Annual Report of the Board of Regents of the Smithsonian Institution: 134–135.
- "From All Quarters – Obituary of Henry Farman". Flight. 74 (2583): 96. 25 July 1958.
- Bradley, W F (1 August 1958). "Henry Farman – an Appreciation". Flight. 74 (2584): 158.
