= Araiyakushi-mae Station =

Railway station in Tokyo, Japan

SS05 Araiyakushi-mae Station 新井薬師前駅
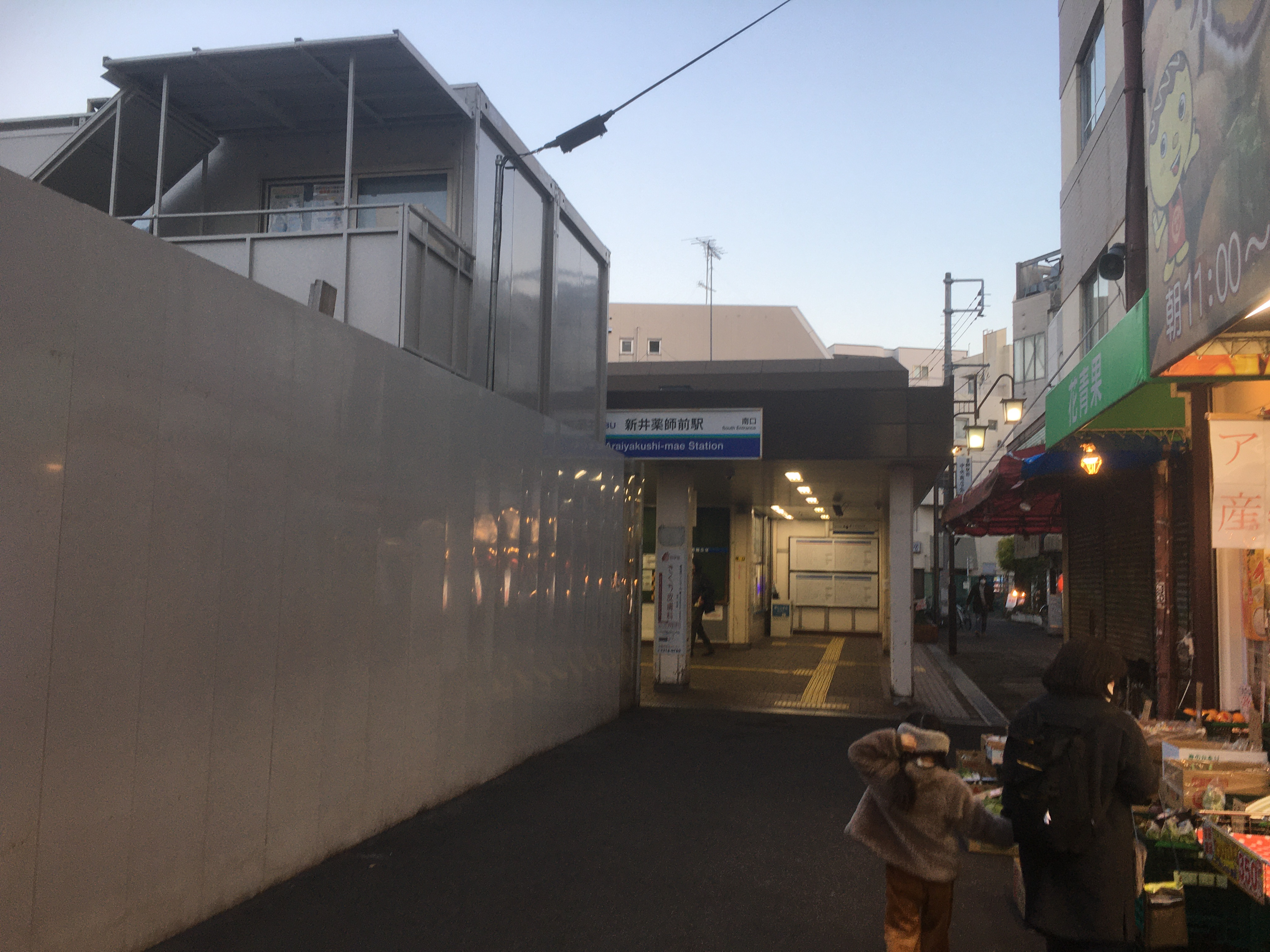
- South entrance, December 2021

General information
- Location: 5-43-20 Kamitakada, Nakano, Tokyo （東京都中野区上高田5-43-20） Japan
- Coordinates: 35°42′56.9″N 139°40′18.8″E
- Operator: Seibu Railway
- Line: Seibu Shinjuku Line
- Connections: Bus stop

Other information
- Station code: SS05

History
- Opened: 16 April 1927

Passengers
- FY2013: 22,645 daily

Services
Preceding station	Seibu Railway	Following station
Numabukuro SS06 towards Hon-Kawagoe	Shinjuku Line Local	Nakai SS04 towards Seibu-Shinjuku
Location

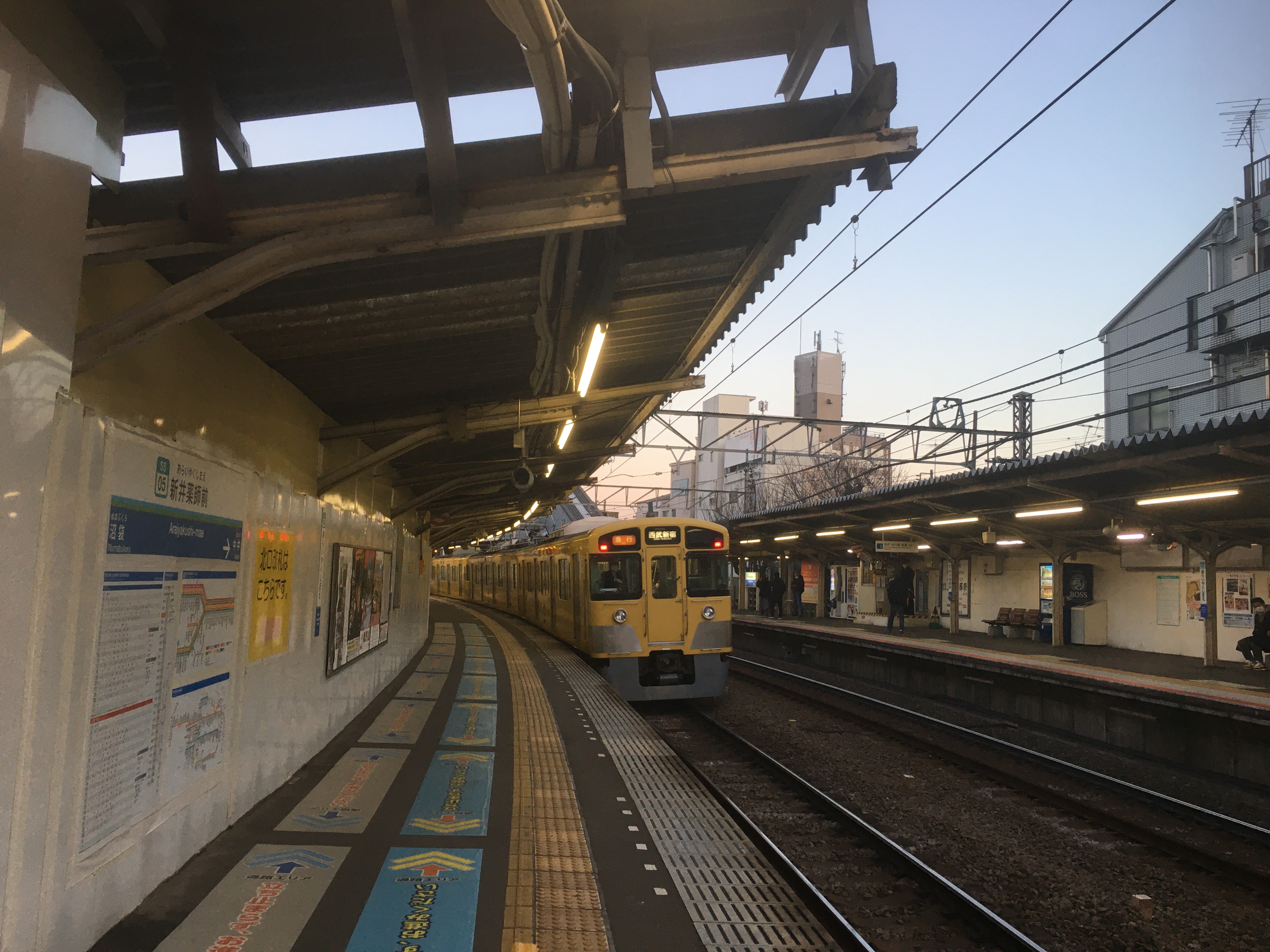
Platforms and a train in December, 2021

Araiyakushi-mae Station (新井薬師前駅, Araiyakushi-mae-eki) is a railway station on the Seibu Shinjuku Line in Nakano, Tokyo, Japan, operated by the private railway operator Seibu Railway.

== Lines ==
Araiyakushi-mae Station is served by the 47.5 km Seibu Shinjuku Line from Seibu-Shinjuku in Tokyo to Hon-Kawagoe in Saitama Prefecture. Located between Nakai and Numabukuro, it is 5.2 km from the Seibu-Shinjuku terminus.

During the daytime off-peak, the station is served by six trains per hour in either direction.

== Station layout ==
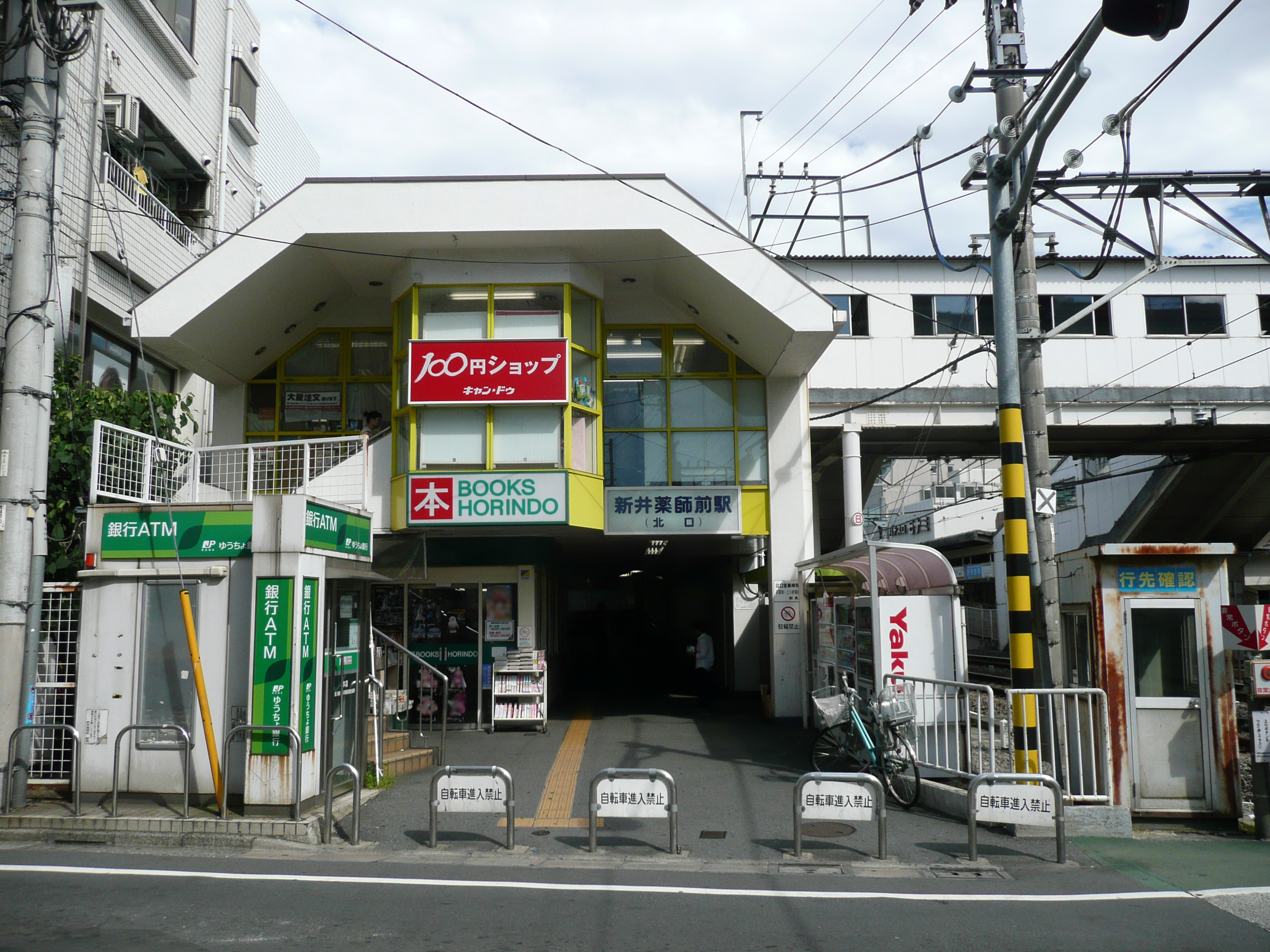
North entrance, July 2012

The station consists of a two ground-level side platforms serving two tracks.

=== Platforms ===
1	Seibu Shinjuku Line	for Tanashi, Tokorozawa, Haijima, and Hon-Kawagoe
2	Seibu Shinjuku Line	for Takadanobaba and Seibu-Shinjuku

== History ==
The station opened on 16 April 1927.

Station numbering was introduced on all Seibu Railway lines during fiscal 2012, with Araiyakushi-mae Station becoming "SS05".

== Future developments ==
In order to ease congestion and improve the safety of the railway in the local area, plans have been produced to divert the tracks between Nakai Station and Nogata Station underground. Consequently, the existing station complex is expected to be replaced by an underground station. Approval for the plan was granted in April 2013.

== Passenger statistics ==
In fiscal 2013, the station was the 48th busiest on the Seibu network with an average of 22,645 passengers daily.

The passenger figures for previous years are as shown below.

Fiscal year	Daily average
2000	26,580
2009	23,648
2010	22,846
2011	22,599
2012	22,773
2012	22,645

== Surrounding area ==
- Baishoin Temple, commonly known as Araiyakushi, after which the station was named
- Mejiro University Shinjuku campus
