= Numabukuro Station =

Railway station in Tokyo, Japan

Coordinates: 35.7195°N 139.6637°E

SS06 Numabukuro Station 沼袋駅
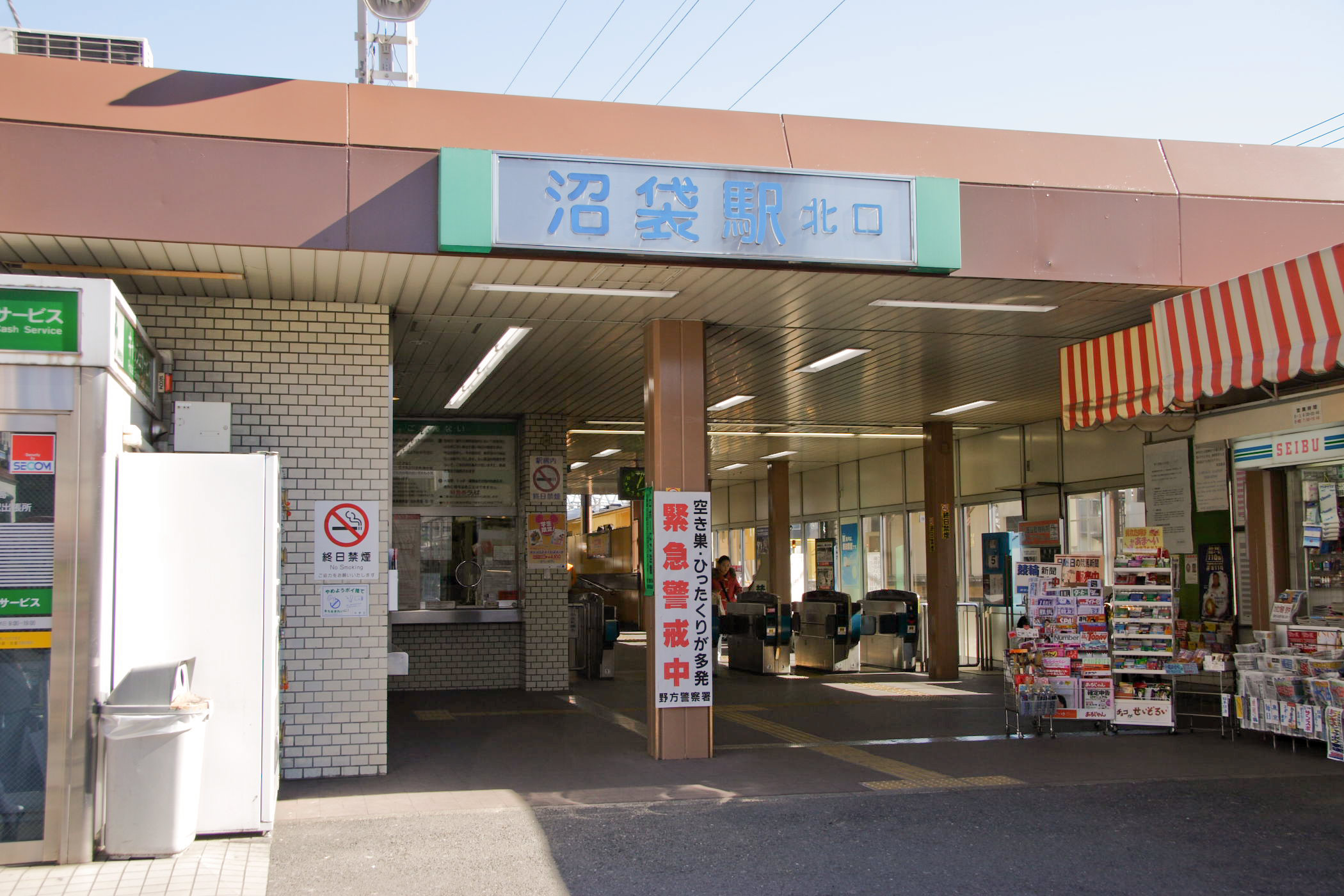
- North entrance, February 2006

General information
- Location: Nakano, Tokyo; Japan
- Operator: Seibu Railway
- Line: Seibu Shinjuku Line
- Connections: Bus stop

Other information
- Station code: SS06

History
- Opened: 16 April 1927

Passengers
- FY2013: 19,720 daily

Services
Preceding station	Seibu Railway	Following station
Nogata SS07 towards Hon-Kawagoe	Shinjuku Line Local	Araiyakushi-mae SS05 towards Seibu-Shinjuku
Location

Numabukuro Station (沼袋駅, Numabukuro-eki) is a railway station on the Seibu Shinjuku Line in Nakano, Tokyo, Japan, operated by the private railway operator Seibu Railway.

== Lines ==
Numabukuro Station is served by the 47.5 km Seibu Shinjuku Line from Seibu-Shinjuku in Tokyo to Hon-Kawagoe in Saitama Prefecture. Located between Araiyakushi-mae and Nogata, it is 6.1 km from the Seibu-Shinjuku terminus.

During the daytime off-peak, the station is served by six trains per hour in either direction.

== Station layout ==
The station consists of a two ground-level side platforms serving two tracks, with centre tracks in between for non-stop trains.

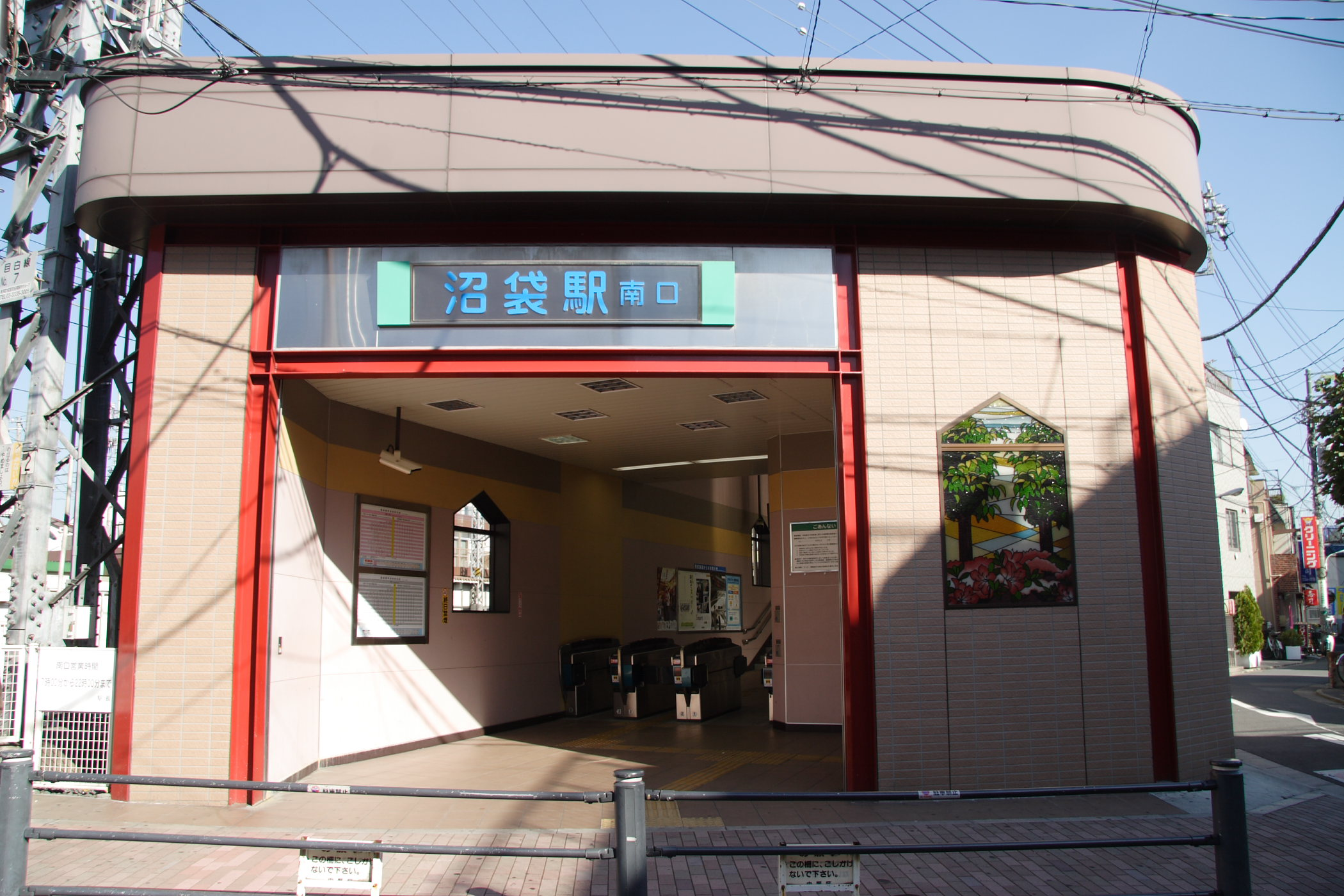
South entrance, November 2006

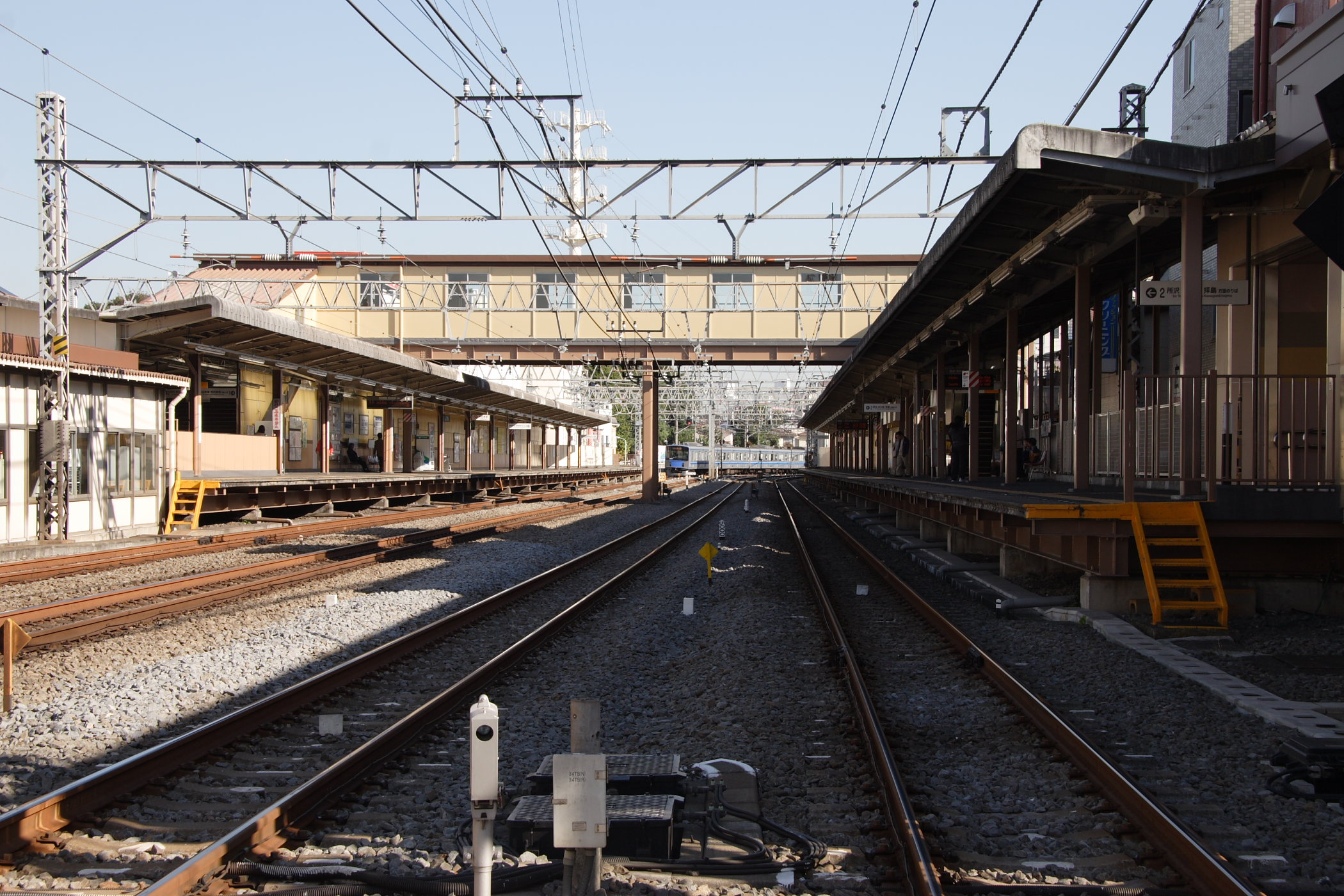
General view of the station, November 2006

=== Platforms ===
1	Seibu Shinjuku Line	for Takadanobaba and Seibu-Shinjuku
2	Seibu Shinjuku Line	for Tanashi, Tokorozawa, Haijima, and Hon-Kawagoe

== History ==
The station opened on 16 April 1927.

Station numbering was introduced on all Seibu Railway lines during fiscal 2012, with Numabukuro Station becoming "SS06".

== Future developments ==
In order to ease congestion and improve the safety of the railway in the local area, plans have been produced to divert the tracks between Nakai Station and Nogata Station underground. Consequently, the existing station complex is expected to be replaced by an underground station. Approval for the plan was granted in April 2013.

== Passenger statistics ==
In fiscal 2013, the station was the 53rd busiest on the Seibu network with an average of 19,720 passengers daily.

The passenger figures for previous years are as shown below.

Fiscal year	Daily average
2000	20,768
2009	20,027
2010	19,465
2011	19,068
2012	19,632
2013	19,720

== Surrounding area ==
- Kokusai Junior College
