= Toritsu-Kasei Station =

Railway station in Tokyo, Japan

Coordinates: 35.7223°N 139.645°E

SS08 Toritsu-Kasei Station 都立家政駅
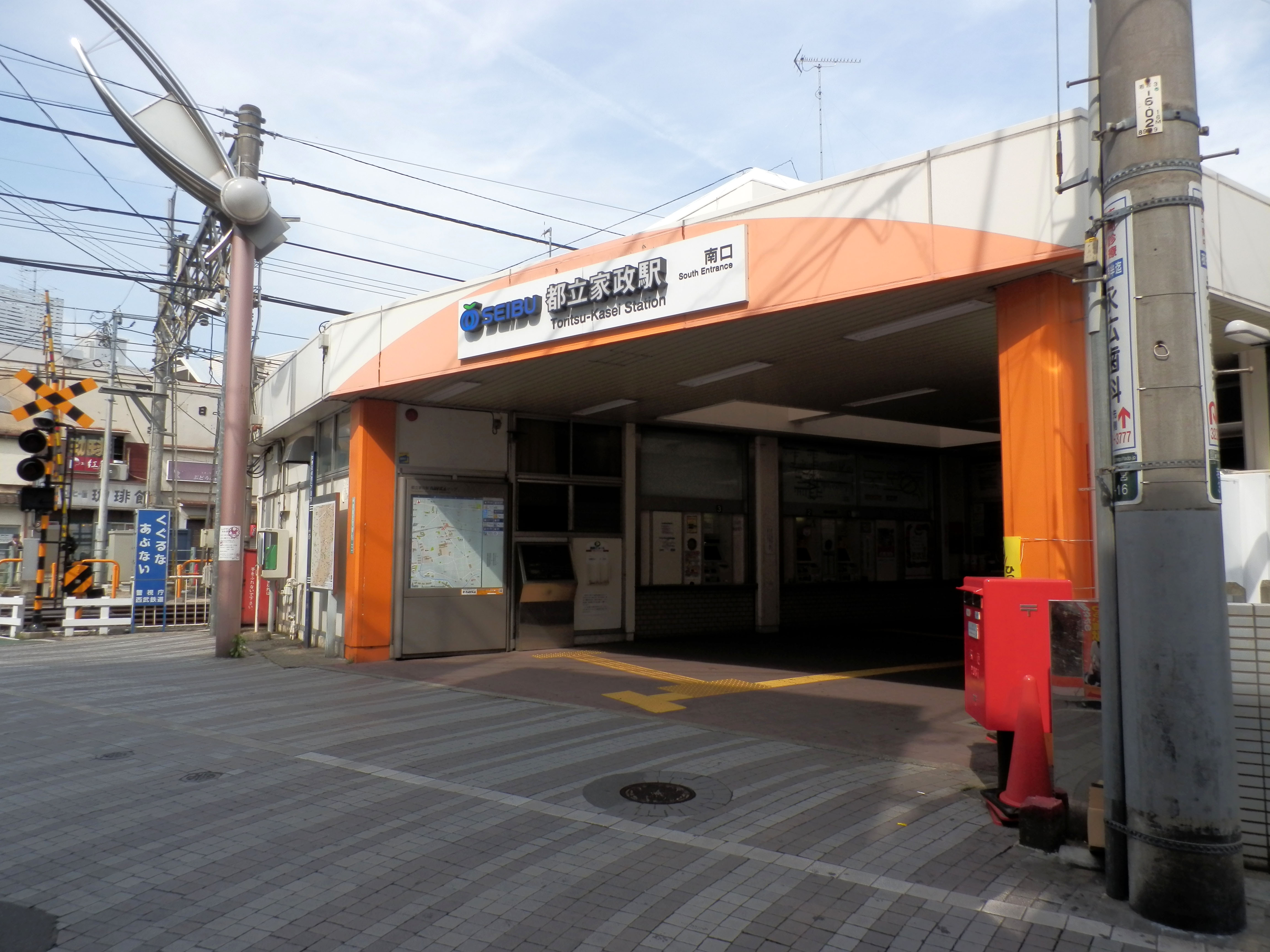
- South entrance, April 2013

General information
- Location: Nakano, Tokyo, Tokyo; Japan
- Operator: Seibu Railway
- Line: Seibu Shinjuku Line

Other information
- Station code: SS08

History
- Opened: 25 December 1937

Passengers
- FY2013: 17,556 daily

Services
Preceding station	Seibu Railway	Following station
Saginomiya SS09 towards Hon-Kawagoe	Shinjuku Line Local	Nogata SS07 towards Seibu-Shinjuku
Location

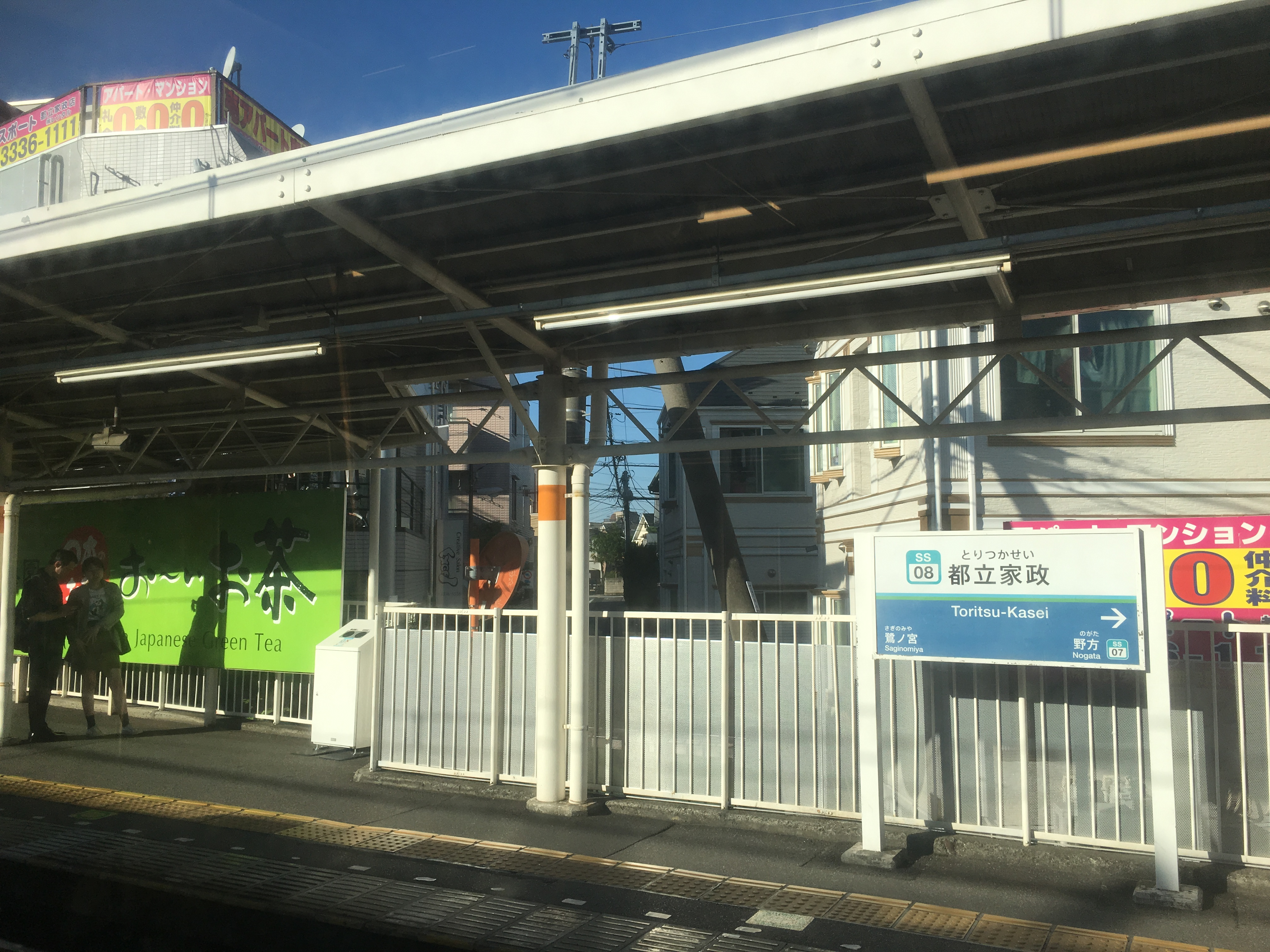
Platform, 2019

Toritsu-Kasei Station (都立家政駅, Toritsu-Kasei-eki) is a railway station on the Seibu Shinjuku Line in Nakano, Tokyo, Japan, operated by the private railway operator Seibu Railway.

== Lines ==
Toritsu-Kasei Station is served by the 47.5 km Seibu Shinjuku Line from Seibu-Shinjuku in Tokyo to Hon-Kawagoe in Saitama Prefecture.

== Station layout ==
The station consists of two ground-level side platforms serving two tracks.

=== Platforms ===
1	Seibu Shinjuku Line	for Tanashi, Tokorozawa, Haijima, and Hon-Kawagoe
2	Seibu Shinjuku Line	for Takadanobaba and Seibu-Shinjuku

== History ==
Toritsu-Kasei Station opened on 25 December 1937. Station numbering was introduced on all Seibu Railway lines during fiscal 2012, with Toritsu-Kasei Station becoming "SS08".

== Passenger statistics ==
In fiscal 2013, the station was the 56th busiest on the Seibu network with an average of 17,556 passengers daily.

The passenger figures for previous years are as shown below.

Fiscal year	Daily average
2009	17,615
2010	17,261
2011	17,040
2012	17,263
2013	17,556
