= Kami-Shakujii Station =

Railway station in Tokyo, Japan

Coordinates: 35.7264°N 139.5921°E

SS13 Kami-Shakujii Station 上石神井駅
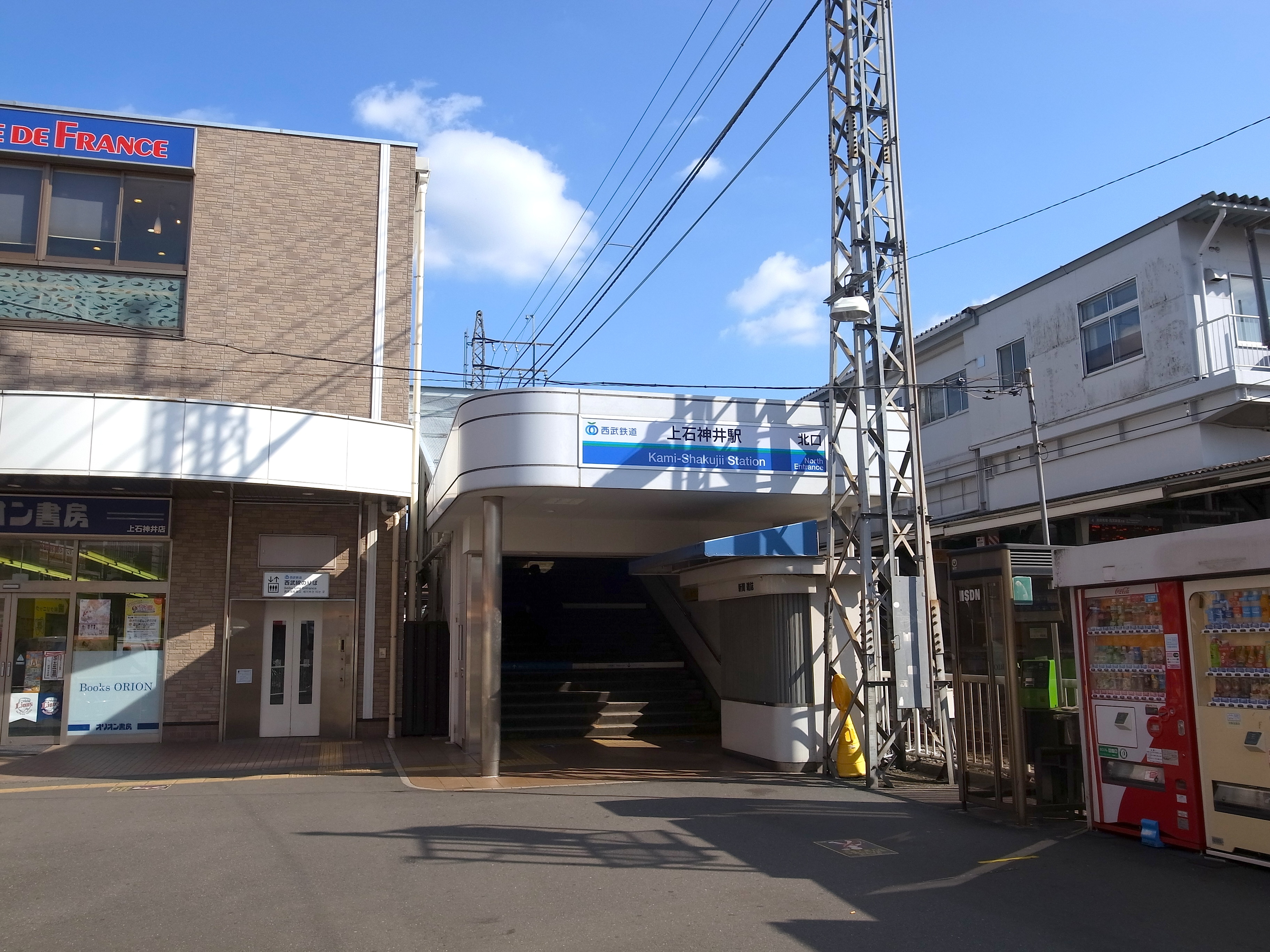
- Station building, October 2014

General information
- Location: Nerima, Tokyo; Japan
- Operator: Seibu Railway
- Line: Seibu Shinjuku Line

Other information
- Station code: SS13

History
- Opened: 16 April 1927

Passengers
- FY2013: 43,643 daily

Services
Preceding station	Seibu Railway	Following station
Tanashi One-way operation	Shinjuku Line Commuter Express	Saginomiya SS09 towards Seibu-Shinjuku
Tanashi SS17 towards Hon-Kawagoe	Shinjuku Line Express	Saginomiya SS09 towards Seibu-Shinjuku
Musashi-Seki SS14 towards Hon-Kawagoe	Shinjuku Line Semi Express	Saginomiya SS09 towards Seibu-Shinjuku
Musashi-Seki SS14 towards Hon-Kawagoe	Shinjuku Line Local	Kami-Igusa SS12 towards Seibu-Shinjuku
Location

Kami-Shakujii Station (上石神井駅, Kami-Shakujii-eki) is a railway station on the Seibu Shinjuku Line in Nerima, Tokyo, Japan, operated by the private railway operator Seibu Railway.

== Lines ==
Kami-Shakujii Station is served by the 47.5 km Seibu Shinjuku Line from Seibu-Shinjuku in Tokyo to Hon-Kawagoe in Saitama Prefecture.

== Station layout ==
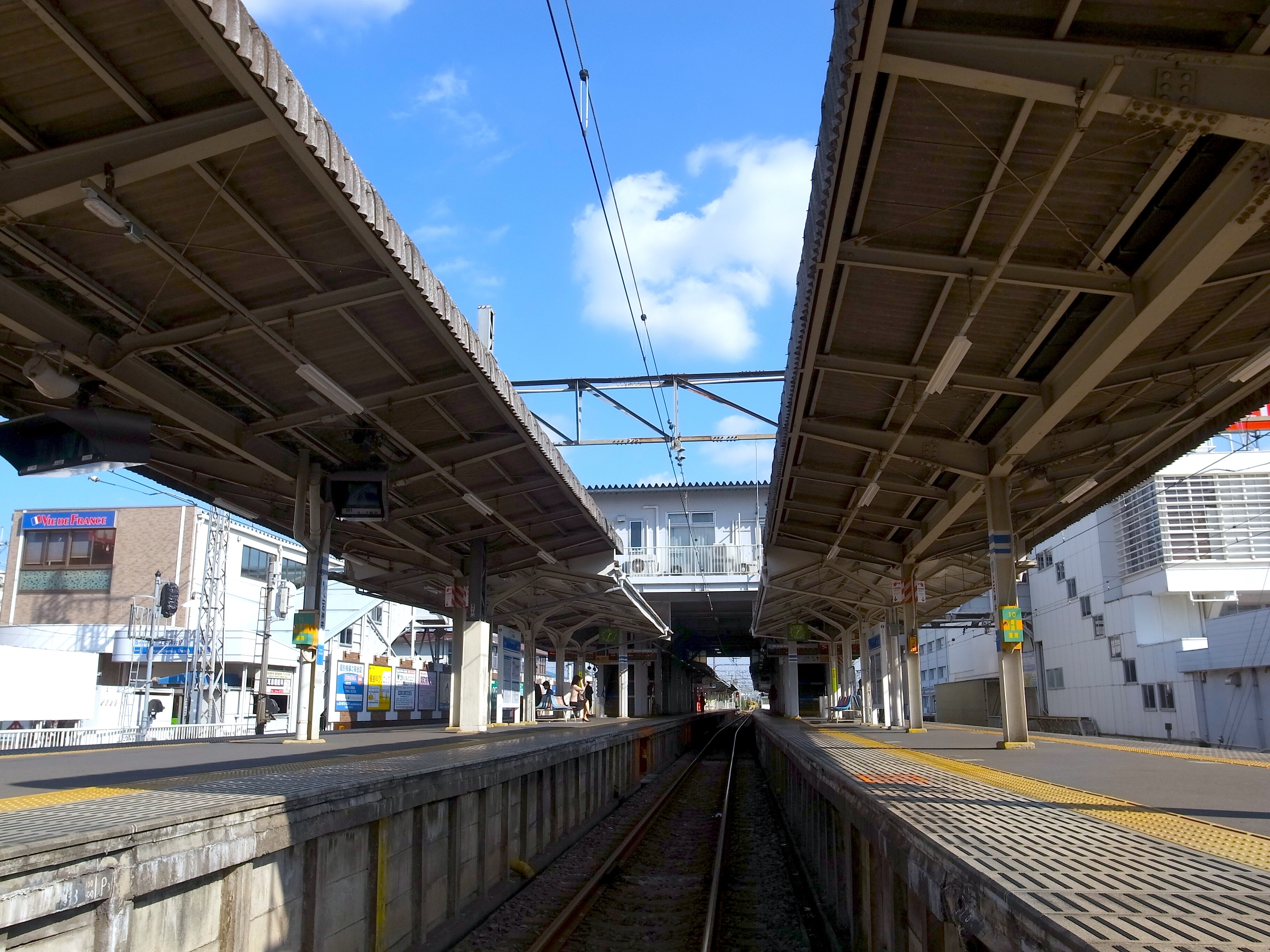
Station platforms, October 2014

The station has two island platforms serving three tracks.

=== Platforms ===
1/2	Seibu Shinjuku Line	for Tanashi, Tokorozawa, Haijima, and Hon-Kawagoe
3/4	Seibu Shinjuku Line	for Saginomiya, Takadanobaba, and Seibu-Shinjuku

Platforms 2 and 3 share the same track. Daytime inbound services generally use Platform 3.

== History ==
Kami-Shakujii Station opened on 16 April 1927. Station numbering was introduced on all Seibu Railway lines during fiscal 2012, with Kami-Shakujii Station becoming "SS13".

== Passenger statistics ==
In fiscal 2013, the station was the 21st busiest on the Seibu network, with an average of 43,643 passengers daily. The passenger figures for previous years are shown below.

Fiscal year	Daily average
2009	44,329
2010	43,382
2011	42,287
2012	43,091
2013	43,643
