= Saginomiya Station (Tokyo) =

Railway station in Tokyo, Japan

Coordinates: 35.7225°N 139.6389°E

SS09 Saginomiya Station 鷺ノ宮駅
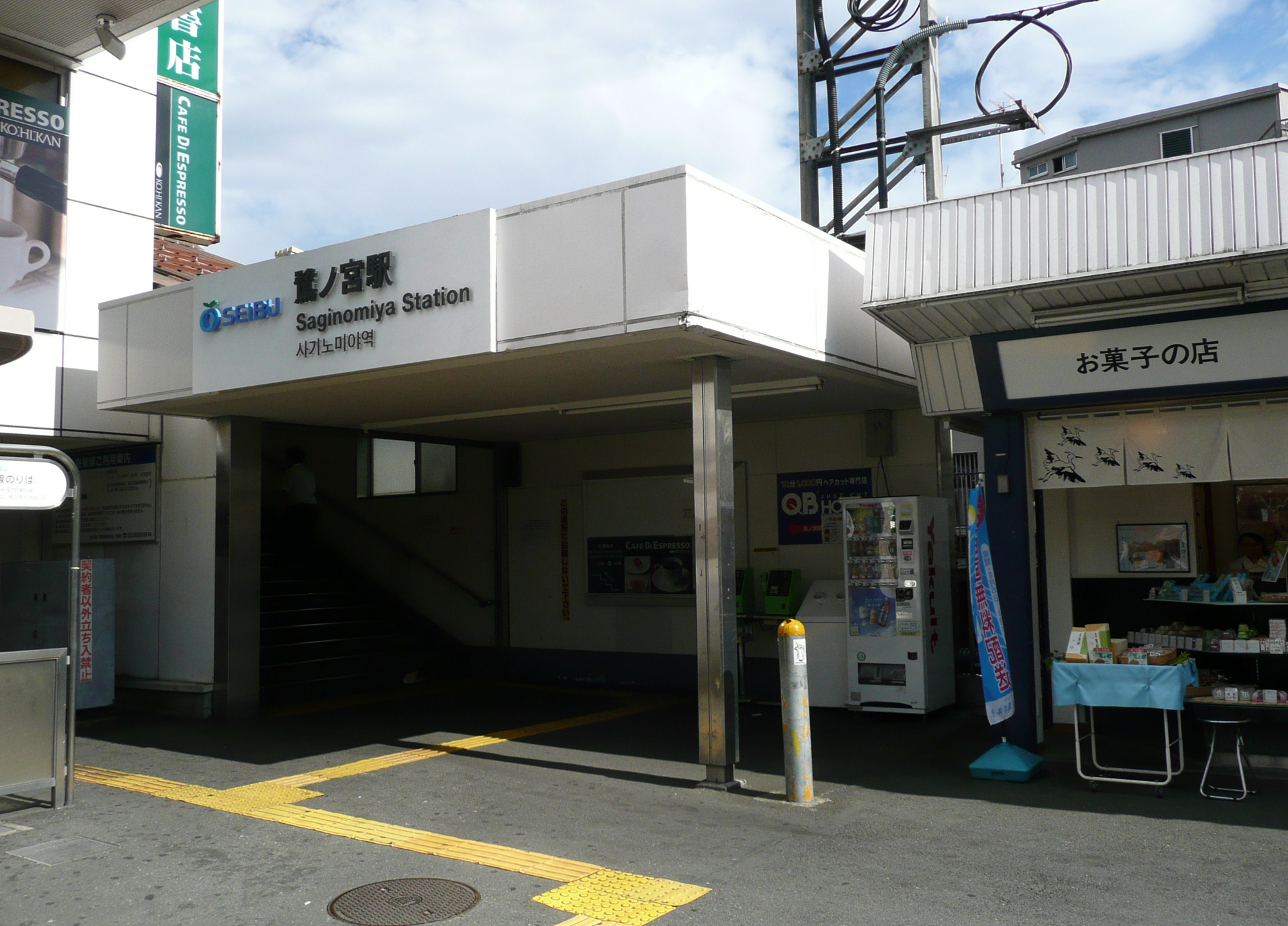
- North entrance, 2012

General information
- Location: Nakano, Tokyo, Tokyo; Japan
- Operator: Seibu Railway
- Line: Seibu Shinjuku Line

Other information
- Station code: SS09

History
- Opened: 16 April 1927

Passengers
- FY2016: 31,671 daily

Services
| Preceding station | Seibu Railway | Following station |
|---|---|---|
| Kami-Shakujii One-way operation | Shinjuku Line Commuter Express | Takadanobaba SS02 towards Seibu-Shinjuku |
| Kami-Shakujii SS13 towards Hon-Kawagoe | Shinjuku Line Express Semi Express | Takadanobaba SS02 towards Seibu-Shinjuku |
| Shimo-Igusa SS10 towards Hon-Kawagoe | Shinjuku Line Local | Toritsu-Kasei SS08 towards Seibu-Shinjuku |
Location

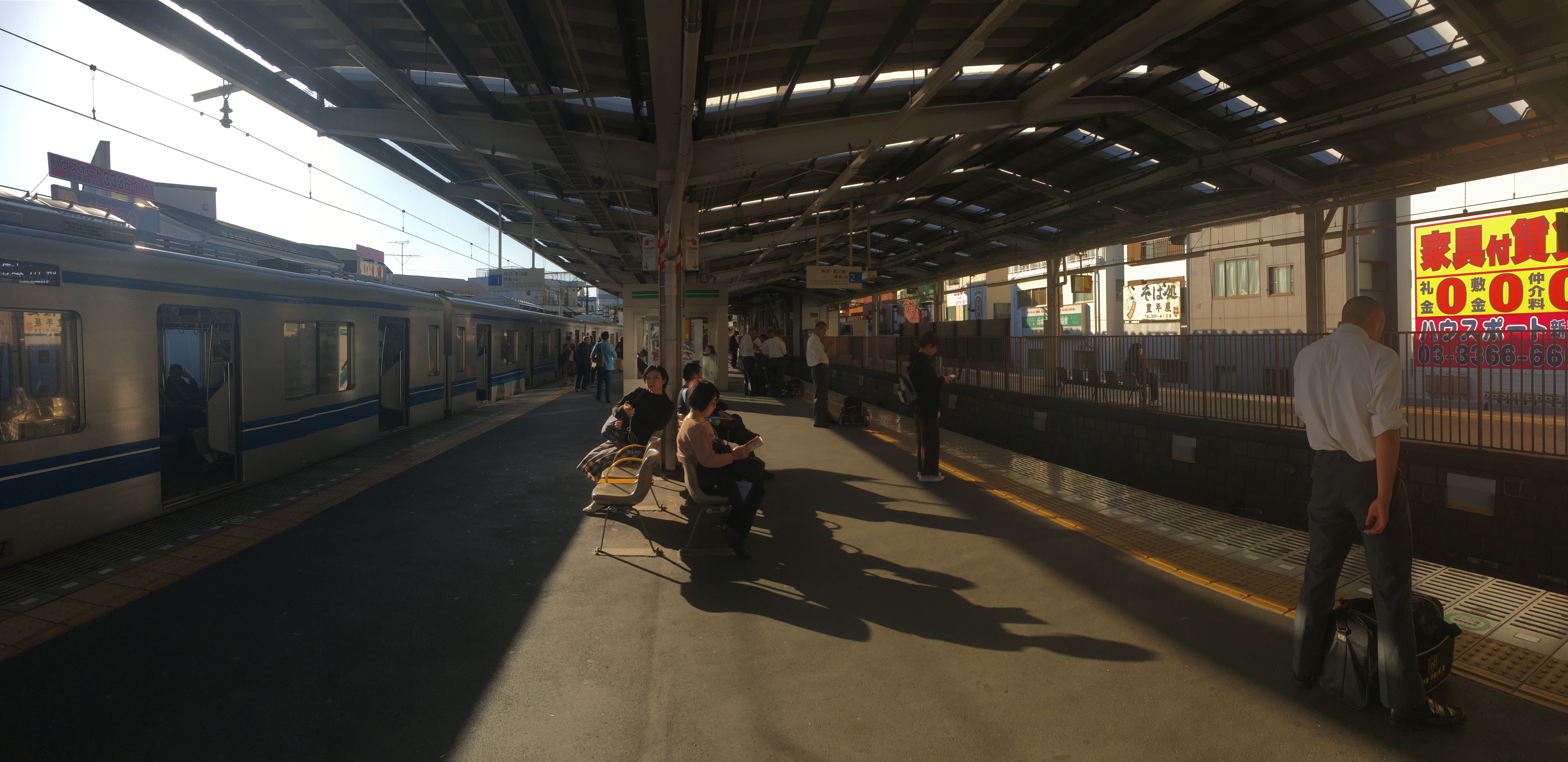
Platforms, 2019

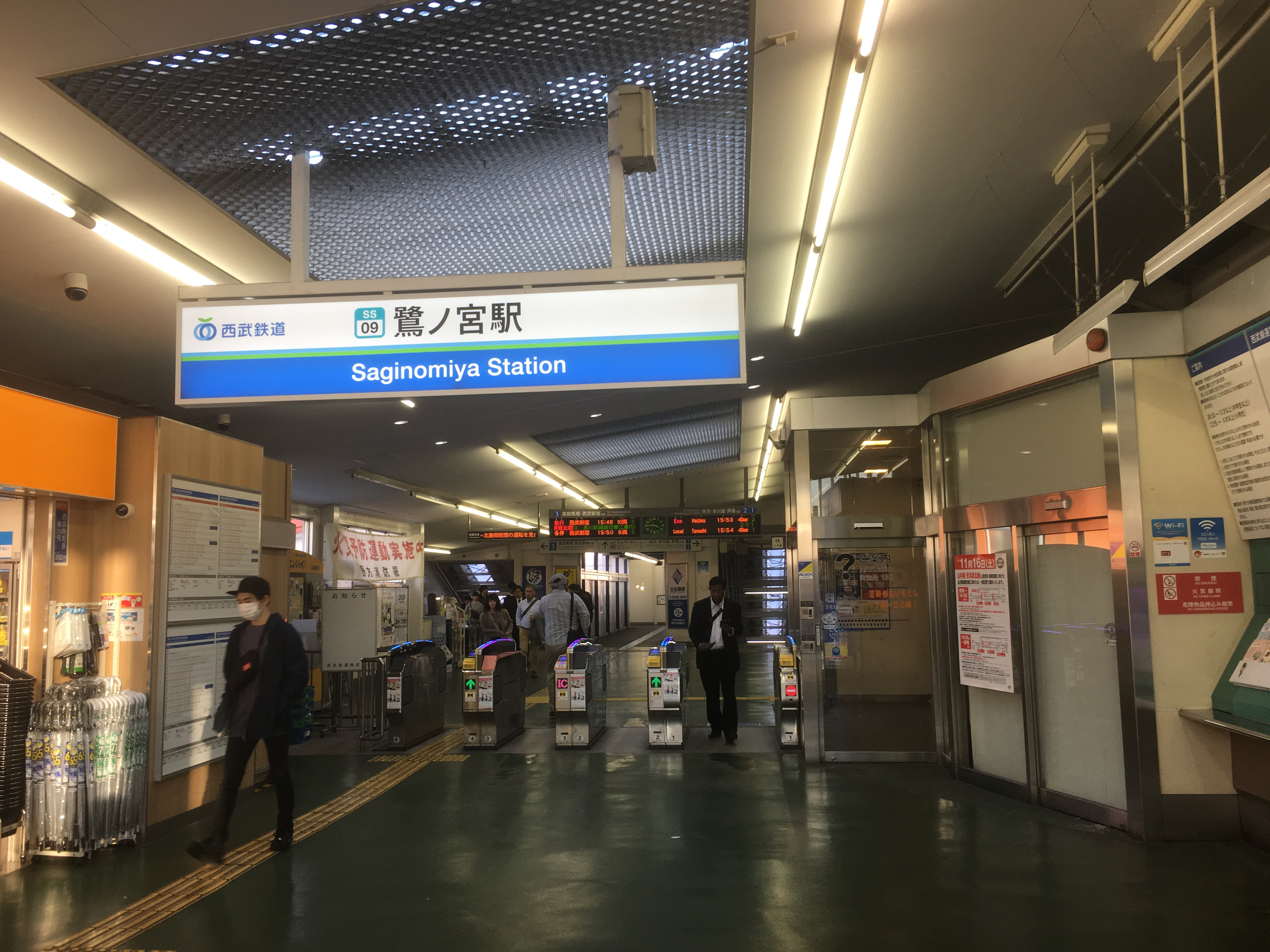
Station ticket gates, 2019

Saginomiya Station (鷺ノ宮駅, Saginomiya-eki) is a railway station in Nakano, Tokyo, Japan. It is served by trains running on the private Seibu Railway's Seibu Shinjuku Line between Seibu-Shinjuku (8.5 km away) in Tokyo and Hon-Kawagoe (39 km away) in Saitama Prefecture.

== History ==
Saginomiya Station opened on 16 April 1927. Station numbering was introduced on all Seibu Railway lines during fiscal 2012, with Saginomiya Station becoming "SS09".

== Station layout ==
The station has one island platform and one side platform serving three tracks.

=== Platforms ===
| 1/2 | Seibu Shinjuku Line | for Tanashi, Tokorozawa, Haijima, and Hon-Kawagoe |
| 3 | Seibu Shinjuku Line | for Takadanobaba and Seibu-Shinjuku |

== Passenger statistics ==
In fiscal 2016, the station was the 31st busiest on the Seibu network with an average of 31,671 passengers daily.

The passenger figures for previous years are as shown below.

| Fiscal year | Daily average |
|---|---|
| 2009 | 30,681 |
| 2010 | 29,839 |
| 2011 | 29,260 |
| 2012 | 29,677 |
| 2013 | 29,911 |
| 2014 | 29,927 |
| 2015 | 30,915 |
