= Nakai Station =

Railway and metro station in Tokyo, Japan

SS04 Nakai Station 中井駅

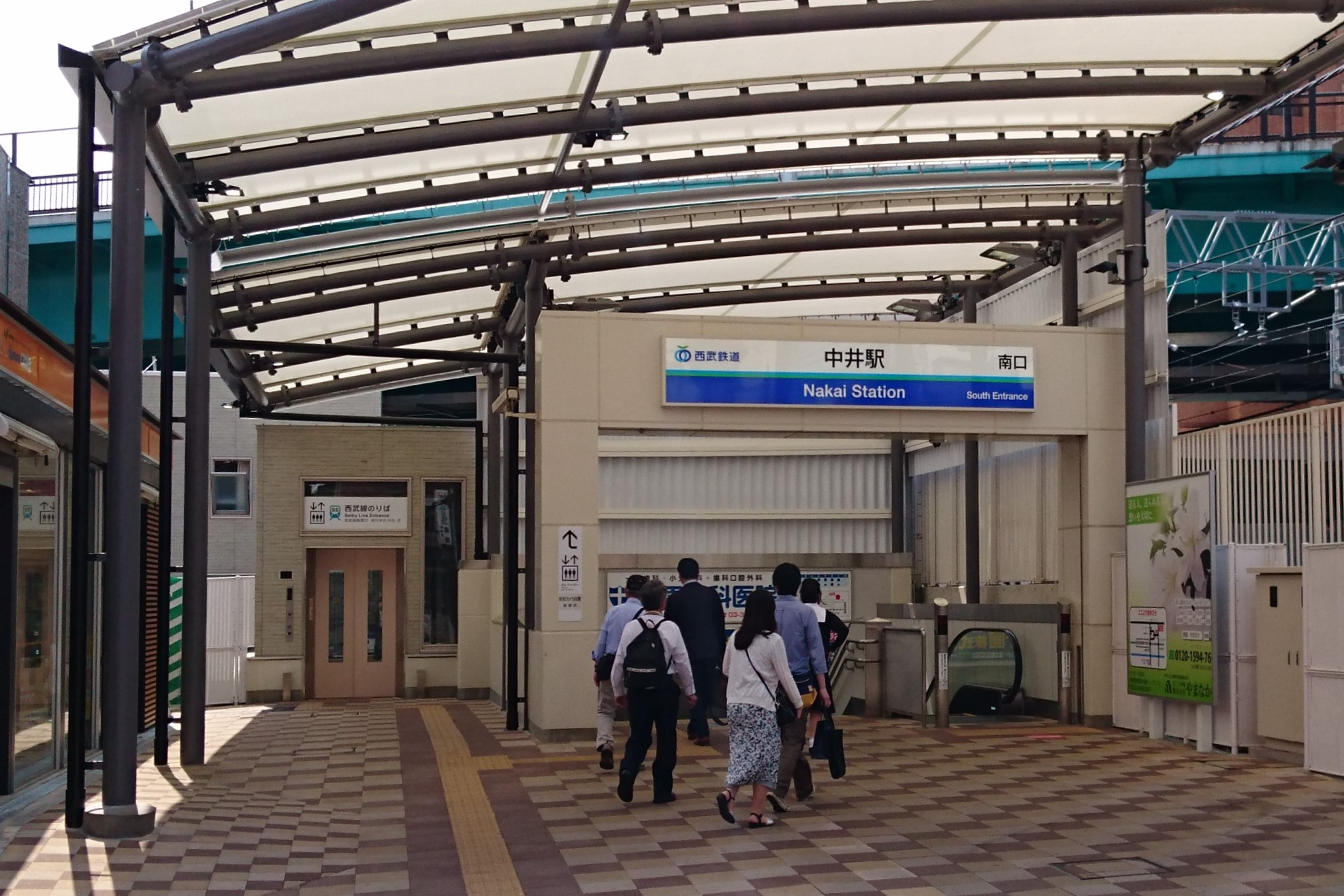
- The Seibu station south entrance in May 2017

General information
- Location: 2-19-1 Nakai (Seibu); 2-20-8 Kamiochiai (Toei Subway); Shinjuku City, Tokyo; Japan
- Coordinates: 35.7146°N 139.6867°E
- Operator: Seibu Railway; Toei Subway
- Lines: Seibu Shinjuku Line; Ōedo Line
- Platforms: 2 side platforms (Seibu), 1 island platform (Toei)
- Tracks: 5 (3 Seibu (1 bypass), 2 Toei)
- Connections: Bus stop

Construction
- Structure type: At grade (Seibu), Underground (Toei)

Other information
- Station code: SS04 (Seibu); E-32 (Toei)

History
- Opened: Seibu:16 April 1927; 99 years ago Toei:19 December 1997; 28 years ago

Passengers
- 28,264 (Seibu, FY2013), 11,086 (Toei, FY2012 [boarding only]) daily

Services
Preceding station	Seibu Railway	Following station
Araiyakushi-mae SS05 towards Hon-Kawagoe	Shinjuku Line Local	Shimo-Ochiai SS03 towards Seibu-Shinjuku
Preceding station	Toei Subway	Following station
Ochiai-minami-nagasaki towards Hikarigaoka	Ōedo Line	Higashi-nakano towards Tochōmae
Location

Nakai Station (中井駅, Nakai-eki) is the name of two railway stations in Shinjuku, Tokyo, Japan, served by the Seibu Shinjuku Line (station number SS04) and the Toei Ōedo Line (station number E-32) respectively. The two stations are separated by approximately two minutes' walk through a shopping street.

== Lines ==
Nakai Station is served by the following two lines.

- Seibu Shinjuku Line
- Toei Ōedo Line

== Station layout ==
=== Seibu ===
The Seibu station has two side platforms serving two tracks. The station has a third central track used for passing express trains in both directions.

1	Seibu Shinjuku Line	for Tanashi, Tokorozawa, Haijima, and Hon-Kawagoe
2	Seibu Shinjuku Line	for Takadanobaba and Seibu-Shinjuku

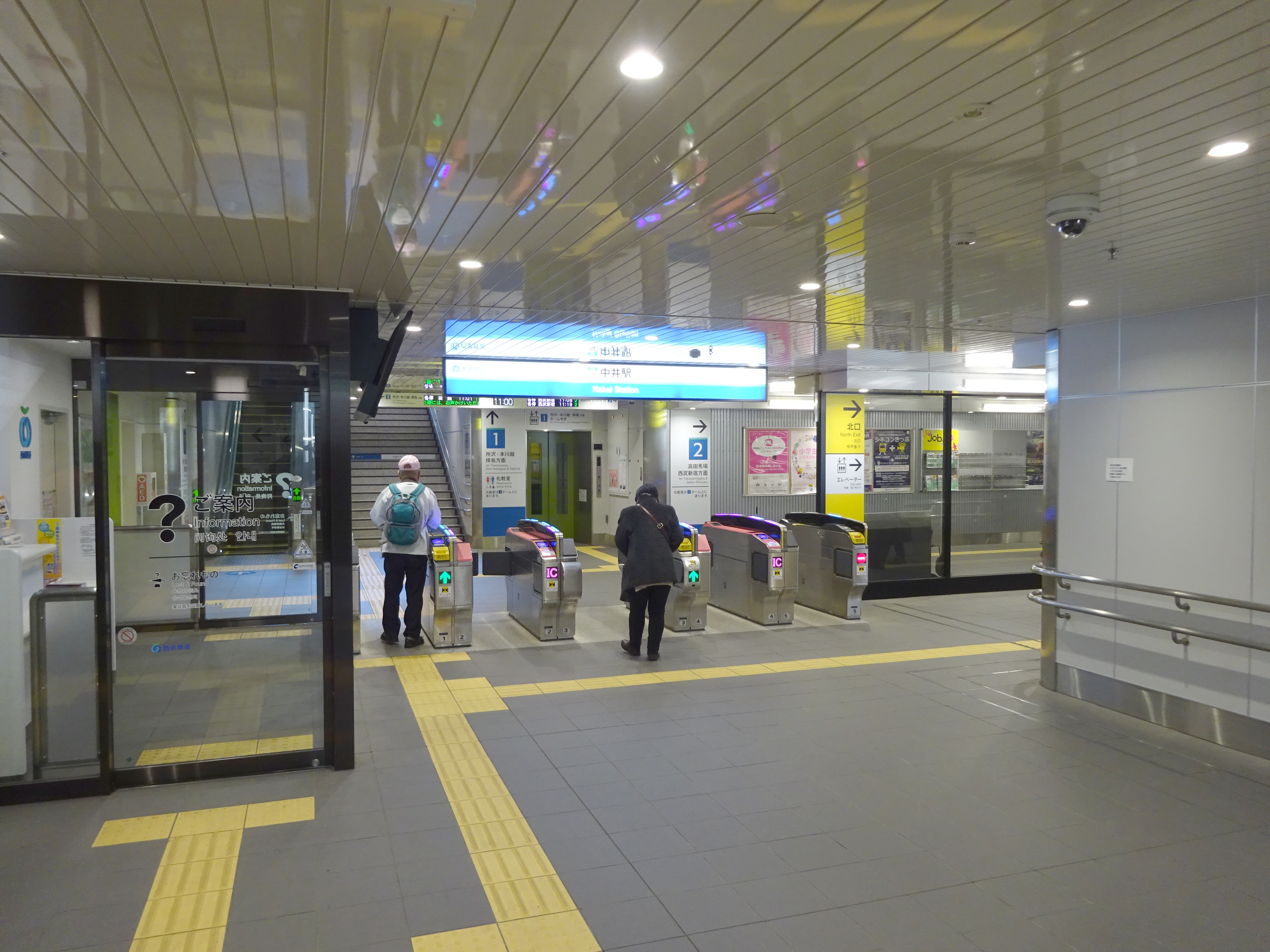
Seibu ticket gates

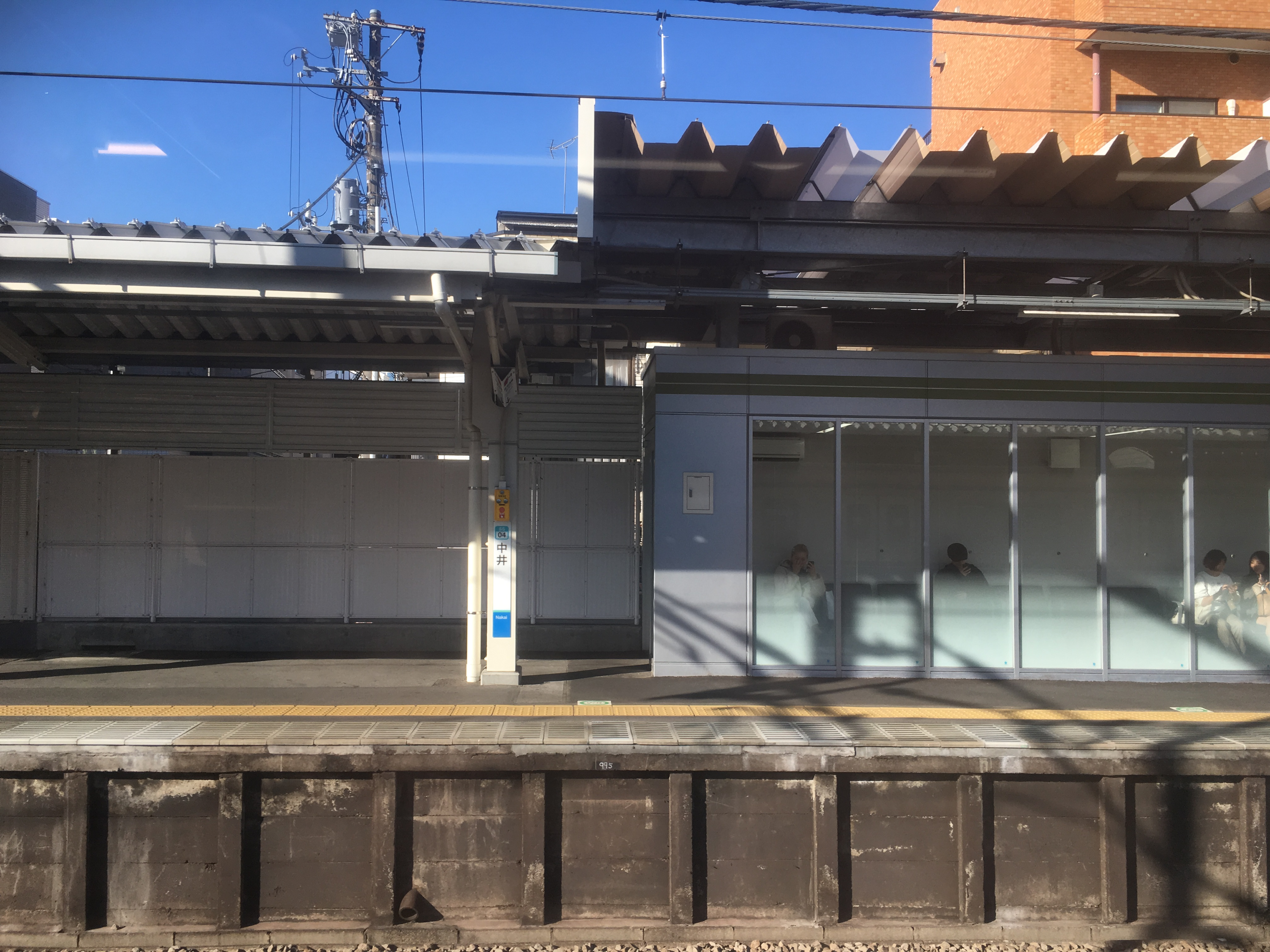
Seibu line platform, 2019

=== Toei ===
The Toei station has an island platform with two tracks, located underground at a depth of 35 m, parallel to and below both Yamate-dori and the Central Circular Route.

1	Ōedo Line	for Tochōmae, Roppongi, and Daimon
2	Ōedo Line	for Nerima and Hikarigaoka

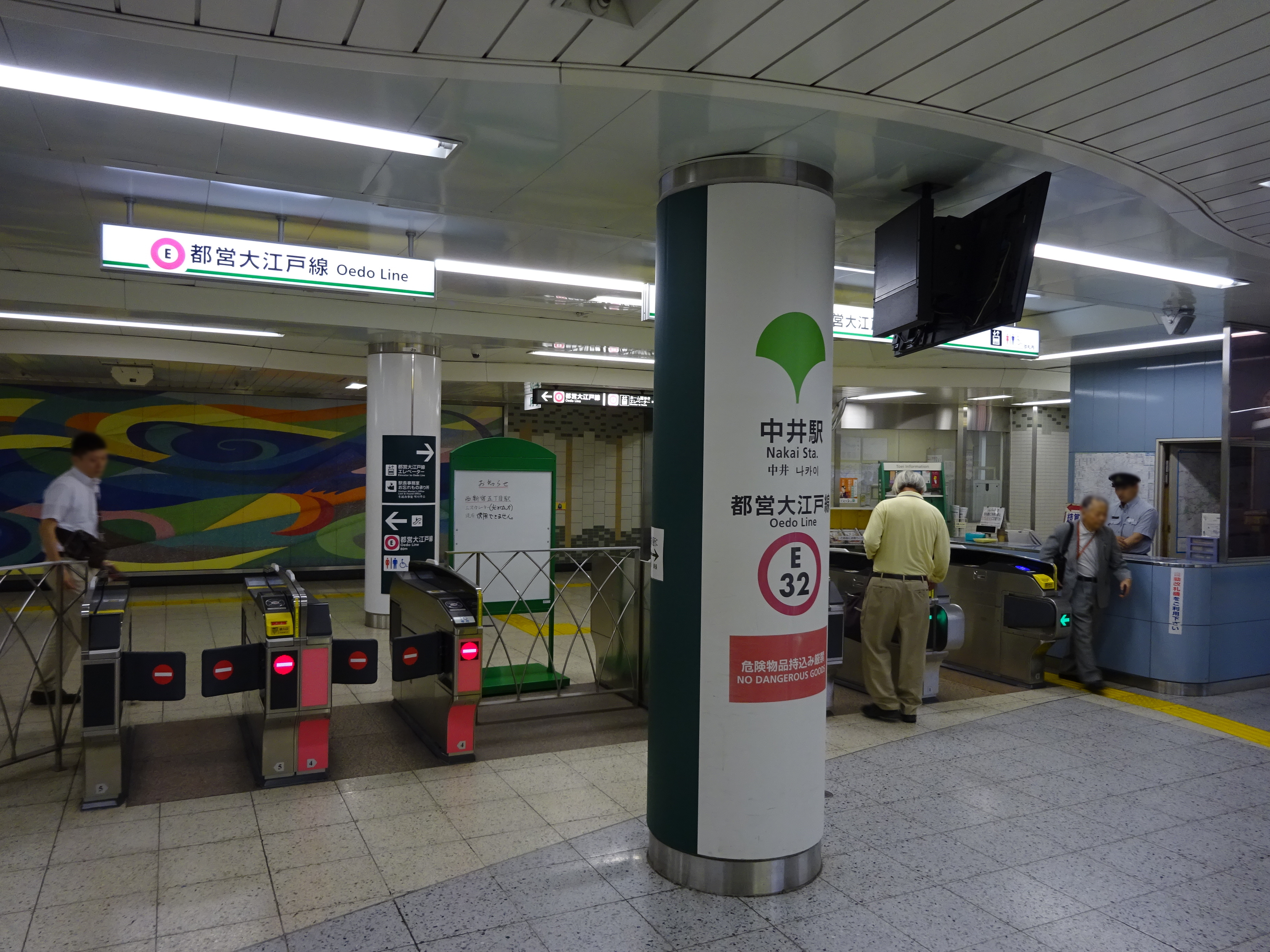
Toei ticket gates

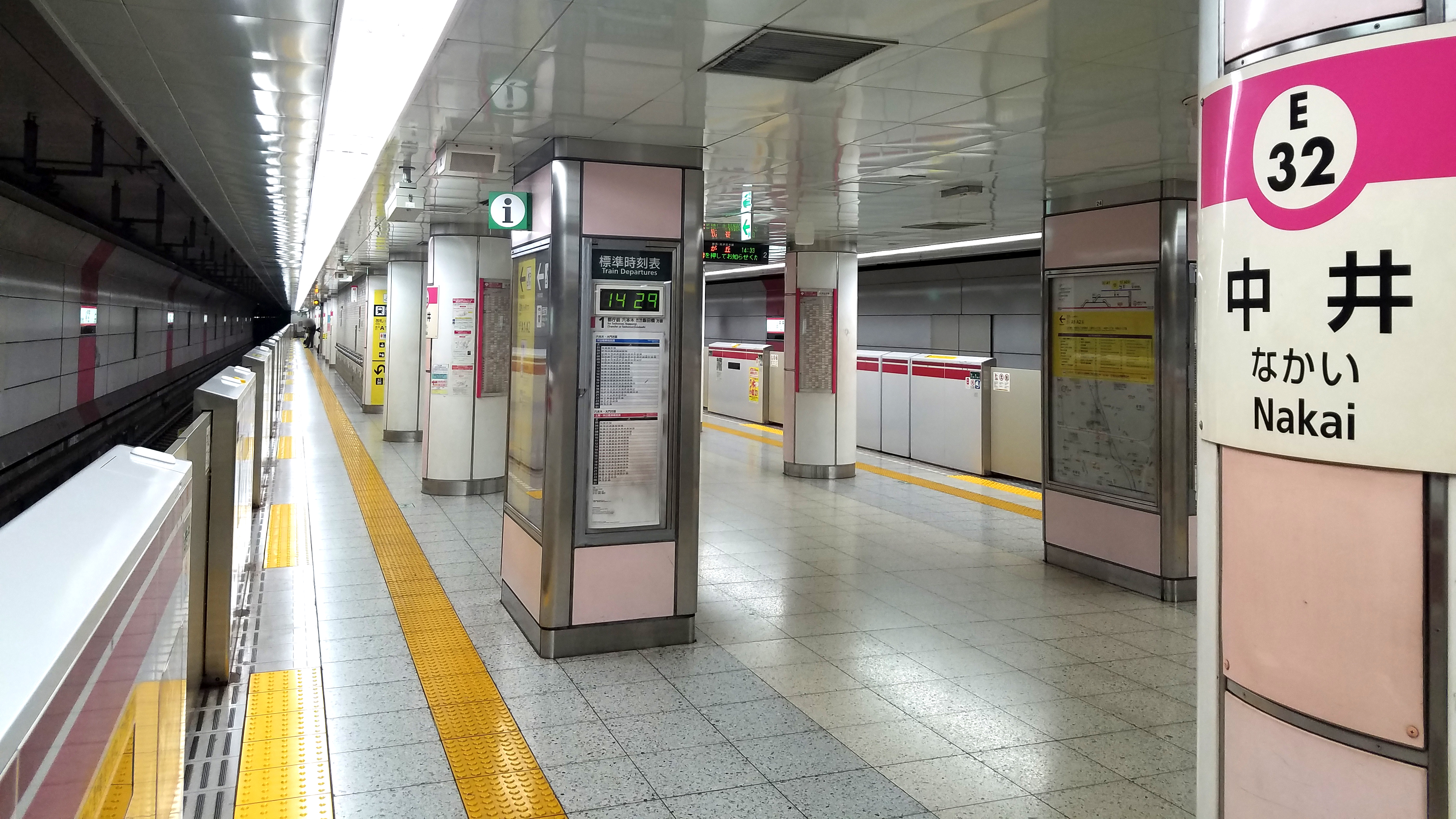
Toei Oedo Line platforms, 2019

== History ==
The Seibu station opened on 16 April 1927. The Toei station opened in 1997.

Station numbering was introduced on all Seibu Railway lines during fiscal 2012, with Nakai Station becoming "SS04". The station number for the Ōedo Line is E-32.

The Seibu station was re-configured in 2016 to place the Seibu ticket gates underground, creating north and south exits from the station.

== Passenger statistics ==
In fiscal 2013, the station was the 35th busiest on the Seibu network with an average of 28,264 passengers daily. In fiscal 2012, an average of 11,086 people used the Toei station to board a train per day.

The passenger figures for the Seibu station in previous years are as shown below.

Fiscal year	Daily average
2009	28,807
2010	28,532
2011	27,662
2012	28,011
2013	28,264

== See also ==
- List of railway stations in Japan
