= Nogata Station =

Railway station in Tokyo, Japan

Coordinates: 35.7197°N 139.6528°E

SS07 Nogata Station 野方駅
- South entrance, March 2024

General information
- Location: Nakano, Tokyo, Tokyo; Japan
- Operator: Seibu Railway
- Line: Seibu Shinjuku Line
- Connections: Bus stop

Other information
- Station code: SS07

History
- Opened: 16 April 1927

Passengers
- FY2013: 22,941 daily

Services
Preceding station	Seibu Railway	Following station
Toritsu-Kasei SS08 towards Hon-Kawagoe	Shinjuku Line Local	Numabukuro SS06 towards Seibu-Shinjuku
Location

Nogata Station (野方駅, Nogata-eki) is a railway station on the Seibu Shinjuku Line in Nakano, Tokyo, Japan, operated by the private railway operator Seibu Railway.

== Lines ==
Nogata Station is served by the 47.5 km Seibu Shinjuku Line from Seibu-Shinjuku in Tokyo to Hon-Kawagoe in Saitama Prefecture.

== Station layout ==
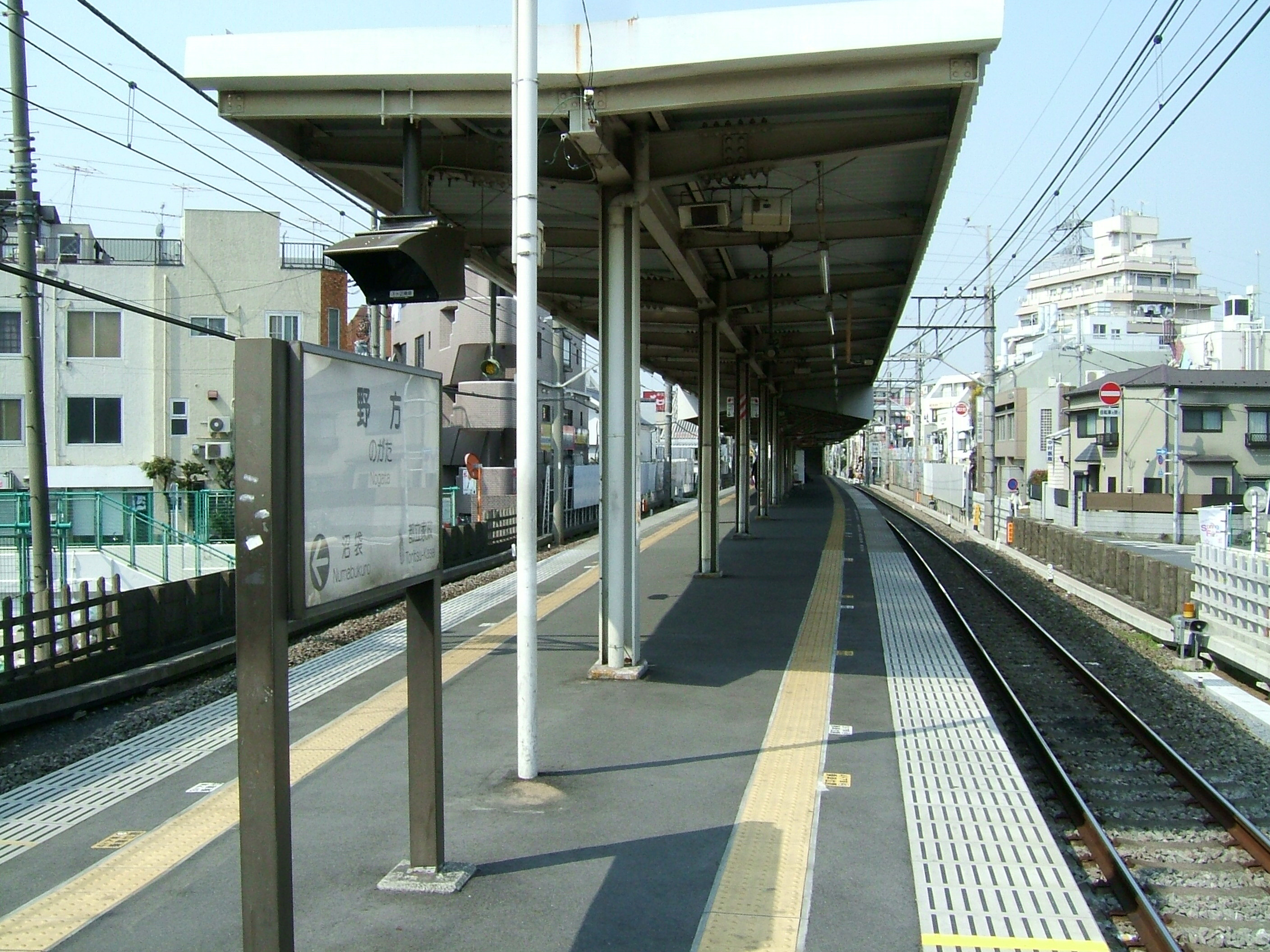
Platform, March 2008

The station consists of one ground-level island platform serving two tracks.

=== Platforms ===
1	Seibu Shinjuku Line	for Tanashi, Tokorozawa, Haijima, and Hon-Kawagoe
2	Seibu Shinjuku Line	for Takadanobaba and Seibu-Shinjuku

== History ==
Nogata Station opened on 16 April 1927. Station numbering was introduced on all Seibu Railway lines during fiscal 2012, with Nogata Station becoming "SS07".

== Passenger statistics ==
In fiscal 2013, the station was the 47th busiest on the Seibu network with an average of 22,941 passengers daily.

The passenger figures for previous years are as shown below.

Fiscal year	Daily average
2009	22,154
2010	21,900
2011	21,844
2012	22,549
2013	22,941
